= Indiana High School Athletics Conferences: Mid-Eastern – Northwestern =

This is the second of three pages that lists all of the High School athletic conferences located in state of Indiana under the Indiana High School Athletic Association (IHSAA).

== Indiana's class system ==
Indiana's classes are determined by student enrollment, broken into classes of roughly equal size depending on sport. The 2011–12 school year marks a change in the classification period, as schools are reclassified in all class sports biennially instead of quadrennially.

It is also important to note that some schools (mostly private) are placed in classes higher than their enrollment. This is due to a new IHSAA rule that took effect for the 2012–13 year that dictates that school that wins two state championships in a row is automatically moved up into the next class.

Classes for 2020–21 through 2022–23: Most sports:

- Class A: <325 Students.
- Class AA: 325-565 Students.
- Class AAA: 566-1089 Students.
- Class AAAA: >1089 Students.

Football:

- Class A: <418 students
- Class AA: 418-591 students
- Class AAA: 592-849 students
- Class AAAA: 850-1499 students
- Class AAAAA: 1500-2099 Students
- Class AAAAAA: >2100 Students

Soccer:

- Class A: <499 students
- Class AA: 500-1000 students
- Class AAA: >1000 Students

== Explanation of colors ==
Schools that do not play football.
Schools that are affiliate members for certain sports.
Private or parochial schools.
Military Academies.
Public Magnet Schools.
Public schools that draw from multiple counties.
Public schools that draw from multiple time zones
Out of state schools. (e.g. Mount Carmel)
Conferences without State Locator Maps are entirely in one county. County Name and City(s) are listed above chart.

=== Mid-Eastern Conference ===
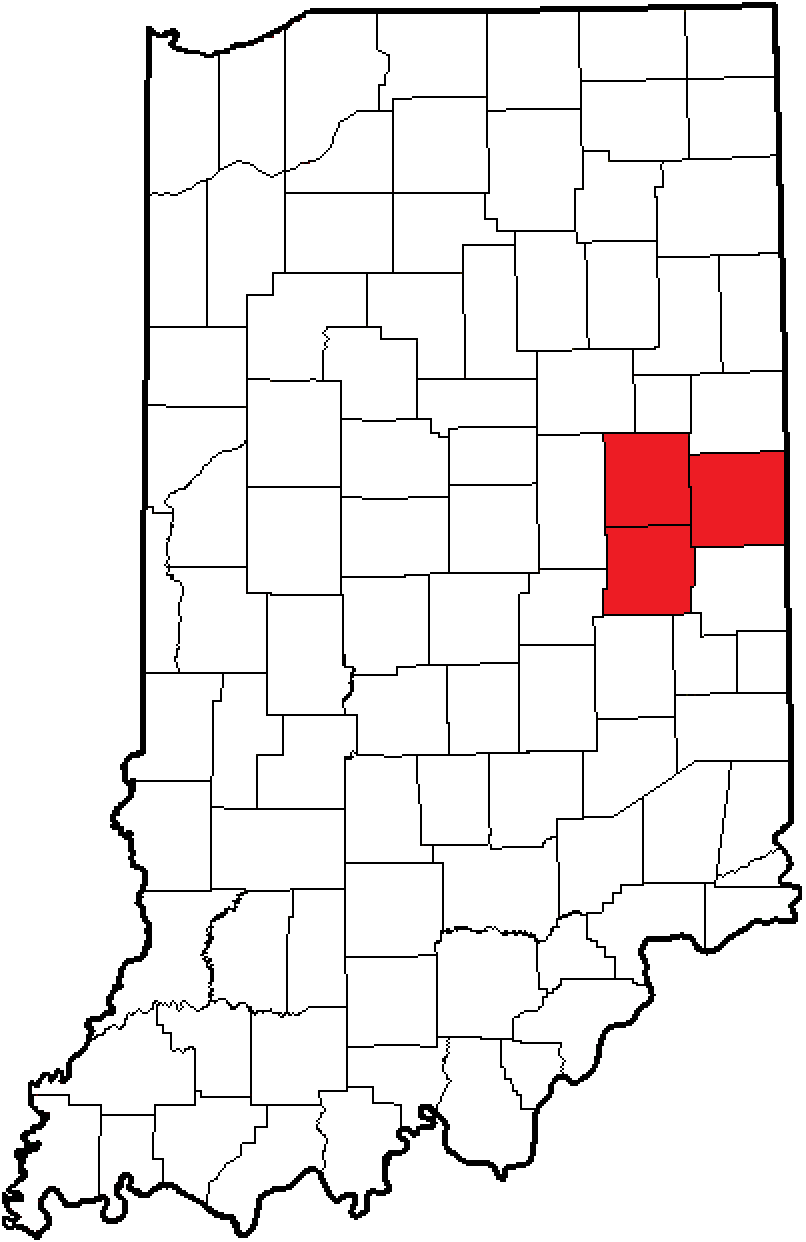
The Mid-Eastern Conference in Indiana

School	Location	Mascot	Colors	Enrollment	IHSAA Class	IHSAA Football Class	# / County
Blue River; Valley	Mt. Summit	Vikings		229	A	--	33; Henry
Muncie; Cowan	Muncie	Blackhawks		227	A	--	18; Delaware
Daleville	Daleville	Broncos		268	A	--	18; Delaware
Eastern Hancock	Charlottesville	Royals		425	AA	AA	30 Hancock
Monroe; Central	Parker City	Golden Bears		316	A	A	68; Randolph
Randolph; Southern	Lynn	Rebels		189	A	--	68; Randolph
Shenandoah	Middletown	Raiders		442	AA	A	33 Henry
Union; Modoc	Modoc	Rockets		148	A	--	68 Randolph; 33 Henry
Wapahani	Selma	Raiders		361	AA	--	18; Delaware
Wes-Del	Gaston	Warriors		266	A	A	18; Delaware

=== Mid-Hoosier Conference ===
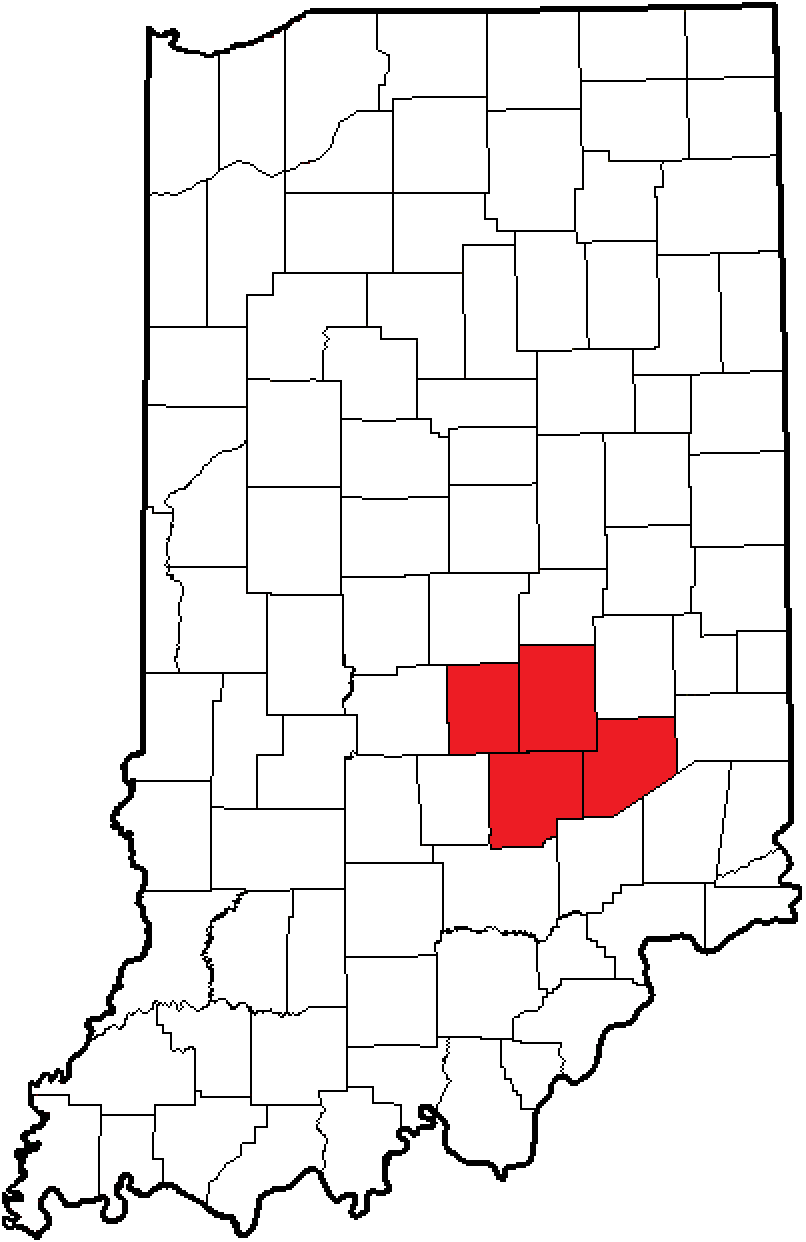
The Mid-Hoosier Conference within Indiana

School	Location	Mascot	Colors	Enrollment	IHSAA Class	IHSAA Football Class	County
Edinburgh; Community	Edinburgh	Lancers		269	A	A	41; Johnson
Hauser	Hope	Jets		297	A	--	03; Bartholomew
Morristown	Morristown	Yellow Jackets		231	A	--	73; Shelby
North; Decatur	Greensburg	Chargers		369	AA	A	16; Decatur
South; Decatur	Greensburg	Cougars		292	A	A	16; Decatur
Southwestern; Shelbyville	Shelbyville	Spartans		218	A	--	73; Shelby
Waldron	Waldron	Mohawks		237	A	--	73; Shelby

Schools in green play football in the Mid-Indiana Football Conference, except for independent Edinburgh

=== Mid-Indiana Football Conference ===
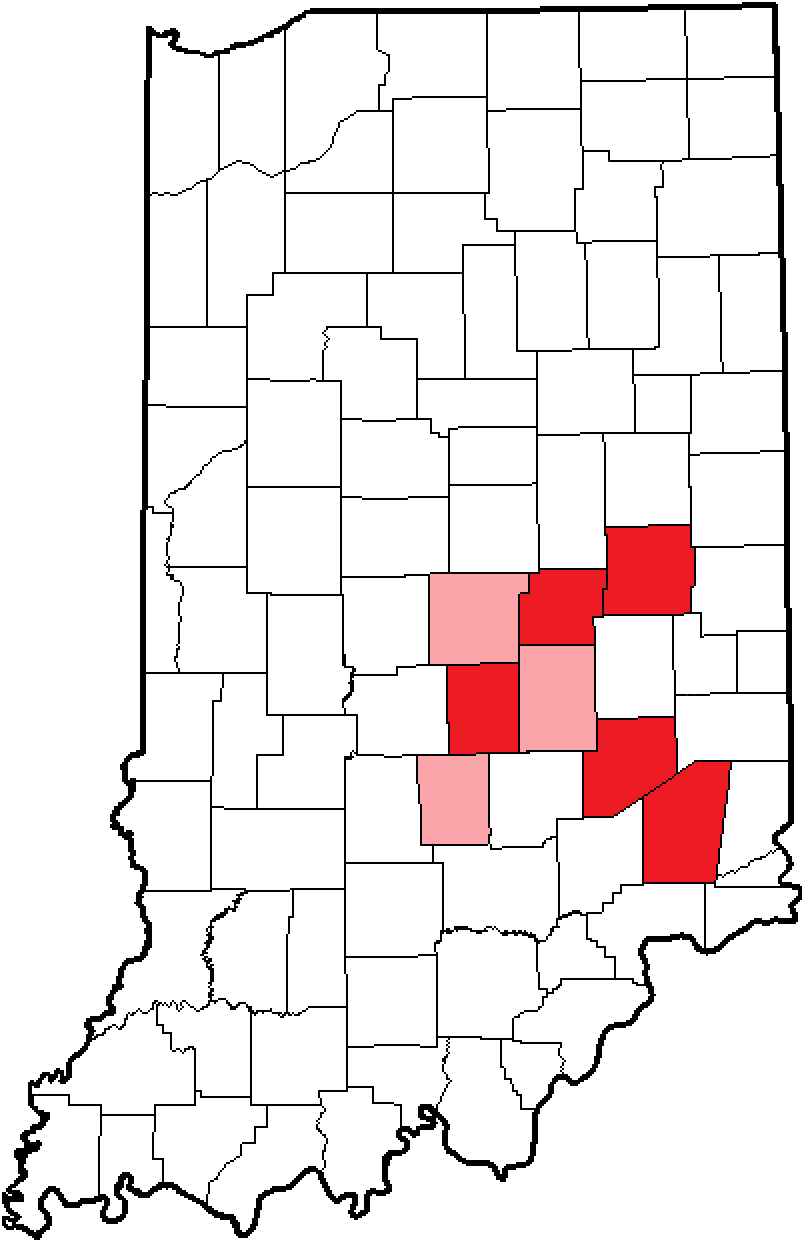
The Mid-Indiana Football Conference within Indiana

School	Location	Mascot	Colors	Enrollment	IHSAA Football Class	Primary Conference	County
Edinburgh	Edinburgh	Lancers		269	A	Mid-Hoosier	30 Johnson
Milan	Milan	Indians		408	AA	Ohio River; Valley	69; Ripley
North; Decatur	Greensburg	Chargers		369	A	Mid-Hoosier	16 Decatur
Oldenburg Academy	Oldenburg	Twisters		210	A	Independent	24 Franklin
South; Decatur	Greensburg	Cougars		292	A	Mid-Hoosier	16; Decatur
Switzerland County	Vevay	Pacers		404	A	Ohio River Valley	78 Switzerland

=== Mid-Southern Conference ===
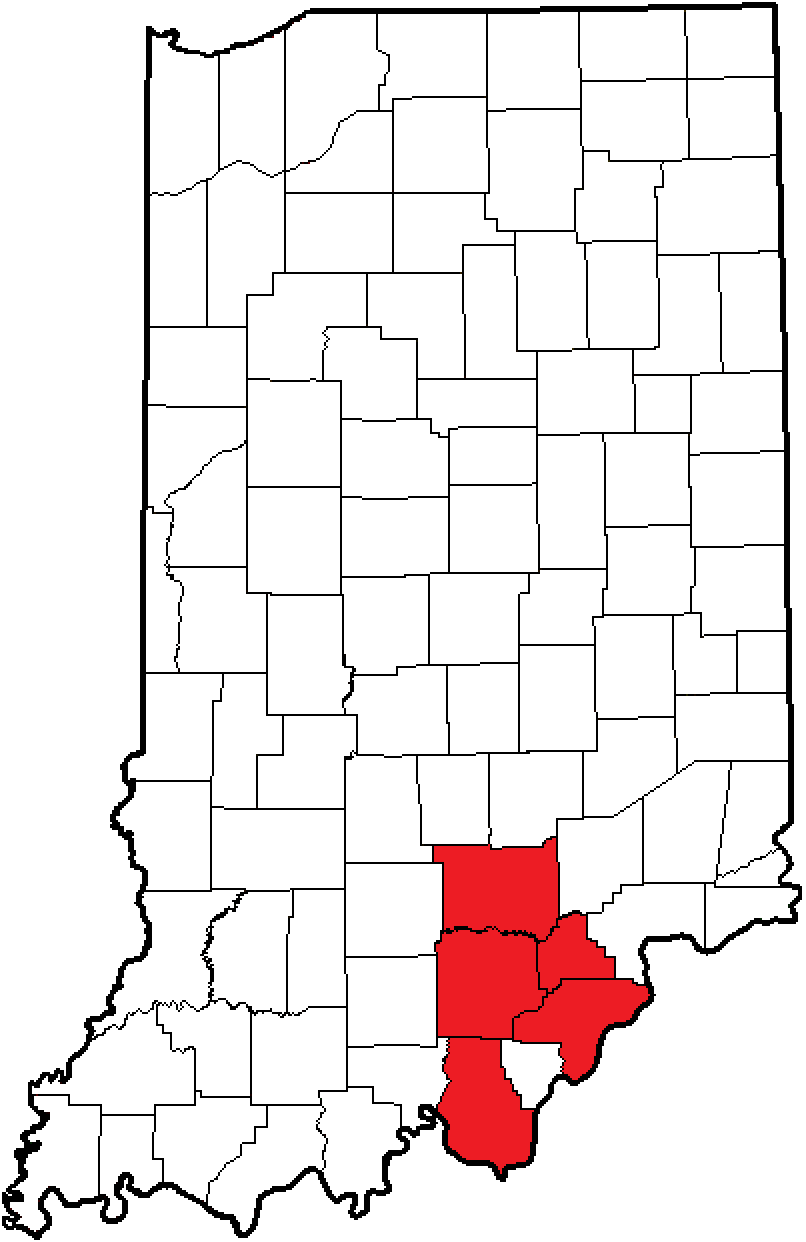
The Mid-Southern Conference in Indiana

School	Location	Mascot	Colors	Enrollment	IHSAA Class	IHSAA Football Class	# / County
Austin	Austin	Eagles		368	AA	--	72; Scott
Brownstown; Central	Brownstown	Braves		596	AAA	AAA	36; Jackson
Charlestown	Charlestown	Pirates		729	AAA	AAA	10; Clark
Clarksville	Clarksville	Generals		473	AA	AA	10; Clark
Corydon; Central	Corydon	Panthers		774	AAA	AAA	31; Harrison
Eastern; Pekin	New Pekin	Musketeers		522	AA	AA	88; Washington
North; Harrison	Ramsey	Cougars		685	AAA	AAA	31; Harrison
Salem	Salem	Lions		627	AAA	AAA	88; Washington
Scottsburg	Scottsburg	Warriors		877	AAA	--	72; Scott
Silver; Creek	Sellersburg	Dragons		716	AAA	AAA	10; Clark

=== Mid-State Conference ===
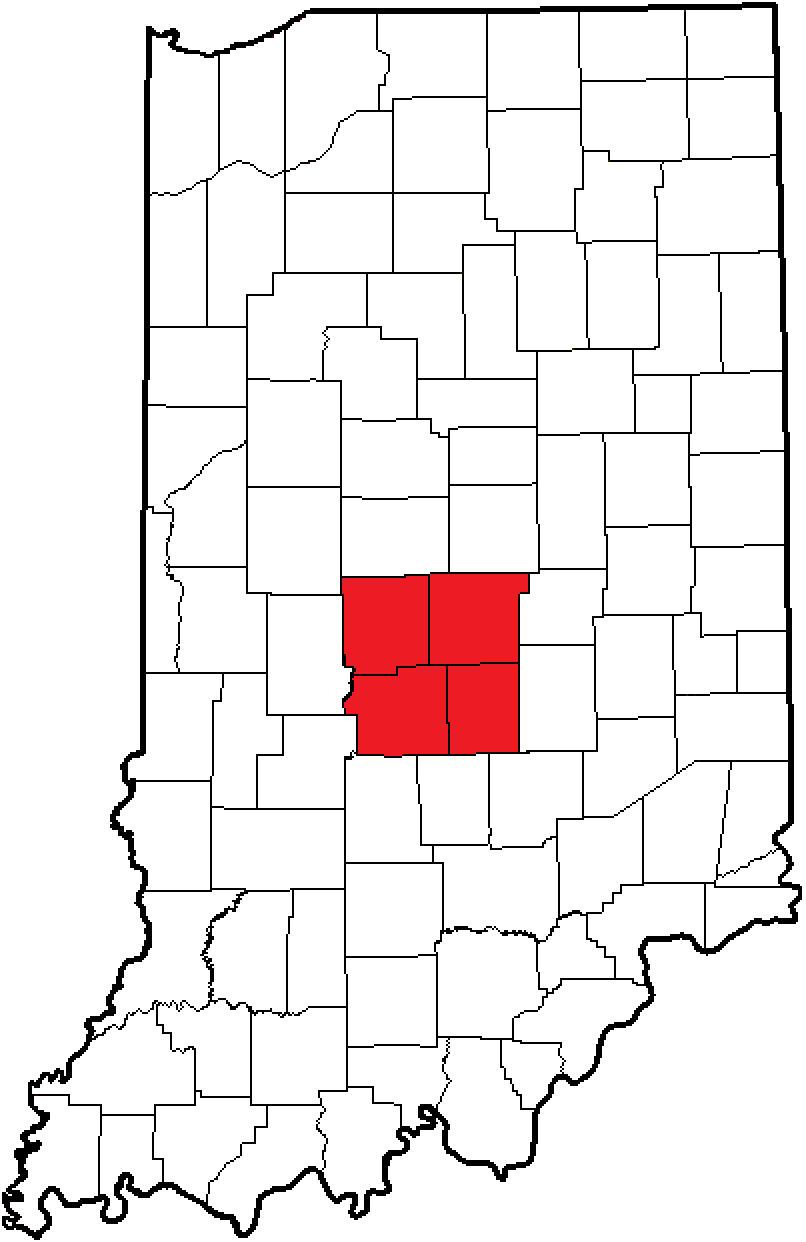
The Mid-State Conference within Indiana

School	Mascot	Colors	Location	Enrollment	IHSAA Class	IHSAA Football Class	County
Indianapolis; Decatur Central	Hawks		Indianapolis	1,870	AAAA	AAAAA	49; Marion
Franklin; Community	Grizzly Cubs		Franklin	1,601	AAAA	AAAAA	41; Johnson
Greenwood	Woodmen		Greenwood	1,167	AAAA	AAAA	41; Johnson
Martinsville	Artesians		Martinsville	1,661	AAAA	AAAAA	55; Morgan
Mooresville	Pioneers		Mooresville	1,348	AAAA	AAAA	55; Morgan
Indianapolis Perry Meridian	Falcons		Indianapolis	2,445	AAAA	AAAAAA	49 Marion
Plainfield	Quakers		Plainfield	1,388	AAAA	AAAA	32 Hendricks
Whiteland; Community	Warriors		Whiteland	1,713	AAAA	AAAAA	41; Johnson

=== Midwest Athletic Conference ===
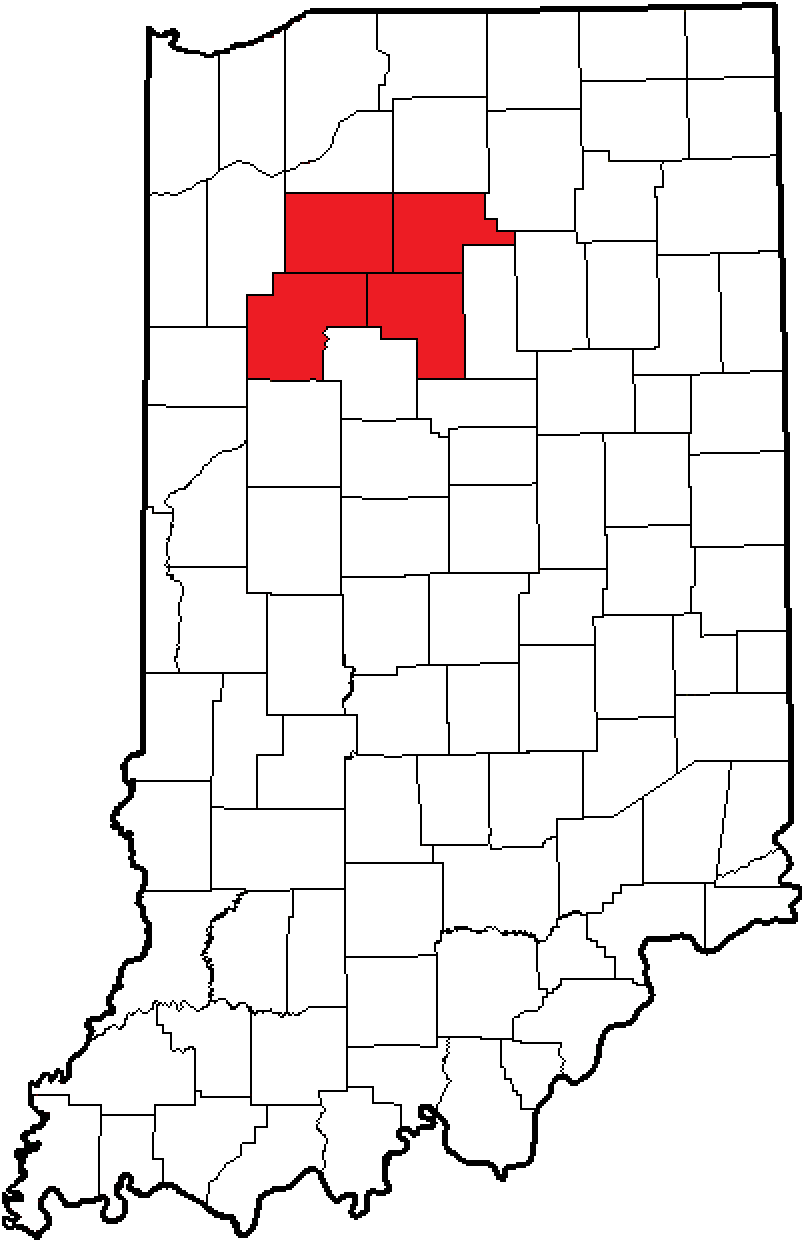
Location of Midwest members in Indiana

School	Location	Mascot	Colors	Enrollment	IHSAA Class	IHSAA Football Class	# / County
Frontier	Chalmers	Falcons		258	A	A	91; White
North Newton	Morocco	Spartans		452	AA	AA	56 Newton
North; White	Monon	Vikings		278	A	A	91; White
South; Newton	Kentland	Rebels		270	A	A	56; Newton
Tri-County	Wolcott	Cavaliers		227	A	A	91; White^{1}
West; Central	Medaryville	Trojans		264	A	A	66; Pulaski

The Midwest Conference is expected to disband in 2015 with most members joining the newly organized Hoosier North Athletic Conference.

=== North Central Athletic Conference ===
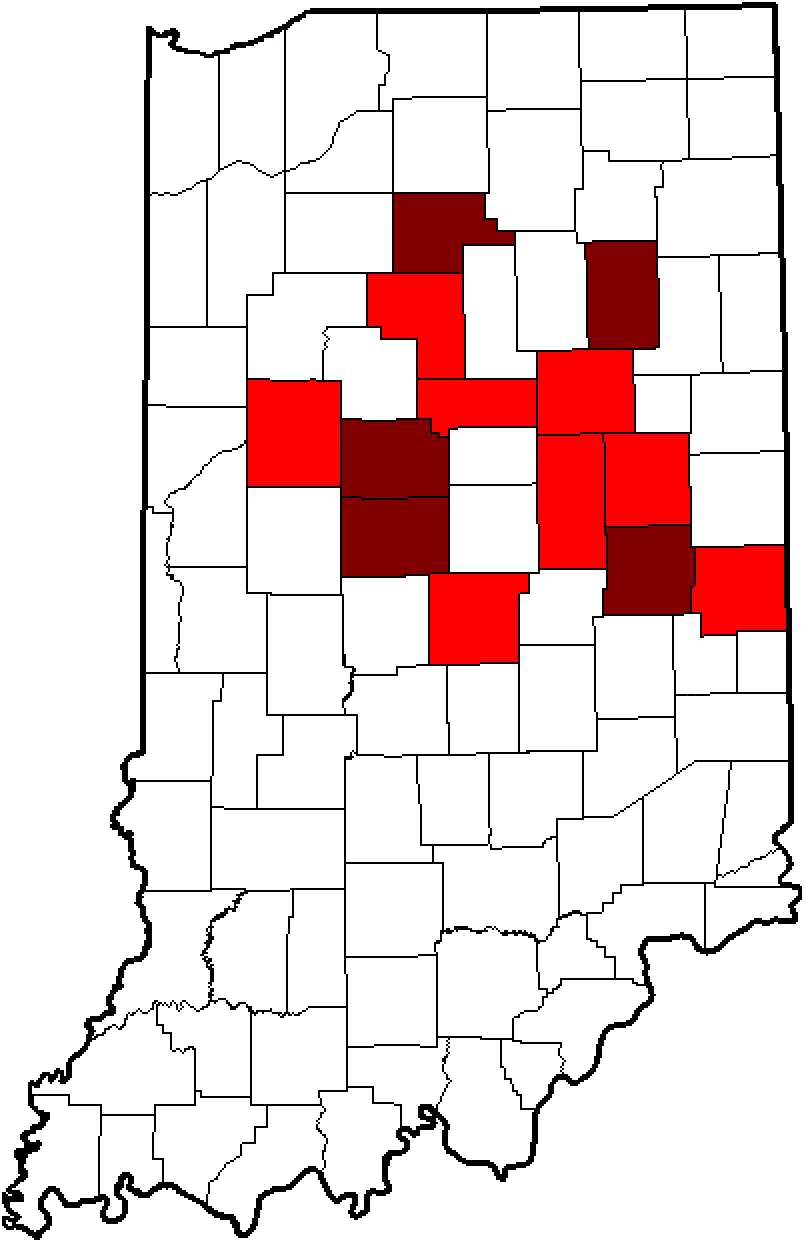
The North Central Athletic Conference in Indiana

School	Location	Mascot	Colors	Enrollment	IHSAA Class	IHSAA Football Class	# / County
Anderson	Anderson	Indians		2,578	AAAA	AAAAA	48; Madison
Kokomo	Kokomo	Wildkats		1,961	AAAA	AAAAA	34; Howard
Logansport	Logansport	Berries		1,316	AAAA	AAAA	09; Cass
Marion	Marion	Giants		1,259	AAAA	AAAA	27; Grant
Muncie; Central	Muncie	Bearcats		945	AAA	AAAA	18; Delaware
New Castle	New; Castle	Trojans		1,196	AAAA	AAAA	33; Henry
Richmond	Richmond	Red Devils		1,542	AAAA	AAAA	89; Wayne

=== Northeast Corner Conference ===
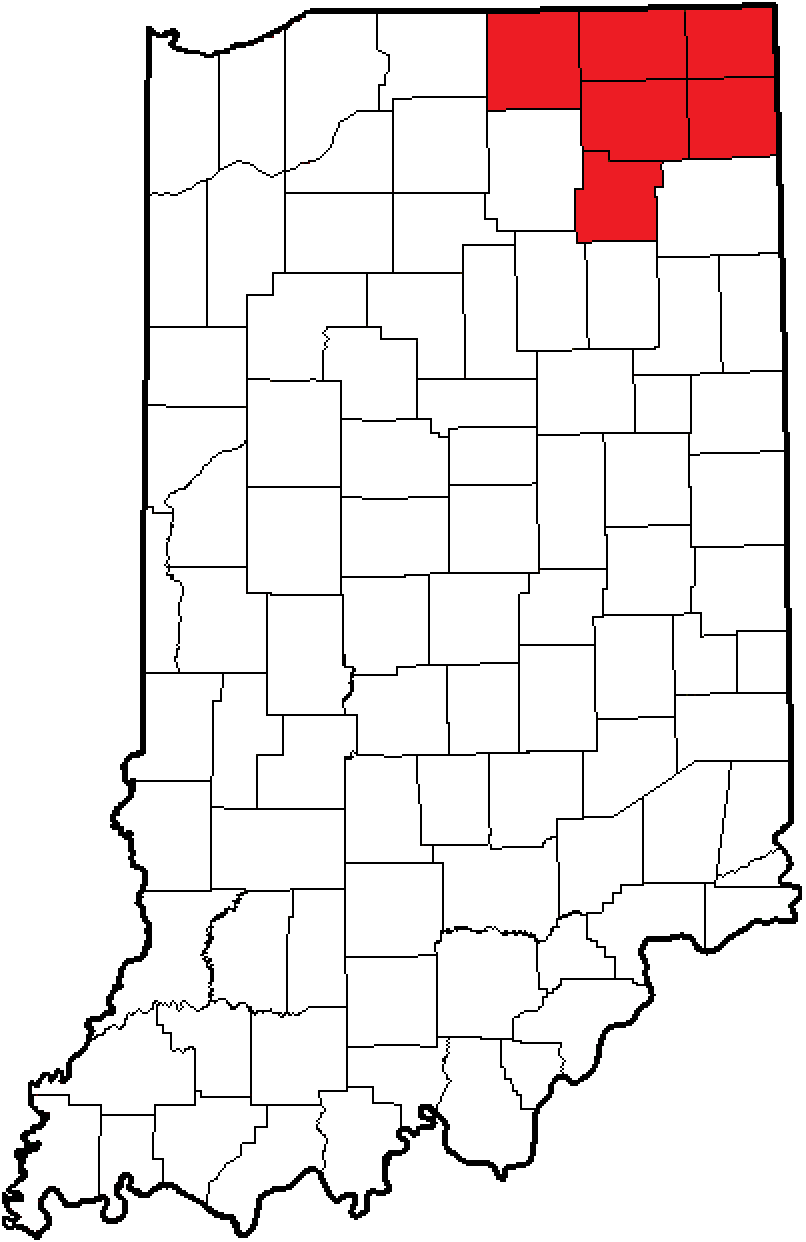
The Northeast Corner Conference in Indiana

School	Location	Mascot	Colors	Enrollment	IHSAA Class	IHSAA Football Class	# / County
Angola; Community	Angola	Hornets		963	AAA	AAAA	76; Steuben
Central; Noble	Albion	Cougars		416	AA	A	57; Noble
Churubusco	Churubusco	Eagles		427	AA	AA	92; Whitley
Eastside	Butler	Blazer		467	AA	AA	17; DeKalb
Fairfield	Goshen	Falcons		590	AAA	AAA	20; Elkhart
Fremont	Fremont	Eagles		375	AA	A	76; Steuben
Hamilton; Community	Hamilton	Marines		164	A	--	76; Steuben
LaGrange; Lakeland	LaGrange	Lakers		671	AAA	AAA	44; LaGrange
Prairie; Heights	LaGrange	Panthers		505	AA	AA	44; LaGrange
West; Noble	Ligonier	Chargers		739	AAA	AAA	57; Noble
Westview	Topeka	Warriors		397	AA	--	44; LaGrange

=== Northeast Hoosier Conference ===
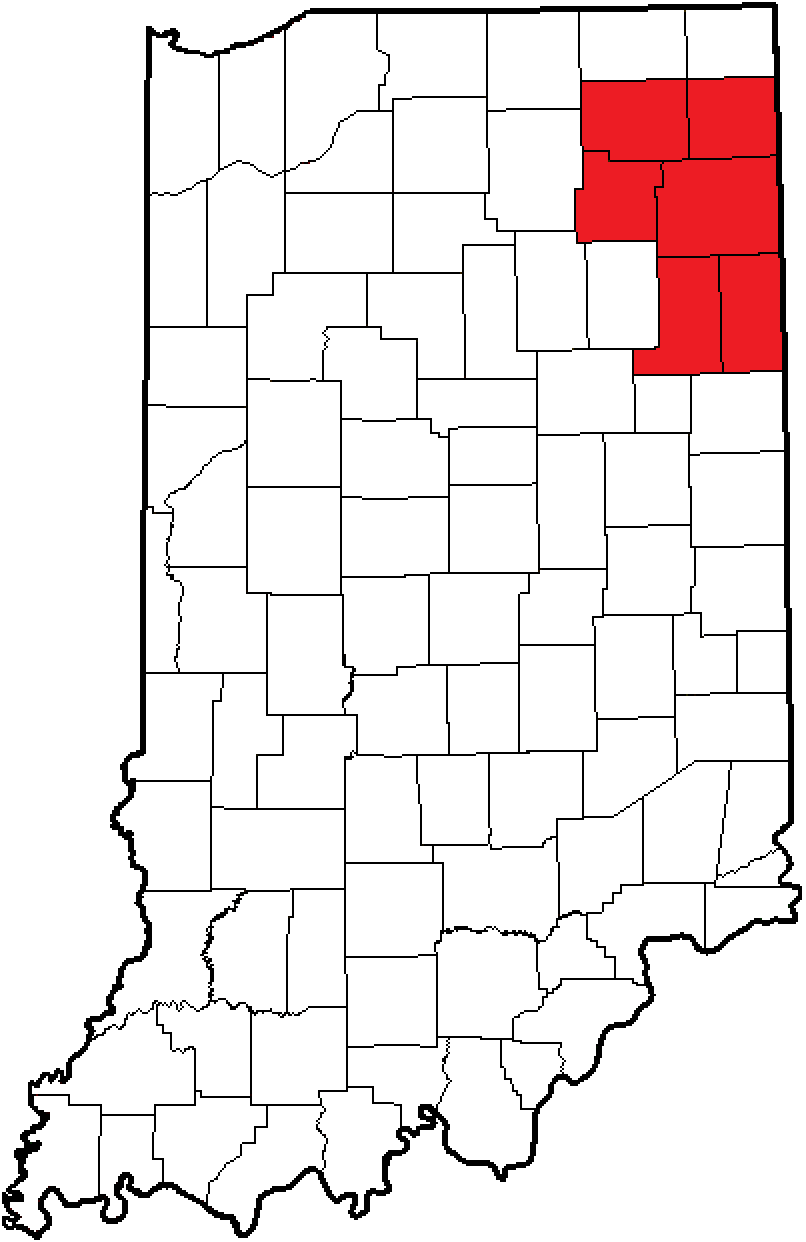
The Northeast Hoosier Conference in Indiana.

School	Location	Mascot	Colors	Enrollment	IHSAA Class	IHSAA Football Class	# / County
Bellmont	Decatur	Braves		801	AAA	AAA	01; Adams
Columbia; City	Columbia City	Eagles		1,149	AAAA	AAAA	92; Whitley
DeKalb	Waterloo	Barons		1,275	AAAA	AAAA	17; DeKalb
East; Noble	Kendallville	Knights		1,265	AAAA	AAAA	57; Noble
Fort Wayne; Carroll	Fort Wayne	Chargers		1,925	AAAA	AAAAA	02; Allen
Fort Wayne; Homestead	Fort Wayne	Spartans		2,219	AAAA	AAAAA	02; Allen
New Haven	New Haven	Bulldogs		1,129	AAAA	AAAA	02; Allen
Norwell	Ossian	Knights		855	AAA	AAA	90; Wells

=== Northern Indiana Athletic Conference ===
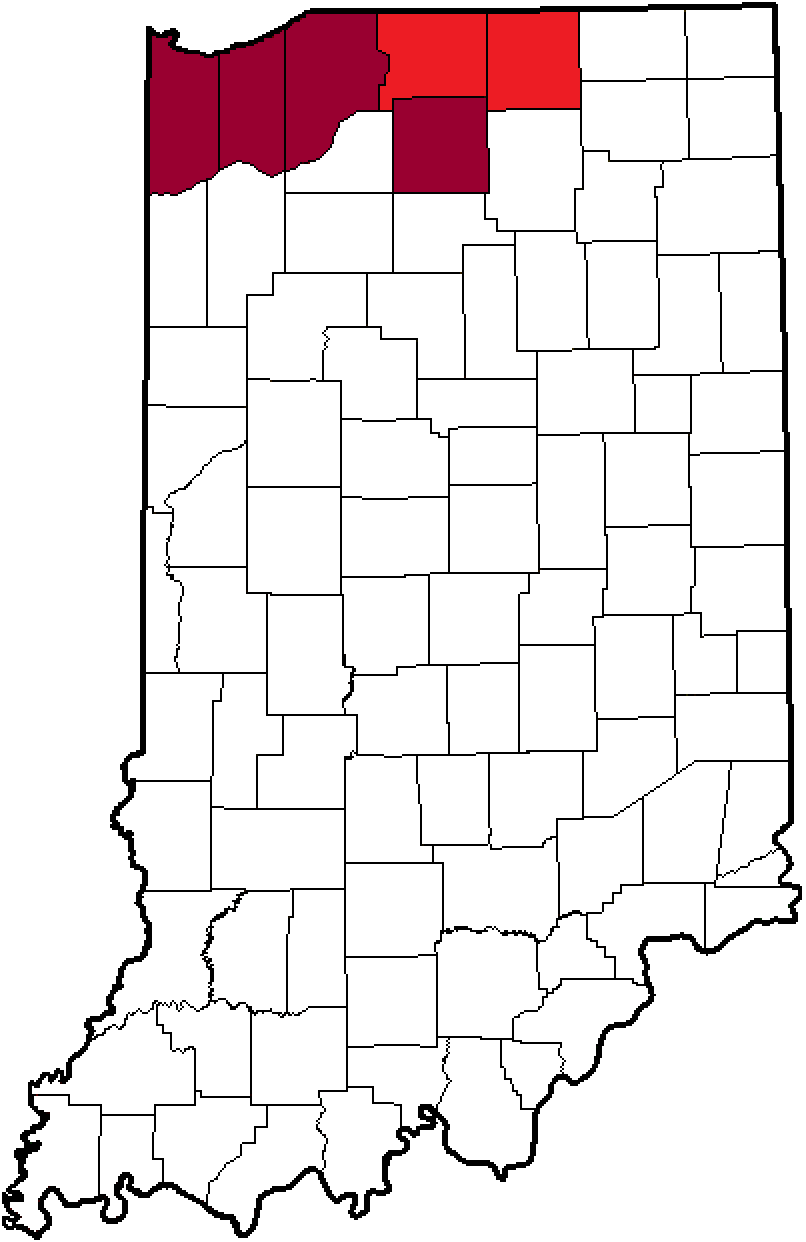
The Northern Indiana Athletic Conference in Indiana. Current Areas are in red, Former Areas are in Maroon

School	Mascot	Colors	Location	Enrollment	IHSAA Class	IHSAA Football Class	County
Elkhart; Central	Blue Blazers		Elkhart	1,800	AAAA	AAAAA	20; Elkhart
Mishawaka	Cavemen		Mishawaka	1,560	AAAA	AAAA	71; St. Joseph
Mishawaka; Marian	Knights		Mishawaka	676	AAA	AAA	71; St. Joseph
Penn	Kingsmen		Mishawaka	3,379	AAAA	AAAAA	71; St. Joseph
South Bend; Adams	Eagles		South Bend	1,655	AAAA	AAAAA	71; St. Joseph
South Bend; Clay	Colonials		South Bend	1,404	AAAA	AAAA	71; St. Joseph
South Bend; Riley	Wildcats		South Bend	1,484	AAAA	AAAA	71; St. Joseph
South Bend; St. Joseph's	Indians		South Bend	813	AAA	AAA	71; St. Joseph
South Bend; Washington	Panthers		South Bend	1,313	AAAA	AAAA	71; St. Joseph

=== Northern Lakes Conference ===
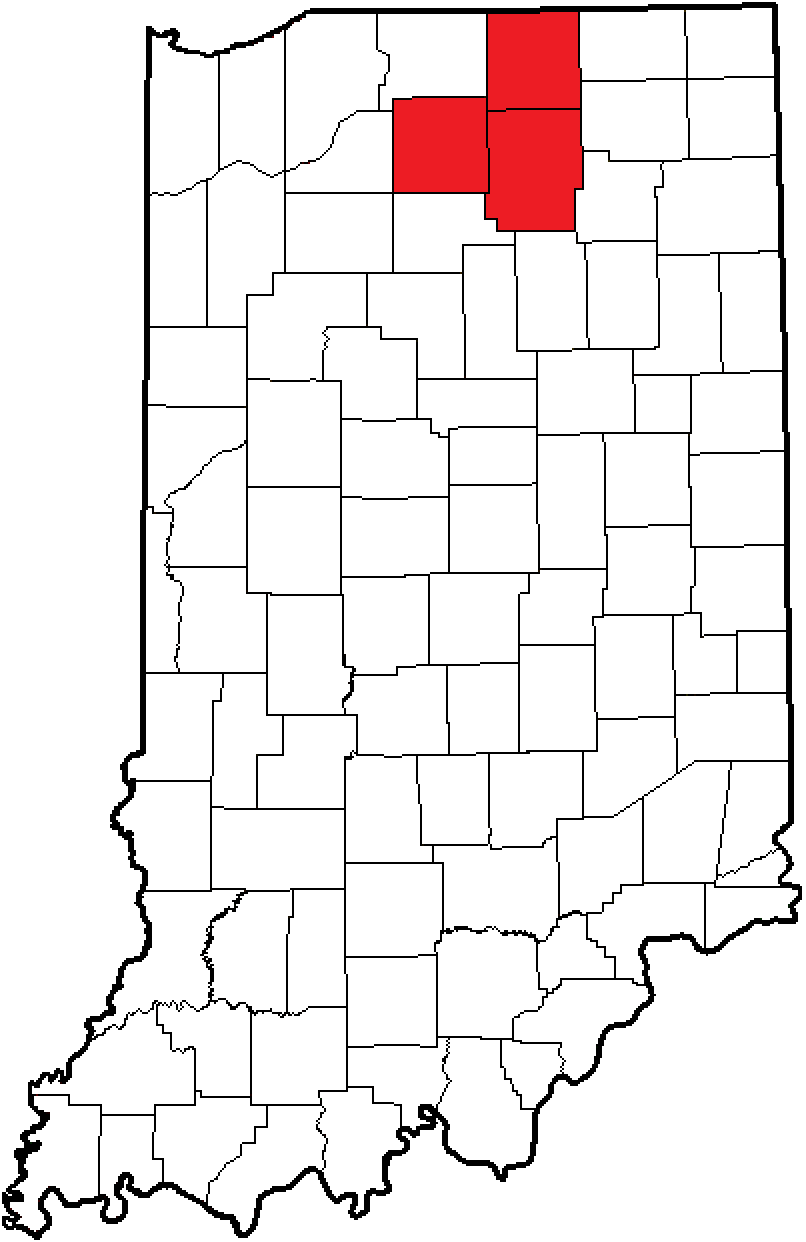
The Northern Lakes Conference within Indiana

School	Location	Mascot	Colors	Size	IHSAA Class	IHSAA Football Class	County
Concord	Elkhart, IN	Minutemen		1,449	AAAA	AAAA	20; Elkhart
Elkhart; Memorial	Elkhart, IN	Crimson; Chargers		1,829	AAAA	AAAAA	20; Elkhart
Goshen	Goshen, IN	Redskins		1,771	AAAA	AAAAA	20; Elkhart
Northridge	Middlebury, IN	Raiders		1,279	AAAA	AAAA	20; Elkhart
Northwood	Nappanee, IN	Panthers		891	AAA	AAAA	20; Elkhart
Plymouth	Plymouth, IN	Rockies / Pilgrims		1,066	AAA	AAAA	50; Marshall
Warsaw; Community	Warsaw, IN	Tigers		2,077	AAAA	AAAAA	43; Kosciusko
Wawasee	Syracuse, IN	Warriors		981	AAA	AAAA	43; Kosciusko

=== Northern State Conference ===
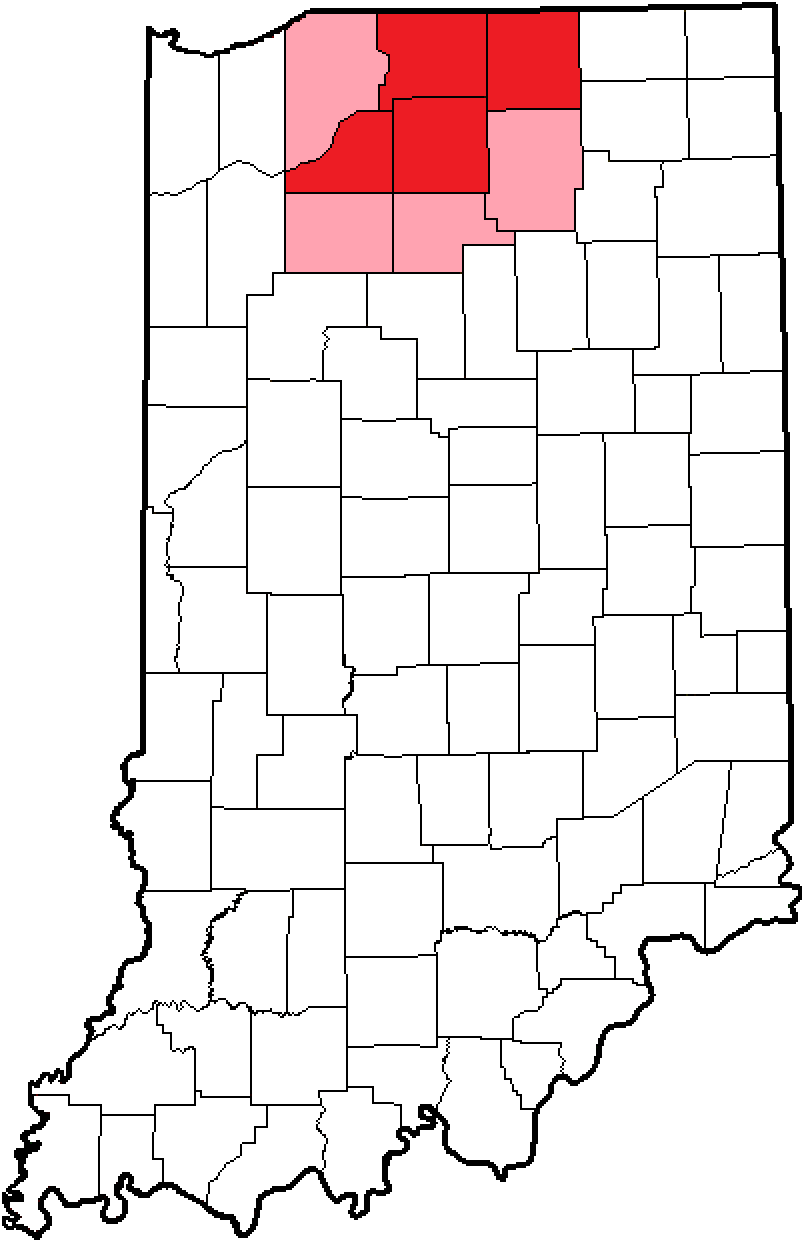
The Northern State Conference in Indiana. The counties in pink indicate multi-county high schools.

School	Location	Mascot	Colors	Enrollment	IHSAA Class	IHSAA Football Class	County (ies)
Bremen	Bremen	Lions		495	AA	AA	50; Marshall
Culver; Community	Culver	Cavaliers		287	A	A	50 Marshall; 25, 66, 75
Glenn	Walkerton	Falcons		605	AAA	AAA	71 St. Joseph; 46, 75
Jimtown	Elkhart	Jimmies		601	AAA	AAA	20; Elkhart
Knox; Community	Knox	Redskins		620	AAA	AAA	75; Starke
LaVille	Lakeville	Lancers		379	AA	A	71; St. Joseph
New; Prairie^{1}	New; Carlisle	Cougars		852	AAA	AAAA	46 LaPorte; 71 St. Joseph
Triton	Bourbon	Trojans		316	A	A	50 Marshall; 43 Kosciusko

^{1} New Prairie High is located on the LaPorte / St. Joseph county line.

=== Northwest Crossroads Conference ===
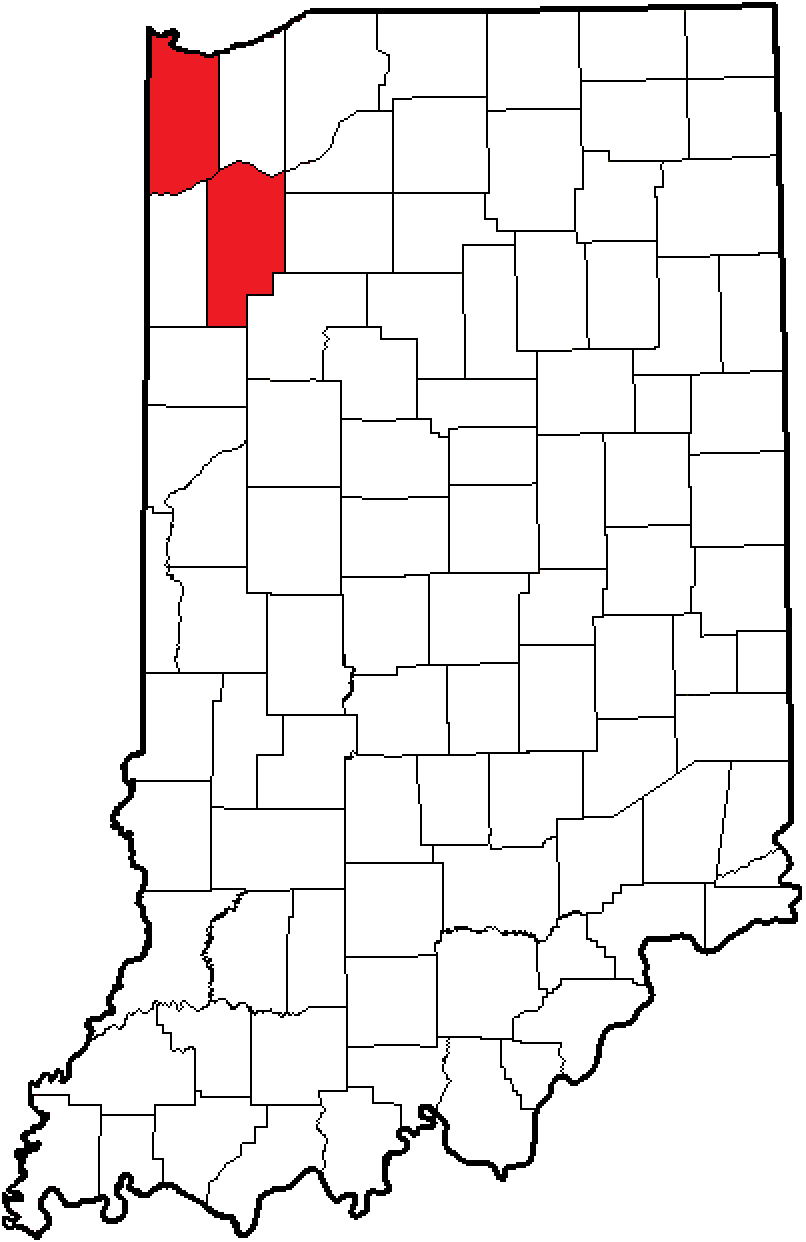
The Northwest Crossroads Conference in Indiana

School	Location	Mascot	Colors	Enrollment	IHSAA Class	IHSAA Football Class	# / County
Andrean	Merrillville	Fighting '59ers		587	AAA	AA	45; Lake
Griffith	Griffith	Panthers		925	AAA	AAAA	45; Lake
Highland	Highland	Trojans		1,175	AAAA	AAAA	45; Lake
Hobart	Hobart	Brickies		1,268	AAAA	AAAA	45; Lake
Kankakee; Valley	Wheatfield	Kougars		1,087	AAA	AAAA	37; Jasper
Lowell	Lowell	Red Devils		1,276	AAAA	AAAA	45; Lake
Munster	Munster	Mustangs		1,616	AAAA	AAAAA	45; Lake

=== Northwestern Conference ===
45 Lake County
Gary, Indiana

School	Mascot	Colors	Enrollment	IHSAA Class	IHSAA Football Class
Gary; Theodore Roosevelt	Panthers		936	AAA	AAAA
Gary; Lew Wallace	Hornets		791	AAA	AAA
Gary; West Side	Cougars		1,241	AAAA	AAAA

== See also ==
- Page 1: Allen County Conference - Metropolitan Interscholastic Conference
- Page 3: Ohio River Valley Conference - Western Indiana Conference
