= Midwest Athletic Conference (IHSAA) =

High school athletic conference

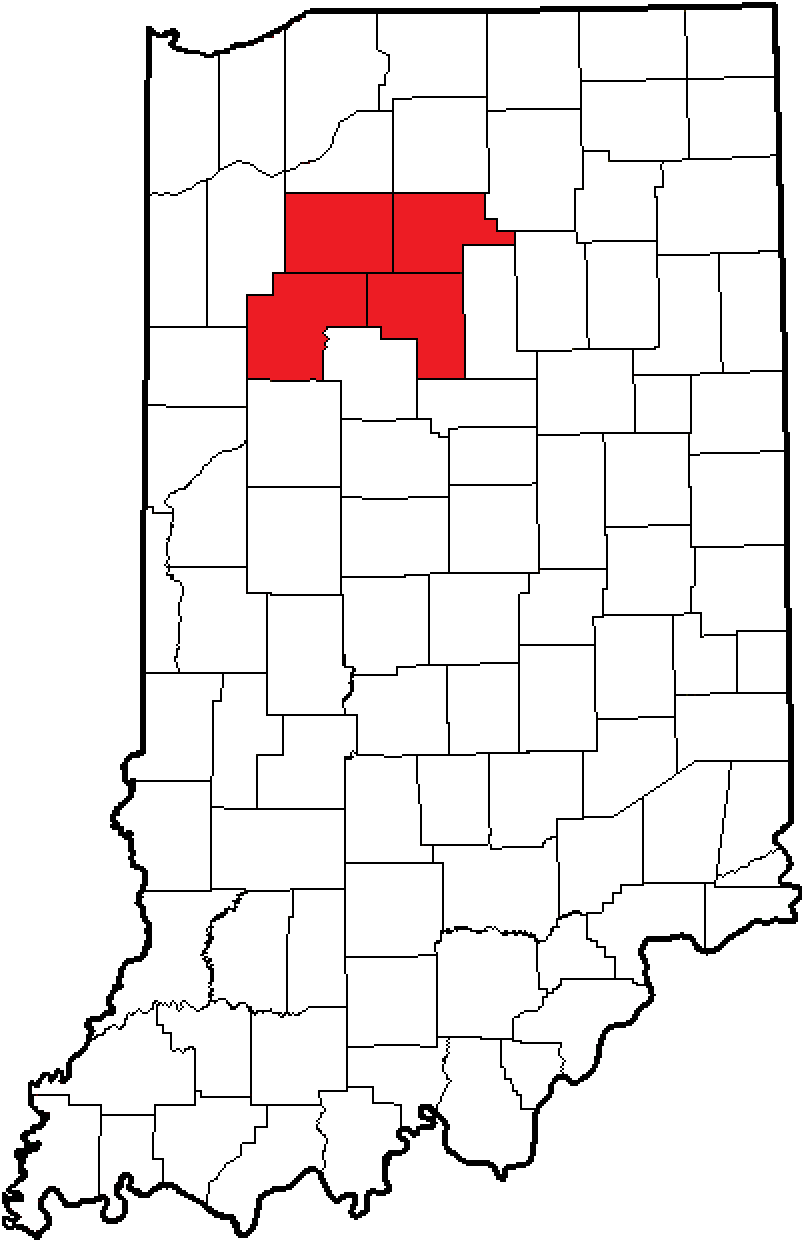
Location of Midwest members in Indiana

The Midwest Athletic Conference is a high school athletic conference in northwestern Indiana, which has existed in two different incarnations, with a third planned to form in 2018. The original conference began in 1932, consisting of schools that were larger than most of their counterparts in their local county leagues. The schools were based in Benton, Fountain, Jasper, Newton, Tippecanoe, Warren, and White counties. The forming of the Kankakee Valley Conference the next year caused a slight fluctuation over the next couple of years, as schools realigned themselves within the two leagues, with some schools claiming dual membership. The league folded in 1947, as size disparities and willingness to sponsor some sports (such as football, some schools played 11-man or 8-man football, and others didn't sponsor the sport) led to schools going their separate ways.

The second incarnation of the conference began in 1955 with eight schools located in Benton, Carroll, Cass, Newton, and White counties, with largely different members than its first lineup. The MAC had a tumultuous history of membership turnover for much of its history, but had stabilized at 10 members with West Central and Winamac joining in 1980 and 1981, respectively. The only changes over the next 34 years were Rossville and Carroll joining the Hoosier Heartland Conference in 1989 and 1992, respectively, leaving a stable 8 school membership for more than two decades. In 2013, Caston, Pioneer, and Winamac announced that they were leaving the Conference to join with 2 other schools from the Northern State Conference as well as Independent North Judson for the 2015–2016 school year. This touched off an exodus that ended the conference, as West Central joined Caston, Pioneer, and Winamac in the Hoosier North Athletic Conference, while Frontier and Tri-County joined the Hoosier Heartland Conference. South Newton joined the Sangamon Valley Conference of Illinois. North White was the only school that had not been accepted to another conference immediately, though they were accepted as a football-only member of the Hoosier Heartland. The Conference reformed in 2017, with six former schools rejoining.

== Membership ==
School	Location	Mascot	Colors	# / County	Enrollment 24–25	Class FB Class	Year joined	Previous conference
DeMotte Christian	DeMotte	Knights		37; Jasper	119	1A; N/A	2023	Independents
Faith; Christian	Lafayette	Eagles		79; Tippecanoe	269	1A; 1A	2023	Independents
Frontier^{1}	Chalmers	Falcons		91; White	180	1A; 1A	1965; 2018	none (new school); Hoosier Heartland
North Newton^{2}	Morocco	Spartans		56; Newton	319	1A; 1A	1967; 2018	Greater South Shore; Independents
North; White^{3}	Monon	Vikings		91; White	264	1A; 1A	1963; 2018	none (new school); Independents
South; Newton^{4}	Kentland	Rebels		56; Newton	241	1A; 1A	1966; 2018	none (new school); Sangamon Valley (IL)
Tri-County^{1}	Wolcott	Cavaliers		91; White	220	1A; 1A	1971; 2018	none (new school); Hoosier Heartland
West; Central^{5}	Francesville	Trojans		66; Pulaski	209	1A; 1A	1967; 1980; 2018	none (new school); Northwest Hoosier; Hoosier North

1. Played in the Hoosier Heartland Conference 2015–18.
2. Played in the NWHC 1975–98, as an Independent 1998-2007 and 2017–18, and in the GSSC 2007–17.
3. Played as an Independent (football played in Hoosier Heartland) 2015–18.
4. Played in the Sangamon Valley Conference (IL) 2015–18.
5. Played 1975–80 in the NWHC, and 2015–19 in the HNAC, playing 2018–19 in both conferences.

== Former members ==
School	Location	Mascot	Colors	# / County	Year joined	Previous conference	Year left	Conference joined
Attica	Attica	Red Ramblers		23; Fountain	1932	Fountain County	1947	Hoosier
Brook^{1}	Brook	Aces		56; Newton	1932; 1955	Newton County; Kankakee Valley	1947; 1966	Kankakee Valley none (consolidated into South Newton)
Fowler^{2}	Fowler	Bulldogs		04; Benton	1932; 1955	Benton County; Benton County	1947; 1968	Benton County none (consolidated into Benton Central)
Kentland^{1}	Kentland	Blue Devils		56; Newton	1932; 1955	Newton County; Kankakee Valley	1947; 1966	Kankakee Valley none (consolidated into South Newton)
Monticello	Monticello	Tioga Indians		91; White	1932	White County	1945	Central Indiana
Morocco^{1}	Morocco	Beavers		56; Newton	1932	Newton County	1947	Kankakee Valley
Pine Village^{3}	Pine Village	Pine Knots		86; Warren	1932	Warren County	1947	Warren County
Remington	Remington	Rifles		37; Jasper	1932; 1967	Jasper County; Prairie	1933; 1971	Kankakee Valley none (consolidated into Tri-County)
Rensselaer; Central^{4}	Rensselaer	Bombers		37; Jasper	1932	Jasper County	1947	Hoosier
Veedersburg^{5}	Veedersburg	Green Devils		23; Fountain	1932	Fountain County	1947	Fountain County
West Lafayette	West Lafayette	Red Devils		79; Tippecanoe	1932	Independents	1947	Hoosier
Williamsport^{3}	Williamsport	Bingy Bombers		86; Warren	1932	Warren County	1947	Warren County
Oxford^{6}	Oxford	Blue Devils		04; Benton	1933	Benton County	1947	Benton County
West Lebanon	West Lebanon	Clippers		86; Warren	1934	Warren County	1947	Warren County
Brookston	Brookston	Bombers		91; White	1955	White County	1965	none (consolidated into Frontier)
Camden	Camden	Red Devils		08; Carroll	1955	Carroll County	1965	none (consolidated into Delphi
Monon	Monon	Railroaders		91; White	1955	Kankakee Valley	1963	none (consolidated into North White)
Royal Center	Royal Center	Bulldogs		09; Cass	1955	Cass County	1963	none (consolidated into Royal Center)
Wolcott	Wolcott	Wildcats		91; White	1955	White County	1971	none (consolidated into Tri-County)
Francesville	Francesville	Zebras		66; Pulaski	1957	Tippecanoe Valley	1965	none (consolidated into West Central)
Klondike	West Lafayette	Nuggets		79; Tippecanoe	1961	Tippecanoe County	1970	none (consolidated into Harrison)
Pioneer	Royal Center	Panthers		09; Cass	1963	none (new school)	2015	Hoosier North
DeMotte	DeMotte	Indians		37; Jasper	1967	Kankakee Valley	1970	none (consolidated into Kankakee Valley)
Wheatfield	Wheatfield	Red Devils		37; Jasper	1967	Kankakee Valley	1970	none (consolidated into Kankakee Valley)
Kankakee; Valley	Wheatfield	Kougars		37; Jasper	1970	none (new school)	1972	Northwest Hoosier
Carroll	Flora	Cougars		08; Carroll	1977	Hoosier	1992	Hoosier Heartland
Rossville	Rossville	Hornets		12; Clinton	1977	Hoosier	1989	Hoosier Heartland
Caston	Fulton	Comets		25; Fulton	1978	Three Rivers	2015	Hoosier North
Winamac; Community	Winamac	Warriors		66; Pulaski	1981	Northwest Hoosier	2015	Hoosier North

1. Concurrently played in MAC and NCC 1932–33, and in MAC and KVC 1933–47.
2. Concurrently played in MAC and BCC 1932–47.
3. Concurrently played in MAC and WCC 1932–34.
4. Known as Rensselaer before 1939.
5. Concurrently played in MAC and FCAA 1932–47.
6. Concurrently played in MAC and BCC 1933–47.

== State Champs ==
=== North White High School ===
- Football (A) 1994

=== Pioneer High School ===
- Football (A) 1997

•Football (A) 2017

•Football (A) 2018

=== Tri-County High School ===
- Baseball (A) 1998

=== Faith Christian ===
- Girls soccer (2024)

== Resources ==
- IHSAA Conference Membership
- IHSAA State Champions
- IHSAA Directory
