= Kankakee Valley Conference =

Former Athletic conference in Indiana

The Kankakee Valley Conference, occasionally known as the Kankakee Valley Athletic Association, was an IHSAA-sanctioned conference in northwestern Indiana that lasted from 1933 until 1967. The conference formed as a merger of the Jasper and Newton county conferences, along with schools from the newly formed Porter County Conference wanting another league to compete in. The league would also add schools from Starke and White counties soon after forming. Other than adding LaCrosse from LaPorte County for a short time, the league did not stray from this footprint. The league was always closely tied with the Midwest Athletic Conference, with some schools playing in both conferences in the MAC's first incarnation, and many KVC schools either helped form the MAC's lineup in its reformation, or ended up moving to the league after the collapse of the KVC.

== Membership ==
School	Location	Mascot	Colors	County	Year joined	Previous conference	Year left	Conference joined
Brook^{1}	Brook	Aces		56; Newton	1933	Midwest/ Newton County	1955	Midwest
DeMotte	DeMotte	Indians		37; Jasper	1933	Jasper County	1967	Midwest
Fair Oaks	Fair Oaks	Cherokees		37; Jasper	1933	Jasper County	1965	none (consolidated into DeMotte)
Goodland	Goodland	Trojans		56; Newton	1933	Newton County	1956	Prairie
Hanging Grove	Hanging Grove	Hornets		37; Jasper	1933	Jasper County	1939	none (consolidated into Rensselaer Central)
Hebron^{2}	Hebron	Hawks		64; Porter	1933	Lake-Porter County	1967	Porter County
Kentland^{1}	Kentland	Blue Devils		56; Newton	1933	Midwest/ Newton County	1955	Midwest
Kouts^{2}	Kouts	Mustangs/ Fillies		64; Porter	1933	Lake-Porter County	1959	Porter County
Monon	Monon	Railroaders		91; White	1933	White County	1955	Midwest
Morocco^{1}	Morocco	Beavers		56; Newton	1933; 1958	MWC/NCC; Northern State	1954; 1967	Northern State none (consolidated into North Newton)
Mount Ayr	Mount Ayr	Ayrdales		56; Newton	1933	Newton County	1967	none (consolidated into North Newton)
Remington	Remington	Rifles		37; Jasper	1933	Midwest	1955	Prairie
Tefft	Tefft	Tigers		37; Jasper	1933	Jasper County	1965	none (consolidated into Wheatfield)
Wheatfield	Wheatfield	Red Devils		37; Jasper	1933	Jasper County	1967	Midwest
Hamlet^{3, 4}	Hamlet	Tigers		75; Starke	1935	Starke County	1957	Tippecanoe Valley
San Pierre^{3, 5}	San Pierre	Bulldogs		75; Starke	1935	Starke County	1959	Tippecanoe Valley
St. Joseph's Prep	Rensselaer	Pumas		37; Jasper	1942	none (joined IHSAA)	1947	none (school closed)
LaCrosse^{6}	LaCrosse	Tigers		46; LaPorte	1943	LaPorte County	1949	LaPorte County

1. Played concurrently in KVC and MAC 1933–47.
2. Played concurrently in KVC and PCC throughout duration in KVC.
3. Played concurrently in KVC and SCC 1935–48.
4. Played concurrently in KVC and TVAC 1956–57.
5. Played concurrently in KVC and TVAC 1956–59.
6. Played concurrently in KVC and LCC 1943–49.

== Resources ==
E.T. Pearl's Basketball Corner
