= Northwest Hoosier Conference =

The Northwest Hoosier Conference was an IHSAA-sanctioned conference based in northwestern Indiana. The conference was started by five schools in 1968, and faced numerous membership changes during its span. The far-flung conference folded in 1998, when four of its members joined other leagues, and the other three schools were unable to find suitable replacements.

== Membership List ==
School	Location	Mascot	Colors	County	Year joined	Previous Conference	Year left	Conference Joined
Knox	Knox	Redskins		75; Starke	1968	Independents	1982	Northern State
North Judson- San Pierre	North Judson	Bluejays		75; Starke	1968	Independents	1998	Independents (HNAC 2015)
Rensselaer Central	Rensselaer	Bombers		37; Jasper	1968	Independents	1998	Hoosier
Twin Lakes	Monticello	Indians		91; White	1968	Independents	1974	Hoosier
Winamac	Winamac	Warriors		66; Pulaski	1968	Hoosier	1981	Midwest
Kankakee Valley	Wheatfield	Kougars		37; Jasper	1972	Midwest	1998	Independents (LAC 2003)
Lake Station Edison	Lake Station*	Eagles		45; Lake	1974	Independents	1998	Lake
North Newton	Morocco	Spartans		56; Newton	1975	Midwest	1998	Independents (GSSC 2007)
West Central	Francesville	Trojans		66; Pulaski	1975	Midwest	1980	Midwest
River Forest	Lake Station	Ingots		45; Lake	1985	Independents	1998	Northland
Lowell	Lowell	Red Devils		45; Lake	1993	Lake Suburban	1998	Lake

- Lake Station was known as East Gary until 1977
