= Tippecanoe Valley Athletic Conference =

Former high school athletic conference in Indiana, United States

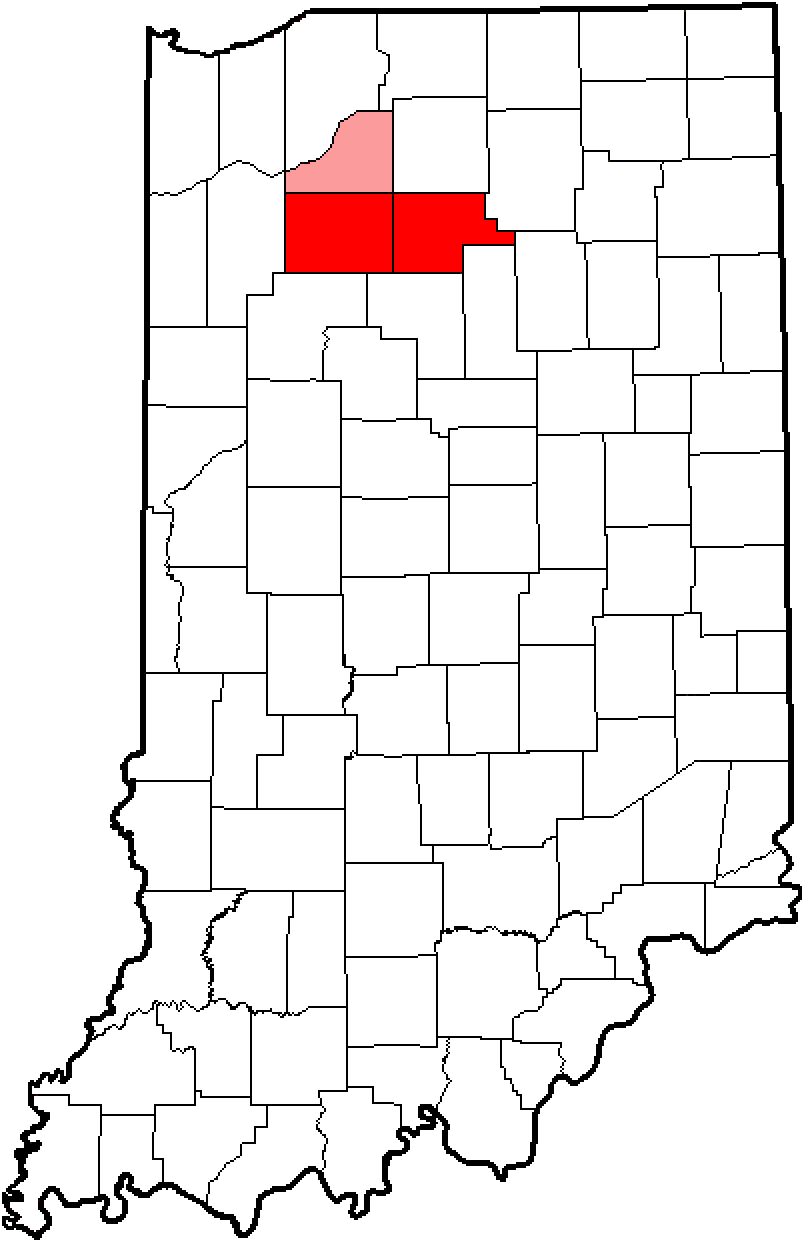
Location of the former TVAC in Indiana. Starke County is in pink, as all of its members were not in the conference by the time it folded.

The Tippecanoe Valley Athletic Conference was an IHSAA-sanctioned small-school conference in Fulton and Pulaski counties in northern Indiana. The conference formed as the Pulaski County Conference (earlier Athletic Association) in 1919, as all of the county schools outside of Winamac organized together.

The league expanded to add three Fulton County schools in 1955, and added three schools from Starke County its second year. However, by 1967 the league was down to four schools due to consolidation, and would close up shop after that season as three of those remaining schools were consolidated themselves.

== Membership ==
School	Location	Mascot	Colors	County	Year joined	Previous conference	Year left	Conference joined
Francesville	Francesville	Zebras		66; Pulaski	1919	Independents	1957	Midwest
Medaryville	Medaryville	Black Horses		66; Pulaski	1919	Independents	1967	none (consolidated into West Central)
Monterey	Monterey	Flyers		66; Pulaski	1919	Independents	1968	none (consolidated into Culver)
Pulaski	Pulaski	Warriors		66; Pulaski	1919	Independents	1957	none (consolidated into Winamac)
Star City	Star City	Stars		66; Pulaski	1919	Independents	1968	none (consolidated into Winamac)
Winamac	Winamac	Warriors		66; Pulaski	1919	Independents	1947	Hoosier
Aubbeenaubbee; Township	Leiters Ford	Braves		25; Fulton	1955	Fulton County	1968	none (consolidated into Culver)
Grass Creek	Grass Creek	Panthers		25; Fulton	1955	Fulton County	1961	none (consolidated into North Caston)
Kewanna	Kewanna	Indians		25; Fulton	1955	Fulton County	1968	Independents (MLC 1971)
Grovertown	Grovertown	Rams		75; Starke	1956	Independents (SCC 1948)	1963	none (consolidated into Oregon-Davis)
Hamlet^{1}	Hamlet	Tigers		75; Starke	1956	Kankakee Valley	1963	none (consolidated into Oregon-Davis)
San Pierre^{2}	San Pierre	Bulldogs		75; Starke	1956	Kankakee Valley	1963	none (consolidated into North Judson-San Pierre)
Richland Center	Richland Center	Wildcats		25; Fulton	1963	Fulton County	1965	none (consolidated into Rochester)
Oregon-Davis^{3}	Hamlet	Bobcats		75; Starke	1963	none (new school)	1967	South Lake Michigan

1. Played concurrently in TVAC and KVC 1956–57.
2. played concurrently in TVAC and KVC 1956–59.
3. Played concurrently in TVAC and SLMC 1965–67.
