= Northern State Conference =

The Northern State Conference (currently known as the Indiana Northern State Conference) is a high school athletic conference in Indiana that had previously disbanded in 2015, before being revived in 2024.

In 2013, Culver and Knox announced that they would be leaving the conference after the 2014–2015 school year in order to join the Hoosier North Athletic Conference with three schools from the Midwest Conference and Independent North Judson. LaVille and Triton decided to join the HNAC at the same time. The remaining four schools joined the Northern Indiana Athletic Conference, ending the conference at the time.

This conference was later revived in 2024 as the Indiana Northern State Conference; including 5 schools from the previous iteration of the conference (Bremen, Jimtown, John Glenn, Knox, and LaVille) and adding Tippecanoe Valley of the Three Rivers Conference.

== Current Members ==
School (IHSAA ID#)	Location	Mascot	Colors	# / County	Year joined	Previous conference	Year left	Conference Joined
Bremen	Bremen	Lions		50; Marshall	1958 1989 2024	Northern Lakes Northern Indiana	1962 2015	Northern Indiana
Glenn	Walkerton	Falcons		71; St. Joseph	1966 2024	none (new school) Northern Indiana	2015	Northern Indiana
Jimtown	Elkhart	Jimmies		20; Elkhart	1958 1966 2024	Elkhart County Northern Indiana	1963 2015	Northern Indiana
Knox	Knox	Redskins		75; Starke	1982 2024	Northwest Hoosier Hoosier North	2015	Hoosier North
LaVille	Lakeville	Lancers		71; St. Joseph	1966 2024	Marshall County Hoosier North	2015	Hoosier North
Tippecanoe Valley	Akron	Vikings		43; Kosciusko	2024	Three Rivers	N/A	N/A

== Former Members ==
School (IHSAA ID#)	Location	Mascot	Colors	# / County	Year joined	Previous conference	Year left	Conference Joined
Delphi	Delphi	Oracles		08; Carroll	1954	Hoosier	1956	Hoosier
Glenn	Walkerton	Falcons		71; St. Joseph	1966	none (new school)	2015	Northern Indiana
Jimtown	Elkhart	Jimmies		20; Elkhart	1958 1966	Elkhart County	1963 2015	Northern Indiana
LaVille	Lakeville	Lancers		71; St. Joseph	1966	Marshall County	2015	Hoosier North
New Carlisle	New Carlisle	Tigers		71; St. Joseph	1966	St. Joseph County	1968	none (consolidated into New Prairie)
North Liberty	North Liberty	Shamrocks		71; St. Joseph	1966	St. Joseph County	1981	none (consolidated into Glenn)
New Prairie	New Carlisle	Cougars		46 LaPorte; 71 St. Joseph	1968	none (new school)	2015	Northern Indiana
Fairfield	Goshen	Falcons		20; Elkhart	1969	Elkhart County	1980	Northeast Corner
Culver	Culver	Cavaliers		50; Marshall	1977	Independents (TRC 1976)	2015	Hoosier North
Triton	Bourbon	Trojans		50; Marshall	1980	Three Rivers	2015	Hoosier North
Knox	Knox	Redskins		75; Starke	1982	Northwest Hoosier	2015	Hoosier North
Bremen	Bremen	Lions		50; Marshall	1958 1989	Northern Lakes	1962 2015	Northern Indiana
Knox	Knox	Redskins		75; Starke	1954	Independents (SCC 1948)	1963	Independents (NWHC 1968)
Morocco	Morocco	Beavers		56; Newton	1954	Kankakee Valley	1958	Kankakee Valley
North Judson	North Judson	Blue Jays		75; Starke	1954	Independents (SCC 1948)	1963	Independents (NWHC 1968)
Rensselaer; Central	Rensselaer	Bombers		37; Jasper	1954	Independents (HAC 1949)	1958	Independents (NWHC 1968)
Washington- Clay	South Bend	Colonials		71; St. Joseph	1958	St. Joseph County	1963	St. Joseph County

1. Jimtown was known as Baugo Township until 1961.

== State championships ==
=== Bremen (2) ===
- 1989 Football (A)
- 1994 Football (2A)

=== Jimtown (6) ===
- 1974 Boys Gymnastics
- 1991 Football (A)
- 1997 Football (2A)
- 1998 Football (2A)
- 2004 Boys Basketball (2A)
- 2005 Football (2A)

=== Triton (4) ===
- 2000 Girls Basketball (A)
- 2001 Girls Basketball (A)
- 2001 Baseball (A)
- 2008 Boys Basketball (A)

== Resources ==
- IHSAA Conferences
- IHSAA Directory
