= Prairie Conference (IHSAA) =

Former athletic conference in Indiana, US

The Prairie Conference was an IHSAA-sanctioned conference located in Northwest Indiana. The conference began in 1955 and lasted until 1968, when four of its member schools consolidated into Benton Central, which had formed just two years earlier from two other conference schools. The conference was primarily based in Benton County, with nearby schools in Jasper, Newton, Tippecanoe, and later White counties also participating.

== Membership ==
School	City	Team name	Colors	County	Year joined	Previous conference	Year left	Conference joined
Ambia	Ambia	Wildcats		04; Benton	1955	Benton County	1968	none (consolidated into Benton Central)
Boswell	Boswell	Blackhawks		04; Benton	1955	Benton County	1968	none (consolidated into Benton Central)
Goodland	Goodland	Trojans		56; Newton	1955	Kankakee Valley	1966	none (consolidated into South Newton)
Montmorenci	Montmorenci	Tigers		79; Tippecanoe	1955	Tippecanoe County	1966	none (consolidated into Benton Central)
Otterbein	Otterbein	Red Devils		04; Benton	1955	Benton County	1966	none (consolidated into Benton Central)
Oxford	Oxford	Blue Devils		04; Benton	1955	Benton County	1968	none (consolidated into Benton Central)
Remington	Remington	Rifles		37; Jasper	1955	Kankakee Valley	1967	Midwest
Chalmers	Chalmers	Cardinals		91; White	1961	Western IN Small HS	1965	none (consolidated into Frontier)
Benton; Central	Oxford	Bison		04; Benton	1966	none (new school)	1968	Hoosier
