= Hoosier Athletic Conference =

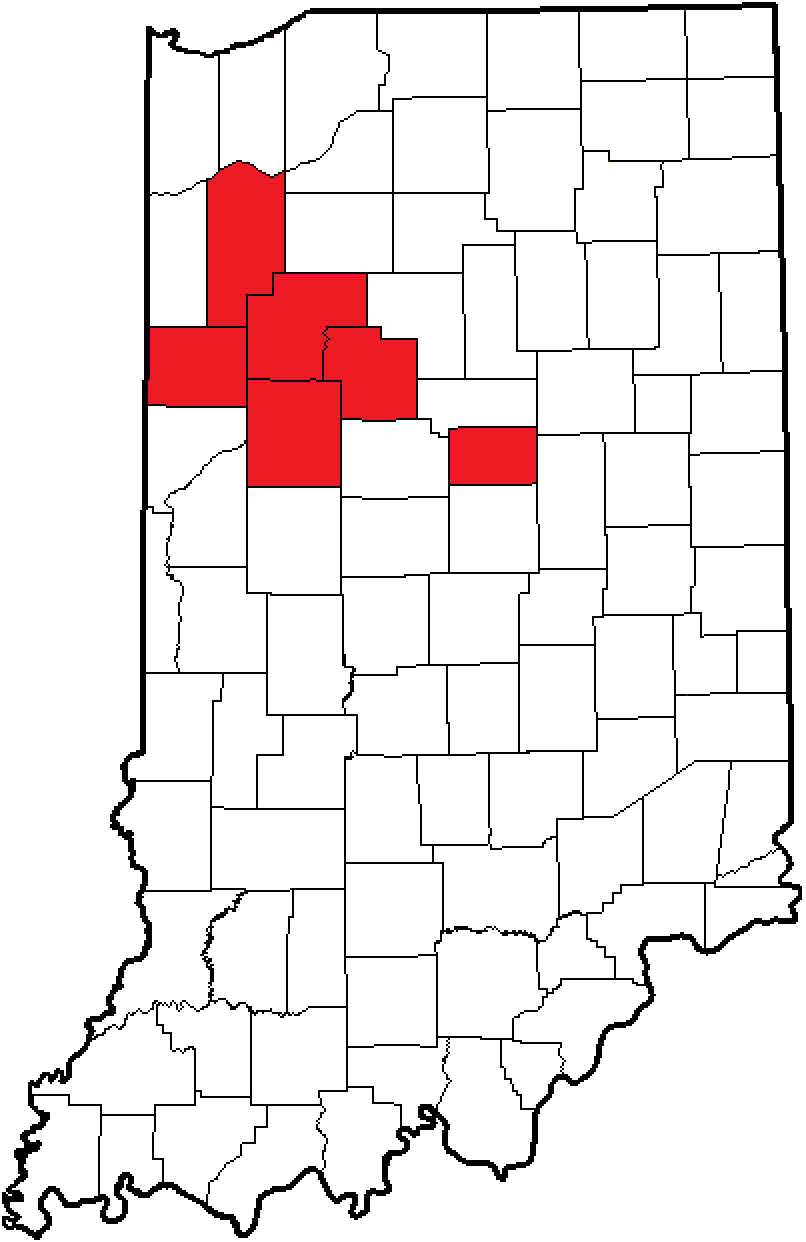
The Hoosier Athletic Conference in Indiana

The Hoosier Athletic Conference is a ten-member Indiana High School Athletic Association (IHSAA)-Sanctioned conference located within Benton, Cass, Hamilton, Howard, Jasper, Tippecanoe, Tipton and White counties. The conference first began in 1947, and has been in constant competition except for the 1997–98 school year, when membership dropped to three schools. The conference added four schools from the folding Mid-Indiana Conference in 2015. Lewis Cass exited the conference in 2023 and Logansport was added as the replacement starting in 2024. In 2024 Northwestern will exit the conference filling in for North Miami in the Three Rivers Conference.

== Membership ==
School	City	Team name	Colors	Enrollment 24–25	IHSAA Class	IHSAA Class Football	County	Year joined	Previous conference
Benton; Central	Oxford	Bison		513	2A	3A	04; Benton	1968	Prairie
Central; Catholic^{1}	Lafayette	Knights		302	1A	2A	79 Tippecanoe	1970; 2011	Independents; Hoosier Heartland
Hamilton; Heights	Arcadia	Huskies		687	3A	3A	29; Hamilton	2015	Mid-Indiana
Logansport	Logansport	Berries		1226	3A	4A	09; Cass	2024	North Central
Rensselaer; Central^{2}	Rensselaer	Bombers		447	2A	2A	37; Jasper	1947; 1998	Midwest; Northwest Hoosier
Tipton	Tipton	Blue Devils		454	2A	2A	80; Tipton	2000	Rangeline
Twin Lakes	Monticello	Indians		663	2A	3A	91; White	1974	Northwest Hoosier
West Lafayette	West Lafayette	Red Devils		750	3A	3A	79; Tippecanoe	1947	Midwest
Western (Howard)^{3}	Russiaville	Panthers		791	3A	3A	34; Howard	1958; 2015	Tri-County; Mid-Indiana

1. Central Catholic played from 1993 to 2011 in the HHC.
2. Rensselaer played from 1949 to 1954 and 1958 to 1968 as an independent, 1954 to 1958 in the old NSC, and 1968 to 1998 in the NWHC.
3. Western played from 1965 to 2015 in the MIC.

== Divisions ==
East	West
	Benton Central
Hamilton Heights	Central Catholic
Logansport	Rensselaer Central
Tipton	Twin Lakes
Western	West Lafayette

=== Former members ===
School	City	Team name	Colors	County	Year joined	Previous conference	Year left	Conference joined
Attica^{1}	Attica	Red Ramblers		23; Fountain	1947	Midwest	1971	Wabash River
Delphi	Delphi	Oracles		08; Carroll	1947; 1956; 1998	Carroll County; Northern State; Hoosier Heartland	1954; 1992; 2016^{2}	Northern State; Hoosier Heartland; Independents (HHC 2019)
Flora	Flora	Badgers		08; Carroll	1947	Carroll County	1961	none (consolidated into Carroll
Rossville	Rossville	Hornets		12; Clinton	1947	Clinton County	1977	Midwest
Winamac^{3}	Winamac	Warriors		66; Pulaski	1947	Pulaski County	1972	Northwest Hoosier
Sheridan^{4}	Sheridan	Blackhawks		29; Hamilton	1948; 2000	Hamilton County; Rangeline	1965; 2012	Mid-Capital; Hoosier Heartland
Southwestern	Lafayette	Wildcats		79; Tippecanoe	1958	none (new school)	1966	Mid-Central Conference
Carroll^{5}	Flora	Cougars		08; Carroll	1961	none (new school)	1977	Midwest
Clinton; Prairie^{4}	Frankfort	Gophers		12; Clinton	1961	none (new school)	1975	Rangeline
Harrison (West Lafayette)	West Lafayette	Raiders		79; Tippecanoe	1970	none (new school)	1997	Olympic
McCutcheon	Lafayette	Mavericks		79; Tippecanoe	1975	none (new school)	1997	Olympic
Cass	Walton	Kings		09; Cass	2015	Mid-Indiana Conference	2023	Three Rivers
Northwestern	Kokomo	Tigers		34 Howard	2015	Mid-Indiana Conference	2023	Three Rivers

1. Attica played in both the HAC and WRC from 1966 until leaving the HAC in 1971.
2. Delphi's school board voted to leave the HAC after 2015–16 in November 2015. The school refused to honor the football contracts for 2016–17 (schedules are made on a bi-yearly basis for football in Indiana), so the HAC decided to remove the school from the league effective immediately on December 17, 2015. Since the departure happened in the middle of the school year instead of during the summer, the exit date is listed as 2016, since the school completed the fall season sports as conference members.
3. Winamac played in both the HAC and NWHC from 1968 to 1972.
4. Sheridan played in both the HCC and HAC throughout its tenure in the HAC.
5. Carroll and Clinton Prairie were also members of the Mid-Central Conference from 1966 until 1975.

== Conference champions ==
=== Football ===
#	Team	Seasons
10	Harrison (WL)	1972*, 1975, 1986*, 1987, 1988*, 1989, 1990, 1992, 1995, 1996*
13	West Lafayette	1972*, 1981, 1985, 1988*, 1991, 1993, 1996*, 1999*, 2008, 2009, 2017, 2018, 2020, 2021, 2022
7	Delphi	1973, 1977, 1978, 1980, 1988*, 1999*, 2000*
6	Rensselaer Central	2001*, 2002*, 2004, 2005*, 2010, 2014
6	Lafayette Central Catholic	1972*, 2011, 2012, 2013, 2015 (W), 2016
4	Twin Lakes	1986*, 1998, 2000*, 2003
3	Benton Central	2000*, 2001*, 2002*
3	Sheridan	2005*, 2006, 2007
1	Hamilton Heights	2015 (E)
1	McCutcheon	1994
1	Tipton	2001*
1	Lewis Cass	2019
0	Carroll	
0	Cass	
0	Northwestern	
0	Western	

- Football was first sponsored in 1972. Unlisted seasons between 1974 and 1984 are unverified. There was no champion in 1997.

=== Boys' Basketball ===
#	Team	Seasons
10	West Lafayette	1950*, 1955*, 1960, 1962*, 1964, 2000*, 2006, 2007, 2014, 2018
7	Benton Central	1996*, 1999, 2000*, 2001, 2002, 2003, 2004
7	Tipton	2008, 2009, 2010, 2011, 2012, 2013, 2015*
6	Rossville	1948, 1953, 1969, 1970, 1971, 1974*
4	Attica	1950*, 1961, 1962*, 1968
4	Sheridan	1951, 1952, 1955*, 1957
3	McCutcheon	1994, 1995*, 1996*
3	Western	1963, 2021, 2022
2	Central Catholic	2015*, 2020
2	Harrison (WL)	1995*, 1997
2	Northwestern	2017 (E), 2019
2	Twin Lakes	2005, 2017 (W)
2	Winamac	1956, 1962*
1	Flora	1954
1	Hamilton Heights	2016
1	Rensselaer Central	2023
0	Carroll	
0	Cass	
0	Clinton Prairie	
0	Delphi	
0	Southwestern (Tipp)	

- The 1948–49, 1957–59, 1964–67, and 1971-93 champions are unverified. There was no champion in 1997–98.

=== Girls' Basketball ===
#	Team	Seasons
11	Benton Central	2003, 2005*, 2006, 2007*, 2009, 2010, 2011, 2013, 2014*, 2015. 2022
5	West Lafayette	2004, 2005*, 2007*, 2016, 2017 (W)
5	Twin Lakes	2001, 2002*, 2005*, 2008, 2023
4	Northwestern	2017 (E), 2018, 2019, 2020
2	Central Catholic	2014*, 2021
2	Tipton	2002*, 2012
0	Cass	
0	Delphi	
0	Hamilton Heights	
0	Harrison	
0	McCutcheon	
0	Rensselaer Central	
0	Sheridan	
0	Western	

- Seasons before 2000-01 are unverified.

== State champions ==
IHSAA State Champions

=== Cass Kings (3) ===
- Basketball- 2A (2003)
- Softball- 2A (2006)
- Softball- 2A (2008)

=== Central Catholic Knights (17) ===
- 1976 Football (A)
- 1998 Boys' Basketball (A)
- 1999 Football (A)
- 2000 Boys' Basketball (A)
- 2003 Boys' Basketball (A)
- 2004 Baseball (A)
- 2006 Girls' Basketball (A)
- 2007 Baseball (A)
- 2009 Baseball (A)
- 2009 Football (A)
- 2010 Baseball (A)
- 2010 Football (A)
- 2010 Volleyball (A)
- 2011 Baseball (A)
- 2019 Football (A)
- 2021 Girls' Volleyball (A)
- 2023 Baseball (A)

All championships before 2011-2012 school year as members of Hoosier Heartland Conference.

=== Northwestern Tigers (3) ===
- 2007 Boys' Basketball (2A)
- 2018 Girls' Basketball (3A)
- 2019 Girls' Basketball (3A)

=== Sheridan Blackhawks(9) ===
- 1980 Football (A)
- 1984 Football (A)
- 1987 Football (A)
- 1988 Football (A)
- 1992 Football (A)
- 1998 Football (A)
- 2005 Football (A)
- 2006 Football (A)
- 2007 Football (A)

=== Tipton Blue Devils (2) ===
- 1990 Softball
- 1994 Boys' Golf

=== Twin Lakes Indians(1) ===
- 1989 Softball

=== West Lafayette Red Devils(5) ===
- 1964 Boys' Cross Country
- 1993 Football (2A)
- 1998 Girls' Basketball (3A)
- 2009 Football (3A)
- 2013 Girls' Soccer (A)
- 2014 Boys' Cross Country
- 2018 Football (3A)

=== Western Panthers (5) ===
- 2018 Tyler Gilbert, Discus
- 2017 Tyler Gilbert, Discus
- 1988 Michelle Faulkner, 800 Meters
- 2001 Girls' Golf
- 2006 Brandon Youngdale, High Jump
- 2012 Baseball, (3A)
- 2014 Girls' Basketball, (3A)
- 1977 Joe Schwartz, Wrestling

=== Rensselaer Bombers (1) ===
- 2014 Football (2A)

== Resources ==
- IHSAA Conferences
- IHSAA Directory
