= Hoosier North Athletic Conference =

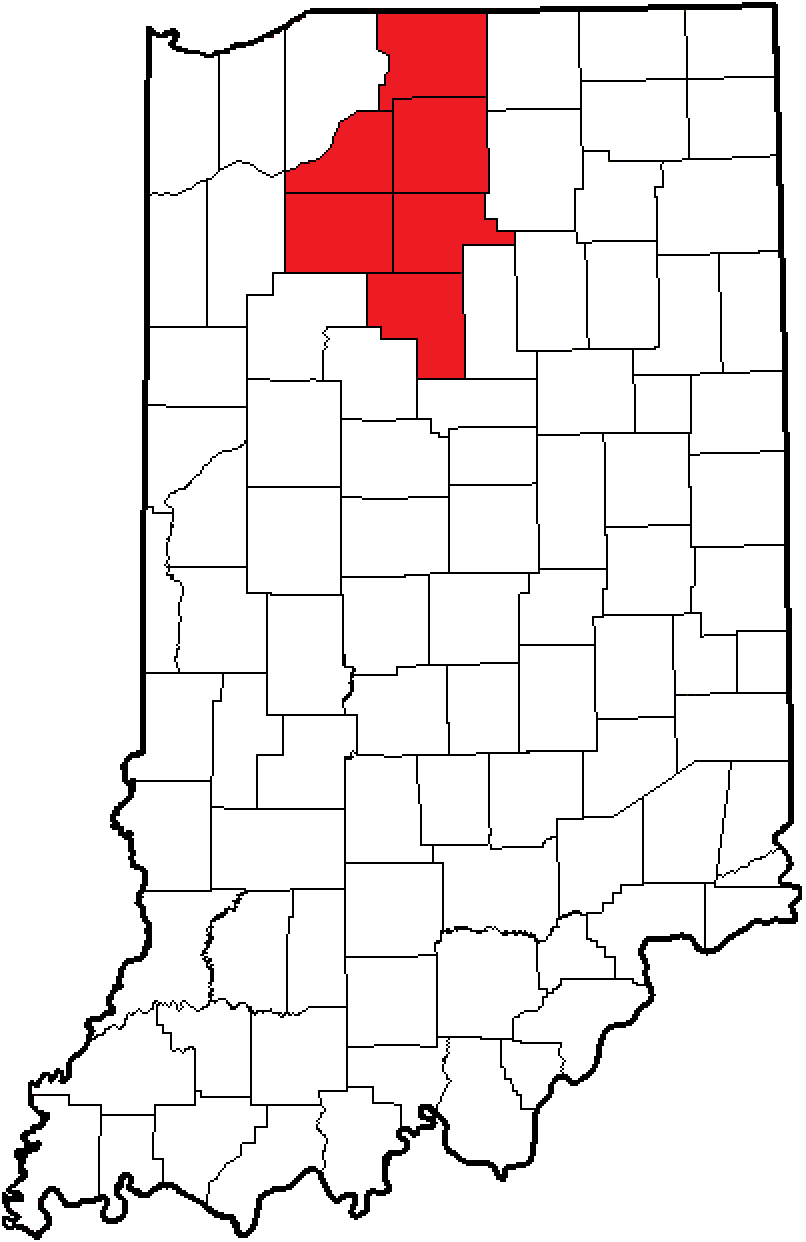
Location of Hoosier North members in Indiana

The Hoosier North Athletic Conference is an IHSAA-sanctioned conference in northwestern Indiana, that began in 2015. The conference contains eight schools in six counties (Cass, Fulton, Marshall, Pulaski, St. Joseph, and Starke), but may expand to include more schools in the future.

== History ==
- 2015: The Hoosier North Athletic Conference (HNAC) was formed by schools from the Northern State Conference (Culver, Knox, LaVille, and Triton), Midwest Conference (Caston, Pioneer, West Central, and Winamac), and then independent North Judson-San Pierre. The HNAC was formed in an effort to shorten travel distances and increase competition among member schools. The exodus of the 4 Northern State Conference teams caused that conference to fold, and forced other teams from Bremen, Jimtown, John Glenn, and New Prairie to join the Northern Indiana Conference.
- 2017: The West Central school board approved a measure to leave the Hoosier North Athletic Conference and re-join the Midwest conference, a move that, in accordance with HNAC bylaws, will be completed by the end of the 2018–19 school year.
- 2023: Knox and LaVille both announced their intentions to leave the Hoosier North Athletic Conference and join 3 teams from the Northern Indiana Conference (Bremen, Jimtown, and John Glenn) and a team from the Three Rivers Conference (Tippecanoe Valley) to form the Indiana Northern State Conference that will begin play in the 2024–2025 season.
- 2023: South Central (Union Mills) announced their intention to join the Hoosier North Athletic Conference as an affiliate member for football only starting in 2024 or 2025, leaving the Greater South Shore Conference and remaining in the Porter County Conference for all other sports.
- 2023: The Hoosier North Athletic Conference announced on May 18 that Argos and Oregon-Davis would be joining the conference. Neither of these schools has a football program and would participate in all other sports aside from football.
- 2023: It was announced that North Miami will join the Hoosier North Athletic Conference in 2024, bringing the conference to 8 schools for football and 9 schools for all other sports.

== Members ==
School	Location	Mascot	Colors	# / County	Enrollment 24–25	IHSAA Class Basketball/Football	Year joined	Previous conference
Argos	Argos	Dragons		50; Marshall	203	1A / N/A	2024	Hoosier Plains Conference
Caston	Fulton	Comets		25; Fulton	241	1A / 1A	2015	Midwest
Culver	Culver	Cavaliers		50; Marshall	246	1A / 1A	2015	Northern State
North Judson-San Pierre	North Judson	Blue Jays		75; Starke	308	1A / 1A	2015	Independents (NW Hoosier 1997)
North Miami	Denver	Warriors		52; Miami	263	1A / 1A	2024	Three Rivers
Oregon-Davis	Hamlet	Bobcats		75; Starke	137	1A / N/A	2024	Independents
Pioneer	Royal Center	Panthers		09; Cass	286	1A / 1A	2015	Midwest
South Central (Union Mills)^	Union Mills	Satellites		46; La Porte	318	N/A / 1A	2024	Greater South Shore
Triton	Bourbon	Trojans		50; Marshall	274	1A / 1A	2015	Northern State
Winamac	Winamac	Warriors		66; Pulaski	360	2A / 1A	2015	Midwest

^-Football only member

=== Former members ===
School	Location	Mascot	Colors	# / County	Year joined	Previous conference	Year left	Conference joined
West Central ^{1}	Francesville	Trojans		66; Pulaski	2015	Midwest	2019	Midwest
Knox	Knox	Redskins		75; Starke	2015	Northern State	2024	Indiana Northern State
LaVille	Lakeville	Lancers		71; St. Joseph	2015	Northern State	2024	Indiana Northern State

1. Played concurrently in HNAC and MWC 2018–19.

=== Membership timeline ===
Full Member Full Member (Non-Football) Football Associate Member

== Conference champions ==
=== Football ===
Titles	School	Years
7	Pioneer	2015, 2016, 2017, 2018, 2019, 2021*, 2025
2	North Judson-San Pierre	2021*, 2024
1	LaVille	2022
1	Knox	2023
1	Winamac	2021*
0	Caston	
0	Culver	
0	North Miami	
0	Triton	
0	South Central	
0	West Central	

- 2020: No champion because of the COVID-19 pandemic. Several games were not played. Pioneer finished in the standings at first with a (5–0) record without playing LaVille or Winamac.
- 2021: There was no formally declared conference champion in 2021 anywhere on the official HNAC website. This was because of the impact of the COVID-19 pandemic. AlmanacSports.com does cite that there was a three-way conference champion between Winamac, Pioneer, and North Judson-San Pierre. The top four schools in the conference standings at the end of the regular season were as follows:

1. Winamac (5–0): Did not play LaVille or North-Judson San Pierre.
2. Pioneer (6–1): Loss to Winamac.
3. North-Judson-San Pierre (5–1): Loss to Pioneer and did not play Winamac.
4. LaVille (4–2): Losses to Pioneer and North Judson-San Pierre; did not play Winamac.

- Interestingly, LaVille avenged a loss to conference foe Pioneer in their respective sectional. LaVille beat Pioneer 41–0 in the Class 2A Sectional 34 Championship, avenging their 12–7 loss in the regular season. Additionally, North Judson-San Pierre triumphed over Winamac 40–13 in the Class 1A Sectional 41 Semifinal. This was their only meeting in 2021 because their regular season matchup was cancelled due to the COVID-19 pandemic.

According to John Harrell, Pioneer was given credit for the 2020 conference championship with a (5–0) record, and Winamac was given credit for the 2021 conference championship with a (5–0) record, without it being shared with Pioneer and North Judson.

=== Boys basketball ===
Titles	School	Years
3	LaVille	2018, 2019, 2021
3	Triton	2017, 2024, 2025
2	North Judson- San Pierre	2020, 2023
1	Pioneer	2016
1	Winamac	2016
1	Caston	2022
0	Argos	
0	Culver	
0	Oregon-Davis	
0	Knox	
0	West Central	

Pioneer and Winamac were co-champions in 2016.

=== Girls basketball ===
Titles	School	Years
5	North Judson-San Pierre	2017, 2018, 2019, 2021, 2025
2	Caston	2023, 2024
1	Knox	2020
1	Triton	2016
1	Pioneer	2022
0	Argos	
0	Culver	
0	LaVille	
0	Oregon-Davis	
0	West Central	
0	Winamac	

== Baseball ==
Titles	School	Years
3	Laville	2017, 2018, 2019
2	Winamac	2021, 2022
1	Caston	2024
1	North Judson-San Pierre	2023
1	North Miami	2015
1	Pioneer	2016
1	Triton	2026
0	Culver	
0	West Central	
0	Knox	

== Softball ==
Titles	School	Years
4	Pioneer	2016, 2018, 2019, 2021
3	Winamac	2017, 2025, 2026
3	Caston	2022, 2023, 2024
0	Argos	
0	Knox	
0	LaVille	
0	North Judson-San Pierre	
0	Oregon-Davis	
0	Triton	
0	West Central	

== State championships ==
=== Pioneer (6) ===
- 2017 Football (1A)
- 2018 Softball (1A)
- 2018 Football (1A)
- 2020 Volleyball (1A)
- 2021 Girls' Basketball (1A)
- 2021 Softball (2A)

=== North Judson (1) ===
2018 Volleyball (2A)

== Math contest ==
The Conference hosts a math tournament every school year at different schools within the conference.
