= DCSC =

DCSC may refer to:

- Defense Construction Supply Center
- Delphi Community School Corporation
- Dimension Cavalry Southern Cross
