= Tri-County Middle/Senior High School =

Tri-County Middle-Senior High School

Location
- 11298 West 100 South; Wolcott, White County, Indiana 47995; United States; 40.734871°N 87.085389°W

Information
- Type: Public high school
- Established: 1971
- School district: Tri-County School Corporation
- Superintendent: Ed Eiler (interim)
- Principal: J.R. Haskins
- Teaching staff: 35.33 (FTE)
- Grades: 7-12
- Enrollment: 333 (2023–2024)
- Student to teacher ratio: 9.43
- Color
- Athletics conference: Midwest Athletic Conference (IHSAA)
- Team name: Cavaliers
- Rivals: south newton, frontier, north white
- Newspaper: The New Wolcott Enterprise
- Website: Official Website

Tri-County Middle-Senior High School is a public high school located in Wolcott, Indiana.

== Athletics ==

Tri-County Middle-Senior High School's athletic teams are the Cavaliers and they compete in 1A class sports and formerly in the Hoosier Heartland Conference. Tri-County was a former member of the Midwest Athletic Conference (IHSAA). They will rejoin with the Midwest Athletic Conference (IHSAA) in the 2018 school year. The school offers a wide range of athletics including:

- Baseball (1998 state baseball 1A champions. 2000 state baseball 1A runners-up.)
- Basketball (Men's and Women's)
- Cheerleading
- Cross Country (Men's and Women's)
- Football
- Golf (Men's and Women's)
- Softball
- Track and Field (Men's and Women's)
- Volleyball
- Wrestling

== FFA ==
FFA chapter was #1 in the state for the year 2000. In 2017, member Blayne Vandeveer won the National FFA Creed speaking contest. In 2018, Tri-County FFA member, Micah Lehe won the National FFA Extemporaneous Speaking contest. The chapter has had numerous members compete at the national level in contests including Agriscience, Agricultural Issues, Marketing, and Veterinary Science. The advisors are Travis Scherer and Haley Verhaeghe.

== See also ==
- List of high schools in Indiana
