= Delphi Community School Corporation =

School district in Indiana

Coordinates: 40°34′34.0″N 86°40′07.4″W

Delphi Community School Corporation (DCSC) is a school district headquartered in Delphi, Indiana.

== Schools ==
- Delphi Community High School
- Delphi Community Middle School
- Delphi Community Elementary School
- Camden Early Childhood Center
