= Laville Junior-Senior High School =

Laville Jr-Sr High School

Location
- 69969 US 31 South; Lakeville, St. Joseph County County, Indiana 46536; United States; 41.478330°N 86.303337°W

Information
- Type: Public high school
- School district: LaVille Community Schools
- Superintendent: Keith Burke
- Principal: Michael Edison
- Teaching staff: 38.00 (FTE)
- Grades: 7-12
- Enrollment: 554 (2023-2024)
- Student to teacher ratio: 14.58
- Color
- Athletics conference: Hoosier North Athletic Conference
- Team name: Lancers
- Website: Official website

Laville Junior-Senior High School is a public high school located in Lakeville, Indiana.

== Athletics ==
Laville Junior-Senior High School's athletic teams are the Lancers and they compete in the Hoosier North Athletic Conference. The school offers a wide range of athletics including:

- Baseball
- Basketball (Men's and Women's)
- Cheerleading
- Cross Country (Men's and Women's)
- football
- Golf (Men's and Women's)
- Soccer (Men's and Women's)
- Softball
- Tennis (Men's and Women's)
- Track and Field (Men's and Women's)
- Volleyball
- Wrestling

=== Football ===
The 2015 Laville Junior-Senior High School Varsity football team went 9–3 overall in the season, losing to Northfield High School in the Sectional Championships on November 6, 2015.

== See also ==
- List of high schools in Indiana
