= Attica Junior-Senior High School =

Location
- 211 East Sycamore Street; Attica, Fountain County, Indiana 47918; United States
- 40.277379°N 87.250640°W

Information
- Type: Public high school
- Principal: Barbi Balensiefer
- Teaching staff: 28.50 (FTE)
- Grades: 6-12
- Enrollment: 290 (2024–2025)
- Student to teacher ratio: 10.18
- Color
- Team name: Red Ramblers
- Website: Official website

Attica Junior-Senior High School is a middle school and high school located in Attica, Indiana.

== See also ==
- List of high schools in Indiana
