= Delphi Community High School =

Location
- 501 Armory Road; Delphi, Indiana 46923; United States
- Coordinates: 40°34′31″N 86°39′57″W

Information
- Type: Public
- School district: Delphi Community School Corporation
- Principal: Ann-Marie Circle
- Teaching staff: 39.00 (on an FTE basis))
- Grades: 9-12
- Enrollment: 417 (2023–2024)
- Student to teacher ratio: 10.69
- Color
- Athletics conference: Hoosier Heartland Conference
- Team name: Oracles
- Website: Delphi Community High School Website

Delphi Community High School is a public secondary school located in Delphi, Indiana. The school serves more than 500 students in grades 9 to 12 in the Delphi Community School Corporation district. The students of Delphi Community School Corporation reside in the cities of Delphi and Camden, as well as in the townships of Deer Creek, Madison, Jackson, Liberty, Rock Creek, and Tippecanoe.

== Athletics ==
Delphi Community High School competes in the Hoosier Athletic Conference. The school mascot is the Oracle and the school colors are black and gold.

=== Fall ===
- Varsity Soccer
- Varsity Football
- Boys/Girls Cross Country
- Varsity Boys Tennis
- Varsity Girls Volleyball
- Varsity Cheerleading

=== Winter ===
- Girls Varsity Basketball
- Boys Varsity Basketball
- Boys Varsity Wrestling
- Boys/Girls Varsity Swimming

=== Spring ===
- Varsity Baseball
- Varsity Golf
- Varsity Boys/Girls Track
- Varsity Girls Tennis
- Varsity Girls Softball

== Clubs ==
- FFA
- National Honor Society
- Class Officers
- Fellowship of Christian Athletes
- Chess Club
- French Club
- Spanish Club

== Notable alumni ==
- Amanda Overmyer – American Idol (season 7) contestant
- Dick the Bruiser – former professional wrestler
- Doxie Moore – former professional basketball player for the Sheboygan Red Skins, Anderson Packers and the Milwaukee Hawks

== See also ==
- List of high schools in Indiana
- Hoosier Athletic Conference
- Delphi, Indiana
