= Twin Lakes High School =

Twin Lakes Senior High School

Location
- 300 South 3rd Street; Monticello, White County, Indiana 47960; United States
- 40.741749°N 86.770170°W

Information
- Type: Public high school
- School district: Twin Lakes School Corporation
- Principal: Melissa Whitehead
- Faculty: 52.00 (on an FTE basis)
- Grades: 9-12
- Enrollment: 663 (2023-24)
- Student to teacher ratio: 12.75
- Colors: Red and White
- Athletics conference: Hoosier Athletic Conference
- Team name: Indians
- Website: Official website

Twin Lakes Senior High School is a public high school located in Monticello, Indiana.

Twin Lakes Senior High School was formed from the consolidation of Monticello High School and two other local high schools.

== Athletics ==
Twin Lakes Senior High School's athletic teams are the Indians and they compete in the Hoosier Athletic Conference. The school offers a wide range of athletics including:

- Baseball
- Basketball (Men's and Women's)
- Cheerleading
- Cross Country
- Football
- Golf (Men's and Women's)
- Soccer (Men's and Women's)
- Softball
- Swimming (Men's and Women's)
- Tennis (Men's and Women's)
- Track and Field (Men's and Women's)
- Volleyball
- Wrestling

== See also ==
- List of high schools in Indiana
