= Caston Jr./Sr. High School =

Location
- 987 West 750 South; Fulton, Fulton County, Indiana 46931; United States; 40.947805°N 86.259177°W

Information
- Type: Public high school
- Principal: Chuck Evans
- Teaching staff: 33.00 (FTE)
- Grades: 7–12
- Enrollment: 434 (2023–2024)
- Student to teacher ratio: 13.15
- Color
- Athletics conference: Hoosier North Athletic Conference
- Team name: Comets
- Website: jrsrhigh.caston.k12.in.us

Caston Jr./Sr. High School is a middle school and high school located in Fulton, Indiana, United States. It is part of Caston School Corporation, which also includes Caston Elementary School. The two share a single campus and main building.

== See also ==
- List of high schools in Indiana
