= Knox Community High School =

Location
- 1 Redskin Trail; Knox, Starke County, Indiana 46534; United States; 41°17′10″N 86°37′25″W

Information
- Type: Public high school
- Established: 1894
- School district: Knox Community School Corporation
- Superintendent: Greg Mikulich
- Principal: Sam Ells
- Teaching staff: 44.83 (FTE)
- Grades: 9 to 12
- Enrollment: 500 (2024-2025)
- Student to teacher ratio: 11.15
- Colors: Red, white, and blue
- Athletics conference: Northern State Conference
- Mascot: Indian
- Team name: Redskins
- Website: Official Website

Knox Community High School is the only high school in Knox, Indiana. Knox is located centrally in Starke County, in the northwest/north central part of the state.

== General information ==
Knox High School is a public school that houses approximately 524 students in grades 9–12. As of 2025, the school's principal is Mr. Sam Ells.

There were 57 full-time faculty and staff members, two administrators, one full-time athletic director, and two guidance counselors as of the 2023–24 school year. Knox High School has over 100 course offerings.

The mascot is an Indian. The school colors are red, white, and blue.

== History ==
Knox Public School was established in 1894 and graduated its first student (Harry Hostetter) in 1896. In 1899, Knox High School became the first high school in Northern Indiana to publish a newspaper, The Eclipse.

In 1927, Knox High School dedicated a new gymnasium. Knox High School was able to grow in enrollment following the closure of North Bend School in 1931. A new gym was built on Culver Road in 1955; a new high school was also built and opened in 1975.

== Athletics ==
The Knox Redskins compete in the Northern State Conference. The school offers 18 varsity (V) and 11 junior varsity (JV) sports teams.

=== Junior Varsity ===
- Baseball
- Basketball (plus Boy's Freshmen Team)
- Football (plus Freshmen Team)
- Golf (Boy's)
- Softball
- Tennis
- Volleyball (plus Freshmen Team)

=== Varsity ===
- Baseball
- Basketball
- Cheerleading
- Cross Country
- Diving
- Football
- Golf
- Gymnastics
- Softball
- Swimming
- Tennis
- Track and Field
- Volleyball
- Wrestling

== Extracurricular clubs ==
Knox Community High School offers several extracurricular clubs including: Students Against Drunk Driving (SADD), National Honors Society (NHS), Student Council, and Academic Super Bowl. The school also has an HNAC academic team, spell bowl team, and competitive science teams.

== Music and art ==
Knox Community High School (KCHS) offers several performance ensembles. KCHS currently has choir and percussion ensemble, as well as concert, jazz, and marching band. Additionally, KCHS offers color and winter guard and has a Redskins Brigade. Each year, KCHS puts on a fall play and a spring musical.

== Awards and honors ==
Knox Community High School has received multiple Bronze Medal ratings in the U.S. News/School Matters Best High Schools survey.

Knox was first named as one of the NAMM Foundation's "Best Communities for Music Education" in 2016, an honor that it has maintained annually.

== See also ==
- List of high schools in Indiana
- Native American mascot controversy
- Sports teams named Redskins
