= North White High School =

North White Junior-Senior High School

Location
- 305 East Broadway; Monon, White County, Indiana 47959; United States; 40.866976°N 86.875592°W

Information
- Type: Public high school
- School district: North White School Corporation
- Superintendent: Nick Eccles
- Principal: Scott Van Der Aa
- Teaching staff: 19.50 (FTE)
- Grades: 9-12
- Enrollment: 264 (2023-2024)
- Student to teacher ratio: 13.54
- Color
- Athletics conference: Midwest Conference
- Team name: Vikings
- Rivals: Frontier Falcons
- Website: Official Website

North White Junior-Senior High School is a public high school located in Monon, Indiana.

== Athletics ==
North White Junior-Senior High School's athletic teams are the Vikings and they compete in the IHSAA Conference-Independent Schools conference. The school offers a wide range of athletics including:

- Baseball
- Basketball (Men's and Women's)
- Cheerleading
- Cross Country
- Football (1A state champions 1994)
- Soccer (Men's and Women's)
- Softball
- Track and Field (Men's and Women's)
- Volleyball
- Wrestling

== See also ==
- List of high schools in Indiana
