= New Prairie High School =

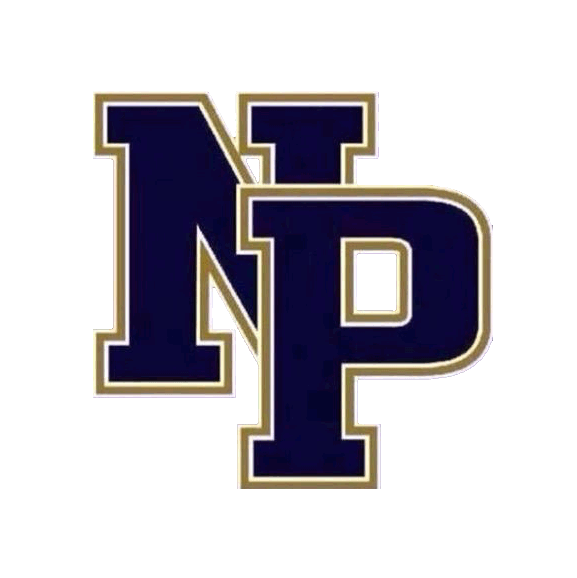

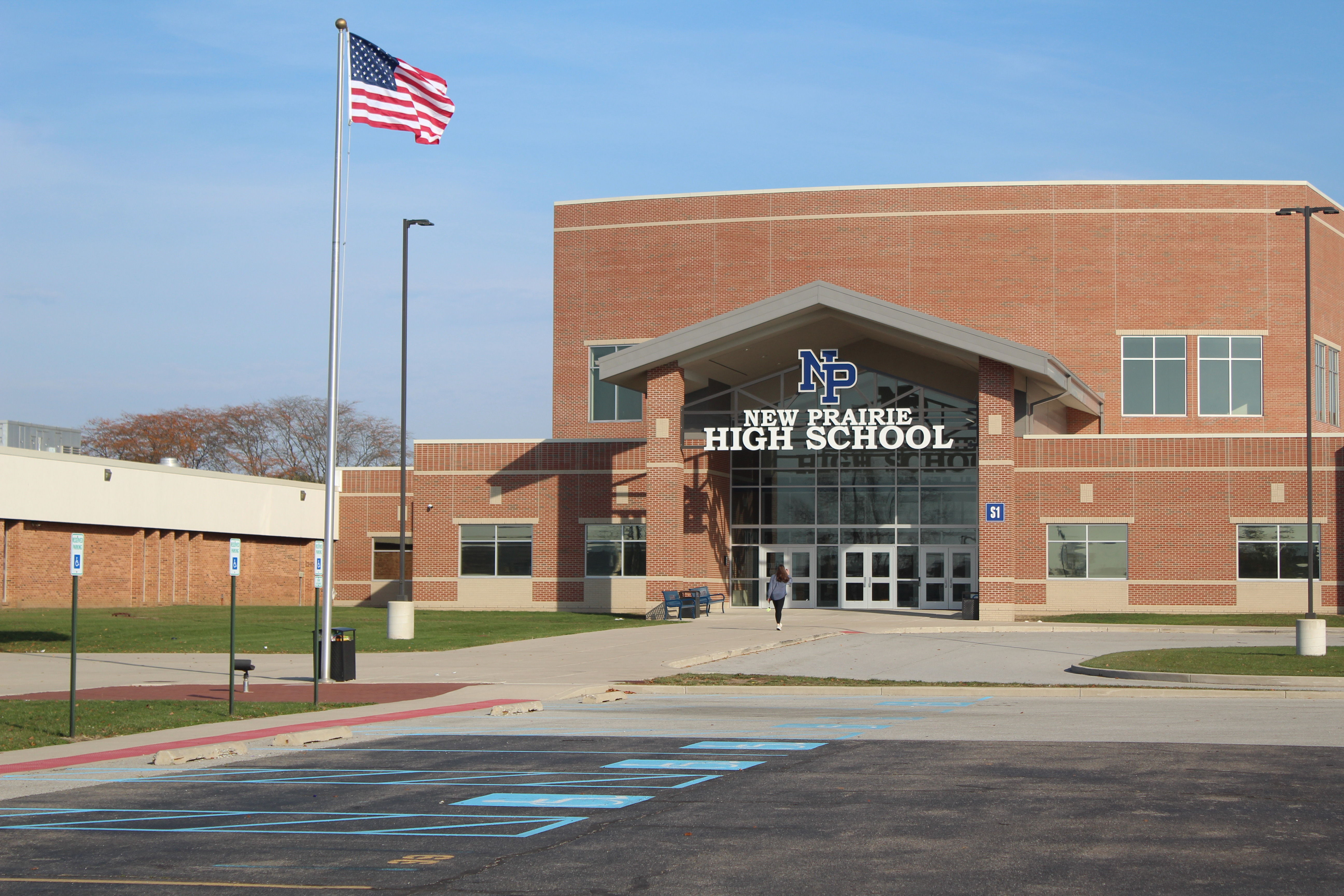
- New Prairie High School front entrance

Location
- 5333 North Cougar Road; New Carlisle, LaPorte County, Indiana 46552; United States
- 41.683933°N 86.562530°W

Information
- Type: Public high school
- School district: New Prairie United School Corporation
- Superintendent: Paul White
- Principal: Justin Heinold
- Teaching staff: 56.20 (FTE)
- Grades: 9-12
- Enrollment: 970 (2023–2024)
- Student to teacher ratio: 17.26
- Colors: Navy Blue, Gold, White
- Athletics conference: Northern Indiana Athletic Conference
- Team name: Cougars
- Rivals: LaPorte High School
- Website: Official Website

New Prairie High School is a public high school located in Wills Township, Indiana, operated by New Prairie United School Corporation.

== Athletics ==
New Prairie High School participates in the Northern Indiana Athletic Conference (NIC). The school's teams are known as the Cougars.

== See also ==
- List of high schools in Indiana
