= North Newton Junior-Senior High School =

Location
- 1641 West 250 North; Morocco, Newton County, Indiana 47963; United States
- 41.035272°N 87.424861°W

Information
- Type: Public high school
- School district: North Newton School Corporation
- Teaching staff: 35.33 (FTE)
- Grades: 7-12
- Enrollment: 499 (2023–2024)
- Student to teacher ratio: 14.12
- Color
- Athletics conference: Midwest Athletic Conference (IHSAA)
- Team name: The Spartans
- Rivals: South Newton
- Website: Official Website

North Newton Junior-Senior High School is a public high school located in Morocco, Indiana.

== See also ==
- List of high schools in Indiana
