= Winamac Community High School (Indiana) =

Location
- 715 School Drive; Winamac, Pulaski County, Indiana 46996; United States; 41.045871°N 86.596375°W

Information
- Type: Public high school
- School district: Eastern Pulaski Community School Corporation
- Superintendent: Chad Smekens
- Principal: Cody Hook
- Teaching staff: 26.00 (on an FTE basis)
- Grades: 9–12
- Enrollment: 360 (2023–2024)
- Student to teacher ratio: 13.85
- Color
- Athletics conference: Hoosier North Athletic Conference
- Team name: Warriors
- Newspaper: The Warrior Chronicles
- Website: Official Website

Winamac Community High School is a public high school located in Winamac, Indiana.

== Notable alumni ==
- Brad Crawford (1955–2023), College Football Hall of Fame inductee

== See also ==
- List of high schools in Indiana
