= Oregon-Davis Junior-Senior High School =

Location
- 5990 North 750 East; Hamlet, Starke County, Indiana 46532-9524; United States; 41°23′20″N 86°33′5″W

Information
- Type: Public high school
- Established: 1968
- School district: Oregon-Davis School Corporation
- Superintendent: William Bennett
- Principal: Emily White
- Teaching staff: 21.50 (FTE)
- Grades: 7-12
- Enrollment: 228 (2024-2025)
- Student to teacher ratio: 10.60
- Color
- Athletics conference: Independent
- Team name: Bobcats
- Website: School website

Oregon-Davis Junior-Senior High School is a public high school located in the town of Hamlet, Indiana and serves Oregon and Davis Township.

== History ==
Hamlet High School consolidated into Oregon-Davis High School in the 1960s. In 1971, Oregon-Davis (OD) opened a new school building; Grovertown High School consolidated into OD after the new school opened.

== Athletics ==
In the 2006–2007 season, Oregon-Davis won both the boys and girls class A state basketball titles.

The Oregon-Davis Jr./Sr. High School Bobcats are independent members of the Indiana High School Athletic Association. The school offers ten middle school, two junior varsity (JV), and twelve varsity (V) sports teams.

=== Middle school ===
- Baseball
- Basketball (boys' and girls')
- Cheerleading
- Cross Country
- Soccer
- Softball
- Swimming
- Track and field
- Volleyball

=== High school ===
- Baseball (V)
- Basketball (boys' JV; boys' and girls' V)
- Cheerleading (V)
- Cross Country (V)
- Golf (boys' and girls' V)
- Soccer (boy's V)
- Softball (V)
- Swimming (V)
- Track and field (V)
- Volleyball (JV/V)

== See also ==
- List of high schools in Indiana
