= South Newton High School =

Location
- 13102 South 50 East; Kentland, Newton County, Indiana 47951; United States
- 40.807906°N 87.384334°W

Information
- Type: Public high school
- Teaching staff: 20.50 (FTE)
- Grades: 9-12
- Enrollment: 241 (2023–2024)
- Student to teacher ratio: 11.76
- Color
- Athletics conference: Sangamon Valley Conference
- Team name: Rebels
- Website: www.southnewton.com/highschool

South Newton High School is a multi-community high school for grades 9–12 in rural Newton County, Indiana, United States. It is located between the incorporated towns of Kentland, Brook, and Goodland. The elementary and middle school facilities are adjacent to the high school.

== About ==
The school has more than 250 students and is classified as a 1A school by the IHSAA. The schools colors are red, gray and white. The mascot for South Newton is the Rebels.

== Athletics ==
The South Newton Rebels became the first Indiana high school to join an athletic conference located in Illinois. They started playing in the Sangamon Valley Conference in 2015 following the breakup of the Midwest Conference in Indiana. (Mount Carmel, Illinois, currently competes in a conference located in Indiana.)

== Notable alumni ==
- Tracy Smith (1984) – Head coach of the Arizona State Sun Devils baseball team. Former head coach of the Miami RedHawks baseball team and Indiana Hoosiers baseball team.
- Louis Sola (1986) – Commissioner of the U.S. Federal Maritime Commission.

== See also ==
- List of high schools in Indiana
