= Frontier Junior-Senior High School =

Location
- 1 Falcon Drive; Chalmers, White County, Indiana 47929; United States; 40.663948°N 86.862795°W

Information
- Type: Public high school
- School district: Frontier School Corporation
- Principal: Jeff Hettinger
- Faculty: 25.50 (FTE)
- Grades: 7-12
- Enrollment: 281 (2023-2024)
- Student to teacher ratio: 11.02
- Color
- Athletics conference: Midwest Conference
- Team name: Falcons
- Rivals: Tri-County, Twin Lakes, and North White
- Website: Official Website

Frontier Junior-Senior High School is a public high school located in Chalmers, Indiana.

== History ==
It was announced in 1997 that Frontier High School would add a wing to house middle school students and become Frontier Junior-Senior High School.

== Athletics ==
Frontier Junior-Senior High School's athletic teams are the Falcons and they compete in the Hoosier Heartland Conference. The school offers a wide range of athletics including:

- Baseball
- Basketball (Men's and Women's)
- Cross Country (Men's and Women's)
- Football
- Golf (Men's and Women's)
- Softball
- Track and Field (Men's and Women's)
- Volleyball
- Wrestling

== See also ==
- List of high schools in Indiana
