= North Judson-San Pierre Junior/Senior High School =

Location
- 1 Bluejay Drive; North Judson, Starke County, Indiana 46366; United States; 41.210378°N 86.788924°W

Information
- Former name: North Judson-San Pierre High School (1964-2016)
- Type: Public high school
- Established: 1964; 62 years ago
- Status: Operating
- School board: Cameron Stalbaum (president)
- School district: North Judson-San Pierre School Corporation
- NCES District ID: 1807800
- Superintendent: Dr. Kelly Shepherd
- CEEB code: 152625
- NCES School ID: 180780001330
- Principal: Brian Orkins
- Faculty: 35.50 (FTE)
- Grades: 7-12
- Gender: Co-educational
- Enrollment: 443 (2024-25)
  - Grade 9: 71
  - Grade 10: 75
  - Grade 11: 77
  - Grade 12: 72
- Student to teacher ratio: 12.48
- Campus type: Rural
- Color
- Athletics conference: Hoosier North Athletic Conference
- Mascot: Bluejay
- Team name: North Judson Bluejays/Ladyjays
- Rival: Knox Community High School
- USNWR ranking: 309 out of 404 (Indiana)
- National ranking: 12,924 out of 17,945
- Yearbook: The Pilot
- Communities served: North Judson; San Pierre
- Website: njsp.k12.in.us/jshs-home

North Judson-San Pierre Junior/Senior High School is a public high school located in North Judson, Indiana.

== History ==
North Judson-San Pierre (NJSP) High School was established in 1964 after San Pierre High School closed and merged with North Judson High School.

After this merge, construction began on what is now the current high school building. Construction began in 1972, and the building was dedicated in 1975. In 2006, the Athletic & Fine Arts Center opened.

Starting fall 2016, NJSP High School became NJSP Junior(Jr.)/Senior(Sr.) High School following the closure of the NJSP Middle School. After this merge, the high school went from grades 9 through 12 to grades 7 through 12.

== Athletics ==
North Judson-San Pierre Jr./Sr. High School Bluejays compete in the Hoosier North Athletic Conference. The school offers a wide range of athletics including middle school, junior varsity (JV), and varsity (V) sports teams.

=== Middle school ===
- Baseball
- Basketball (boys' and girls')
- Cheerleading
- Cross Country (co-ed)
- Football
- Softball
- Swimming (co-ed)
- Tennis
- Track and field (co-ed)
- Volleyball
- Wrestling

=== High school ===
- Baseball (JV/V)
- Basketball (boys' and girls'; JV/V)
- Cheerleading (V)
- Cross Country (boys' and girls'; V)
- Football (JV/V)
- Golf (boys' and girls'; V)
- Softball (JV/V)
- Swimming (boys' and girls'; V)
- Tennis (boys' and girls'; V)
- Track and field (boys' and girls'; V)
- Volleyball (JV/V)
- Wrestling (boys' and girls'; V)

== Arts and music ==
North Judson-San Pierre Jr./Sr. High School offers band and choir to grades 6 through 12. Sixth graders who opt into the band program get bussed to the Jr./Sr. building for one class period a day. NJSP currently has four concert bands: 6th Grade band, 7th Grade band, 8th Grade band and High School (9th through 12th) band. There are also three choirs: beginner, treble, and concert choir.

NJSP has two performances per year (one per semester). Each fall, choir students are exclusively able to audition for Madrigal, a Renaissance-era dinner show and chorale. Madrigal dinners typically occur the first weekend of December. Each spring, open auditions are held for a spring musical. Spring musical performances are typically one weekend in late March or early April.

== See also ==
- List of high schools in Indiana
