= Wheatfield, Indiana =

Town in Indiana, United States

- Town
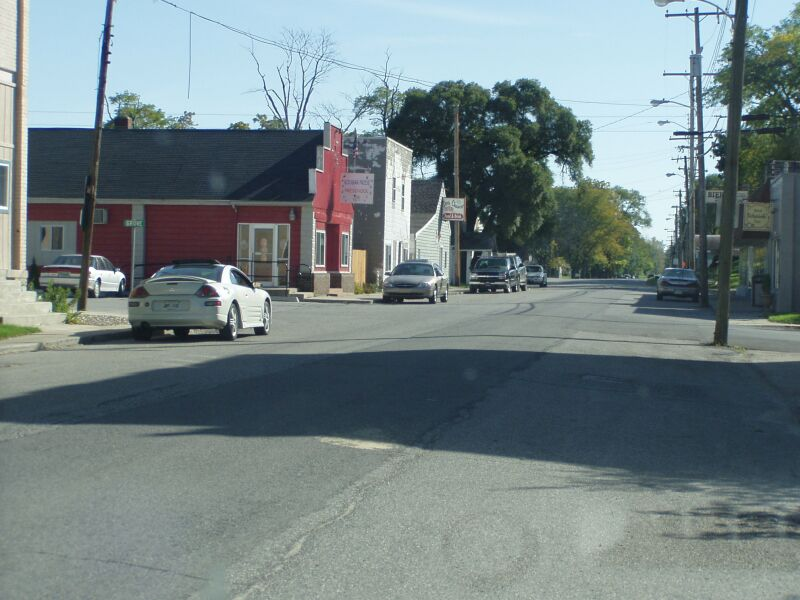
- Main Street in Wheatfield

- Location of Wheatfield in Jasper County, Indiana.
- Coordinates: 41°11′28″N 87°03′11″W
- Country: United States
- State: Indiana
- County: Jasper
- Township: Wheatfield

Area
  - Total: 0.59 sq mi (1.53 km^{2})
  - Land: 0.59 sq mi (1.53 km^{2})
  - Water: 0 sq mi (0.00 km^{2})
- Elevation: 666 ft (203 m)

Population (2020)
  - Total: 904
  - Density: 1,530/sq mi (590.8/km^{2})
- Time zone: UTC-6 (Central (CST))
  - Summer (DST): UTC-5 (CDT)
- ZIP code: 46392
- Area code: 219
- FIPS code: 18-83528
- GNIS feature ID: 2397738
- Website: townofwheatfield.com

Wheatfield is a town in Wheatfield Township, Jasper County, Indiana, United States. The population was 904 at the 2020 census.

== History ==
Wheatfield had its start in the early 1880s by the building of the railroad through that territory. The Wheatfield post office was established in 1882. Wheatfield was named for the field of swamp grass that looked like fields of wheat.

== Geography ==
According to the 2010 census, Wheatfield has a total area of 0.56 square miles (1.45 km^{2}), all land.

== Demographics ==
Historical population
| Census | Pop. | Note | %± |
|---|---|---|---|
| 1900 | 366 | | — |
| 1910 | 357 | | −2.5% |
| 1920 | 382 | | 7.0% |
| 1930 | 401 | | 5.0% |
| 1940 | 439 | | 9.5% |
| 1950 | 496 | | 13.0% |
| 1960 | 679 | | 36.9% |
| 1970 | 713 | | 5.0% |
| 1980 | 755 | | 5.9% |
| 1990 | 621 | | −17.7% |
| 2000 | 772 | | 24.3% |
| 2010 | 853 | | 10.5% |
| 2020 | 904 | | 6.0% |
U.S. Decennial Census

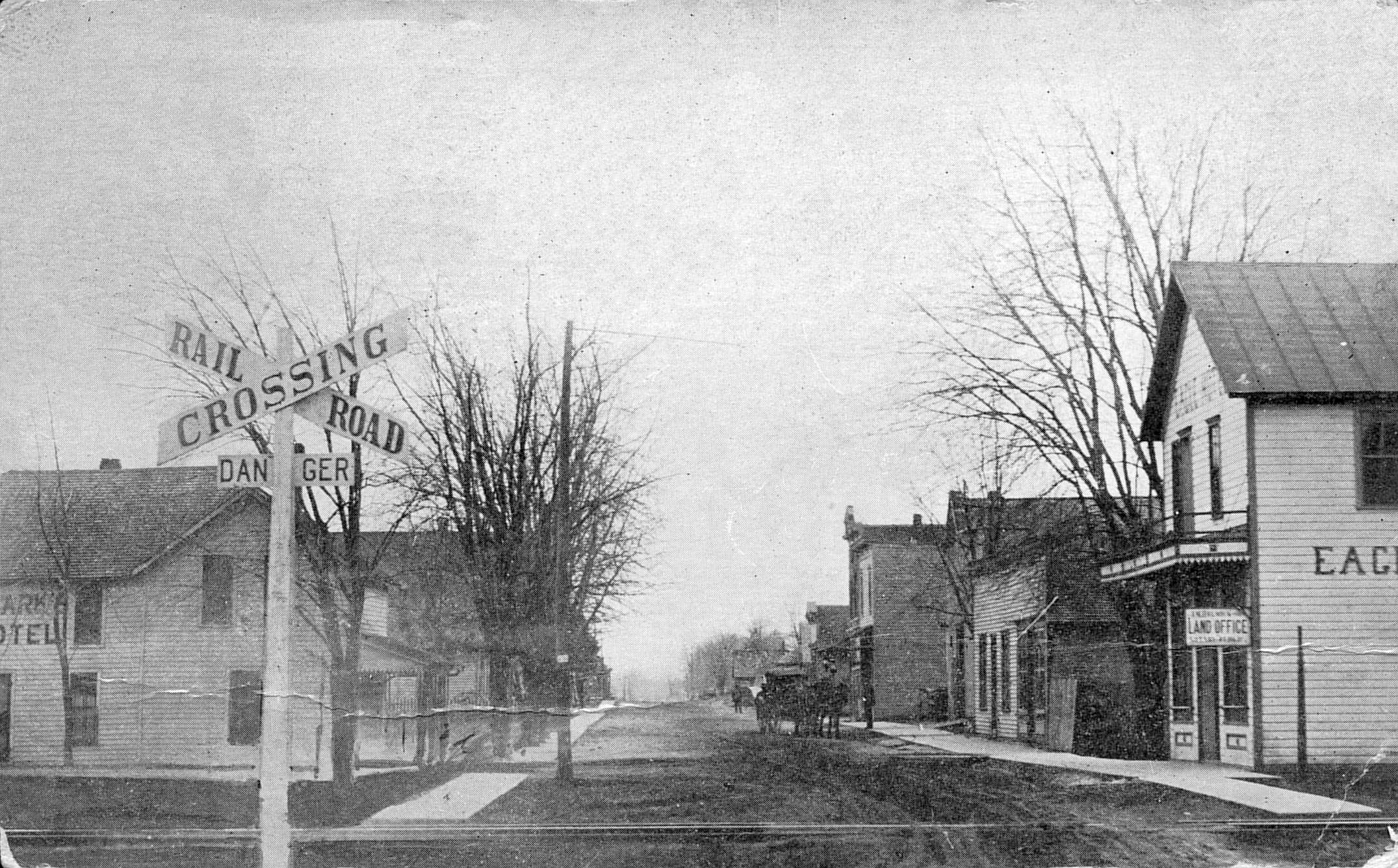
Wheatfield, 1915

=== 2010 census ===
As of the census of 2010, there were 853 people, 322 households, and 221 families living in the town. The population density was 1,523.2 inhabitants per square mile (588.1/km^{2}). There were 353 housing units at an average density of 630.4 per square mile (243.4/km^{2}). The racial makeup of the town was 95.8% White, 0.8% African American, 0.1% Asian, 0.2% Pacific Islander, 1.9% from other races, and 1.2% from two or more races. Hispanic or Latino of any race were 5.9% of the population.

There were 322 households, of which 39.4% had children under the age of 18 living with them, 48.1% were married couples living together, 13.4% had a female householder with no husband present, 7.1% had a male householder with no wife present, and 31.4% were non-families. 25.8% of all households were made up of individuals, and 9.9% had someone living alone who was 65 years of age or older. The average household size was 2.65 and the average family size was 3.20.

The median age in the town was 31.8 years. 29.1% of residents were under the age of 18; 8% were between the ages of 18 and 24; 29.3% were from 25 to 44; 22% were from 45 to 64; and 11.5% were 65 years of age or older. The gender makeup of the town was 49.4% male and 50.6% female.

=== 2000 census ===
As of the census of 2000, there were 772 people, 267 households, and 191 families living in the town. The population density was 1,398.4 inhabitants per square mile (539.9/km^{2}). There were 289 housing units at an average density of 523.5 per square mile (202.1/km^{2}). The racial makeup of the town was 94.17% White, 2.46% African American, 0.13% Asian, 0.78% from other races, and 2.46% from two or more races. Hispanic or Latino of any race were 2.46% of the population.

There were 267 households, out of which 36.0% had children under the age of 18 living with them, 54.7% were married couples living together, 9.7% had a female householder with no husband present, and 28.1% were non-families. 24.3% of all households were made up of individuals, and 8.2% had someone living alone who was 65 years of age or older. The average household size was 2.61 and the average family size was 3.07.

In the town, the population was spread out, with 33.2% under the age of 18, 9.5% from 18 to 24, 27.7% from 25 to 44, 18.5% from 45 to 64, and 11.1% who were 65 years of age or older. The median age was 29 years. For every 100 females, there were 108.6 males. For every 100 females age 18 and over, there were 101.6 males.

The median income for a household in the town was $38,021, and the median income for a family was $43,750. Males had a median income of $34,792 versus $23,472 for females. The per capita income for the town was $15,003. About 6.1% of families and 7.5% of the population were below the poverty line, including 7.5% of those under age 18 and 5.0% of those age 65 or over.

== Education ==
The Kankakee Valley School Corporation serves Wheatfield. Wheatfield Elementary School is located in and serves Wheatfield. Kankakee Valley Intermediate School, Kankakee Valley Middle School, and Kankakee Valley High School are located in Wheatfield Township and serve Wheatfield.

Wheatfield has a public library, a branch of the Jasper County Public Library.
