= Rensselaer Central High School =

Location
- 1106 East Grace Street; Rensselaer, Jasper County, Indiana 47978; United States; 40°56′3″N 87°8′11″W

Information
- Type: Public high school
- School district: Rensselaer Central Schools Corporation
- Superintendent: AJ Jones
- Principal: Ava Kosiba
- Teaching staff: 36.50 (FTE)
- Grades: 9-12
- Enrollment: 453 (2023-2024)
- Student to teacher ratio: 12.41
- Color
- Athletics conference: Hoosier Athletic Conference
- Nickname: Bombers
- Website: RCHS home page

Rensselaer Central High School is a high school located in Rensselaer, Jasper County, Indiana. The school is administered by the Rensselaer Central Schools Corporation.

== Athletics ==
Central is a member of the Hoosier Athletic Conference. The school's athletic teams compete as the Bombers. The following sports are offered at Central:

- Baseball (boys)
- Basketball (boys and girls)
- Cross country (boys and girls)
- Cheerleading (Girls)
- Football (boys)
  - State champ - 2014
- Golf (boys and girls)
- Soccer (boys and girls)
- Softball (girls)
- Swimming (boys and girls)
- Tennis (boys and girls)
- Track (boys and girls)
- Volleyball (girls)
- Wrestling (boys and girls)

== Notable alumni ==
- Philip H. Hayes, United States Congressman
- Elijah Gastineau, Maltese-American soccer player and environmental engineer

== See also ==
- List of high schools in Indiana
- Hoosier Athletic Conference
