= West Central High School (Indiana) =

Location
- 1852 South US 421; Francesville, Indiana 47946; United States
- Coordinates: 41.028455°N 86.890423°W

Information
- Type: Public
- Principal: Angie Radtke
- Grades: 9-12
- Enrollment: 212 (2023-24)
- Colors: Cardinal red, black, white
- Athletics conference: Midwest
- Team name: Trojans
- Website: hs.wcsc.k12.in.us

West Central High School is a public high school located near Francesville, Indiana, U.S.

== See also ==
- List of high schools in Indiana
