= Kankakee Valley High School =

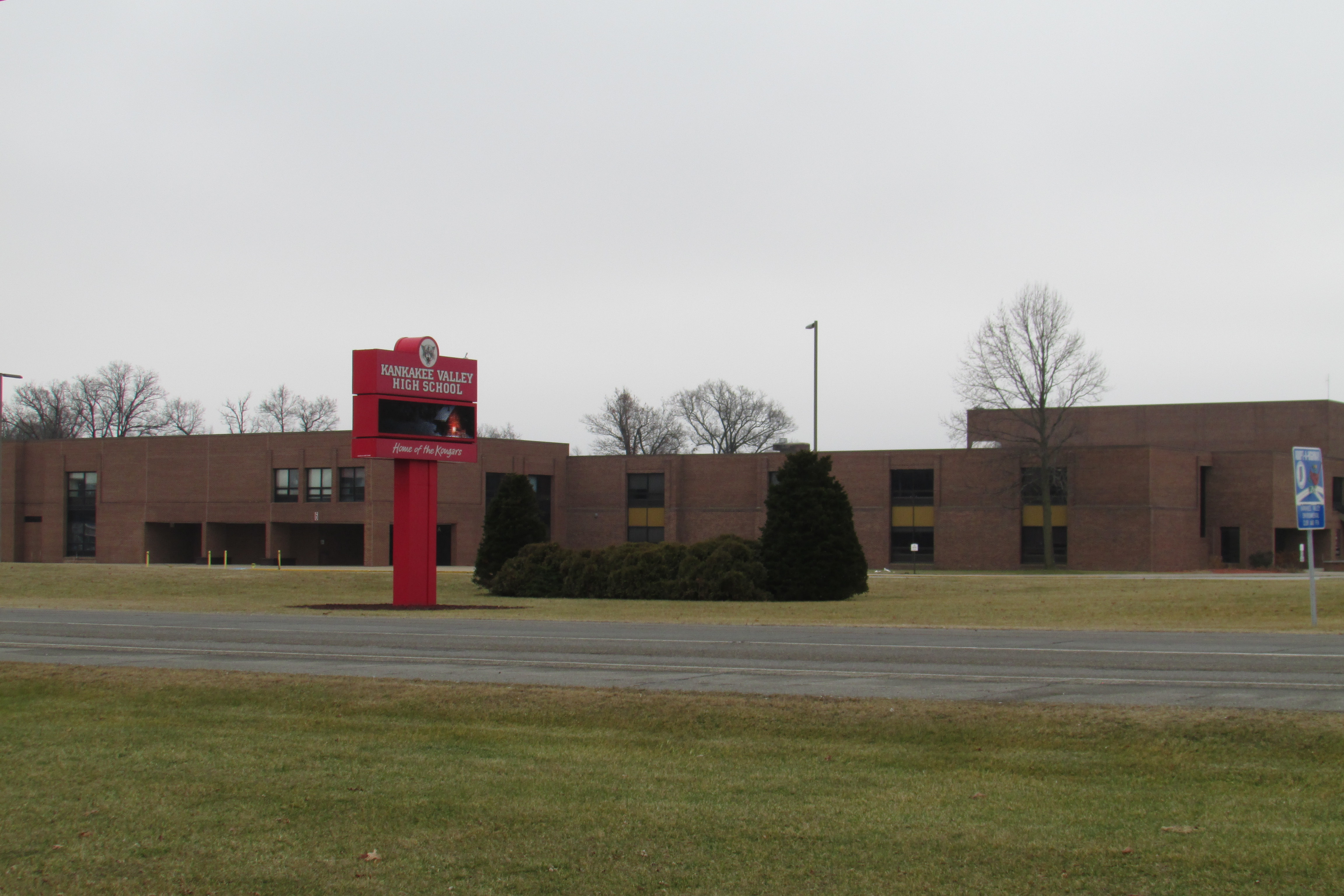

Location
- 3923 Indiana 10; Wheatfield, Indiana 46392; United States; 41°11′09″N 87°07′12″W

Information
- Type: Public High School
- Established: 1971
- School district: Kankakee Valley School Corporation
- Superintendent: Don Street
- Principal: Ryan Myers
- Teaching staff: 68.00 (on an FTE basis)
- Grades: 9-12
- Enrollment: 995 (2023-2024)
- Student to teacher ratio: 14.63
- Colors: Red, white and black
- Athletics conference: Northwest Crossroads
- Nickname: Kougars
- Website: kvhs.kv.k12.in.us
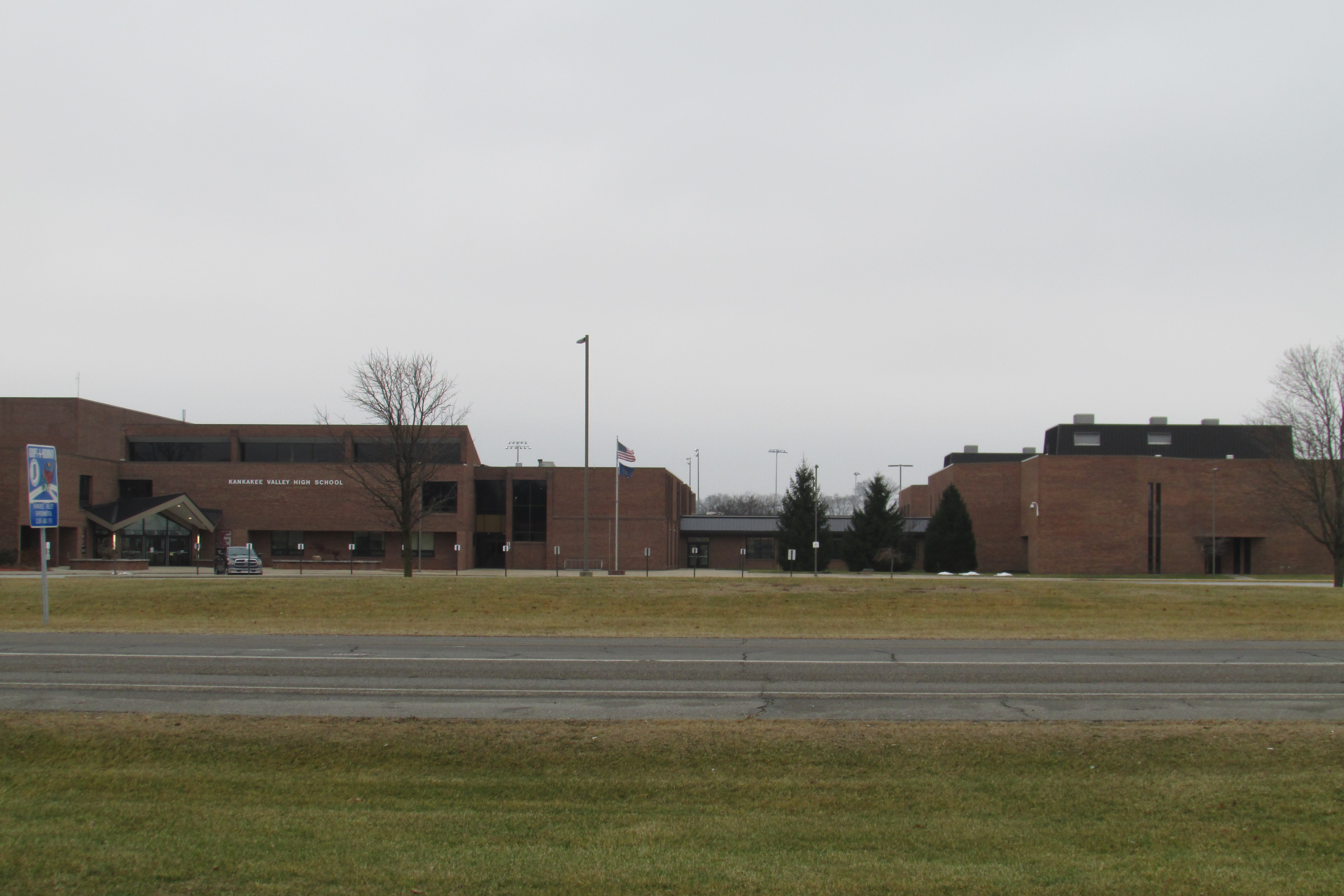

Kankakee Valley High School is a public secondary school serving grades 9–12 in Wheatfield Township, Indiana. It is the only high school in the Kankakee Valley School Corporation.

== About ==
Kankakee Valley High School is a part of the Kankakee Valley School Corporation and is located in northern Jasper County Indiana. The school was opened in 1971 as a merger between the DeMotte and Wheatfield High Schools in an effort to provide a higher quality of education to the area.

The school district (of which this is the sole comprehensive high school) includes Wheatfield, DeMotte, and the Jasper County portion of Roselawn. The school does not represent one single town or city, but rather incorporates students primarily from the surrounding communities of DeMotte and Wheatfield as well as a multitude of unincorporated communities such as Stoutsburg, Kniman, and Fair Oaks.

== Notable alumni ==
- Bryan Leturgez, Class of 1981 and three time Olympian and Bronze Medal winner in the 4-man bobsled. Leturgez played 5 sports with KVHS under 11 coaches. A prolific athlete, he was inducted into the KVHS Hall of Fame in the inaugural class of 2021.
- Cole Solomey, Class of 2023, and Indiana State Champion wrestler in his senior season. He finished his KVHS career with a 157-18 varsity record. He was ranked #1 in the state by IndianaMat.
- Celeste Susnis-Robinson, Class of 1990 and three time Indiana State title winner in Cross Country. She also won a National title.
- John VanSoest, Class of 1987 and 1987 Indiana Track state champion in the 1600 meter run, winning it with a time of 4:16.47.

== See also ==
- List of high schools in Indiana

== Sources ==
- District Website
- School Website
