= Indiana County Athletic Conferences =

American scholastic athletic conference

There were numerous conferences within the Indiana High School Athletic Association (IHSAA) that were made up of schools based entirely in one county. Many of these "County Conferences" also contained schools from neighboring counties that were either geographically closer or smaller than the other schools in their home county. These conferences would fold when schools would consolidate and seek out other, more expansive conferences that included similar-sized schools. The starting date of many of these conferences is hard to confirm, so the listing for many of these leagues uses the earliest date that can be confirmed.

== Adams County Conference ==
This conference predates the end of World War II, and most of its members shared membership with the Eastern Indiana Conference (EIC). The last non-EIC member closed in 1956, and this county league folded the next year.

School	Location	Mascot	Colors	Year joined	Previous conference	Year left	Conference joined
Berne^{1}	Berne	Bears		<1945	Independents	1957	Eastern Indiana (EIC)
Geneva^{1}	Geneva	Cardinals		<1945	Independents	1957	Eastern Indiana (EIC)
Hartford Township^{1}	Linn Grove	Gorillas		<1945	Independents	1957	Eastern Indiana (EIC)
Jefferson Township	Jay City	Warriors		<1945	Independents	1956	none (consolidated into Geneva)
Kirkland Township	Peterson	Kangaroos		<1945	Independents	1949	none (consolidated into Adams Central)
Monmouth^{1}	Monmouth	Eagles		<1945	Independents	1957	Eastern Indiana (EIC)
Monroe Township	Monroe	Bearkatz		<1945	Independents	1949	none (consolidated into Adams Central)
Pleasant Mills	Pleasant Mills	Spartans		<1945	Independents	1949	none (consolidated into Adams Central)
Adams Central^{2}	Monroe	Flying Jets		1949	none (new school)	1957	Eastern Indiana (EIC)

1. Concurrent in ACC and EIC from 1953 to 1957.
2. Concurrent in ACC and EIC from 1954 to 1957.

== Bartholomew County Conference ==
School	Location	Mascot	Colors	Year joined	Previous conference	Year left	Conference joined
Clifford	Clifford	Panthers		<1925		1928	Bartholomew- Shelby County
Hope	Hope	Red Devils		<1925		1928	Bartholomew- Shelby County
Newbern	Newbern	Knights		<1925		1928	none (consolidated into Columbus
Rock Creek Township	Burnsville	Bees		<1925		1928	none (consolidated into Columbus

== Bartholomew-Shelby County League ==
Originally the Shelby County League, the conference became a rare arrangement where all of the non-city schools from two counties played in the same conference in 1928, as Clifford and Hope became the only two schools remaining from the Bartholomew County Conference. Rather than just absorbing the two schools, the league rebranded under the BSCL moniker. Once Hauser left in 1961, the league took the old SCL name for three seasons, until the three remaining schools rejoined Hauser in the Mid-Hoosier Conference.

School	Location	Mascot	Colors	Year joined	Previous conference	Year left	Conference joined
Boggstown	Boggstown	Panthers		<1925		1958	none (consolidated into Triton Central)
Fairland	Fairland	Hornets		<1925		1958	none (consolidated into Triton Central)
Flat Rock	Flat Rock	Cardinals		<1925		1958	none (consolidated into Southwestern)
Moral Township	Brookfield	Hawks		<1925		1958	none (consolidated into Triton Central)
Morristown	Morristown	Yellow Jackets		<1925		1947	East Central
Mount Auburn	Mount Auburn	Rangers		<1925		1958	none (consolidated into Southwestern)
Waldron	Waldron	Mohawks		<1925		1964	Mid-Hoosier
Clifford	Clifford	Panthers		1928	Bartholomew; County	1957	none (consolidated into Hauser)
Hope	Hope	Red Devils		1928	Bartholomew; County	1957	none (consolidated into Hauser)
Hauser	Hope	Jets		1957	none (new school)	1961	Dixie
Southwestern (Shelbyville)	Shelbyville	Spartans		1958	none (new school)	1964	Mid-Hoosier
Triton Central	Fairland	Tigers		1958	none (new school)	1964	Mid-Hoosier

== Benton County Conference ==
The conference was founded in 1911, and stayed largely intact until the 1950s.

School	Location	Mascot	Colors	Year joined	Previous conference	Year left	Conference joined
Ambia	Ambia	Wildcats		1911		1955	Prairie
Boswell	Boswell	Blackhawks		1911		1955	Prairie
Earl Park	Earl Park	Cardinals		1911		1957	Western IN Small HS
Fowler	Fowler	Bulldogs		1911		1955	Midwest
Freeland Park	Freeland Park	Rockets		1911		1957	Western IN Small HS
Gilboa Township	Wadena	Wildcats		1911		1957	Western IN Small HS
Otterbein	Otterbein	Red Devils		1911		1955	Prairie
Oxford	Oxford	Blue Devils		1911		1955	Prairie
Pine Township	Fowler	Eagles		1911		1957	Western IN Small HS
Raub	Raub	Ramblers		1911		1957	Western IN Small HS
Wadena	Wadena	Indians		1911		1957	Western IN Small HS

== Blackford County Conference ==
A three school conference of schools from Blackford County, it ended

School	Location	Mascot	Colors	Year joined	Previous conference	Year left	Conference joined
Hartford City^{1}	Hartford City	Airedales		<1940	Independents	1953	Central Indiana
Montpelier	Montpelier	Pacers		<1940	Independents	1953	Eastern Indiana (Northern)
Roll	Roll	Red Rollers		<1940	Independents	1953	Eastern Indiana (Northern)

1. Played concurrently in BCC and CIAC 1945–53.

== Boone County Conference ==
The conference began in 1920, and folded in 1964, as only two schools remained.

School	Location	Mascot	Colors	Year joined	Previous conference	Year left	Conference joined
Advance	Advance	Osceoleons		1920		1948	none (consolidated into Jackson Township
Dover	Dover	Blue Devils		1920		1957	Big 4
Jamestown	Jamestown	Little Giants		1920		1948	none (consolidated into Jackson Township
Lebanon	Lebanon	Tigers		1920		<1951	Western Indiana
Perry Central	Herr	Midgets		1920		1963	none (consolidated into Lebanon
Pinnell	Pinnell	Purple Dragons		1920		1964	none (consolidated into Granville Wells)
Thorntown	Thorntown	Kewasakees		1920		1964	Independents (MCC 1966)
Washington Township	Mechanicsburg	Warriors		1920		1932	none (consolidated into Thorntown)
Whitestown	Whitestown	Panthers		1920		1964	none (consolidated into Lebanon
Zionsville	Zionsville	Eagles		1920		1964	Independents (RC 1972)
Jackson Township	Jamestown	Rockets		1948	none (new school)	1955	Big 4

== Brown County Conference ==
Another triangular conference within Brown County, all three schools consolidated into Brown County High School in 1961.

School	Location	Mascot	Colors	Year joined	Previous conference	Year left	Conference joined
Helmsburg	Helmsburg	Tigers		<1932	Independents	1961	none (consolidated into Brown County)
Nashville	Nashville	Yellow Jackets^{1}		<1932	Independents	1961	none (consolidated into Brown County)
Van Buren	Christiansburg	Bearcats		<1932	Independents	1961	none (consolidated into Brown County)

1. Changed name from Broncos in the 1930s.

== Carroll County Conference ==
School	Location	Mascot	Colors	Year joined	Previous conference	Year left	Conference joined
Adams Township	Lockport	Tigers		<1913		1961	White County
Bringhurst	Bringhurst	Badgers		<1913		1927	none (consolidated into Flora)
Burlington	Burlington	Polar Cubs		<1913		1961	none (consolidated into Carroll)
Burrows	Burrows	Bulldogs		<1913		1958	none (consolidated into Deer Creek)
Camden	Camden	Red Devils		<1913		1955	Midwest
Carrollton	Carrollton	Cardinals		<1913		1955	none (consolidated into Burlington)
Cutler	Cutler	Wildcats		<1913		1958	none (consolidated into Burlington)
Deer Creek	Harley	Crickets		<1913		1958	none (consolidated into Flora)
Delphi	Delphi	Oracles		<1913		1947	Hoosier
Flora	Flora	Badgers		<1913		1947	Hoosier
Rockfield	Rockfield	Dodgers		<1913		1951	none (consolidated into Camden)

== Cass County Conference ==
All schools were located in Cass County, Indiana. The conference formed in 1922 and folded in 1963.

School	Location	Mascot	Colors	Year joined	Previous conference	Year left	Conference joined
Deacon	Deacon	Demons		1922		1934	none (consolidated into Young America)
Galveston	Galveston	Cardinals		1922		1963	none (consolidated into Cass)
Lincoln	Lincoln	Railsplitters		1922		1933	none (consolidated into Galveston)
Logansport	Logansport	Berries		1922		1926	North Central
Lucerne	Lucerne	Lions		1922		1963	none (consolidated into Pioneer)
Metea	Metea	Hornets		1922		1961	none (consolidated into South Caston)
New Waverly	New Waverly	Wildcats		1922		1959	none (consolidated into Washington Township)
Onward	Onward	Red Coats		1922		1953	none (consolidated into Tipton Township)
Royal Center	Royal Center	Bulldogs		1922		1955	Midwest
Tipton Township^{1}	Walton	Warriors		1922		1963	none (consolidated into Cass)
Twelve Mile	Twelve Mile	Milers		1922		1961	none (consolidated into South Caston)
Washington Township	Anoka	Hatchets		1922		1963	none (consolidated into Cass)
Young America	Young America	Yanks		1922		1963	none (consolidated into Cass)
Noble Township	Verona	Knights		1930	none (new school)	1939	none (consolidated into Lucerne)
South Caston	Metea	Comets		1961	none (new school)	1963	Independents (consolidated into Caston 1964)

1. Was Walton before 1953.

== Clark County Conference ==
School	Location	Mascot	Colors	Year joined	Previous conference	Year left	Conference joined
Borden	Borden	Braves		<1945		1957	Southern Monon
Charlestown	Charlestown	Pirates		<1945		1958	Mid-Southern
Clarksville	Clarksville	Generals		<1945		1958	Mid-Southern
Henryville	Henryville	Hornets		<1945		1958	Southern Monon
New Washington	New Washington	Mustangs		<1945		1958	Southern Monon
Silver Creek	Sellersburg	Dragons		<1945		1958	Mid-Southern

== Clay County Conference ==
School	Location	Mascot	Colors	Year joined	Previous conference	Year left	Conference joined
Ashboro	Ashboro	Shamrocks		<1935		1959	none (consolidated into Clay City)
Bowling Green	Bowling Green	Pioneers		<1935		1964	none (consolidated into Clay City)
Brazil	Brazil	Red Devils		<1935		1944	West Central
Clay City	Clay City	Eels		<1935; 1940	White River; Valley	1936; 1964	White River; Valley; Tri-River
Coalmont	Coalmont	Cardinals		<1935		1963	none (consolidated into Shakamak)
Cory	Cory	Apple Boys		<1935		1964	Tri-County (Western)
Staunton	Staunton	Yellow Jackets		<1935		1964	Tri-River
Van Buren	Carbon	Blue Devils		<1935		1964	Tri-River

== Clinton County Conference ==
School	Location	Mascot	Colors	Year joined	Previous conference	Year left	Conference joined
Colfax	Colfax	Hickories		<1935		1961	none (consolidated into Clinton Prairie)
Forest	Forest	Bobcats		<1935		1959	none (consolidated into Clinton Central)
Jackson Township	Antioch	Cardinals		<1935		1961	none (consolidated into Clinton Prairie)
Kirklin	Kirklin	Travelers		<1935		1959	none (consolidated into Clinton Central)
Michigantown	Michigantown	Ganders		<1935		1959	none (consolidated into Clinton Central)
Mulberry	Mulberry	Berries		<1935		1961	none (consolidated into Clinton Prairie)
Rossville	Rossville	Hornets		<1935		1947	Hoosier
Scircleville	Scircleville	Ringers		<1935		1959	none (consolidated into Clinton Central)
Sugar Creek Township	Pickard	Crickets		<1935		1959	none (consolidated into Clinton Central)
Washington Township	Jefferson	Warriors		<1935		1961	none (consolidated into Clinton Prairie)

== Daviess County Conference ==
School	Location	Mascot	Colors	Year joined	Previous conference	Year left	Conference joined
Alfordsville	Alfordsville	Yellow Jackets		<1938		1965	none (consolidated into Barr-Reeve)
Barr-Reeve^{1}	Montgomery	Vikings		<1938; 1954	SW Indiana	1939; 1968	SW Indiana; Patoka Valley
Elnora	Elnora	Owls		<1938		1968	none (consolidated into North Daviess)
Epsom	Epsom	Salts		<1938		1968	none (consolidated into North Daviess)
Glendale	Glendale	Indians		<1938		1968	none (consolidated into Washington)
Odon	Odon	Bulldogs		<1938		1954	SW Indiana
Plainville	Plainville	Midgets		<1938; 1940	SW Indiana	1939; 1968	SW Indiana none (consolidated into North Daviess)
Raglesville	Raglesville	Rockets		<1938		1968	none (consolidated into North Daviess)

1. Was Barr Township before 1965.

== Dearborn County Conference ==
School	Location	Mascot	Colors	Year joined	Previous conference	Year left	Conference joined
Aurora	Aurora	Red Devils		192?		1930	Southeastern Indiana
Bright	Bright	Panthers		192?		1941	Laughery Valley
Dillsboro	Dillsboro	Bulldogs		192?		1941	Laughery Valley
Guilford	Guilford	Wildcats		192?		1941	Laughery Valley
Lawrenceburg	Lawrenceburg	Tigers		192?		1930	Southeastern Indiana
Moores Hill	Moores Hill	Bobcats		192?		1941	Laughery Valley

== Decatur County Conference ==
All schools were located in Decatur County. Conference folded in 1968 as all schools consolidated into either North Decatur or South Decatur high schools.

School	Location	Mascot	Colors	Year joined	Previous conference	Year left	Conference joined
Burney	Burney	Panthers		<1915		1968	none (consolidated into South Decatur)
Clarksburg	Clarksburg	Knights		<1915		1968	none (consolidated into North Decatur)
Jackson Township	Sardinia	Tigers		<1915		1968	none (consolidated into South Decatur)
New Point	New Point	Little Giants		<1915		1968	none (consolidated into North Decatur)
St. Paul	St. Paul	Blasters		<1915		1968	none (consolidated into North Decatur)
Sand Creek	Westport	Indians		<1915		1968	none (consolidated into South Decatur)
Sandusky	Sandusky	Blackhawks		<1915		1963	none (consolidated into Clarksburg)

== DeKalb County Conference ==
School	Location	Mascot	Colors	Year joined	Previous conference	Year left	Conference joined
Ashley^{1}	Ashley	Aces		<1925		1953	State Corner
Auburn	Auburn	Red Devils		<1925		1927	Northeastern Indiana
Butler^{1}	Butler	Windmills		<1925		1953	State Corner
Concord Township^{2}	St. Joe	Tigers		<1925		1953	none (consolidated into Riverdale)
Garrett	Garrett	Railroaders		<1925		1927	Northeastern Indiana
Orangeville	Orangeville	Orangemen		<1925		1943	none (consolidated into Concord Township)
Spencerville	Spencerville	Red Raiders		<1925		1953	none (consolidated into Riverdale)
Waterloo^{1}	Waterloo	Wildcats		<1925		1953	State Corner

1. Concurrent with DCC and SCC 1935–53.
2. Known as St. Joe before 1943.

== Delaware County Conference ==
All schools were located in Delaware County. The conference is one of the oldest confirmed, having competed since at least 1931, if not earlier. The conference folded in 1968 as the remaining five schools in the league consolidated into two.

School	Location	Mascot	Colors	Year joined	Previous conference	Year left	Conference joined
Albany^{1}	Albany	Wildcats		<1931		1968	none (consolidated into Delta)
Center	Center	Spartans		<1931		1968	none (consolidated into Wapahani)
Cowan	Muncie	Blackhawks		<1931		1963	Mid-Eastern
Daleville	Daleville	Broncos		<1931		1963	Mid-Eastern
DeSoto	DeSoto	Panthers		<1931		1968	none (consolidated into Delta)
Eaton	Eaton	Norsemen		<1931		1968	none (consolidated into Delta)
Gaston	Gaston	Bulldogs		<1931		1966	none (consolidated into Wes-Del)
Harrison Township	Bethel	Cardinals		<1931		1966	none (consolidated into Wes-Del)
Royerton	Royerton	Redbirds		<1931		1952	Mississinewa Valley
Selma	Selma	Bluebirds		<1931		1968	none (consolidated into Wapahani)
Yorktown	Yorktown	Tigers		<1931		1963	White River

1. Albany played concurrently in the DCC and the Eastern Indiana Conference 1953–68.

== Elkhart County Conference ==
Founded in 1922, the conference folded in 1969 as its four remaining schools were consolidated down to two.

School	Location	Mascot	Colors	Year joined	Previous conference	Year left	Conference joined
Bristol	Bristol	Pirates		1922	Independents	1966	none (consolidated into Elkhart}
Concord	Elkhart	Minutemen		1922	Independents	1967	Northern Lakes
Elkhart	Elkhart	Blue Blazers		1922	Independents	1927	Northern Indiana
Goshen	Goshen	Redskins		1922	Independents	1927	Northern Indiana
Jefferson Township	Goshen	Tigers		1932	Independents	1969	none (consolidated into Northridge)
Jimtown^{1}	Elkhart	Jimmies		1922; 1963	Independents; Northern State	1958; 1966	Northern State; Northern State
Middlebury	Middlebury	Middies		1922	Independents	1969	none (consolidated into Northridge)
Millersburg	Millersburg	Millers		1922	Independents	1967	none (consolidated into Fairfield)
Nappanee	Nappanee	Bulldogs		1922	Independents	1963	Northern Lakes
New Paris	New Paris	Cubs		1922	Independents	1967	none (consolidated into Fairfield)
Wakarusa	Wakarusa	Indians		1922	Independents	1969	none (consolidated into NorthWood)
Fairfield	Goshen	Falcons		1967	none (new school)	1969	Northern State

1. Was Baugo Township before 1961.

== Fayette County Conference ==
School	Location	Mascot	Colors	Year joined	Previous conference	Year left	Conference joined
Alquina^{1}	Alquina	Blue Arrows		192?		1958	Whitewater Valley
Bentonville	Bentonville	Trojans		192?		1953	none (consolidated into Harrisburg)
Everton	Everton	Bearcats		192?		1947	none (consolidated into Connersville)
Fairview	Fairview	Yellow Jackets		192?		1958	none (consolidated into Fayette Central)
Harrisburg^{1}	Harrisburg	Hornets		192?		1958	none (consolidated into Fayette Central)
Orange	Orange	Tigers		192?		1940	none (consolidated into Connersville)
Waterloo	Waterloo	Cardinals		192?		1958	none (consolidated into Connersville)

1. Played concurrently in FCC and WVC 1940–58.

== Fountain County Athletic Association ==
School	Location	Mascot	Colors	Year joined	Previous conference	Year left	Conference joined
Attica	Attica	Red Ramblers		1919		1932	Midwest
Covington^{1}	Covington	Trojans		1919		1965	Wabash River
Hillsboro	Hillsboro	Wildcats		1919		1965	none (consolidated into Fountain Central)
Kingman	Kingman	Wildcats		1919		1965	none (consolidated into Fountain Central)
Mellott	Mellott	Derbies		1919		1943	none (consolidated into Richland Township)
Newtown	Newtown	Knights		1919		1943	none (consolidated into Richland Township)
Veedersburg^{1, 2}	Veedersburg	Green Devils		1919		1965	none (consolidated into Fountain Central)
Wallace	Wallace	Peppers		1919		1964	none (consolidated into Hillsboro)
Richland Township	Newtown	Red Devils		1943	none (new school)	1965	none (consolidated into Fountain Central)

1. Played concurrently in the FCAA and WRC 1964–65.
2. Played concurrently in the FCAA and Midwest Conference 1932–47.

== Franklin County Conference ==
School	Location	Mascot	Colors	Year joined	Previous conference	Year left	Conference joined
Brookville^{1, 2}	Brookville	Greyhounds		192?		1941	Whitewater Valley
Laurel	Laurel	Panthers		192?		1941	Whitewater Valley
Springfield Township^{2}	Mount Carmel	Cardinals		192?		1941	Whitewater Valley
Whitewater Township	Rockdale	Elkhorns		192?		1941	Whitewater Valley

1. Played concurrently in FCC and Southeastern Indiana Conference 1930–40.
2. Played concurrently in FCC and WVC 1940–41.

== Fulton County Conference ==
School	Location	Mascot	Colors	County	Year joined	Previous conference	Year left	Conference joined
Akron	Akron	Flyers		25; Fulton	<1945		1963	Kosciusko
Beaver Dam	Beaver Dam	Beavers		43; Kosciusko	<1945		1962	none (consolidated into Akron)
Fulton	Fulton	Bulldogs		25; Fulton	<1945		1961	none (consolidated into North Caston)
Grass Creek	Grass Creek	Panthers		25; Fulton	<1945		1955	Tippecanoe Valley
Kewanna	Kewanna	Indians		25; Fulton	<1945		1955	Tippecanoe Valley
Leiters Ford	Leiters Ford	Tigers		25; Fulton	<1945		1951	none (consolidated into Aubbeenaubbee Township)
Richland Center	Richland Center	Wildcats		25; Fulton	<1945		1963	Tippecanoe Valley
Talma	Talma	Tigers		25; Fulton	<1945		1963	none (consolidated into Akron)
Aubbeenaubbee; Township	Leiters Ford	Braves		25; Fulton	1951	none (new school)	1955	Tippecanoe Valley
North Caston	Fulton	Comets		25; Fulton	1961	none (new school)	1963	Independents (consolidated into Caston 1964)

== Gibson County Conference ==
School	Location	Mascot	Colors	Year joined	Previous conference	Year left	Conference joined
Fort Branch^{1}	Fort Branch	Twigs		<1932		1949	Pocket
Francisco^{1}	Francisco	Owls		<1932		1949	Pocket
Haubstadt	Haubstadt	Elites		<1932		1965	Independents (closed 1974)
Hazelton	Hazelton	Lions		<1932		1963	none (consolidated into White River)
Mackey	Mackey	Aces		<1932		1965	none (consolidated into Wood Memorial)
Mount Olympus^{1}	Mount Olympus	Mountaineers		<1932		1949	Pocket
Oakland City^{1}	Oakland City	Acorns		<1932		1949	Pocket
Owensville^{2}	Owensville	Kickapoos		<1932		1949	Pocket
Patoka	Patoka	Wrens		<1932		1963	none (consolidated into White River)
Princeton	Princeton	Tigers		<1932		1936	Southern Indiana
White River	Patoka	Little Giants		1963	none (new school)	1965	none (consolidated into Princeton)

1. Concurrent with Pocket 1939–49.
2. Concurrent with Pocket 1938–49.

== Grant County Conference ==
School	Location	Mascot	Colors	Year joined	Previous conference	Year left	Conference joined
Fairmount^{1}	Fairmount	Quakers		192?		1965	Mid-Indiana
Gas City	Gas City	Tigers		192?		1948	none (consolidated into Mississinewa)
Jonesboro	Jonesboro	Zebras		192?		1948	none (consolidated into Mississinewa)
Marion^{2}	Marion	Giants		192?		1965	North Central
Mathews	Marion	Minutemen		192?		1945	none (consolidated into Jefferson Township)
St. Paul	Marion	Trojans		192?		1965	Independents (MLC 1973)
Swayzee^{3}	Swayzee	Speed Kings		192?		1957	none (consolidated into Oak Hill)
Sweetser^{3}	Sweetser	Braves		192?		1965	none (consolidated into Oak Hill)
Upland	Upland	Yeomen		192?		1945	none (consolidated into Jefferson Township)
Van Buren	Van Buren	Aces		192?		1965	none (consolidated into Eastbrook)
Jefferson Township	Upland	Yeomen		1945	none (new school)	1965	none (consolidated into Eastbrook)
Mississinewa^{1}	Gas City	Indians		1948	none (new school)	1965	Mississinewa Valley

1. Concurrently played in GCC and Mississinewa Valley Conference 1952–65.
2. Concurrently played in GCC and North Central Conference 1933–65.
3. Concurrently played in GCC and Tri-County Conference from 1955 until closing.

== Greene County Conference ==
School	Location	Mascot	Colors	Year joined	Previous conference	Year left	Conference joined
Bloomfield	Bloomfield	Cardinals		<1935		1936	White River Valley
Central^{1}	Switz City	Tigers^{2}		<1935; 1940	White River Valley	1936; 1956	White River Valley; SW Indiana
Jasonville	Jasonville	Yellow Jackets		<1935; 1940	White River Valley	1936; 1949	White River Valley; Western Indiana
Lyons	Lyons	Lions		<1935; 1940	White River Valley	1936; 1957	White River Valley none (consolidated into L & M)
Marco	Marco	Bears		<1935		1957	none (consolidated into L & M)
Midland	Midland	Middies		<1935; 1940	White River Valley	1936; 1961	White River Valley; Tri-County (Western)
Newberry	Newberry	River Rats		<1935		1947	none (consolidated into Central)
Owensburg	Owensburg	Indians		<1935		1961	none (consolidated into Eastern Greene)
Scotland	Bloomfield	Scotties		<1935		1955	none (consolidated into Bloomfield)
Solsberry	Solsberry	Hornets		<1935		1961	none (consolidated into Eastern Greene)
Worthington	Worthington	Ramblers		<1935		1956	SW Indiana
L & M	Marco	Braves		1957	none (new school)	1961	Tri-County (Western)

1. Was Switz City before 1947.
2. Team name was Switzers before 1947.

== Hamilton County Conference ==
Originally a 10-team conference located in Hamilton County (though Sheridan's attendance zone included a township in Boone County), consolidation and attendance disparities forced the remaining four schools to part ways. Noblesville became independent for some years, while the other three schools (including the newly formed Hamilton Heights, and Fishers, renamed as Hamilton Southeastern) left for the Mid-Capital.

School	Location	Mascot	Colors	Year joined	Previous conference	Year left	Conference joined
Arcadia	Arcadia	Dragons		<1930		1943	none (consolidated into Jackson Central)
Atlanta	Atlanta	Cardinals		<1930		1943	none (consolidated into Jackson Central)
Boxley	Boxley	Boxers		<1930		1932	none (consolidated into Sheridan)
Carmel^{1}	Carmel	Greyhounds		<1930		1958	Capital District
Cicero	Arcadia	Red Devils		<1930		1943	none (consolidated into Jackson Heights)
Fishers^{2}	Fishers	Tigers		<1930		1965	Mid-Capital
Noblesville	Noblesville	Millers		<1930; 1939	Central Indiana	1932; 1965	Central Indiana; Independents (SC 1967)
Sheridan^{3}	Sheridan	Blackhawks		<1930		1965	Mid-Capital
Walnut Grove	Walnut Grove	Wolves		<1930		1965	none (consolidated into Hamilton Heights)
Westfield	Westfield	Shamrocks		<1930		1965	Mid-Capital
Jackson Central^{4}	Arcadia	Eagles		1943	none (new school)	1965	none (consolidated into Hamilton Heights)

1. Carmel played in both the CDC and HCC from 1952 to 1958.
2. Fishers opened a new high school with a new mascot and colors, Hamilton Southeastern, in 1965. It is considered a renaming rather than a consolidation because no other high schools consolidated with Fishers.
3. Sheridan played in both the HCC and the Hoosier Conference 1948–65.
4. Jackson Central played in both the HCC and CDC 1961–65.

== Hancock County Conference ==
The Hancock County Conference is one of the few conferences that had an abundance of competitive members when it folded, as it was merged with the East Central Conference in 1962.

School	Location	Mascot	Colors	Year joined	Previous conference	Year left	Conference joined
Charlottesville	Charlottesville	Eagles		<1945		1962	East Central
Eden	Eden	Flyers		<1945		1955	none (consolidated into Hancock Central)
Fortville	Fortville	Demons		<1945		1959	none (consolidated into Vernon Township)
Greenfield	Greenfield	Tigers		<1945; 1948	East Central	1947; 1953	East Central; Capital District
Maxwell	Maxwell	Lions		<1945		1955	none (consolidated into Hancock Central)
McCordsville	McCordsville	Pirates		<1945		1959	none (consolidated into Vernon Township)
Mount Comfort	Mount Comfort	Buccaneers		<1945		1962	East Central
New Palestine	New Palestine	Dragons		<1945		1962	East Central
Westland	Westland	Bears		<1945		1947	none (consolidated into Charlottesville)
Wilkinson	Wilkinson	Bulldogs		<1945		1962	East Central
Hancock Central	Maxwell	Panthers		1955	none (new school)	1962	East Central
Vernon Township	Fortville	Vikings		1959	none (new school)	1962	East Central

== Harrison County Conference ==
Originally formed in 1914, this conference is notable for having two schools from a different county (Georgetown and Mount St. Francis Seminary in Floyd County) as members for its duration.

School	Location	Mascot	Colors	Year joined	Previous conference	Year left	Conference joined
Corydon Central^{1, 2}	Corydon	Panthers		1914		1958	Mid-Southern
Depauw	Depauw	Blue River Echoes		1914		1951	none (consolidated into North Central)
Elizabeth	Elizabeth	Pirates		1914		1959	none (consolidated into South Central)
Georgetown	Georgetown	Bearcats		1914		1962	Independents (consolidated into Floyd Central 1967)
Laconia	Laconia	Aces		1914		1959	none (consolidated into South Central)
Lanesville^{3}	Lanesville	Eagles		1914		1962	Blue River
Mauckport	Mauckport	Pilots		1914		1950	none (consolidated into Corydon Central)
Morgan Township^{3, 4}	Palmyra	Raiders		1914		1962	Blue River
Mount St. Francis Seminary	Mount St. Francis	Saints		1914		1962	Independents (closed 1975)
New Amsterdam	New Amsterdam	Rivermen		1914		1954	none (consolidated into Corydon Central)
New Middletown	New Middletown	Rangers		1914		1950	none (consolidated into Corydon Central)
North Central^{5}	New Salisbury	Tigers		1914		1962	Blue River
South Central (Elizabeth)^{3}	Elizabeth	Rebels		1959	none (new school)	1962	Blue River

1. Known as Corydon before 1950.
2. Played concurrently in the HCC and Southeastern Indiana Conference 1930–58.
3. Played concurrently in HCC and BRC 1959–62.
4. Known as Palmyra before 1925.
5. Known as New Salisbury before 1955.

== Hendricks County Conference ==
The conference was formed in 1914 , and ended in 1965 when the conference was reduced to three schools

School	Location	Mascot	Colors	Year joined	Previous conference	Year left	Conference joined
Amo	Amo	Aces		1914	Independents	1955	Little 8
Avon	Avon	Orioles		1914	Independents	1965	Mid-Capital
Brownsburg	Brownsburg	Bulldogs		1914	Independents	1942	Mid-State
Clayton	Clayton	Cardinals		1914	Independents	1955	Little 8
Danville	Danville	Warriors		1914	Independents	1942	Mid-State
Lizton	Lizton	Blue Blazers		1914	Independents	1965	none (consolidated into Pittsboro)
New Winchester	New Winchester	Warriors		1914	Independents	1955	Little 8
North Salem^{1}	North Salem	Blue Devils		1914	Independents	1965	Big 4
Pittsboro^{1}	Pittsboro	Burros		1914	Independents	1965	Big 4
Plainfield	Plainfield	Quakers		1914	Independents	1942	Mid-State
Stilesville	Stilesville	Tigers		1914	Independents	1955	Little 8

1. Concurrent with Big 4 Conference 1955–65.

== Henry County Conference ==
School	Location	Mascot	Colors	Year joined	Previous conference	Year left	Conference joined
Cadiz^{1}	Cadiz	Spaniards		<1942		1967	none (consolidated into Shenandoah)
Kennard	Kennard	Leopardcats		<1942		1957	none (consolidated into Knightstown)
Knightstown	Knightstown	Falcons		<1942		1947	East Central
Lewisville	Lewisville	Bears		<1942		1967	Whitewater Valley
Middletown	Middletown	Cossacks		<1942		1952	East Central
Mooreland^{1}	Mooreland	Bobcats		<1942		1964	none (consolidated into Blue River Valley)
Mt. Summit^{1}	Mt. Summit	Eagles		<1942		1964	none (consolidated into Blue River Valley)
New Lisbon	New Lisbon	Tigers		<1942		1957	none (consolidated into Straughn)
Spiceland	Spiceland	Stingers		<1942		1947	East Central
Straughn	Straughn	Indians		<1942		1966	Whitewater Valley
Sulphur Springs	Sulphur Springs	Blue Jays		<1942		1967	none (consolidated into Shenandoah)
Blue River; Valley^{2}	Mt. Summit	Vikings		1964	none (new school)	1967	Mid-Eastern

1. Concurrent with Mid-Eastern Conference from 1963 until closing.
2. Concurrent with MEC 1964–67.

== Howard County Conference ==
The Howard County Conference began in 1919, and was one of the first of the modern County Conferences to fold, as it was down to three schools by 1950 (Kokomo played in the North Central, and Taylor had not been created by that point). These schools joined with schools from Miami County to form the Howard-Miami Conference.

School	Location	Mascot	Colors	Year joined	Previous conference	Year left	Conference joined
Clay Township	Kokomo	Brickies		1919		1948	none (consolidated into Northwestern)
Ervin Township	Judson	Eagles		1919		1948	none (consolidated into Northwestern)
Greentown	Greentown	Beavers		1919		1950	none (consolidated into Eastern)
Howard Township	Cassville	Hornets		1919		1948	none (consolidated into Northwestern)
Jackson Township	Sycamore	Stonewalls		1919		1950	none (consolidated into Eastern)
Kokomo	Kokomo	Wildkats		1919		1926	North Central
New London	New London	Quakers		1919		1949	none (consolidated into Western)
Russiaville	Russiaville	Cossacks		1919		1949	none (consolidated into Western)
Union Township	Jerome	Cardinals		1919		1950	none (consolidated into Eastern)
West Middleton	West Middleton	Broncos		1919		1949	none (consolidated into Western)
Northwestern	Kokomo	Wildcats		1948	none (new school)	1950	Tri-County
Western	Russiaville	Panthers		1949	none (new school)	1950	Tri-County

== Huntington County Conference ==
The Huntington County Conference was formed in 1919 and ended in 1966, as all the public high schools in the county consolidated with Huntington to become Huntington North.

School	Location	Mascot	Colors	County	Year joined	Previous conference	Year left	Conference joined
Andrews	Andrews	Cardinals		35; Huntington	1919		1966	none (consolidated into Huntington North)
Banquo	Banquo	Ghosts		35; Huntington	1919		1955	none (consolidated into Andrews)
Bippus	Bippus	Tigers		35; Huntington	1919		1958	none (consolidated into Clear Creek)
Clear Creek	Clear Creek	Bulldogs		35; Huntington	1919		1966	none (consolidated into Huntington North)
Huntington	Huntington	Vikings		35; Huntington	1919		1927	NE Indiana
Huntington Catholic	Huntington	Ramblers		35; Huntington	1919		1966	independent (MLC 1971)
Huntington Township	Huntington	Bearcats		35; Huntington	1919		1966	none (consolidated into Huntington North)
Jefferson Township	Pleasant Plain	Spartans		35; Huntington	1919		1965	none (consolidated into Huntington)
Lancaster Center	Huntington	Lancers		35; Huntington	1919		1966	none (consolidated into Huntington North)
Markle	Markle	Eagles		35; Huntington	1919		1956	none (consolidated into Rock Creek)
Monument City	Monument City	Greyhounds		35; Huntington	1919		1953	none (consolidated into Lancaster Center)
Roanoke	Roanoke	Stonewalls		35; Huntington	1919		1966	none (consolidated into Huntington North)
Rock Creek	Plum Tree	Aces		35; Huntington	1919		1966	none (consolidated into Huntington North)
Union Township	Bowerstown	Sharpshooters		35; Huntington	1919		1966	none (consolidated into Huntington North)
Warren	Warren	Lightning Five		35; Huntington	1919		1966	none (consolidated into Huntington North)

== Jackson County Conference ==
The Jackson County Conference (originally Jackson County Athletic Association) was formed in 1921, containing all eleven schools in the county. The conference had fallen to three schools by 1965, and folded in 1967, as the only school that didn't hold membership in the Dixie-Monon Conference joined that league.

School	Location	Mascot	Colors	Year joined	Previous conference	Year left	Conference joined
Brownstown	Brownstown	Bears		1921	Independents	1930	Southeastern Indiana
Clear Spring	Clear Spring	Purple Warriors		1921	Independents	1967	Dixie-Monon
Cortland^{1}	Cortland	Eagles		1921	Independents	1965	none (consolidated into Seymour)
Crothersville^{2, 4}	Crothersville	Tigers		1921	Independents	1967	Dixie-Monon
Freetown	Freetown	Spartans		1921	Independents	1965	none (consolidated into Brownstown Central)
Houston	Houston	Pirates		1921	Independents	1939	none (consolidated into Freetown)
Medora ^{3, 4}	Medora	Hornets		1921	Independents	1967	Dixie-Monon
Pershing Township	Spraytown	Panthers		1921	Independents	1922	none (consolidated into Freetown)
Shields	Seymour	Owls		1921	Independents	1938	South Central
Tampico	Tampico	Bearcats		1921	Independents	1965	none (consolidated into Brownstown Central)
Vallonia	Vallonia	Redbirds		1921	Independents	1962	none (consolidated into Brownstown)

1. Played concurrently in the JCC and Dixie Athletic Conference 1962–65.
2. Played concurrently in the JCC and Dixie Athletic Conference 1961–65.
3. Played concurrently in the JCC and Southern Monon Conference 1959–65.
4. Played concurrently in the JCC and DMC 1965–67.

== Jasper County Conference ==
School	Location	Mascot	Colors	Year joined	Previous conference	Year left	Conference joined
DeMotte	DeMotte	Indians		<1930		1933	Kankakee Valley
Fair Oaks	Fair Oaks	Cherokees		<1930		1933	Kankakee Valley
Hanging Grove	Hanging Grove	Hornets		<1930		1933	Kankakee Valley
Remington	Remington	Rifles		<1930		1932	Midwest
Rensselaer	Rensselaer	Bombers		<1930		1932	Midwest
Tefft	Tefft	Tigers		<1930		1933	Kankakee Valley
Wheatfield	Wheatfield	Red Devils		<1930		1933	Kankakee Valley

== Jay County Conference ==
Jay County's schools were largely self-contained in this league, except for Portland. The league shrank to four members by 1967, and the conference folded into the Eastern Indiana Conference.

School	Location	Mascot	Colors	Year joined	Previous conference	Year left	Conference joined
Bryant^{1}	Bryant	Owls		<1945		1967	Eastern Indiana (EIC)
Dunkirk	Dunkirk	Speedcats		<1945		1967	Eastern Indiana (EIC)
Gray	Gray	Redbirds		<1945		1965	none (consolidated into Redkey)
Madison Township	Salamonia	Tomcats		<1945		1967	none (consolidated into Portland)
Pennville^{1}	Pennville	Bulldogs		<1945		1967	Eastern Indiana (EIC)
Poling	Poling	Yellowjackets		<1945		1963	none (consolidated into Portland)
Portland^{2}	Portland	Panthers		<1945		1954	Mississinewa Valley
Redkey^{1}	Redkey	Wolves		<1945		1967	Eastern Indiana (EIC)

1. Schools played in both EIC and JCC from 1953 until 1967.
2. Portland played concurrently in the JCC and MVC 1952–54.

== Jefferson County Conference ==
School	Location	Mascot	Colors	Year joined	Previous conference	Year left	Conference joined
Central (Madison)	Madison	Wildcats		192?		1952	Tri-County
Deputy	Deputy	Warriors		192?		1952	Tri-County
Dupont	Dupont	Hornets		192?		1952	Tri-County
Hanover	Hanover	Bulldogs		192?		1952	Ohio River Valley
North (Madison)	Madison	Tigers		192?		1952	Ohio River Valley
Saluda	Saluda	Bulldogs		192?		1952	Tri-County

== Johnson County Conference ==
One of the county leagues to extend past its geographic borders, Morgantown (from Morgan County played in the Conference throughout its existence.

School	Location	Mascot	Colors	Year joined	Previous conference	Year left	Conference joined
Center Grove	Bargersville	Trojans		1920	Independents	1956	Mid-State
Clark Township	Rocklane	Lions		1920	Independents	1965	none (consolidated into Whiteland)
Edinburgh^{1}	Edinburgh	Lancers^{2}		1920	Independents	1967	Mid-Hoosier
Greenwood	Greenwood	Woodmen		1920	Independents	1942	Mid-State
Hopewell	Hopewell	Tigers		1920	Independents	1965	none (consolidated into Franklin)
Masonic Home	Franklin	Craftsmen		1920	Independents	1945	none (school closed)
Morgantown^{3}	Morgantown	Trojans		1920	Morgan County	1967	none (consolidated into Indian Creek)
Neal	Franklin	Grizzly Cubs		1920	Independents	1936	South Central
Needham	Needham	Bulldogs		1920	Independents	1961	none (consolidated into Franklin)
Nineveh	Nineveh	Eagles^{4}		1920	Independents	1967	none (consolidated into Indian Creek)
Trafalgar	Trafalgar	Redbirds		1920	Independents	1967	none (consolidated into Indian Creek)
Union Township	Providence	Ramblers		1920	Independents	1965	none (consolidated into Franklin)
Whiteland	Whiteland	Warriors^{5}		1920	Independents	1965	Mid-Hoosier

1. Played concurrently in the JCC and MHC 1965–67.
2. Maroons before 1955.
3. Played concurrently in the JCC and MCC 1920–35, and the JCC and Tri-County (Central) 1935–39.
4. Bluebirds before 1958.
5. Wrens before 1939.

== Knox County Conference ==
One of the larger county leagues in southern Indiana, the league had eleven members until the creation of North Knox in 1963, and folded with the creation of South Knox in 1968.

School	Location	Mascot	Colors	Year joined	Previous conference	Year left	Conference joined
Bicknell	Bicknell	Bulldogs		<1932		1936	Southern Indiana
Bruceville	Bruceville	Hilltoppers		<1932		1963	none (consolidated into North Knox)
Decker	Decker	Aces		<1932		1968	none (consolidated into South Knox)
Decker Chapel	Decker	Panthers		<1932		1963	none (consolidated into Decker)
Edwardsport	Edwardsport	Powers		<1932		1962	none (consolidated into Vigo Township)
Freelandville	Freelandville	Dutchmen		<1932		1963	none (consolidated into North Knox)
Fritchton	Fritchton	Eagles		<1932		1968	none (consolidated into South Knox)
Monroe City	Monroe City	Blue Jeans		<1932		1968	none (consolidated into South Knox)
Oaktown	Oaktown	Oaks		<1932		1963	none (consolidated into North Knox)
Sandborn	Sandborn	Blue Jays		<1932		1962	none (consolidated into Vigo Township)
Westphalia	Westphalia	Wildcats		<1932		1962	none (consolidated into Vigo Township)
Wheatland	Wheatland	Jeeps		<1932		1968	none (consolidated into South Knox)
Vigo Township	Edwardsport	Warriors		1962	none (new school)	1963	none (consolidated into North Knox)

== Kosciusko County Conference ==
Kosciusko County's league was notable for the fact it had schools from two other counties, Fulton (Akron), and Whitley (Larwill and South Whitley). These schools would eventually consolidate with schools in the county to form new school districts.

School	Location	Mascot	Colors	Year joined	Previous conference	Year left	Conference joined
Atwood	Atwood	Greyhounds		<1945		1962	none (consolidated into Warsaw)
Burket	Burket	Hawks		<1945		1955	none (consolidated into Milford)
Claypool	Claypool	Knights		<1945		1966	none (consolidated into Warsaw)
Etna Township	Etna Green	Cubs		<1945		1963	none (consolidated into Triton)
Leesburg	Leesburg	Blue Blazers		<1945		1966	none (consolidated into Warsaw)
Mentone	Mentone	Bulldogs		<1945		1971	Independents (consolidated into Tippecanoe Valley 1974)
Milford	Milford	Trojans		<1945		1968	none (consolidated into Wawasee)
North Webster	North Webster	Trojans		<1945		1968	none (consolidated into Wawasee)
Pierceton	Pierceton	Cubs		<1945		1971	none (consolidated into Whitko)
Sidney	Sidney	Wildcats		<1945		1964	none (consolidated into South Whitley)
Silver Lake	Silver Lake	Ramblers		<1945		1966	none (consolidated into Warsaw)
Syracuse	Syracuse	Yellow Jackets		<1945		1968	none (consolidated into Wawasee)
Larwill	Larwill	Trojans		1958	Whitley County	1971	none (consolidated into Whitko)
South Whitley	South Whitley	Bulldogs		1958	Whitley County	1971	none (consolidated into Whitko)
Akron	Akron	Flyers		1963	Fulton County	1971	Independents (consolidated into Tippecanoe Valley 1974)

== LaGrange County Conference ==
School	Location	Mascot	Colors	Year joined	Previous conference	Year left	Conference joined
Brighton	Brighton	Wildcats		<1935		1964	none (consolidated into Lakeland)
Brushy Prairie	Brushy Prairie	Panthers		<1935		1964	none (consolidated into Prairie Heights)
Lagrange^{1}	Lagrange	Lions		<1935		1964	none (consolidated into Lakeland)
Lima	Lima	Orioles		<1935		1964	none (consolidated into Lakeland)
Scott	Scott	Bulldogs		<1935		1955	none (consolidated into Shipshewana-Scott)
Shipshewana-Scott^{2}	Shipshewana	Indians		<1935		1964	Bi-County
Springfield Township	Mongo	Dragons		<1935		1964	none (consolidated into Prairie Heights)
Topeka	Topeka	Bears		<1935		1964	Bi-County
Wolcottville^{3}	Wolcottville	Bulldogs		<1935		1964	none (consolidated into Lakeland)

1. Concurrent with the State Corner Conference from 1935 to 1941.
2. Was Shipshewana until 1955.
3. Concurrent with the State Corner Conference from 1941 until closing.

== Lawrence County Conference ==
One of the longer-lasting county conferences, despite the fact it had shrunk to three schools by 1963. Heltonville joined its sister schools on the Dixie-Monon Conference in 1970, folding the league, though all three and schools (as well as the DMC) were gone by 1974.

School	Location	Mascot	Colors	Year joined	Previous conference	Year left	Conference joined
Bedford	Bedford	Stonecutters		<1928	Independents	1942	Southern Indiana
Fayetteville^{1}	Fayetteville	Lions		<1928	Independents	1970	Dixie-Monon
Heltonville	Heltonville	Blue Jackets		<1928	Independents	1970	Dixie-Monon
Huron	Huron	Beavers		<1928	Independents	1963	none (consolidated into Mitchell)
Mitchell	Mitchell	Bluejackets		<1928	Independents	1950	Southeastern Indiana
Needmore	Needmore	Hilltoppers		<1928	Independents	<1948	Southwestern Indiana
Oolitic	Oolitic	Bearcats		<1928	Independents	1930	Southeastern Indiana
Shawswick	Shawswick	Farmers		<1928	Independents	<1948	Southwestern Indiana
Springville	Springville	Cardinals		<1928	Independents	1943	none (consolidated into Oolitic)
Tunnelton^{2}	Tunnelton	Indians		<1928	Independents	1970	Dixie-Monon
Williams^{3}	Williams	Bulldogs		<1928	Independents	1963	none (consolidated into Bedford)

1. Played concurrently in Southern Monon Conference and LCC 1959–65, and DMC and LCC 1965–70.
2. Played concurrently in Southern Monon Conference and LCC 1958–65, and DMC and LCC 1965–70.
3. Played concurrently in Southern Monon Conference and LCC 1959–63.

== Marion County Athletic Association ==
The first attempt by the township schools in Marion County to organize competition, the league organized a basketball tournament in the winter of 1928, then organized a season schedule in the 1928–29 school year. The league broke up in 1945, as all but three schools had found other conferences to join. The schools would all later reunite (minus Southport) in the Central Suburban Conference in 1971, though this would only last a few years. Today the Township schools are either in Conference Indiana or the Metropolitan Interscholastic Conference.

School	Location	Mascot	Colors	Year joined	Previous conference	Year left	Conference joined
Acton	Acton	Redbirds		1928	Independents	1939	none (consolidated into Franklin Township)
Ben Davis	Indianapolis	Giants		1928	Independents	1945	Independents (CSC 1971)
Castleton	Castleton	Comets		1928	Independents	1941	none (consolidated into Lawrence Central)
Lawrence	Lawrence	Lions		1928	Independents	1941	none (consolidated into Lawrence Central)
New Bethel	Wanamaker	Knights		1928	Independents	1939	none (consolidated into Franklin Township)
Oaklandon	Oaklandon	Oaks		1928	Independents	1941	none (consolidated into Lawrence Central)
Pike^{1}	New Augusta	Red Devils		1928	Independents	1945	Capital District
Southport	Southport	Cardinals		1928	Independents	1945	Independents (SCC 1951)
Valley Mills	Valley Mills	Comets		1928	Independents	1931	none (consolidated into Decatur Central)
Warren Central	Indianapolis	Warriors		1928	none (new school)	1945	Independents (CSC 1971)
West Newton	West Newton	Wildcats		1928	Independents	1931	none (consolidated into Decatur Central)
Decatur Central	West Newton	Hawks		1931	none (new school)	1942	Mid-State
Franklin Township	Acton	Flashes		1939	none (new school)	1945	Capital District
Lawrence Central	Lawrence	Bears		1941	none (new school)	1942	Mid-State

1. Was New Augusta until 1942.

== Marshall County Conference ==
School	Location	Mascot	Colors	Year joined	Previous conference	Year left	Conference joined
Argos	Argos	Dragons		<1932	Independents	1966	Independents (NLC 1998)
Bourbon	Bourbon	Comets		<1932	Independents	1963	none (consolidated into Triton)
Bremen^{1}	Bremen	Lions		<1932; 1962	Independents; Northern State	1958; 1966	Northern State; Northern Lakes
Culver	Culver	Indians		<1932	Independents	1966	Independents (TRC 1971)
LaPaz	LaPaz	Vikings		<1932	Independents	1965	none (consolidated into LaVille)
Plymouth	Plymouth	Pilgrims		<1932	Independents	1935	Central Indiana
Tippecanoe	Tippecanoe	Police Dogs		<1932	Independents	1963	none (consolidated into Triton)
Tyner	Tyner	Falcons		<1932	Independents	1966	none (consolidated into Glenn)
West Township	Donaldson	Bulldogs		<1932	Independents	1965	none (consolidated into Plymouth)
Triton	Bourbon	Trojans		1963	none (new school)	1966	Independents (TRC 1971)
LaVille	Lakeville	Lancers		1965	none (new school)	1966	Northern State

1. Played concurrently in MCC and NLC 1963–66.

== Martin County Conference ==
School	Location	Mascot	Colors	Year joined	Previous conference	Year left	Conference joined
Burns City	Burns City			<1935	Independents	1941	none (consolidated into Loogootee)
Loogootee^{1}	Loogootee	Lions		<1935	Independents	1943	Southwestern Indiana
St. John's	Loogootee	Eagles		<1935	Independents	1943	Independents (school closed 1969)
Shoals^{1}	Shoals	Jug Rox		<1935	Independents	1943	Southwestern Indiana
Trinity Springs	Trinity Springs	Little Sulphurs		<1935	Independents	1943	none (consolidated into Williams)^{2}

1. Concurrent with MCC and SWIAC 1939–43.
2. School consolidated into Williams, Lawrence County, attendance area was transferred to Shoals in 1963.

== Miami County Conference ==
School	Location	Mascot	Colors	Year joined	Previous conference	Year left	Conference joined
Amboy	Amboy	Pirates		<1918	Independents	1945	none (consolidated into Converse)
Bunker Hill	Bunker Hill	Minutemen		<1918	Independents	1950	Howard-Miami
Butler Township	Peoria	Tomahawks		<1918	Independents	1961	Independents (consolidated into Maconaquah 1963)
Chili	Chili	Polar Bears		<1918	Independents	1961	none (consolidated into North Miami)
Clay Township	Loree	Indians		<1918	Independents	1950	Howard-Miami
Converse	Converse	Bordermen		<1918	Independents	1950	Howard-Miami
Deedsville	Deedsville	Trojans		<1918	Independents	1961	none (consolidated into North Miami)
Denver	Denver	Demons		<1918	Independents	1920	none (consolidated into Mexico)
Gilead	Gilead	Wildcats		<1918	Independents	1961	none (consolidated into North Miami)
Macy	Macy	Yellow Jackets		<1918	Independents	1957	none (consolidated into Gilead)
Mexico	Mexico	Bulldogs		<1918	Independents	1961	none (consolidated into North Miami)
Peru	Peru	Tigers		<1918	Independents	1932	Central Indiana

== Monroe County Conference ==
School	Location	Mascot	Colors	Year joined	Previous conference	Year left	Conference joined
Ellettsville	Ellettsville	Golden Eagles		<1930	Independents	1935	Tri-County (Central)
Smithville	Smithville	Skibos		<1930	Independents	1935	Tri-County (Central)
Stinesville	Stinesville	Quarry Lads		<1930	Independents	1935	Tri-County (Central)
Unionville	Unionville	Arrows		<1930	Independents	1935	Tri-County (Central)
University	Bloomington	Univees		<1930	Independents	1935	Tri-County (Central)

== Montgomery County Conference ==
Often credited as the cradle of Indiana basketball, Montgomery County was home to three of the first four State Champions in the sport. When combined with neighboring Boone and Tippecanoe Counties, the area claimed the first eight winners. The conference lasted until 1966, when all schools folded into the Big 4 Conference.

School	Location	Mascot	Colors	Year joined	Previous conference	Year left	Conference joined
Alamo	Alamo	Warriors		<1935		1966	Big 4
Bowers	Bowers	Blackshirts		<1935		1955	none (consolidated into Darlington)
Darlington	Darlington	Indians		<1935		1966	Big 4
Ladoga	Ladoga	Canners		<1935		1955	Big 4
Linden	Linden	Bulldogs		<1935		1966	Big 4
New Market	New Market	Purple Flyers		<1935		1955	Big 4
New Richmond	New Richmond	Cardinals		<1935		1954	none (consolidated into Coal Creek Central)
New Ross	New Ross	Blue Jays		<1935		1966	Big 4
Waveland	Waveland	Hornets		<1935		1964	Big 4
Waynetown	Waynetown	Gladiators		<1935		1966	Big 4
Wingate	Wingate	Spartans		<1935		1954	none (consolidated into Coal Creek Central)
Coal Creek Central	New Richmond	Bearcats		1954	none (new school)	1964	Wabash River

== Morgan County Conference ==
School	Location	Mascot	Colors	Year joined	Previous conference	Year left	Conference joined
Eminence	Eminence	Eels		<1920	Independents	1935	Tri-County (Central)
Monrovia	Monrovia	Bulldogs		<1920	Independents	1935	Tri-County (Central)
Mooresville	Mooresville	Pioneers		<1920	Independents	1935	Independents (MSC 1942)
Morgantown^{1}	Morgantown	Trojans		<1920	Independents	1935	Tri-County (Central)
Paragon	Paragon	Panthers		<1920	Independents	1935	Tri-County (Central)

1. Played concurrently in the MCC and Johnson County Conference 1920–35.

== Newton County Conference ==
School	Location	Mascot	Colors	Year joined	Previous conference	Year left	Conference joined
Brook^{1}	Brook	Aces		<1930		1933	Kankakee Valley/Midwest
Goodland	Goodland	Trojans		<1930		1933	Kankakee Valley
Kentland^{1}	Kentland	Blue Devils		<1930		1933	Kankakee Valley/Midwest
Morocco^{1}	Morocco	Beavers		<1930		1933	Kankakee Valley/Midwest
Mount Ayr	Mount Ayr	Ayrdales		<1930		1933	Kankakee Valley

1. Played concurrently in NCC and MAC 1932–33.

== Noble County Conference ==
School	Location	Mascot	Colors	Year joined	Previous conference	Year left	Conference joined
Albion^{1}	Albion	Trojans		<1945		1966	Northeast Corner
Avilla^{2}	Avilla	Panthers		<1945		1966	none (consolidated into East Noble)
Cromwell	Cromwell	Spartans		<1945		1966	Northeast Corner
Ligonier	Ligonier	Red Raiders		<1945		1966	Northeast Corner
Rome City	Rome City	Romans		<1945		1966	none (consolidated into Kendallville)
Wawaka	Wawaka	Warriors		<1945		1966	Northeast Corner
Wolf Lake	Wolf Lake	Wolverines		<1945		1966	Northeast Corner

1. Concurrent with the State Corner Conference from 1935 to 1941.
2. Concurrent with the State Corner Conference from 1935 until closing.

== Orange County Conference ==
The conference ended in 1939, as all members joined either the Southeastern Indiana Conference or Southwestern Indiana Conference.

School	Location	Mascot	Colors	Year joined	Previous conference	Year left	Conference joined
French Lick^{1}	French Lick	Red Devils		<1922	Independents	1939	Southwestern Indiana
Orleans^{1}	Orleans	Bulldogs		<1922	Independents	1939	Southeastern Indiana
Paoli^{1}	Paoli	Rams		<1922	Independents	1939	Southeastern Indiana
West Baden	West Baden	Sprudels		<1922	Independents	1939	Southwestern Indiana

1. Played concurrently in the OCC and SEIC 1930–39.

== Owen County Conference ==
School	Location	Mascot	Colors	Year joined	Previous conference	Year left	Conference joined
Coal City	Coal City	Colts		<1927	Independents	1935	Tri-County (Central)
Freedom	Freedom	Aces		<1927	Independents	1935	Tri-County (Central)
Gosport	Gosport	Indians		<1927	Independents	1935	Tri-County (Central)
Patricksburg	Patricksburg	Bulldogs		<1927	Independents	1935	Tri-County (Central)
Quincy	Quincy	Aces		<1927	Independents	1935	Tri-County (Central)
Spencer	Spencer	Cops		<1927	Independents	1935	Tri-County (Central)

== Parke County Conference ==
School	Location	Mascot	Colors	Year joined	Previous conference	Year left	Conference joined
Bloomingdale	Bloomingdale	Bulldogs		<1945		1958	none (consolidated into Turkey Run)
Bridgeton	Bridgeton	Raccoons		<1945		1960	none (consolidated into Rosedale)
Greene Township	Parkeville	Green Aces		<1945		1958	none (consolidated into Turkey Run)
Marshall	Marshall	Bobcats		<1945		1958	none (consolidated into Turkey Run)
Mecca	Mecca	Arabs		<1945		1963	none (consolidated into Montezuma)
Montezuma	Montezuma	Aztecs		<1945		1964	Tri-River
Rockville	Rockville	Rox		<1945		1964	Wabash River
Rosedale	Rosedale	Hotshots		<1945		1964	Tri-River
Tangier	Tangier	Tigers		<1945		1958	none (consolidated into Turkey Run)
Union Township	Bellmore	Golden Eagles		<1945		1960	none (consolidated into Rockville)
Turkey Run	Marshall	Warriors		1958	none (new school)	1964	Wabash River

== Perry County Conference ==
Containing twelve schools at its beginning, the league was down to four schools by 1949. The conference managed to survive for another 13 years, until consolidation left it with two remaining schools, both with outside conference affiliation.

School	Location	Mascot	Colors	Year joined	Previous conference	Year left	Conference joined
Anderson Township	Ranger	Rangers		<1927	Independents	1930	none (consolidated into Bristow)
Bristow	Bristow	Purple Aces		<1927	Independents	1962	none (consolidated into Perry Central)
Cannelton^{1}	Cannelton	Bulldogs		<1927	Independents	1962	Pocket
Derby	Derby	Warriors		<1927	Independents	1936	none (consolidated into Union Township)
Leopold	Leopold	Leopards		<1927	Independents	1936	none (consolidated into Bristow)
Oil Township^{2}	Branchville	Oilers		<1927	Independents	1962	none (consolidated into Perry Central)
Oriole	Oriole	Orioles		<1927	Independents	1936	none (consolidated into Oil Township)
Rome	Rome	Romans		<1927	Independents	1935	none (consolidated into Union Township)
Tell City^{3}	Tell City	Marksmen		<1927	Independents	1949	Pocket
Tobinsport	Tobinsport	Pirates		<1927	Independents	1934	none (consolidated into Rome)
Troy	Troy	Trojans		<1927	Independents	1959	none (consolidated into Tell City)
Union Township	Dexter	Unionites		<1927	Independents	1938	none (consolidated into Oil Township)

1. Played concurrently in PCC and PAC 1938–62.
2. Played concurrently in BRC and PCC 1959–62.
3. Played concurrently in PCC and PAC 1938–49.

== Pike County Conference ==
The PCC was started in 1914, and was one of the later county conferences to fold, as the last of the four schools that had not joined the Patoka Valley Conference did so in 1964.

School	Location	Mascot	Colors	Year joined	Previous conference	Year left	Conference joined
Algiers	Algiers	Owls		1914	Independents	1926	none (consolidated into Otwell)
Otwell^{1}	Otwell	Millers		1914	Independents	1964	Patoka Valley
Petersburg^{2}	Petersburg	Indians		1914	Independents	1949	Pocket
Spurgeon^{1}	Spurgeon	Cardinals		1914	Independents	1964	Patoka Valley
Stendal^{1}	Stendal	Aces		1914	Independents	1964	Patoka Valley
Union	Petersburg	Eagles		1914	Independents	1937	none (consolidated intoPetersburg)
Velpen	Velpen	Leopards		1914	Independents	1937	none (consolidated into Otwell)
Winslow^{3}	Winslow	Eskimos		1914	Independents	1964	Patoka Valley

1. Concurrent with PCC and PVC 1959–64.
2. Concurrent with PCC and PAC 1938–49.
3. Concurrent with PCC and PAC 1939–40.

== Posey County Conference ==
School	Location	Mascot	Colors	Year joined	Previous conference	Year left	Conference joined
Cynthianna	Cynthianna	Annas		<1930	Independents	1958	none (consolidated into North Posey)
Griffin	Griffin	Tornadoes		<1930	Independents	1958	none (consolidated into North Posey)
Mount Vernon^{1}	Mount Vernon	Wildcats		<1930	Independents	1949	Pocket)
Poseyville^{2}	Poseyville	Posies		<1930	Independents	1958	none (consolidated into North Posey)
Stewartsville	Stewartsville	Owls		<1930	Independents	1944	none (consolidated into Poseyville)
Wadesville	Wadesville	Red Devils		<1930	Independents	1958	none (consolidated into North Posey)

1. Played concurrently in PAC and PCC 1938–49.
2. Played concurrently in PAC and PCC 1938–58.

== Putnam County Conference ==
School	Location	Mascot	Colors	Year joined	Previous conference	Year left	Conference joined
Bainbridge	Bainbridge	Pointers		<1919	Independents	1955	Big 4
Barnard	Barnard	Bears		<1919	Independents	1920	none (consolidated into Roachdale)
Belle Union	Belle Union	Panthers		<1919	Independents	1955	Big 4
Clinton Township	Morton	Yellow Jackets		<1919	Independents	1947	none (consolidated into Bainbridge)
Cloverdale	Cloverdale	Clovers		<1919	Independents	1955	Little 8
Fillmore	Fillmore	Cardinals		<1919	Independents	1955	Little 8
Greencastle	Greencastle	Tiger Cubs		<1919	Independents	1939	South Central
New Maysville	New Maysville	Knights		<1919	Independents	1925	none (consolidated into Roachdale)
Putnamville	Putnamville	Pirates		<1919	Independents	1940	none (consolidated into Reelsville)
Reelsville	Reelsville	Indians		<1919	Independents	1955	Little 8
Roachdale	Roachdale	Hawks		<1919	Independents	1955	Big 4
Russellville	Russellville	Bees		<1919	Independents	1955	Big 4

== Randolph County Conference ==
Formed in 1913, the conference was one of the largest county leagues, containing 18 schools at one point. The conference ended in 1964, as almost all the remaining schools joined (or were already part of) the Mid-Eastern Conference.

School	Location	Mascot	Colors	Year joined	Previous conference	Year left	Conference joined
Farmland	Farmland	Wildcats		1913; 1956	East Central	1947; 1964	East Central none (consolidated into Monroe Central)
Green Township	Fairview	Tigers		1913		1958	none (consolidated into Parker)
Huntsville	Huntsville	Redmen		1913		1963	none (consolidated into Union)
Jackson Township	New Pittsburg	Bulldogs		<1935		1958	none (consolidated into Ward-Jackson)
Jefferson	Deerfield	Red Devils		1913		1955	none (consolidated into Ward)
Lincoln	Maxville	Lions		1913		1950	none (consolidated into White River)
Losantville	Losantville	Red Devils		1913		1963	none (consolidated into Union)
Lynn	Lynn	Bulldogs		1913		1964	none (consolidated into Randolph Southern)
McKinley	Harrisville	Presidents		1913		1950	none (consolidated into White River)
Modoc	Modoc	Indians		1913		1963	none (consolidated into Union)
Parker	Parker City	Panthers		1913		1964	none (consolidated into Monroe Central)
Ridgeville	Ridgeville	Cossacks		1913		1964	Independents (consolidated into Winchester 1966)
Spartanburg	Spartanburg	Tomcats		1913		1964	none (consolidated into Randolph Southern)
Stoney Creek	Windsor	Blue Devils		1913		1958	none (consolidated into Farmland)
Wayne Township	South Salem	Tigers		1913		1957	none (consolidated into Union City)
Ward^{1}	Saratoga	Warriors		1913		1958	none (consolidated into Ward-Jackson)
West Side	Union City	Wildcats		1913		1947	East Central
Winchester	Winchester	Yellow Jackets		1913		1952	Mississinewa Valley
White River	Harrisville	Warriors		1950	none (new school)	1959	none (consolidated into Driver)
Ward-Jackson	Saratoga	Flyers		1958	none (new school)	1962	none (consolidated into Union City and Winchester)^{2}
Union^{3}	Modoc	Rockets		1963	none (new school)	1964	Mid-Eastern

1. Was Saratoga before 1955.
2. Ward Township residents went to school in Winchester after consolidation, while Jackson Township residents went to Union City.
3. Played concurrently in the RCC and Mid-Eastern Conference 1963–64.

== Ripley County Conference ==
School	Location	Mascot	Colors	Year joined	Previous conference	Year left	Conference joined
Batesville	Batesville	Bulldogs		192?		1930	Southeastern Indiana
Cross Plains	Cross Plains	Wildcats		192?		1941	Laughery Valley
Holton	Holton	Warhorses		192?		1941	Jennings-Ripley County
Milan	Milan	Indians		192?		1930	Southeastern Indiana
Napoleon	Napoleon	Bearcats		192?		1941	Jennings-Ripley County
New Marion	New Marion	Panthers		192?		1941	Jennings-Ripley County
Osgood	Osgood	Cowboys		192?		1930	Southeastern Indiana
Sunman	Sunman	Tigers		192?		1941	Laughery Valley
Versailles	Versailles	Lions		192?		1930	Southeastern Indiana

== Rush County Conference ==
School	Location	Mascot	Colors	Year joined	Previous conference	Year left	Conference joined
Arlington	Arlington	Purple Breezes		<1930		1968	none (consolidated into Rushville)
Carthage	Carthage	Blue Raiders		<1930		1956	East Central
Gings	Gings	Wildcats		<1930		1940	none (consolidated into Glenwood)
Glenwood	Glenwood	Indians		<1930		1968	none (consolidated into Rushville)
Manilla	Manilla	Owls		<1930		1968	none (consolidated into Rushville)
Mays	Mays	Tigers		<1930		1966	none (consolidated into Rushville)
Milroy	Milroy	Cardinals		<1930		1948	East Central
Morton Memorial	Knightstown	Lions		<1930		1948	East Central
Moscow	Moscow	River Rats		<1930		1968	none (consolidated into Rushville)
New Salem	New Salem	Eagles		<1930		1968	none (consolidated into Rushville)
Raleigh	Raleigh	Sir Walters		<1930		1968	none (consolidated into Rushville)

== Spencer County Conference ==
School	Location	Mascot	Colors	Year joined	Previous conference	Year left	Conference joined
Chrisney^{1}	Chrisney	Wildcats		<1930	Independents	1965	Patoka Valley
Dale^{2}	Dale	Golden Aces		<1930	Independents	1965	Pocket
Gentryville	Gentryville	Pirates		<1930	Independents	1938	none (consolidated into Dale)
Grandview	Grandview	Yellow Jackets		<1930	Independents	1943	none (consolidated into Luce Township)
Luce Township^{3}	Richland	Red Devils		<1930	Independents	1965	none (consolidated into South Spencer)
Rockport^{4}	Rockport	Zebras		<1930	Independents	1965	none (consolidated into South Spencer)

1. Played concurrently in SCC and PAC 1938–59, and SCC and PVC 1959–65.
2. Played concurrently in SCC and PAC 1939–65.
3. Was Richland City until 1943.
4. Played concurrently in SCC and PAC 1938–65.

== Starke County Conference ==
School	Location	Mascot	Colors	Year joined	Previous conference	Year left	Conference joined
Center Township	Brems	Blue Streaks		<1927		1942	none (consolidated into Knox)
Grovertown	Grovertown	Rams		<1927		1948	Independents (TVAC 1956)
Hamlet^{1}	Hamlet	Tigers		<1927		1948	Kankakee Valley
Knox	Knox	Redskins		<1927		1948	Independents (NSC 1954)
North Bend	Bass Lake	Knights		<1927		1929	none (consolidated into Culver)
North Judson	North Judson	Bluejays		<1927		1948	Independents (NSC 1954)
San Pierre^{1}	San Pierre	Bulldogs		<1927		1948	Kankakee Valley

1. Played concurrently in SCC and KVC 1935–48)

== Steuben County Conference ==
School	Location	Mascot	Colors	Year joined	Previous conference	Year left	Conference joined
Angola^{1}	Angola	Hornets		<1945		1959	Northeastern Indiana
Flint	Flint	Arrows		<1945		1959	none (consolidated into Orland)
Fremont^{2}	Fremont	Eagles		<1945		1964	Bi-County
Hamilton^{2}	Hamilton	Marines		<1945		1964	Bi-County
Metz	Metz	Mohawks		<1945		1957	none (consolidated into Angola)
Orland	Orland	Tigers		<1945		1964	none (consolidated into Prairie Heights)
Pleasant Lake	Pleasant Lake	Spartans		<1945		1958	none (consolidated into Angola)
Salem Center	Salem Center	Cardinals		<1945		1964	none (consolidated into Prairie Heights)
Scott Center	Scott Center	Bulldogs		<1945		1955	none (consolidated into Angola)

1. Concurrent with State Corner Conference from 1935 to 1941.
2. Concurrent with State Corner Conference from 1941 until 1964.

== Tippecanoe County Conference ==
School	Location	Mascot	Colors	Year joined	Previous conference	Year left	Conference joined
Battle Ground	Battle Ground	Tomahawks		<1945		1966	Mid-Central
Buck Creek	Buck Creek	Cobras		<1945		1958	none (consolidated into East Tipp)
Clarks Hill	Clarks Hill	Hillers		<1945		1955	none (consolidated into Lauramie Township)
Dayton	Dayton	Bulldogs		<1945		1966	none (consolidated into Wainwright)
Jackson Township	Odell	Spartans		<1945		1958	none (consolidated into Southwestern)
Klondike	West Lafayette	Nuggets		<1945		1961	Midwest
Monitor	Monitor	Commodores		<1945		1958	none (consolidated into East Tipp)
Montmorenci	Montmorenci	Tigers		<1945		1955	Prairie
Romney	Romney	Pirates		<1945		1958	none (consolidated into Southwestern)
Shadeland	Shadeland	Peppers		<1945		1958	none (consolidated into Southwestern)
Stockwell	Stockwell	Warriors		<1945		1955	none (consolidated into Lauramie Township)
Wea	North Crane	Indians		<1945		1958	none (consolidated into Southwestern)
West Point	West Point	Cadets		<1945		1958	none (consolidated into Southwestern)
Lauramie Township	Stockwell	Colts		1955	none (new school)	1966	none (consolidated into Wainwright)
East Tipp	Buck Creek	Trojans		1958	none (new school)	1966	Mid-Central

== Tipton County Conference ==
School	Location	Mascot	Colors	Year joined	Previous conference	Year left	Conference joined
Goldsmith	Goldsmith	Gold Bugs		<1930	Independents	1948	none (consolidated into Jefferson Township)
Kempton	Kempton	Pirates		<1930	Independents	1948	none (consolidated into Jefferson Township)
Prairie Township	Groomsville	Aces		<1930	Independents	1963	none (consolidated into Sharpsville-Prairie)
Sharpsville	Sharpsville	Bulldogs		<1930	Independents	1963	none (consolidated into Sharpsville-Prairie)
Tipton	Tipton	Blue Devils		<1930	Independents	1932	Central Indiana
Windfall	Windfall	Dragons		<1930; 1936	Independents; Central Indiana	1932; 1965	Central Indiana; Independents (consolidated into Tri-Central 1970)
Jefferson Township	Kempton	Yankees		1948	none (new school)	1965	none (consolidated into Tipton)
Sharpsville-Prairie	Sharpsville	Spartans		1963	none (new school)	1965	Mid-Capital

== Union County Conference ==
School	Location	Mascot	Colors	Year joined	Previous conference	Year left	Conference joined
Brownsville	Brownsville	Lions		192?		1940	Whitewater Valley
College Corner^{1}	College Corner	Trojans		192?	Preble County (OH)	1940	Preble County (OH)/ Whitewater Valley
Kitchel	Kitchel	Cowboys		192?		1940	Whitewater Valley
Liberty	Liberty	Lancers		192?		1940	Whitewater Valley

1. Played concurrently in UCC and PCC throughout duration in conference.

== Vermillion County Conference ==
While possibly having been organized earlier, the VCC was definitively established in 1923. The conference ended in 1964, as the three remaining schools combined to form North Vermillion High School.

School	Location	Mascot	Colors	Year joined	Previous conference	Year left	Conference joined
Blanford	Blanford	Bears		1923		1928	none (consolidated into Clinton)
Cayuga	Cayuga	Indians		<1925		1964	none (consolidated into North Vermillion)
Clinton	Clinton	Wildcats		1923		1944	West Central
Dana	Dana	Aggies		1923		1963	none (consolidated into Clinton)
Hillsdale	Hillsdale	Hilltoppers		1923		1961	none (consolidated into Clinton)
Newport	Newport	Tigers		1923		1964	none (consolidated into North Vermillion)
Perrysville	Perrysville	Eagles		1923		1964	none (consolidated into North Vermillion)
St. Bernice	St. Bernice	Hornets		1923		1961	none (consolidated into Clinton)

== Vigo County Conference ==
School	Location	Mascot	Colors	Year joined	Previous conference	Year left	Conference joined
Blackhawk	Blackhawk	Chieftains		<1924		1961	none (consolidated into Honey Creek)
Concannon	West Terre Haute	Cannons		<1924		1960	none (consolidated into West Vigo)
Fayette Township	New Goshen	Falcons		<1924		1960	none (consolidated into West Vigo)
Fontanet	Fontanet	Beantowners		<1924		1961	none (consolidated into Gerstmeyer Tech)
Garfield	Terre Haute	Purple Eagles		<1924		1944	West Central
Gerstmeyer Tech	Terre Haute	Black Cats		<1924		1944	West Central
Glenn	Seelyville	Pirates		<1924		1961	none (consolidated into Gerstmeyer Tech)
Honey Creek	Allendale	Honey Bees		<1924		1944	Western Indiana
Otter Creek	North Terre Haute	Otters		<1924		1961	none (consolidated into Garfield)
Pimento	Pimento	Peppers		<1924		1961	none (consolidated into Honey Creek)
Prairie Creek	Prairie Creek	Gophers		<1924		1961	none (consolidated into Honey Creek)
Prairieton	Prairieton	Panthers		<1924		1927	none (consolidated into Prairie Creek)
Riley	Riley	Cossacks		<1924		1961	none (consolidated into Wiley)
State Lab	Terre Haute	Little Sycamores		<1924		1944	West Central
West Terre Haute	West Terre Haute	Cannons		<1924		1960	none (consolidated into West Vigo)
Wiley	Terre Haute	Red Streaks		<1924		1944	West Central
Rankin	Terre Haute	Raiders		1936	none (new school)	1938	none (consolidated into Garfield)
Thornton	Terre Haute	Thorns		1936	none (new school)	1939	none (consolidated into Gerstmeyer Tech)

== Wabash County Conference ==
School	Location	Mascot	Colors	Year joined	Previous conference	Year left	Conference joined
Chester Township	Bolivar	Panthers		<1930		1957	none (consolidated into Manchester)
Chippewa	Chippewa	Knights		<1930		1952	none (consolidated into Linlawn)
LaFontaine	LaFontaine	Cossacks		<1930		1962	none (consolidated into Southwood)
Lagro	Lagro	Comets		<1930		1962	none (consolidated into Northfield)
Laketon	Laketon	Tigers		<1930		1962	none (consolidated into Manchester)
Lincolnville	Lincolnville	Gold Bugs		<1930		1962	none (consolidated into Lagro)
Manchester Central	North Manchester	Trojans		<1930		1957	none (consolidated into Manchester)
Noble Township^{1}	Linlawn	Pirates		<1930		1962	none (consolidated into Southwood)
Roann	Roann	Indians		<1930		1962	none (consolidated into Northfield)
Somerset	Somerset	Shamrocks		<1930		1962	none (consolidated into Southwood)
Urbana	Urbana	Speed Kings		<1930		1962	none (consolidated into Northfield)
Manchester	North; Manchester	Squires		1957	none (new school)	1962	Independents (NLC 1963)

1. Was Linlawn before 1953.

== Warren County Conference ==
A small, triangular conference (with only three schools in the county) for most of its existence, the conference existed in two versions with the same schools (opting not to compete from 1934 to 1947, as all members were within the Midwest Conference). While Seeger started as a renaming of West Lebanon in 1959 rather than a consolidation, it is given its own entry, since its nickname and colors were different as well.

School	Location	Mascot	Colors	Year joined	Previous conference	Year left	Conference joined
Judyville	Judyville	Patriots		<1925	Independents	1929	none (consolidated into Williamsport)
Pine Village^{1}	Pine Village	Pine Knots		<1925; 1947	Independents; Midwest	1934; 1973	Midwest none (consolidated into Seeger)
West Lebanon	West Lebanon	Clippers		<1925; 1947	Independents; Midwest	1934; 1959	Midwest none (changed name to Seeger)
Williamsport^{1}	Williamsport	Binngy Bombers		<1925; 1947	Independents; Midwest	1934; 1973	Midwest none (consolidated into Seeger)
Seeger^{2}	West Lebanon	Patriots		1959	none (changed name from West Lebanon)	1973	Wabash River

1. Concurrent with MWC 1932–34.
2. Concurrent with WRC 1964–73.

== Warrick County Conference ==
School	Location	Mascot	Colors	Year joined	Previous conference	Year left	Conference joined
Boonville	Boonville^{1}	Pioneers		<1935	Independents	1941	Southern Indiana
Chandler	Chandler	Panthers		<1935	Independents	1959	none (consolidated into Castle)
Elberfield	Elberfield	Hornets		<1935	Independents	1965	none (consolidated into Tecumseh)
Folsomville	Folsomville	Eagles		<1935	Independents	1956	none (consolidated into Boonville)
Lynnville^{2}	Lynnville	Lyndis		<1935	Independents	1965	none (consolidated into Tecumseh)
Millersburg	Millersburg	Wildcats		<1935	Independents	1965	none (consolidated into Castle)
Newburgh	Newburgh	Wildcats		<1935	Independents	1959	none (consolidated into Castle)
Selvin	Selvin	Wildcats		<1935	Independents	1962	none (consolidated into Lynnville)
Tennyson	Tennyson	Tigers		<1935	Independents	1963	none (consolidated into Boonville)
Yankeetown	Yankeetown	Yanks		<1935	Independents	1935	none (consolidated into Boonville)

1. Played concurrently in WCC and PAC 1939–41.
2. Played concurrently in WCC and PAC 1938–59, and WCC and PVC 1959–65.1

== Washington County Conference ==
School	Location	Mascot	Colors	Year joined	Previous conference	Year left	Conference joined
Campbellsburg^{1}	Campbellsburg	Warriors		<1925	Independents	1958	Southern Monon
Hardinsburg	Hardinsburg	Bearcats		<1925	Independents	1958	Southern Monon
Little York	Little York	Wildcats		<1925	Independents	1947	none (consolidated into Salem)
Monroe Township	Kossuth	Mustangs		<1925	Independents	1939	none (consolidated into Salem)
Pekin	Pekin	Musketeers		<1925	Independents	1958	Southern Monon
Salem	Salem	Lions		<1925	Independents	1930	Southeastern Indiana

== Wayne County Conference ==
School	Location	Mascot	Colors	Year joined	Previous conference	Year left	Conference joined
Boston	Boston	Terriers		<1941		1963	none (consolidated into Richmond)
Cambridge City	Cambridge City	Wampus Cats		<1941		1947	East Central
Centerville	Centerville	Bulldogs		<1941		1947	East Central
Economy	Economy	Cardinals		1930s		1962	none (consolidated into Hagerstown)
Fountain City	Fountain City	Little Giants		<1941		1964	Whitewater Valley (as Whitewater-Fountain City)
Greensfork	Greensfork	Black Demons		1930s		1962	none (consolidated into Hagerstown)
Hagerstown	Hagerstown	Tigers		<1941		1947	East Central
Milton	Milton	Sharpshooters		<1941		1962	Whitewater Valley
Webster	Webster	Pirates		<1941		1964	Whitewater Valley (as Webster-Williamsburg)
Whitewater	Whitewater	Bears		<1941		1964	none (consolidated into Whitewater-Fountain City)
Williamsburg	Williamsburg	Yellow Jackets		<1941; 1948	East Central	1948; 1964	East Central none (consolidated into Webster-Williamsburg)

== Wells County Conference ==
The Wells County Conference dated back to at least 1904, and lasted until 1966, when only one school remained open.

School	Location	Mascot	Colors	Year joined	Previous conference	Year left	Conference joined
Bluffton	Bluffton	Tigers		<1904		1927	Northeastern Indiana
Chester Center	Keystone	Indians		<1904		1966	none (consolidated into Southern Wells)
Jackson Center	Mount Zion	Jaguars		<1904		1966	none (consolidated into Southern Wells)
Lancaster Central^{1}	Ossian	Bobcats		<1904		1966	Eastern Indiana (EIC)
Liberty Center	Liberty Center	Lions		<1904		1966	none (consolidated into Southern Wells)
Ossian	Ossian	Bears		<1904		1959	Eastern Wabash Valley
Petroleum	Petroleum	Panthers		<1904		1966	none (consolidated into Southern Wells)
Rockcreek Center	Rockford	Dodgers		<1904		1964	none (consolidated into Ossian)
Union Center	Uniondale	Badgers		<1904		1962	none (consolidated into Ossian)

1. Lancaster Central played concurrently in the EIC and WCC from 1954 to 1959, then in the EWVC and WCC until both folded in 1966.

== White County Conference ==
One of the oldest confirmed county conferences, the alliance dates back to at least 1908.

School	Location	Mascot	Colors	Year joined	Previous conference	Year left	Conference joined
Brookston	Brookston	Bombers		<1908	Independents	1955	Midwest
Buffalo	Buffalo	Bison		<1908	Independents	1963	none (consolidated into North White)
Burnettsville	Burnettsville	Bees		<1908	Independents	1963	none (consolidated into Twin Lakes)
Chalmers	Chalmers	Cardinals		<1908	Independents	1957	Western IN Small HS
Idaville	Idaville	Green Streaks		<1908	Independents	1963	none (consolidated into Twin Lakes)
Monon	Monon	Railroaders		<1908	Independents	1933	Kankakee Valley
Monticello	Monticello	Tioga Indians		<1908	Independents	1932	Midwest
Reynolds	Reynolds	Rangers		<1908	Independents	1963	none (consolidated into North White)
Round Grove	Round Grove	Bulldogs		<1908	Independents	1954	none (consolidated into Wolcott)
Wolcott	Wolcott	Wildcats		<1908	Independents	1955	Midwest
Adams Township	Lockport	Tigers		1961	Carroll County	1963	none (consolidated into Twin Lakes)

== Whitley County League ==
Begun before 1916, the league folded in 1958, as the six schools consolidated down to three.

School	Location	Mascot	Colors	Year joined	Previous conference	Year left	Conference joined
Churubusco	Churubusco	Eagles		<1916		1958	Independents (ACAC 1968)
Coesse	Coesse	Indians		<1916		1958	none (consolidated into Columbia City)
Collins	Collins	Cougars		<1916		1922	none (consolidated into Churubusco)
Columbia City	Columbia City	Eagles		<1916		1927	NE Indiana
Etna	Etna	Eagles		<1916		1940	none (consolidated into Columbia City)
Jefferson Center	Saturn	Tigers		<1916		1958	none (consolidated into Columbia City)
Larwill	Larwill	Trojans		<1916		1958	Kosciusko County
South Whitley	South Whitley	Bulldogs		<1916		1958	Kosciusko County
Washington Center	Washington Center	Wildcats		<1916		1955	none (consolidated into Columbia City)
