= White River Valley Conference =

The White River Valley Conference was a short-lived athletic conference in southwestern Indiana. The conference started off well, sponsoring both varsity and junior varsity contests mainly in basketball and track. However, after three years, Bloomfield would leave to help found the Southwestern Indiana Athletic Conference. The year after, Spencer followed suit. This caused Clay City to rejoin their county conference, leaving the remaining four schools (all in Greene County) to do the same.

== Members ==
School	Location	Mascot	Colors	County	Year joined	Previous conference	Year left	Conference joined
Bloomfield^{1}	Bloomfield	Cardinals		28; Greene	1936	Greene County	1939	SW Indiana
Clay; City^{2}	Clay City	Eels		11; Clay	1936	Clay County	1940	Clay County
Jasonville	Jasonville	Yellow Jackets		28; Greene	1936	Greene County	1940	Greene County
Lyons	Lyons	Lions		28; Greene	1936	Greene County	1940	Greene County
Midland	Midland	Middies		28; Greene	1936	Greene County	1940	Greene County
Spencer	Spencer	Cops		60; Owen	1936	Tri-County (Central)	1940	SW Indiana
Switz City	Switz City	Switzers		28; Greene	1936	Greene County	1940	Greene County
