= Mid-Central Conference =

Conference in Indiana, US

The Mid-Central Conference was a short-lived Indiana High School Athletic Association (IHSAA)-sanctioned conference based in Northwest-Central Indiana. Formed in 1966, and based in Boone, Carroll, Clinton, and Tippecanoe counties, the conference was hit hard by the consolidation of smaller Tippecanoe County schools into Harrison and McCutcheon high schools. The consolidation of the latter left the conference with three schools, effectively ending it. The same three schools would form the Hoosier Heartland Conference 15 years later, which is another small-school conference with a similar geographic footprint.

== Membership ==
School	City	Team name	Colors	County	Year joined	Previous conference	Year left	Conference joined
Battle Ground	Battle Ground	Tomahawks		79; Tippecanoe	1966	Tippecanoe County	1970	none (consolidated into Harrison)
Carroll*	Flora	Cougars		08; Carroll	1966	Hoosier	1975	Hoosier
Clinton; Central	Michigantown	Bulldogs		12; Clinton	1966	Independents (new school 1959)	1975	Rangeline
Clinton; Prairie*	Frankfort	Gophers		12; Clinton	1966	Hoosier	1975	Rangeline
East Tipp	Buck Creek	Trojans		79; Tippecanoe	1966	Tippecanoe County	1970	none (consolidated into Harrison)
Southwestern	Shadeland	Wildcats		79; Tippecanoe	1966	Hoosier	1975	none (consolidated into McCutcheon)
Thorntown	Thorntown	Kewasakees		06; Boone	1966	Independents (BCC 1964)	1974	none (consolidated into Western Boone)
Wainwright	Dayton	Mustangs		79; Tippecanoe	1966	none (new school)	1975	none (consolidated into McCutcheon)

- Carroll and Clinton Prairie played concurrently in the HAC and MCC during the MCC's entire duration.
