= Perry High School =

Perry High School may refer to:

- Perry High School (Gilbert, Arizona) — Gilbert, Arizona
- Perry High School (Georgia) — Perry, Georgia
- Perry High School (Iowa) — Perry, Iowa
- Perry High School (Michigan) — Perry, Michigan
- Perry High School (New York) — Perry, New York
- Perry High School (Lima, Ohio) — Lima, Ohio
- Perry High School (Stark County, Ohio) — Perry Township, Ohio
- Perry High School (Perry, Ohio) — Perry, Ohio
- Perry High School (Oklahoma) — Perry, Oklahoma

It may also refer to:

- Perry-Casa High School — Casa, Arkansas
- Griggsville-Perry High School — Griggsville, Illinois
- Mary B. Perry High School — Camarillo, California
- Perry Meridian High School — Indianapolis, Indiana
- Perry Central Junior-Senior High School — Leopold, Indiana
- Perry Lecompton High School — Perry, Kansas
- Perry County Central High School — Hazard, Kentucky
- Perry Hall High School — Baltimore, Maryland
- Perry Central High School — New Augusta, Mississippi
- Fayetteville-Perry High School — Fayetteville, Ohio
- Port Perry High School — Port Perry, Ontario
- West Perry High School — Elliottsburg, Pennsylvania
- Commodore Perry Junior/Senior High School — Hadley, Pennsylvania
- Perry Traditional Academy — Pittsburgh, Pennsylvania
- Perry County High School — Linden, Tennessee
