= Union City High School =

Union City High School may refer to:

- Union City Community High School in Union City, Indiana
- Union City High School (Michigan) in Union City, Michigan
- Union City High School (New Jersey), in Union City, New Jersey
- Union City High School (Oklahoma) in Union City, Oklahoma
- Union City High School (Pennsylvania) in Union City, Pennsylvania
- Union City High School (Tennessee) in Union City, Tennessee
