= Bloomfield School District (Indiana) =

School district in Indiana

The Bloomfield School District is located in Greene County, Indiana, USA. Bloomfield School is located in Bloomfield, IN. The District includes the Bloomfield Middle and High School.

The district includes Bloomfield and the census-designated place of Scotland. Townships in the district include Highland, Richland, and Taylor.

There is another school that, according to the state, is in the Bloomfield School District, but it is not in Bloomfield, even though it has a Bloomfield Rural Route. This school is Eastern School located in Eastern Greene County, IN. Bloomfield Schools serve grades K-12. Kindergarten will go either all day every other day, or half day every day. All other grades go from 8:00 am to 3:00 pm. Recess is for grades K-6. In 4th grade, the teachers start moving from classroom to classroom, so the kids can get used to having a different teacher several times a day. The teachers do this until 6th grade. In 6th grade, the student moves to a different classroom 3 times a day. At the end of every day, the student goes back to his/her homeroom. From 7th grade on to 12th grade, the students move from class to class. There are 7 classes a day, and lunch. Each class is 50 minutes long, with a 4-minute passing period. Lunch is 30 minutes long.
