= Capital District Conference =

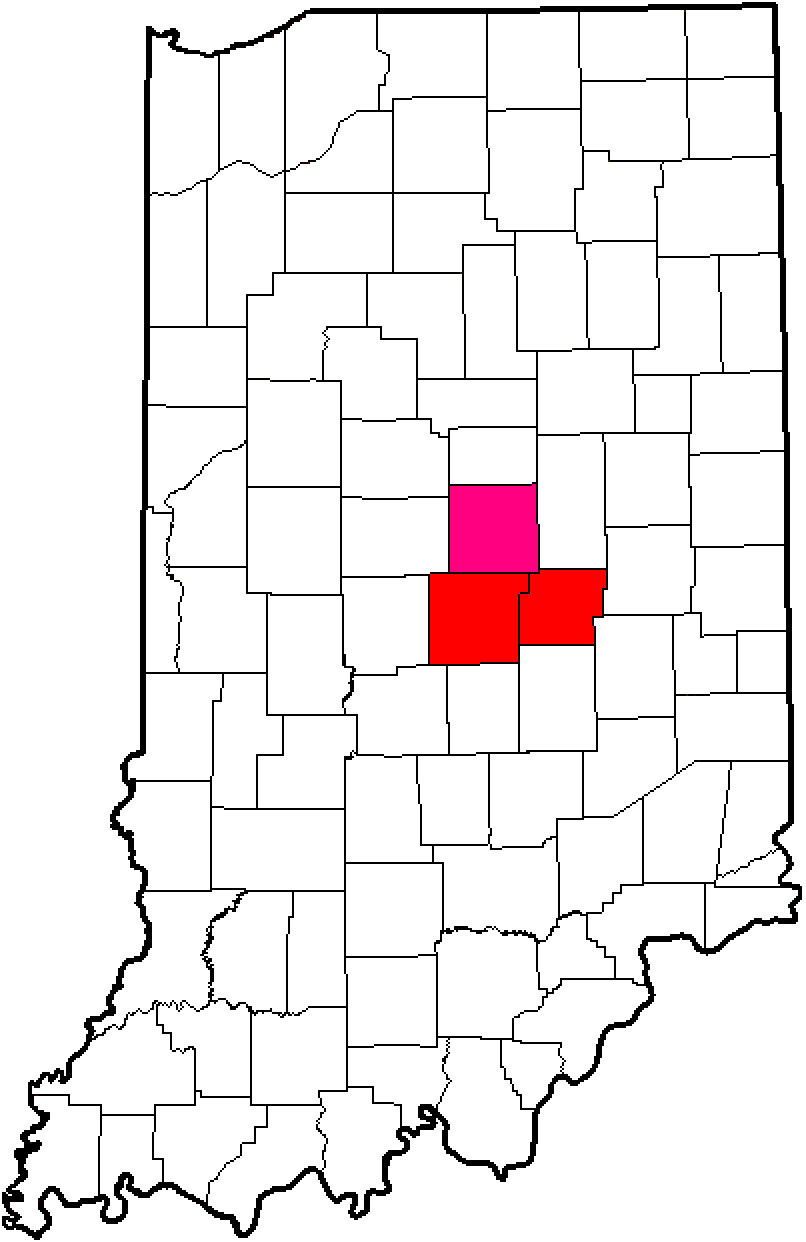
The Capital District Conference in Indiana. Counties in red contained schools at the time of disbanding, counties in pink contained former member schools who left before conference folded.

The Capital District Conference was an IHSAA-sanctioned conference from 1945 to 1971. Made up of Indianapolis area schools, it included smaller suburban schools and private schools until the growth of the suburban Indianapolis area had caused the public schools to grow larger. These schools eventually sought out similar-sized schools to compete with, and by 1971, these schools became the nucleus of the Central Suburban Conference, as more suburban public schools joined, with the smaller private schools dropping out to become independent.

== Schools ==
School	Location	Mascot	Colors	# / County	Year joined	Previous conference	Year left	Conference joined
Beech Grove	Beech Grove	Hornets		49; Marion	1945	Independents	1971	Central Suburban
Franklin Central^{1}	Indianapolis	Flashes		49; Marion	1945	Marion County	1971	Central Suburban
Indiana School for the Deaf	Indianapolis	Deaf; Hoosiers		49; Marion	1945	Independents	1971	Independents
Pike	Indianapolis	Red Devils		49; Marion	1945	Marion County	1971	Central Suburban
Sacred Heart	Indianapolis	Spartans		49; Marion	1945	Independents	1966	none (school closed)
Lawrence Central	Indianapolis	Bears		49; Marion	1949	Mid-State	1971	Central Suburban
Carmel^{2}	Carmel	Greyhounds		29; Hamilton	1952	Hamilton County	1967	Sagamore
Jackson Central^{3}	Arcadia	Eagles		29; Hamilton	1961	Hamilton County	1965	none (consolidated into Hamilton Heights)
Greenfield	Greenfield	Tigers		30; Hancock	1953	Hancock County	1969	none (consolidated into Greenfield; Central)
Greenfield; Central	Greenfield	Cougars		30; Hancock	1969	none (new school)	1971	Central Suburban

1. Franklin Central was known as Franklin Township until 1960.
2. Carmel played concurrently in the CDC and HCC 1952–58.
3. Jackson Central played concurrently in the CDC and HCC 1961–65.

== Resources ==
- Almanac Sports- Capital District Conference
