= Whitko Community School Corporation =

School district in Indiana

Coordinates: 41°21′43.8″N 85°38′20.6″W

Whitko Community School Corporation is a school district in northeast Indiana that serves areas of southwest Whitley and southeast Kosciusko counties, including the communities of South Whitley, Pierceton, Larwill, Sidney, and Collamer. The name is a combination of Whitley and Kosciusko.

== Schools ==
School's name	Location
South Whitley Elementary	South Whitley
Pierceton Elementary	Pierceton
Whitko Career Academy	Larwill
Whitko Jr/Sr High	South Whitley
