= Indiana State Fair Band Day =

Music for All Indiana State Fair Band Day presented by Music Travel Consultants
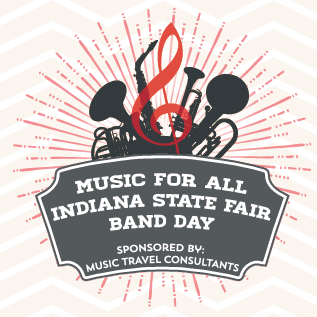
- Indiana State Fair Band Day logo for 2015
- Location: Indiana State Fairgrounds, Indianapolis, Indiana
- Founded: 1947
- First champions: Grant County Combined Band
- Current champions: Anderson High School (Indiana) — The Marching Highlanders
- Website: http://www.indianatrackmarchingbands.com/

The Indiana State Fair Band Day is a marching band competition held at the Indiana State Fair in Indianapolis every August. The contest serves as the championship for the Central Indiana Track Show Association, an organization that governs high school track show marching band contests in Indiana each summer.

First held in 1947, it is one of, if not the oldest, high school marching band contest in the United States. The 77th Indiana State Fair Band Day competition was held on 2 August 2024.

== Contest format ==
Indiana high school marching bands participate in the Indiana State Fair Band Day every year. Bands are categorized into three classes—Class AAA, Class AA, and Class A—based on band size. Each band is allowed up to six minutes to perform, two minutes for entry and one minute to exit the performance area. Preliminary competition takes place in the morning, with awards for first through third place in each class, along with caption awards for best music, visuals, auxiliary (guard), and percussion. The 16 top scoring bands, regardless of class, compete in the finals competition that night.

== Results ==
Year	Champion	Runner up
2025	Anderson High School	Muncie Central High School
2024	Muncie Central High School	Anderson High School
2023	Kokomo High School	Muncie Central High School
2022	Kokomo High School	Winchester Community High School
2021	Muncie Central High School	Centerville Senior High School
2020	No Contest (Covid)	No Contest (Covid)
2019	Anderson High School	Kokomo High School
2018	Noblesville High School	Anderson High School
2017	Noblesville High School	Winchester Community
2016	Winchester Community	Kokomo High School

See the full history of Band Day Results dating back to 1947 on the CITSA website: Band Day Hall of Champions

== Records ==
Record	School	Number	Year(s)
Most Championships	Anderson	8	1957, 1958, 1959, 1985, 1986, 2010, 2019, 2025
Most Consecutive Championships	Franklin Central	4	1993, 1994, 1995, 1996
Highest Finals Score	Kokomo	96.300	2022
Highest Runner Up Score	Winchester Community	93.950	2022
Most Band Day Appearances	Anderson	69 (all consecutive)	1955-2025
Most Finals Appearances	Richmond	55	1967-1983, 1985-1994, 1996, 1998-2019, 2021-2025
Largest Margin of Victory	Muncie Southside over Anderson Highland	8.25	2004
Smallest Margin of Victory	Winchester Community over Richmond	0.05	2011
Most Class Victories	Centerville Blue Regiment	13	2012-2025
Most Years Between Championships	Noblesville	65 years	1952 and 2017
Most Wins by Director	Douglas Fletcher	13	1989, 1990, 1991, 1997, 2005-07, 2009-13, 2015-16

== Prize money ==
1st Place	$3700
2nd Place	$3200
3rd Place	$2700
4th Place	$2400
5th Place	$2100
6th Place	$1700
7th Place	$1600
8th Place	$1500
9th Place	$1400
10th Place	$1300
11th-16th Place	$1100
17th-25th Place	$850
26th-30th Place	$600
31st-49th Place	$500
