= Tri-County Conference (Central Indiana) =

American scholastic athletic conference

The Tri-County Conference of Central Indiana was founded in 1935, as the county schools in Monroe, Morgan, and Owen counties joined to stabilize their schedules. The conference wound up in 1971, as only three schools from Monroe County remained, and they would close three years later. Out of the four leagues bearing the TCC moniker that existed in Indiana, this has the distinction of being both the first and the last one remaining at the time of its demise.

== Members ==
School	Location	Mascot	Colors	County	Year joined	Previous conference	Year left	Conference joined
Coal City	Coal City	Colts		60; Owen	1935	Owen County	1970	none (consolidated into Owen Valley)
Ellettsville	Ellettsville	Golden Eagles		53; Monroe	1935	Monroe County	1939	Southwestern Indiana
Eminence	Eminence	Eels		55; Morgan	1935	Morgan County	1955	Little 8
Freedom	Freedom	Aces		60; Owen	1935	Owen County	1970	none (consolidated into Owen Valley)
Gosport	Gosport	Indians		60; Owen	1935	Owen County	1970	none (consolidated into Owen Valley)
Monrovia	Monrovia	Bulldogs		55; Morgan	1935	Morgan County	1971	West Central
Morgantown^{1}	Morgantown	Trojans		55; Morgan	1935	Johnson County/ Morgan County	1939	Johnson County
Paragon	Paragon	Panthers		55; Morgan	1935	Morgan County	1956	none (consolidated into Martinsville)
Patricksburg	Patricksburg	Bulldogs		60; Owen	1935	Owen County	1970	none (consolidated into Owen Valley)
Quincy	Quincy	Aces		60; Owen	1935	Owen County	1970	none (consolidated into Cloverdale)
Smithville	Smithville	Skibos		53; Monroe	1935	Monroe County	1974	none (consolidated into Bloomington South)
Spencer	Spencer	Cops		60; Owen	1935	Owen County	1936	White River Valley
Stinesville	Stinesville	Quarry Lads		53; Monroe	1935	Monroe County	1964	none (consolidated into Edgewood)
Unionville	Unionville	Arrows		53; Monroe	1935	Monroe County	1974	none (consolidated into Bloomington North)
University	Bloomington	Univees		53; Monroe	1935	Monroe County	1974	none (school closed)

1. Played concurrently in the JCC and TCC 1935-
