= Winchester Community High School =

Location
- 700 Union Street; Winchester, Randolph County, Indiana 47394; United States; 40.180992°N 84.975065°W

Information
- Type: Public high school
- School district: Randolph Central School Corporation
- Principal: Karla Reed
- Faculty: 34.33 FTE
- Grades: 9-12
- Enrollment: 408 (2023-24)
- Color
- Athletics conference: Tri-Eastern
- Team name: Golden Falcons
- Website: Official website

Winchester Community High School is a public high school located in Winchester, Indiana, United States. The School serves the town of Winchester and surrounding area.

In 2023 the student body was about 93 percent white and 4 percent hispanic.

== Athletics ==
Winchester Community High School's athletic teams are the Golden Falcons and they compete in the Tri-Eastern Conference. The Golden Falcons' primary rival is county foe Union City High School. The school offers a wide range of athletics including:

- Basketball (Men's and Women's)
- Wrestling
- Softball
- Tennis (Men's & Women's)
- Baseball
- Golf (Men's & Women's)
- Track and Field

== Band ==
Home to the Winchester Community High School Marching Band THE FORCE.

ISSMA State Championships: 1974, 1975, 1977, 1978, 1979, 1980, 1986, and 1987.

Indiana State Fair Band Day Champion 1997, 2011, 2012, 2013, 2015, and 2016.

== See also ==
- List of high schools in Indiana
