= Western Indiana Small High School Conference =

Defunct high school sports league in Indiana, US

- Sport: High school athletics
- Founded: 1957
- No. of teams: See below

The Western Indiana Small High School Conference was a short-lived IHSAA-sanctioned conference that was formed in 1957. The conference was made up of high schools with less than 100 students in Benton and White counties. The conference only lasted four years, as all but one of the schools consolidated into larger schools.

== Former members ==
| School | Location | Mascot | Colors | County | Year joined | Previous conference | Year left | Conference joined |
|---|---|---|---|---|---|---|---|---|
| Chalmers | Chalmers | Cardinals | | 91; White | 1957 | White County | 1961 | Prairie |
| Earl Park | Earl Park | Cardinals | | 04; Benton | 1957 | Benton County | 1961 | none (consolidated into Fowler) |
| Freeland Park | Freeland Park | Rockets | | 04; Benton | 1957 | Benton County | 1961 | none (consolidated into Fowler) |
| Gilboa Township | Wadena | Wildcats | | 04; Benton | 1957 | Benton County | 1960 | none (consolidated into Remington) |
| Pine Township | Fowler | Eagles | | 04; Benton | 1957 | Benton County | 1961 | none (consolidated into Oxford) |
| Raub | Raub | Ramblers | | 04; Benton | 1957 | Benton County | 1961 | none (consolidated into Kentland) |
| Wadena | Wadena | Indians | | 04; Benton | 1957 | Benton County | 1961 | none (consolidated into Fowler) |
