= Whitko High School =

Whitko Jr./Sr. High School
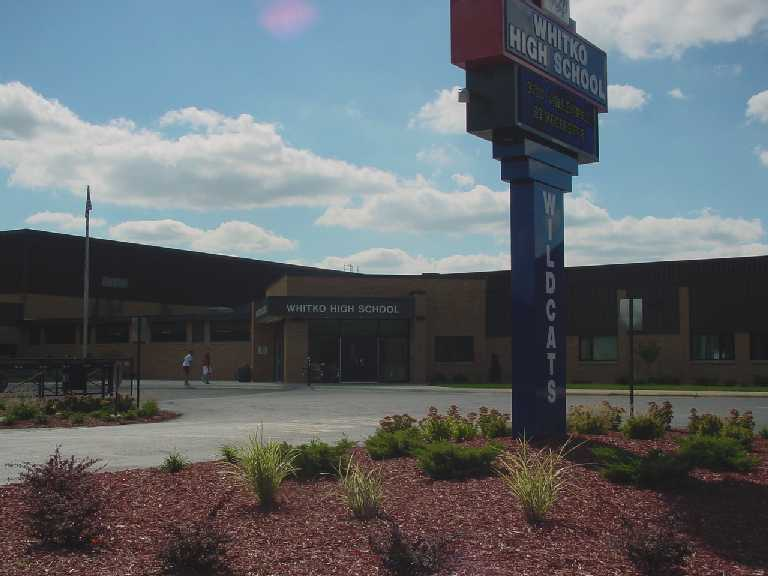

Location
- 1 Big Blue Ave; South Whitley, Indiana 46787-1455; United States
- Coordinates: 41°05′02″N 85°37′58″W

Information
- Type: Public High School
- Motto: Excellence for All
- Established: 1971
- School district: Whitko Community School Corporation
- Superintendent: Dr. Amy Korus
- Principal: Kathy Longenbaugh
- Teaching staff: 55.33 (FTE)
- Grades: 7-12
- Enrollment: 556 (2023–2024)
- Student to teacher ratio: 10.05
- Hours in school day: 7
- Color
- Athletics conference: Three Rivers Conference (Indiana)
- Nickname: Wildcats
- Team name: Wildcats
- Website: whitko.org/wjshs

Whitley-Kosciusko Consolidated High School, also known as Whitko Jr./Sr. High School, is a public high school located in South Whitley, Indiana.

== Athletics ==
Whitko Jr./Sr. High School's athletic teams are the Wildcats and they compete in the Three Rivers Conference. The school offers a wide range of athletics including:

- Football
- Wrestling
- Basketball
- Cross Country
- Track and Field
- Baseball
- Softball
- Golf
- Soccer
- Volleyball
- Archery

== See also ==
- List of high schools in Indiana
