= Rushville Consolidated High School =

- Rushville, Rush County, Indiana; United States

Information
- Enrollment: 645 (2023-24)
- Color
- Team name: Lions
- Website: School website

Rushville Consolidated High School, also known as "RCHS", is a high school in Rushville, Indiana, United States.

== History ==
The school was formerly Rushville High School with the first graduating class in 1871.

== Athletics ==
The school mascot is the lion, and the school colors are black and red. The men's athletic teams are referred to as Lions, and the women's teams are referred to as Lady Lions.

== See also ==
- List of high schools in Indiana
