= Wapahani High School =

Location
- 10401 East County Road 167 South; Selma, Delaware County, Indiana 47383; United States; 40.167659°N 85.263950°W

Information
- Type: Public high school
- Established: 1967
- School district: Liberty-Perry Community Schools
- Superintendent: Aaron Black
- Principal: Mark Fahey
- Teaching staff: 28.50 (FTE)
- Grades: 9-12
- Enrollment: 334 (2023–2024)
- Student to teacher ratio: 11.72
- Color
- Team name: Raiders
- Website: whs Official Website

Wapahani High School is a high school located near Selma, Indiana. The school is the only high school for the community, which is served by Liberty-Perry Community Schools.

== History ==
Wapahani High School was founded in 1967 to replace Selma and Center High Schools. Wapahani is a Delaware Indian word for White River, whose west fork runs a few hundred yards behind the school.

== Demographics ==
The demographic breakdown of the 358 students enrolled for the 2021–2022 school year was:

- Male - 50.6%
- Female - 49.4%
- Hispanic - 0.1%
- Black - 0.1%
- White - 92.5%
- Multiracial - 4.7%

In addition, 37.4% of the students were eligible for free or reduced lunches.

== Athletics ==
The Raiders are members of the Mid-Eastern Conference. The following IHSAA sanctioned sports are offered at Wapahani:

- Baseball (boys)
  - State champion - 2014
- Basketball (girls & boys)
- Cross country (girls & boys)
- Golf (girls & boys)
- Soccer (girls & boys)
- Softball (girls)
- Track (girls & boys)
- Volleyball (girls)
  - State champion - 2002, 2011, 2012, 2015, 2016, 2022
- Wrestling (boys)

== See also ==
- List of high schools in Indiana
