= Fountain Central High School =

Location
- 750 East US Highway 136; Veedersburg, Indiana 47987; United States
- 40.106214°N 87.226692°W

Information
- Type: Public high school
- Principal: Rob Beckett
- Teaching staff: 42.33 (FTE)
- Grades: 6-12
- Enrollment: 508 (2023-2024)
- Student to teacher ratio: 12.00
- Color
- Team name: Mustangs
- Rivals: Covington
- Website: fc.sefschools.org

Fountain Central High School is a public high school in Veedersburg, Indiana, United States.

== Notable alumni ==
- Warrior (born James Hellwig, better known as "Ultimate Warrior"), professional wrestler, WWE champion

== See also ==
- List of high schools in Indiana
