= Hauser Junior-Senior High School =

Location
- 9273 North SR 9 Hope, Bartholomew County, Indiana 47246; United States
- Coordinates: 39.292597°N 85.770017°W

Information
- Type: Public high school
- School district: Flat Rock-Hawcreek School Corporation
- Principal: Kris Fortune
- Staff: 34.00 (FTE)
- Grades: 7-12
- Enrollment: 417 (2023–2024)
- Student to teacher ratio: 12.26
- Color(s)
- Team name: Jets
- Website: Official Website

Hauser Junior-Senior High School is a public high school located in Hope, Indiana.

== See also ==
- List of high schools in Indiana
