= Bloomfield Middle and High School =

Bloomfield Junior-Senior High School
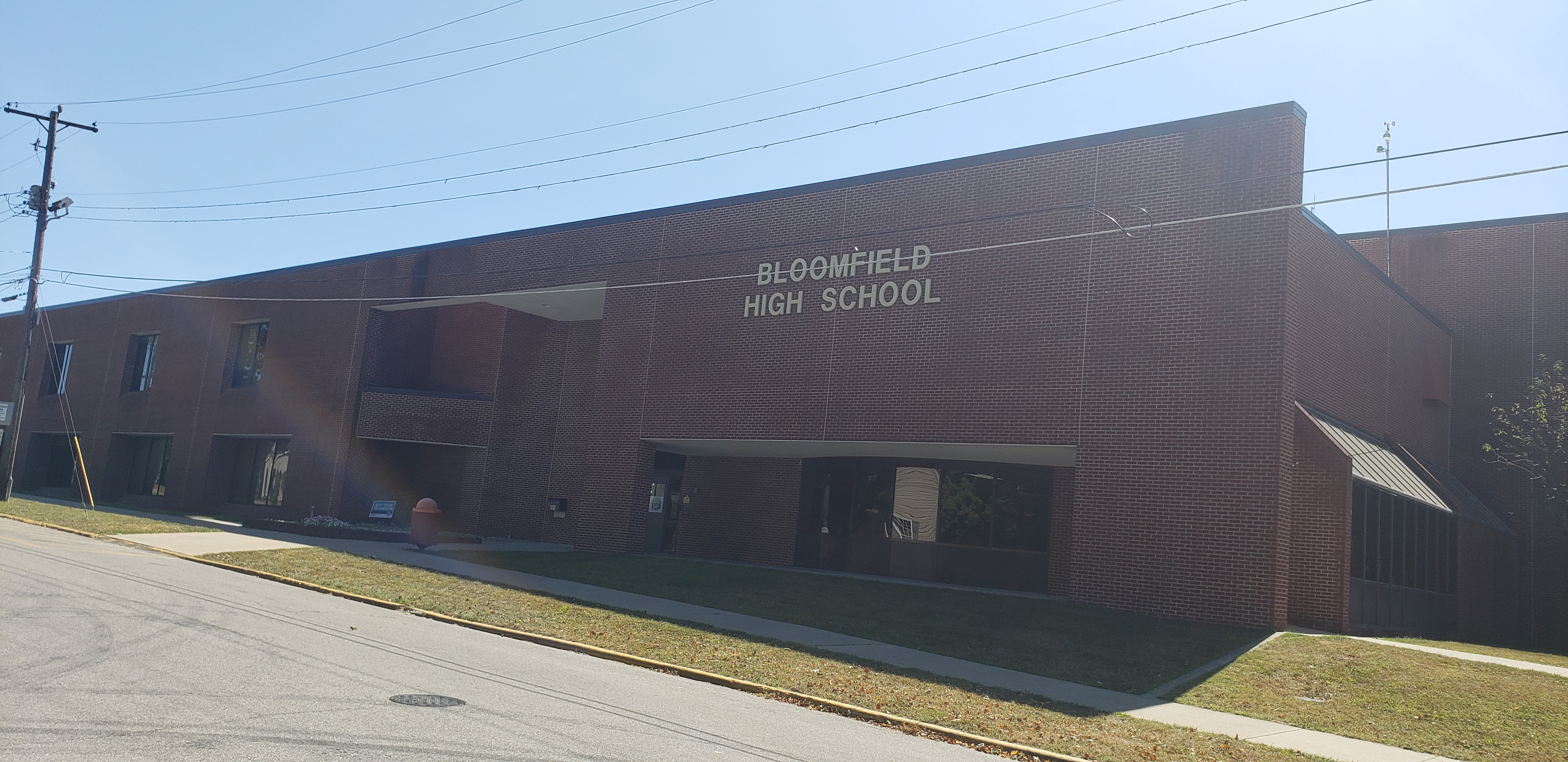

Location
- 501 West Spring Street; Bloomfield, Indiana 47424; United States; 39.025003°N 86.946672°W

Information
- Type: Public high school
- Established: 1850; 176 years ago
- School district: Bloomfield School District (Indiana)
- Superintendent: Jeff Gibboney
- Principal: David M. Dean
- Teaching staff: 21.50 (FTE)
- Grades: 6–12
- Enrollment: 220 (2023–2024)
- Student to teacher ratio: 10.23
- Colors: Red and white
- Team name: Cardinals
- Rivals: White River Valley High School
- Website: mshs.bloomfield.k12.in.us

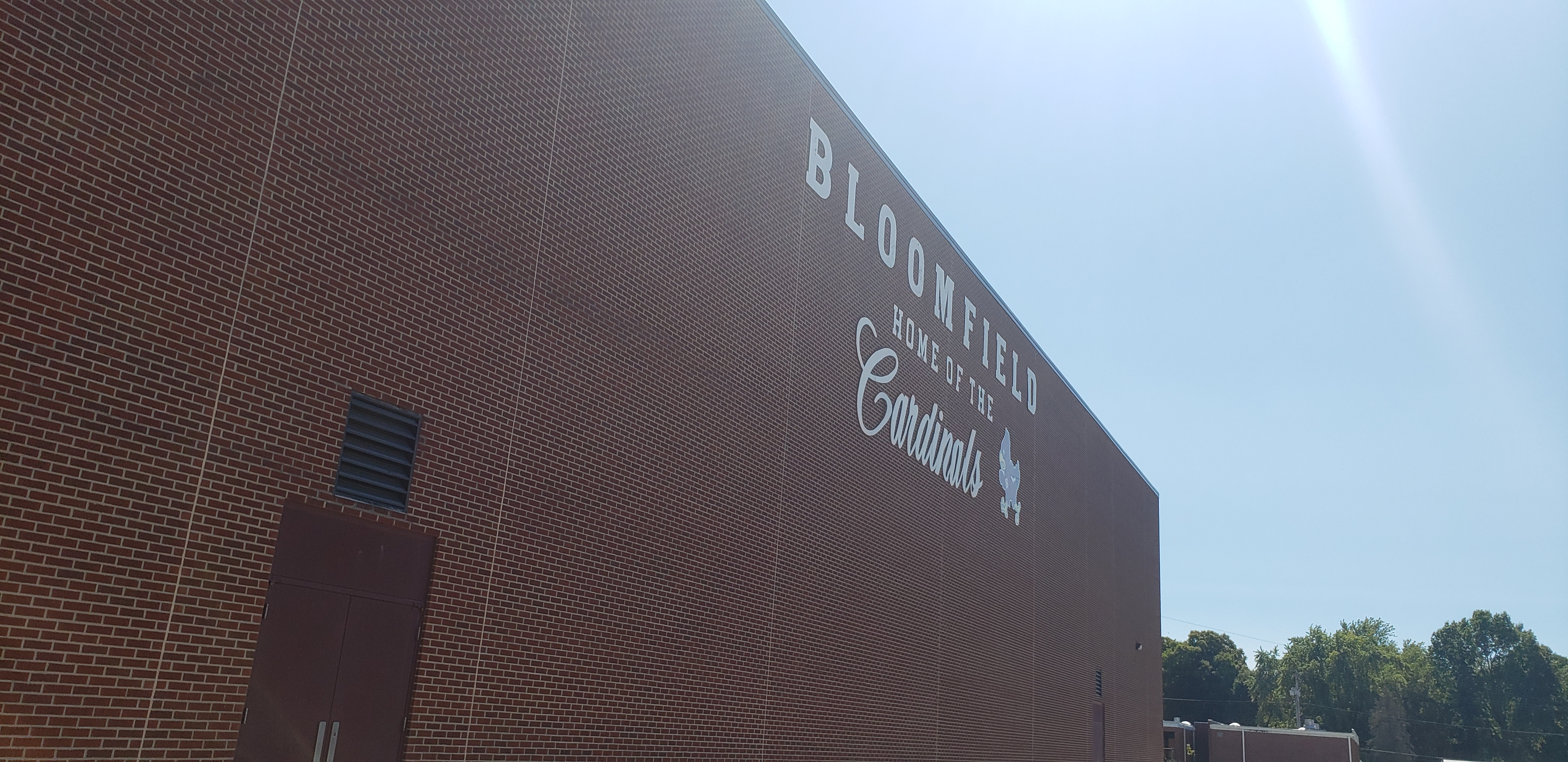
Bloomfield High School

Bloomfield Middle and High School is a public secondary school in Bloomfield, Indiana, United States, that was established in 1850. It is part of Bloomfield School District and serves approximately 350 students from the community of Bloomfield, Indiana. The school mascot is the cardinal, and the colors are red and white.

== See also ==
- List of high schools in Indiana
