= Tippecanoe Valley High School =

Location
- 8345 South SR 19; Akron, Kosciusko County, Indiana 46910; United States; 41.109641°N 86.038613°W

Information
- Type: Public high school
- Superintendent: Blaine Conley
- Principal: Brandon Kreska
- Teaching staff: 34.00 (FTE)
- Grades: 9–12
- Enrollment: 543 (2023–2024)
- Student to teacher ratio: 15.97
- Color
- Athletics conference: Indiana Northern State Conference
- Team name: Vikings
- Rivals: Rochester Zebras
- Website: tvhs.tvsc.k12.in.us

Tippecanoe Valley High School is a public high school located in Akron, Indiana, United States. Home of the Vikings.

== See also ==
- List of high schools in Indiana
