= Randolph Southern Junior-Senior High School =

Location
- 2 Rebel Drive; Lynn, Randolph County, Indiana 47355; United States
- 40.051705°N 84.945530°W

Information
- Type: Public high school
- School district: Randolph Southern School Corporation
- Principal: DJ Knotts
- Teaching staff: 16.00 (FTE)
- Grades: 7-12
- Enrollment: 211 (2023-2024)
- Student to teacher ratio: 13.19
- Color
- Athletics conference: Mid-Eastern Conference
- Team name: Rebels
- Website: Official website

Randolph Southern Junior-Senior High School is a public high school located in Lynn, Indiana.

The current school building was built in 1974.

== Athletics ==
Randolph Southern Junior-Senior High school's athletic teams are known as the Rebels and compete in the Mid-Eastern Conference. The school offers a wide range of athletics including:

- Baseball
- Basketball (Men's and Women's)
- Cheerleading
- Cross country
- Golf (Men's only)
- Softball
- Tennis (Men's and Women's)
- Track & Field (Men's and Women's)
- Volleyball
- Wrestling

== See also ==
- List of high schools in Indiana
