= Southern Wells Jr./Sr. High School =

Location
- 9120 S 300 W Poneto, Wells County, Indiana 46781; United States
- Coordinates: 40.6083°N 85.2784°W

Information
- Type: Public high school
- School district: Southern Wells Community Schools
- Staff: 32.00 (FTE)
- Grades: 7-12
- Enrollment: 384 (2023-2024)
- Student to teacher ratio: 12.00
- Color
- Athletics conference: Allen County Athletic Conference
- Team name: Raiders
- Website: SWS

Southern Wells Jr./Sr. High School is a public high school located approximately 4.5 miles southwest of Poneto, Indiana in greater Wells County. Southern Wells serves the entire elementary, junior high and high school for the area. The school was opened after a consolidation between Jackson, Chester, Nottingham, and Liberty Schools. Southern Wells Schools are located in the southern part of the county on county road 300 West.

== Athletics ==
Southern Wells High School football team was the 2001 state championship for division 1A.

== See also ==
- List of high schools in Indiana
