= Jay County Jr-Sr High School =

Location
- 2072 W. State Road 67; Portland, Indiana, (Jay County), Indiana 47371; United States; 40°25′48″N 85°1′24″W

Information
- Established: 1975
- School district: Jay School Corporation
- Superintendent: Jeremy Gulley
- Principal: Chad Dodd
- Teaching staff: 81.75 (FTE)
- Grades: 7–12
- Enrollment: 1,278 (2023–2024)
- Student to teacher ratio: 15.63
- Campus type: Rural
- Color
- Athletics conference: Allen County Athletic Conference
- Team name: Patriots
- Newspaper: Jay Today
- Website: jayschoolcorp.org/o/jr-sr-high-school

Jay County Jr-Sr High School is a public high school located on the outskirts of Portland, Indiana, United States. It was formed in 1975 as a consolidation of the high schools from the towns of Bryant, Dunkirk, Pennville, Portland, and Redkey. In 2020, the school was built to hold seventh and eight grade students.

== Athletics ==
Jay County Jr-Sr High School's sports teams are nicknamed the Patriots. The Patriots were previous members of the Olympic Conference until 2010, and have been members of the Allen County Athletic Conference since the 2014–15 school year.

=== Sports ===
- American football
- Archery
- Baseball
- Boys Basketball
- Girls Basketball
- Cheerleading
- Boys Cross County
- Girls Cross County
- Boys Golf
- Girls Golf
- Gymnastics
- Boys Swimming (sport) and Diving
- Girls Swimming (sport) and Diving
- Boys Soccer
- Girls Soccer
- Softball
- Boys Track and Field
- Girls Track and Field
- Boys Tennis
- Girls Tennis
- Volleyball
- Wrestling
- Cheerleading

== Other extracurriculars ==
- Academic Competition
- American Sign Language Club
- Art Club
- Best Buddies
- Color Guard
- Drama Club
- FFA
- German Club
- International Thespian Society
- Jay Today
- Marching Band
- National Honor Society
- Patriot Edition, Danza, Treble
- Robotics Club
- Student Council

== Notable people ==
- Mary Meeker

== See also ==
- List of high schools in Indiana
