= Manchester High School (Indiana) =

Manchester Junior-Senior High School
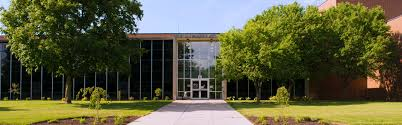
- Main office entrance

Location
- 1 Squire Drive; North Manchester, Wabash County, Indiana 46962; United States; 41.009374°N 85.772688°W

Information
- Type: Public high school
- Established: c.1958
- School district: Manchester Community Schools
- Principal: Brady McClure
- Teaching staff: 45.17 (FTE)
- Grades: 7-12
- Enrollment: 666 (2023–2024)
- Student to teacher ratio: 14.74
- Colors: Red, black, and white
- Fight song: Manchester School song
- Athletics conference: Three Rivers Conference
- Mascot: Squire Sam
- Team name: Squires
- Yearbook: Crest
- Website: Official website

Manchester Junior-Senior High School is a public high school located in North Manchester, Indiana.

== Athletics ==
Manchester Junior-Senior High School's athletic teams are the Squires and they compete in the Three Rivers Conference. The school offers a wide range of athletics including:

- Baseball
- Softball
- Basketball (boys and girls)
- Cheerleading
- Cross Country (boys and girls)
- Football
- Golf (boys and girls)
- Soccer (boys and girls)
- Swimming (boys and girls)
- Tennis (boys and girls)
- Track (boys and girls)
- Volleyball
- Wrestling (boys and girls)

=== Baseball ===
The 2001–02 baseball team won the 2A IHSAA Baseball State Championship defeating Batesville High School by a score of 9–8.

=== Basketball ===
The 2024–25 basketball team won the 2A IHSAA Basketball State Championship defeating University High School by a score of 59–54. Grace College signs Gavin Betten and Ethan Hendrix both scored 21 points each in this game.

== See also ==
- List of high schools in Indiana
