= Monroe Central Junior-Senior High School =

Public high school in Indiana, United States

Location
- 1878 North County Road 1000 West; Parker City, Randolph County, Indiana 47368; United States
- 40.191914°N 85.167629°W

Information
- Type: Public high school
- School district: Monroe Central School Corporation
- Superintendent: Adrian Moulton
- Principal: David Retherford
- Teaching staff: 33.50 (FTE)
- Grades: 7-12
- Enrollment: 466 (2023–2024)
- Student to teacher ratio: 13.91
- Color
- Athletics conference: Mid-Eastern Conference
- Team name: Golden Bears
- Website: Official Website

Monroe Central Junior-Senior High School is a public high school located in Parker City, Indiana.

== Athletics ==
Monroe Central Junior-Senior High school's athletic teams are known as the Golden Bears and compete in the Mid-Eastern Conference. The school offers a wide range of athletics including:

- Football
- Baseball
- Basketball (Men's and Women's)
- Cheerleading
- Cross country (Men's and Women's)
- Golf (Men's and Women's)
- Track and field (Men's and Women's)
- Softball
- Volleyball
- Wrestling

== Football ==
Head Coach: John Hochstetler "Coach Ho"

The first official varsity football game played for the Golden Bears was a sectional playoff game against the Tri Titans on October 23, 2009. The 2015–2016 Golden Bears football team went 9–3 and made it to the sectional finals for the first time in school history. Additionally, three players received honorable mention by the AP. In 2016–2017 the Golden Bears went 11–1 undefeated in the regular season for their first time making it to the sectional finals for the second time in school history. In 2017–2018 season the Golden Bears went 12–2 (school record) which resulted in their first regional and sectional titles. 2018–2019 saw the Golden Bears go 10–3 and repeat as sectional champions. The 2020–2021 (COVID-19 season) Golden Bears saw their first MEC conference championship which led to a 7–2 record having lost once in regular season and in the sectional final to the eventual State Runner Ups South Adams Starfires. The 2021–2022 season saw another undefeated season and MEC championship but a loss in the sectional championship called the "Mud Bowl" featured on ESPN final score was 6–3 in favor of the South Adams Starfires.

- The Golden Bears Football Team currently has 12 IFCA All-State Players.

== See also ==
- List of high schools in Indiana
