= Brown County High School (Indiana) =

Location
- 235 School House Lane; Nashville, Brown County, Indiana 47448; United States
- Coordinates: 39.204462°N 86.244135°W

Information
- Type: Public high school
- School district: Brown County School Corporation
- Superintendent: Emily Callahan
- Principal: Sarah Roberts
- Teaching staff: 39.00 (FTE)
- Grades: 9-12
- Enrollment: 455 (2024–2025)
- Student to teacher ratio: 11.67
- Color
- Team name: Eagles
- Rivals: Indian Creek
- Newspaper: The Eagles Nest

Brown County High School is a public high school in Nashville, Indiana, United States.

== See also ==
- List of high schools in Indiana
- Western Indiana Conference
