= Southwestern Junior-Senior High School =

Southwestern High School

Location
- 3406 West 600 South; Shelbyville, Shelby County, Indiana 46176; United States
- Coordinates: 39.441055°N 85.845690°W

Information
- Type: Public high school
- Principal: Curtis Chase
- Faculty: 23.0 (FTE)
- Grades: 7–12
- Enrollment: 280 (2023-24)
- Student to teacher ratio: 12.17
- Color
- Athletics conference: Mid-Hoosier Conference
- Team name: Spartans
- Website: Official website

Southwestern High School is a public high school located approximately 7 miles southwest of Shelbyville, Indiana.

== Athletics ==
Southwestern High School's athletic teams are the Spartans and they compete in the Mid-Hoosier Conference. The school offers a wide range of athletics including:

- Baseball
- Basketball (boys and girls)
- Cross Country (boys and girls)
- Golf
- Tennis (boys and girls)
- Track and Field (boys and girls)
- Soccer
- Softball
- Volleyball

=== Basketball ===
The 2015–2016 boys basketball team went 14–11 overall and lost to Tindley High School (53–49) in the 2015–16 IHSAA Class 1A Boys Basketball State Tournament.

== See also ==
- List of high schools in Indiana
