= Fairfield Junior-Senior High School =

Location
- 67530 US 33; Goshen, Elkhart County, Indiana 46526; United States
- 41°31′04″N 85°46′04″W

Information
- Type: Public
- School district: Fairfield Community Schools
- Superintendent: Dr. Carrie Cannon
- Principal: Jason Grasty
- Teaching staff: 56.83 (FTE basis)
- Grades: 7 to 12
- Enrollment: 944 (2024-2025)
- Student to teacher ratio: 16.61
- Color
- Team name: Falcons
- Website: School website

Fairfield Junior-Senior High School is public secondary school located in Goshen, Indiana, United States, and part of Fairfield Community Schools. It serves about 875 students in grades 7 through 12 coming from Benton Elementary School, Millersburg Elementary School, and New Paris Elementary School.

== Demographics ==
The demographic breakdown of the 2023-2024 enrollment is:

- White - 88.2%
- Hispanic - 9.3%
- Multiracial - 1.71%
- Asian/Pacific Islander - 0.22%
- Black - 0.57%
- Native American - 0.01%
- Male - 50.05%
- Female - 49.95%

== Athletics ==
Fairfield's school colors are navy blue and gold. Its athletic teams compete as the Falcons. They are part of the Northeast Corner Conference

Henry and Harley Garl play football at Fairfield HS.

(NECC).[2] The following IHSAA sports are offered:[3]

- Baseball (boys)
- Basketball (boys and girls)
- Cross Country (boys and girls)
- Football (boys)
- Golf (boys and girls)
- Softball (girls)
- Tennis (boys and girls)
- Track and field (boys and girls)
- Volleyball (girls)
- Wrestling (boys and girls)

The girls basketball team won the 2023 IHSAA 3A State Championship. That same team held its opponents to an average of only 28.3 points per game. The best in the state.

== See also ==
- List of high schools in Indiana
