= Midland Conference =

Former American high school athletic conference in Indiana, United States

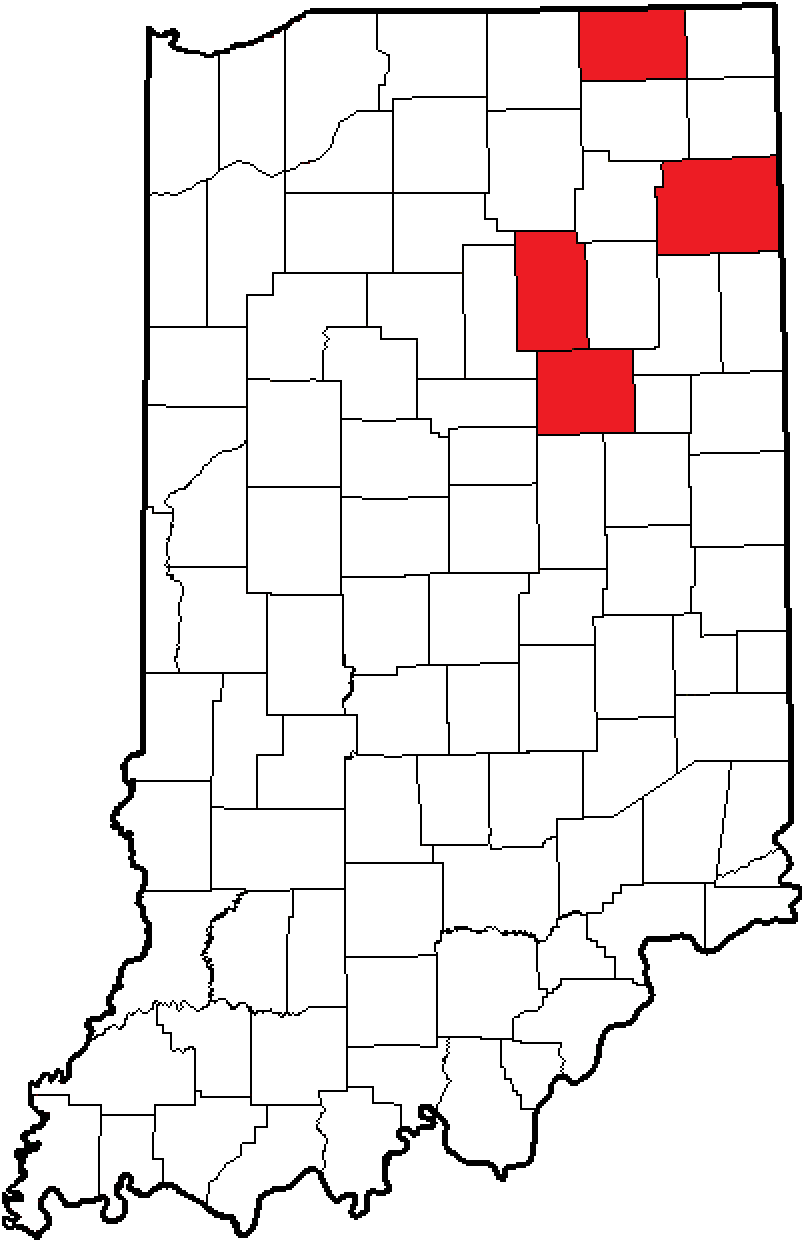
The Midland Conference in Indiana

The Midland Conference was an IHSAA-sanctioned conference located in North Central and Northeast Indiana. Except for having three members between 1981 and 1982 notwithstanding, the conference stayed between four and six members through its lifetime. The conference consisted mostly of private schools, with one public school and one military academy holding membership at some point.

== History ==
The conference was formed in 1971 with 6 schools: Bethany Christian, Divine Heart, Huntington Catholic, Kewanna, Wawasee Prep, and White's. Divine Child left after the first year, and was replaced by Marion Bennett in 1973–74. Wawassee Prep closed in 1975, leaving the conference at 5 until 1981. That year, Kewanna was consolidated into Caston Jr.-Sr. High School, and Bethany Christian became independent. The remaining schools (Huntington Catholic, Marion Bennett, and White's) continued the conference unofficially for a year, then Fort Wayne Christian (later Fort Wayne Keystone) joined in 1982, and Howe Military joined two years later. This lineup only lasted one season, as Fort Wayne Canterbury replaced the closing Huntington Catholic. Bethany Christian joined for the 1987–88 school year, and were replaced by Lakeview Christian in 1988. Once Marion Bennett closed in 1993, the conference entered its most stable lineup, not changing until Lakewood Park Christian joined in 2000. Canterbury left in 2002, followed by Lakewood Park leaving in 2009, leaving four schools. Keystone closed after the 2009–10 school year, and with Howe, Lakeview, and White's unable to find replacement schools, the conference disbanded after that season.

== Membership ==
School	Location	Mascot	Colors	County	Year joined	Previous conference	Year left	Conference joined
Bethany Christian	Goshen	Bruins		20; Elkhart	1971; 1987	Independents	1981; 1988	Independents; Independents
Divine Heart	Donaldson	Chargers		50; Marshall	1971		1972	Independents (closed 1979)
Huntington; Catholic	Huntington	Ramblers		35; Huntington	1971	Independents	1985	Independents none (school closed)
Kewanna	Kewanna	Indians		25; Fulton	1971	Independents (TVAC 1968)	1981	none (consolidated into Caston)
Wawassee Prep	Syracuse	Lakers		50; Marshall	1971	Independents (opened 1968)	1975	none (school closed)
White's	Wabash	Warriors		85; Wabash	1971	Independents	2010	Independents (left IHSAA 2011)
Marion; Bennett	Marion	Trojans		27; Grant	1973		1993	Independents none (school closed)
Fort Wayne; Keystone	Fort Wayne	Eagles		02; Allen	1982	joined IHSAA	2010	none (school closed)
Howe	Howe	Wildcats		44; La Grange	1984	Independents (NECC 1980)	2010	Independents
Fort Wayne; Canterbury	Fort Wayne	Cavaliers		2 Allen	1985		2002	Independents
Lakeview; Christian	Marion	Lions		27; Grant	1988		2010	Independents
Lakewood Park; Christian	Auburn	Panthers		17; Dekalb	1997	ACSI (joined IHSAA 2000)	2009	Independents

== Resources ==
- IHSAA Conferences
- IHSAA Directory
- Fort Wayne Christian All-Time Team Results
