= Clay City Junior-Senior High School =

Public high school in Indiana, United States

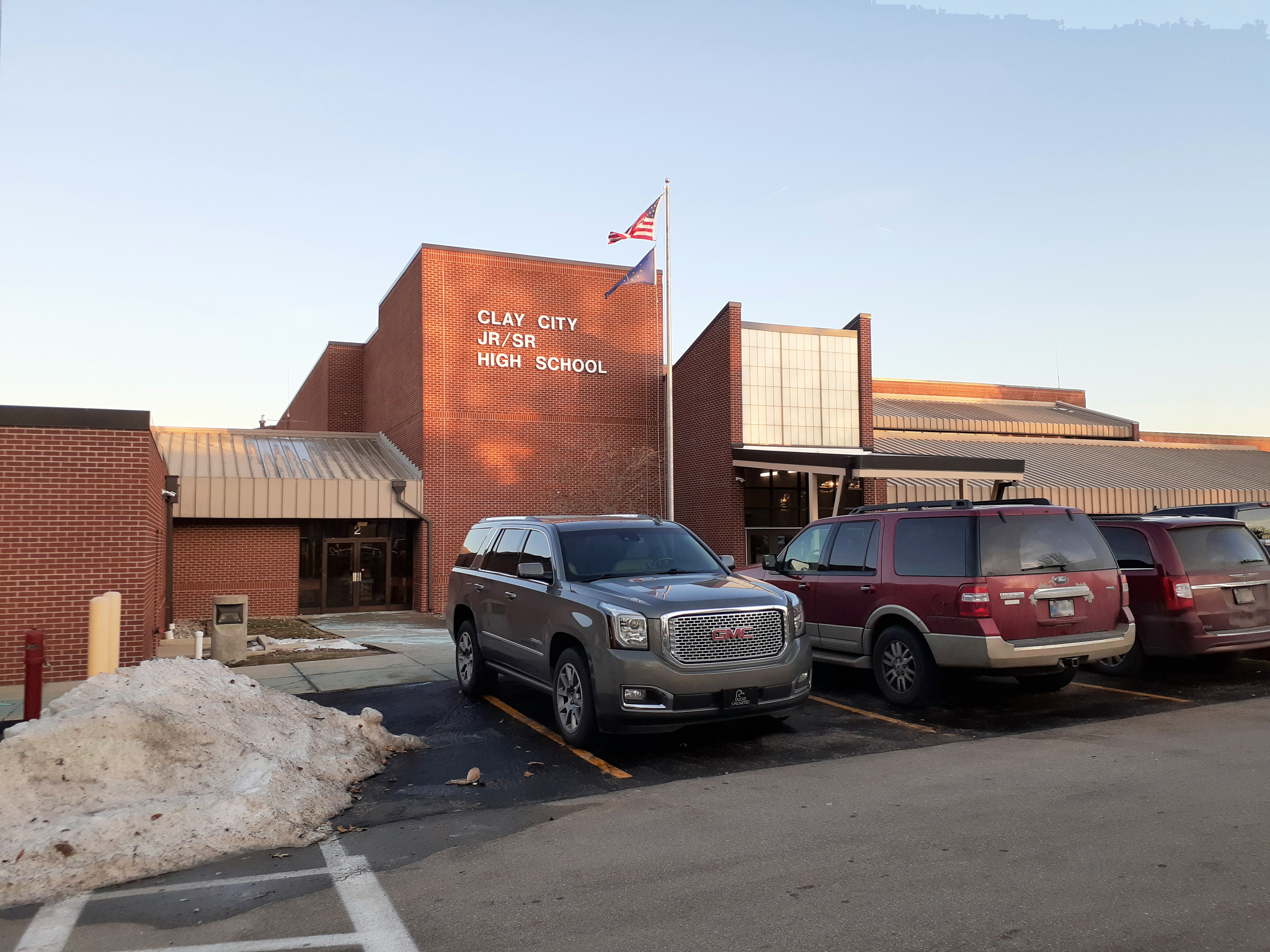

Location
- 601 Lankford Street; Clay City, Clay County, Indiana 47841; United States; 39.279496°N 87.109975°W

Information
- Type: Public high school
- School district: Clay Community Schools
- Principal: Michael Owens
- Teaching staff: 28.24(on an FTE basis)
- Grades: 7–12
- Enrollment: 350 (2023–2024)
- Student to teacher ratio: 12.39
- Color
- Team name: Eels
- Website: cchs.clay.k12.in.us

Clay City Junior-Senior High School is a middle school and high school located in Clay City, Indiana, United States.

== See also ==
- List of high schools in Indiana
- Southwestern Indiana Conference
- Clay City, Indiana
