= Clinton Central High School =

Clinton Central Junior-Senior High School

Location
- 815 IN-29; Michigantown, Clinton County, Indiana 46057; United States
- Coordinates: 40.297813°N 86.391194°W

Information
- Type: Public high school
- Established: 1959
- School district: Clinton Central School Corporation
- Superintendent: Levi Yowell
- Principal: Jason Lake
- Faculty: 30.50 (on an FTE basis))
- Grades: 7–12
- Enrollment: 375 (2024–2025)
- Student to teacher ratio: 12.30
- Color
- Fight song: Go Northwestern Go
- Athletics: Football, cross county, volleyball, swimming, wrestling, basketball, golf, softball, baseball, track and field
- Athletics conference: Hoosier Heartland
- Team name: Bulldogs
- Website: Official Website

Clinton Central Junior-Senior High School is a middle school and high school located in Michigantown, Indiana.

== See also ==
- List of high schools in Indiana
- Hoosier Heartland Conference
