= Clinton Prairie High School =

Public high school in Frankfort, Indiana, United States

Clinton Prairie Junior-Senior High School

Location
- 2400 South County Road 450 West; Frankfort, Clinton County, Indiana 46041; United States
- Coordinates: 40.250815°N 86.591631°W

Information
- Type: Public high school
- Motto: "Be Gopher Great!"
- School district: Clinton Prairie School Corporation
- Superintendent: Scott Miller
- Principal: Kirsten Clark
- Faculty: 38.00
- Grades: 7-12
- Enrollment: 469 (2023–2024)
- Student to teacher ratio: 12.34
- Color
- Team name: Gophers
- Website: Official Website

Clinton Prairie Junior-Senior High School is a middle school and high school located in Frankfort, Indiana.

== Athletics ==
=== Women's Basketball ===
In 1999, the Clinton Prairie women's basketball team defeated New Washington to claim the Women's Basketball Class A Indiana State championship. The victory would be the first women's basketball championship for the school.

== See also ==
- List of high schools in Indiana
- Hoosier Heartland Conference
- Frankfort, Indiana
