= Perry Central Junior-Senior High School =

Location
- 18677 Old SR 37; Leopold, Indiana 47551; United States; 38.111107°N 86.604096°W

Information
- Type: Early college high school
- Established: 1962
- School district: Perry Central Community Schools Corporation
- Principal: Jody French
- Faculty: 44.50 (FTE)
- Grades: 7–12
- Enrollment: 558 (2023–24)
- Student to teacher ratio: 12.54
- Color
- Athletics conference: Patoka Lake Conference
- Team name: Commodores
- Rivals: Tell City High School
- Website: www.pccs.k12.in.us/o/pccs/page/earlycollege

Perry Central Junior-Senior High School is a public early college high school located in Leopold, Indiana, United States.

It formed in 1962 as a consolidation of Leopold High School, Oil Township High School, and Tobinsport High School. Initially the Oil Township High building was used for the consolidated school. The current facility opened in 1966.

== See also ==
- List of high schools in Indiana
