= Union City Community High School =

Union City Community Junior-Senior High School

Location
- 603 North Walnut Street; Union City, Indiana 47390; United States
- 40°12′15″N 84°48′54″W

Information
- Type: Public high school
- School district: Randolph Eastern School Corporation
- Principal: Jason Loomis
- Teaching staff: 33.50 (on an FTE basis)
- Grades: 7-12
- Enrollment: 370 (2023-2024)
- Student to teacher ratio: 11.04
- Color
- Athletics conference: Tri-Eastern
- Team name: Indians
- Website: www.resc.k12.in.us/o/ucjshs

Union City Community Junior-Senior High School is a public high school located in Union City, Indiana.

== History ==
Union City's first high school class was organized in 1872, with 13 students, and held its first graduation in 1876, with four graduates. A new Union City High School building was constructed at the northeast corner of Oak and Walnut Streets in 1891. That structure was destroyed by fire in 1919, and its replacement served as the high school's building until 1957 (when the new building was built), and then as a middle school until 2003, reopening as the senior apartment complex "Hoosier Place" in 2006. The current high school building is north of the prior location, at 603 North Walnut Street.

The current high school building was built in 1957, and 1958 saw the first graduation after consolidation with Wayne School.

== Athletics ==
Union City Community Junior-Senior High School's athletic teams are known as the Indians and compete in the Tri-Eastern Conference. The school offers a wide range of athletics including:

- Baseball
- Basketball
- Cheerleading
- Cross Country
- Dance
- Football
- Golf
- Softball
- Tennis
- Track and field
- Volleyball
- Wrestling

== See also ==
- List of high schools in Indiana
