= White River Valley High School =

White River Valley Junior-Senior High School
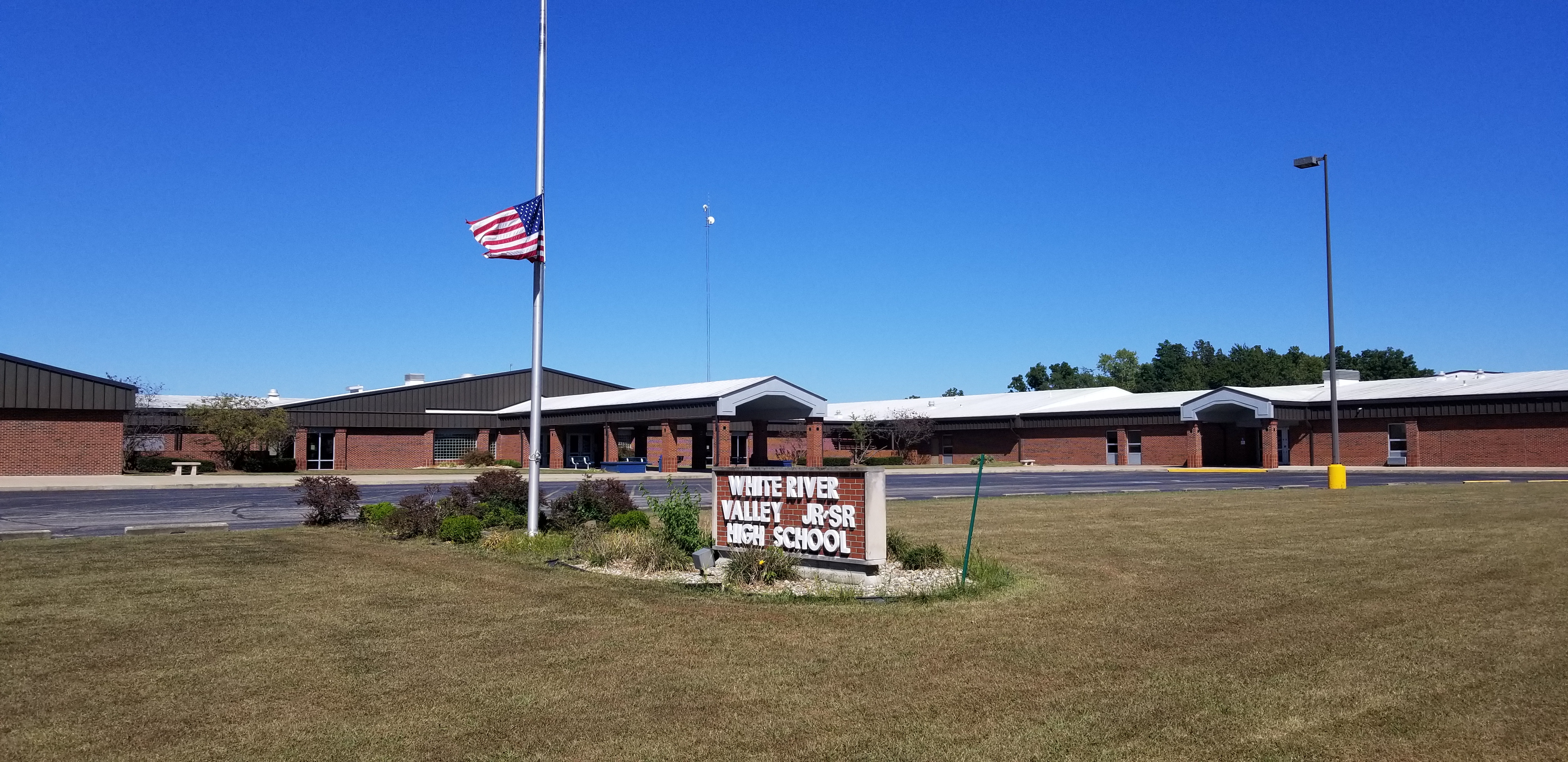

Location
- 5644 West State Road 54; Switz City, Greene County, Indiana 47465; United States
- Coordinates: 39.035303°N 87.046636°W

Information
- Type: Public high school
- School district: White River Valley School District
- Principal: Michael Fellow
- Teaching staff: 18.00 (FTE)
- Grades: 9-12
- Enrollment: 209 (2023-24)
- Student to teacher ratio: 11.61
- Color
- Team name: Wolverines
- Rivals: Bloomfield Cardinals
- Website: Official Website

White River Valley High School is a high school located in Switz City, Indiana.

== Notable students ==
- Matthew Graves, college basketball coach

== See also ==
- List of high schools in Indiana
