= Dixie-Monon Conference =

Athletic conference in Indiana, US

The Dixie-Monon Athletic Conference was an IHSAA-sanctioned conference in Southern Indiana. The conference was formed as a merger between the Dixie and Southern Monon conferences in 1965, and by its third year had grown to 12 members. However, soon after, consolidation started chipping away at the conference, and it ended in 1974, as only three schools were left.

== Membership ==
School	Location	Mascot	Colors	County	Year joined	Previous conference	Year left	Conference joined
Borden	Borden	Braves		10; Clark	1965	Southern Monon	1971	Lost River
Crothersville^{1}	Crothersville	Tigers		36; Jackson	1965	Dixie/ Jackson County	1969	Mid-Hoosier
Deputy	Deputy	Warriors		39; Jefferson	1965	Dixie	1968	none (consolidated into Madison
Eastern (Pekin)	New Pekin	Musketeers		88; Washington	1965	Southern Monon	1971	Lost River
Fayetteville^{2}	Fayetteville	Lions		47; Lawrence	1965	Lawrence County/ Southern Monon	1974	none (consolidated into Bedford-North Lawrence)
Henryville	Henryville	Hornets		10; Clark	1965	Dixie	1971	Lost River
Medora^{1}	Medora	Hornets		36; Jackson	1965	Jackson County/ Southern Monon	1974	Independents (TRAC 1979)
New; Washington	New; Washington	Mustangs		10; Clark	1965	Dixie	1974	Southern
Orleans	Orleans	Bulldogs		59; Orange	1965	Southern Monon	1971	Lost River
Tunnelton^{2}	Tunnelton	Indians		47; Lawrence	1965	Lawrence County/ Southern Monon	1974	none (consolidated into Bedford-North Lawrence)
West Washington	Campbellsburg	Senators		88; Washington	1965	Southern Monon	1971	Lost River
Clear Spring	Clear Spring	Purple Warriors		36; Jackson	1967	Jackson County	1969	none (consolidated into Brownstown Central
Heltonville	Heltonville	Blue Jackets		47; Lawrence	1970	Lawrence County	1974	none (consolidated into Bedford-North Lawrence)

1. Played concurrently in DMC and JCC 1965–67.
2. Played concurrently in DMC and LCC 1965–70.

== Resources ==
- Old Dixie Conference
