= Southern Monon Conference =

The Southern Monon Conference was an IHSAA-sanctioned conference in Southern Indiana. The conference was named after the two railroad lines the four founding schools were located along: the Southern (Milltown) and Monon (Borden, Campbellsburg, and Pekin). The conference doubled in size in its second year, yet had a large amount of turnover in its existence, The conference ended in 1965, when it merged with the Dixie Athletic Conference to form the Dixie-Monon Conference (Milltown left the league in 1959, ending the presence of the Southern Railroad its footprint).

== Membership ==
School	Location	Mascot	Colors	County	Year joined	Previous conference	Year left	Conference joined
Borden	Borden	Braves		10; Clark	1957	Clark County	1965	Dixie-Monon
Campbellsburg^{1}	Campbellsburg	Warriors		88; Washington	1957	Washington County	1963	none (consolidated into West Washington)
Milltown^{2}	Milltown	Millers		13; Crawford	1957	Crawford County	1959	Blue River
Pekin^{1}	New Pekin	Musketeers		88; Washington	1957	Washington County	1965	Dixie-Monon
Henryville	Henryville	Hornets		10; Clark	1958	Clark County	1959	Independents (Dixie in 1961)
New; Washington	New; Washington	Mustangs		10; Clark	1958	Clark County	1959	Independents (Dixie in 1961)
Hardinsburg	Hardinsburg	Bearcats		88; Washington	1958	Washington County	1963	none (consolidated into West Washington)
Tunnelton^{3}	Tunnelton	Indians		47; Lawrence	1958	Lawrence County	1965	Dixie-Monon
Fayetteville^{3}	Fayetteville	Lions		47; Lawrence	1959	Lawrence County	1965	Dixie-Monon
Medora^{4}	Medora	Hornets		36; Jackson	1959	Jackson County	1965	Dixie-Monon
Williams^{3}	Williams	Bulldogs		47; Lawrence	1959	Lawrence County	1963	none (consolidated into Bedford
Orleans	Orleans	Bulldogs		59; Orange	1963	Independents (previous SE Indiana 1958)	1965	Dixie-Monon
West Washington	Campbellsburg	Senators		88; Washington	1963	none (new school)	1965	Dixie-Monon

1. Played concurrently in SMC and WCC 1957–58.
2. Played concurrently in SMC and CCC 1957–59.
3. Played concurrently in SMC and LCC throughout SMC tenure.
4. Played concurrently in SMC and JCC 1959–65.
