= Lost River Athletic Conference =

The Lost River Athletic Conference was a short-lived IHSAA-sanctioned conference in southern Indiana, formed in 1971. Member schools hailed from Clark, Dubois, Martin, Orange, and Washington counties. Membership was never stable in its six-year span, and multiple schools held dual membership in other conferences.

School	Location	Mascot	Colors	County	Year joined	Previous conference	Year left	Conference joined
Borden^{1}	Borden	Braves		10; Clark	1971	Dixie-Monon	1975	Southern
Eastern (Pekin)^{2}	New Pekin	Musketeers		88; Washington	1971	Dixie-Monon	1977	Southern
Henryville	Henryville	Hornets		10; Clark	1971	Dixie-Monon	1977	Southern
Orleans	Orleans	Bulldogs		59; Orange	1971	Dixie-Monon	1977	Independents (PLC in 1979)
Shoals^{3}	Shoals	Jug Rox		51; Martin	1971	Southwestern Indiana	1974	Southwestern Indiana
West; Washington	Campbellsburg	Senators		88; Washington	1971	Dixie-Monon	1977	Independents (PLC in 1979)
Northeast; Dubois	Dubois	Jeeps		19; Dubois	1972	Patoka Valley	1977	Blue Chip

1. Borden played concurrently in the LRAC and SAC for the 1974–75 season.
2. Eastern played in the LRAC and SAC concurrently for the 1975–76 and 1976–77 seasons.
3. Shoals had dual membership in the LRAC and SWIAC for their entire duration in the conference.
