= Dixie Athletic Conference =

The Dixie Athletic Conference was a short-lived IHSAA-sanctioned conference in Southern Indiana. The conference was formed in 1961 by smaller, far-flung schools. In 1965, left with only four schools, it merged with the Southern Monon Conference to form the Dixie-Monon Conference.

== Membership ==
| School | Location | Mascot | Colors | County | Year joined | Previous conference | Year left | Conference joined |
|---|---|---|---|---|---|---|---|---|
| Crothersville^{1} | Crothersville | Tigers | | 36; Jackson | 1961 | Jackson County | 1965 | Dixie-Monon |
| Deputy | Deputy | Warriors | | 39; Jefferson | 1961 | Tri-County | 1965 | Dixie-Monon |
| Hauser | Hope | Jets | | 03; Bartholomew | 1961 | Bartholomew- Shelby County | 1964 | Mid-Hoosier |
| Henryville | Henryville | Hornets | | 10; Clark | 1961 | Independents (SMC 1959) | 1965 | Dixie-Monon |
| New; Washington | New; Washington | Mustangs | | 10; Clark | 1961 | Independents (SMC 1959) | 1965 | Dixie-Monon |
| Vernon | Vernon | Blue Devils | | 40; Jennings | 1961 | Tri-County | 1964 | none (consolidated into North Vernon) |
| Cortland^{1} | Cortland | Eagles | | 36; Jackson | 1962 | Jackson County | 1965 | none (consolidated into Seymour) |

1. Played concurrently in DCC and JCC throughout membership in Dixie.
