= List of Indiana state historical markers in Clark County =

Location of Clark County in Indiana

This is a list of the Indiana state historical markers in Clark County.

This is intended to be a complete list of the official state historical markers placed in Clark County, Indiana, United States by the Indiana Historical Bureau. The locations of the historical markers and their latitude and longitude coordinates are included below when available, along with their names, years of placement, and topics as recorded by the Historical Bureau. There are 17 historical markers located in Clark County.

== Historical markers ==
Marker title	Image	Year placed	Location	Topics
Clarksville		1940s	Junction of Clark Boulevard and Harrison Avenue on a landscaped median in Clarksville; 38°17′12″N 85°45′47.4″W	Early Settlement and Exploration, Historic District, Neighborhoods, and Towns
Civil War Hospital		1962	Northeastern lawn of 301 Park Place at Crestview, at the Holt Masonic Orphan's Home in the Port Fulton neighborhood of Jeffersonville; 38°16′56″N 85°43′16″W	Science, Medicine, and Inventions, Military
General Jefferson C. Davis 1828-1879		1963	Junction of U.S. Route 31 and Court Street in Memphis; 38°29′0″N 85°45′46.6″W	Military
Grave of Jonathan Jennings 1784-1834 (two blocks east)		1966	Market Street/State Road 3 at Pleasant Street in Charlestown; 38°26′46″N 85°39′53″W	Politics
Birthplace and Childhood Home of Col. Harland Sanders		1987	Southern side of State Road 160 at Exit 16 from northbound Interstate 65 at Henryville; 38°32′24″N 85°46′34″W	Business, Industry, and Labor
Lewis and Clark Expedition 1803-1806		1991	Falls of the Ohio State Park near the George Rogers Clark Homesite at 1200 S. Harrison Street in Clarksville; 38°17′13″N 85°46′34″W	Early Settlement and Exploration
Clark State Forest		1992	U.S. Route 31 within Clark State Forest, 100 yards past the entrance on the southern side of a forest road north of Henryville; 38°33′11″N 85°46′0″W	Nature and Natural Disasters, Science, Medicine, and Inventions
Borden Institute Site		1995	301 West Street at a school drive, near Borden and New Providence; 38°28′10″N 85°56′48″W	Education, Agriculture
Fern Grove and Rose Island Resorts		1998	State Road 62 at the entrance to Charlestown State Park near Charlestown; 38°26′58″N 85°38′45″W	Arts and Culture, Nature and Natural Disasters, Military
Tunnel Mill		2001	3709 Tunnel Mill Road near Charlestown; 38°28′54″N 85°37′34″W	Business, Industry, and Labor, Nature and Natural Disasters
Indiana State Prison		2006	1400 block of S. Clark Boulevard in Clarksville; 38°16′28.2″N 85°45′8″W	Government Institutions, Buildings and Architecture, Women
Hannah Toliver		2008	Junction of Pearl Street and Riverside Drive in Jeffersonville; 38°16′8″N 85°44′23″W	[none]
John Work Home and Mill		2012	3709 Tunnel Mill Road, Charlestown; 38°28′52″N 85°37′32″W	Early Settlement; Business, Industry and Labor; Buildings and Architecture
WWII Army Ammunition Plant		2017	Along Corporate Drive, just southeast of the River Ridge Development Authority at 300 Corporate Drive, Utica	Business, Industry, and Labor; Military; Buildings and Architecture
Sterilization & Eugenics		2017	1410 S Clark Blvd, Clarksville	
Mary Garrett Hay		2021	Charlestown City Square, intersection of Main St. and Short St., Charlestown	
"Colonel" Harland Sanders		2022	Across the street from 6012 Zollman Rd., Henryville; 38°32′48″N 85°42′37″W	Business, Industry, & Labor

== See also ==
- List of Indiana state historical markers
- National Register of Historic Places listings in Clark County, Indiana
