= Southern Athletic Conference of Indiana =

High School athletic conference in Indiana, United States

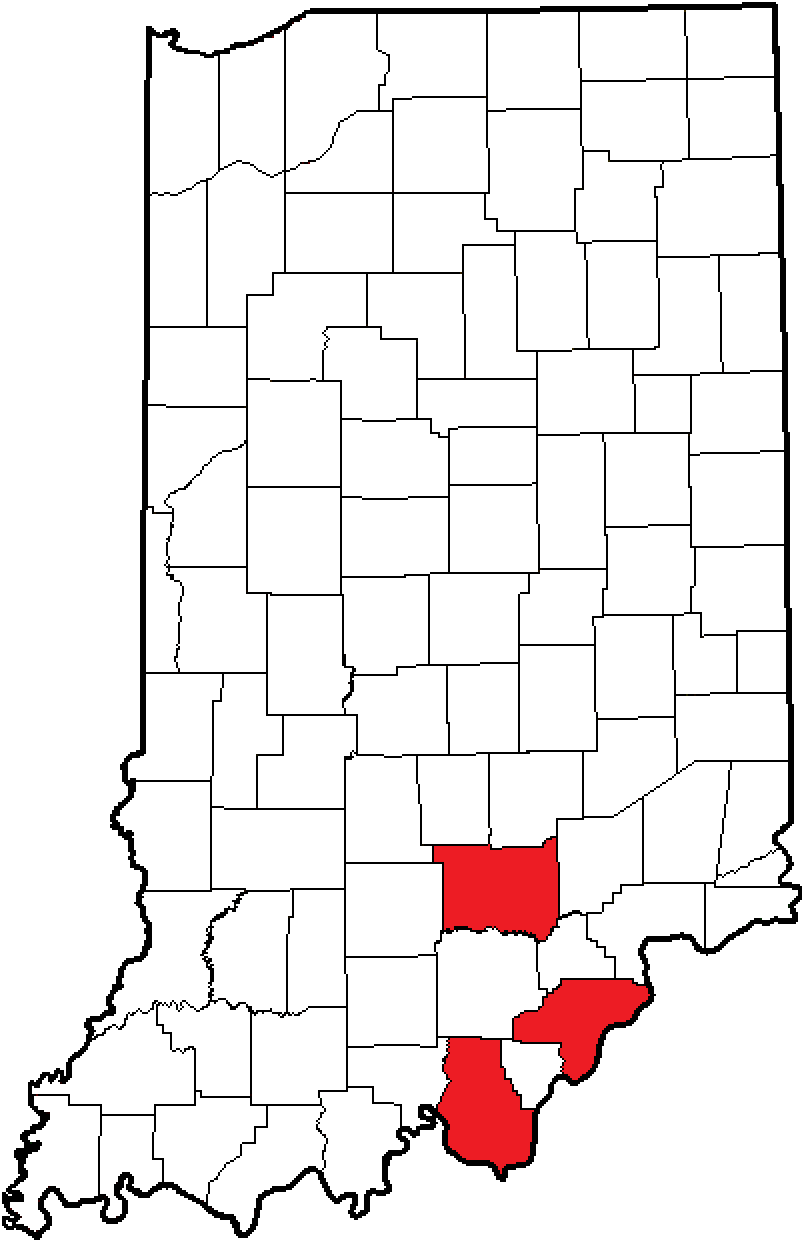
Location of the Southern Athletic Conference within Indiana

The Southern Athletic Conference is an IHSAA-sanctioned athletic located within Clark, Harrison, and Jackson Counties in South Central Indiana. The conference began in 1974 as a four school conference, and grew to eight members within five years as other local conferences disbanded. The conference has lost two schools in the years since; both left for the Mid-Southern Conference. The Southern also had schools that had dual membership in other conferences at the same time, though by 1986, all of these schools entered full membership with a sole conference.

== Membership ==
School	Location	Mascot	Colors	Enrollment	IHSAA Class	County	Year joined	Previous conference
Borden*	Borden	Braves		228	A	10; Clark	1974	Lost River
Crothersville*	Crothersville	Tigers		180	A	36; Jackson	1974	Mid-Hoosier
Henryville	Henryville	Hornets		347	AA	10; Clark	1977	Lost River
Lanesville	Lanesville	Eagles		237	A	31; Harrison	1979	Blue River
New; Washington	New; Washington	Mustangs		273	A	10; Clark	1974	Dixie-Monon
South Central (Elizabeth)	Elizabeth	Rebels		277	A	31; Harrison	1979	Blue River

- Borden played in both the SAC and the LRC for the 1974–75 season before leaving the LRC in 1975. Crothersville played in both the SAC and the MHC from 1974 to 1983.

=== Future members ===
School	Location	Mascot	Colors	County	Year joining	Previous conference
Clarksville	Clarksville	Generals		10; Clark	2025	Independent
Eastern (Pekin)	New Pekin	Musketeers		88; Washington	2025	Mid-Southern

== Former members ==
School	Location	Mascot	Colors	County	Year joined	Previous conference	Year left	Conference joined
Austin*	Austin	Eagles		72; Scott	1974	Mid-Southern	1986	Mid-Southern
Eastern (Pekin)*	New Pekin	Musketeers		88; Washington	1975	Lost River	2003	Mid-Southern

- Austin played concurrently in the SAC and MSC during its entire tenure in the Southern. Eastern had dual membership in the SAC and LRC from 1975 to 1977, when the LRC disbanded.

== Resources ==
- IHSAA Conferences
- IHSAA Directory
