= Patoka Lake Conference =

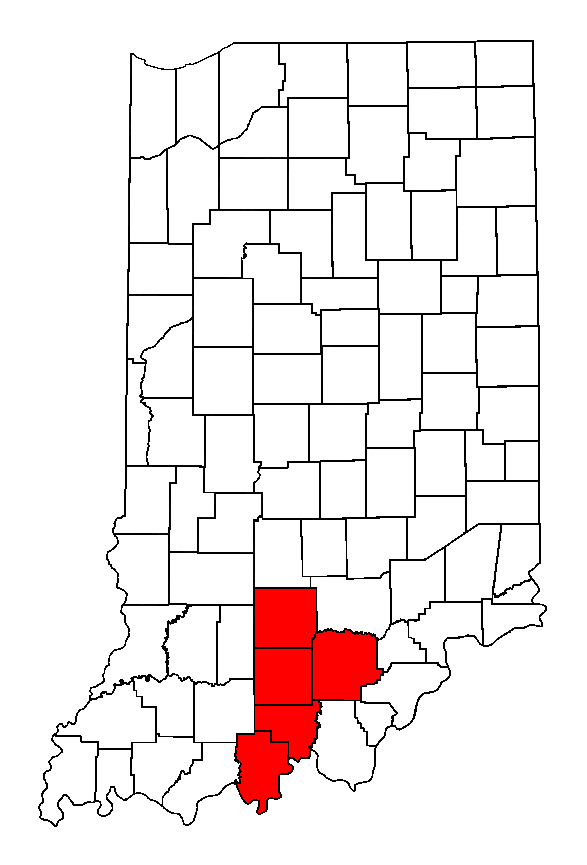
Location of PLC members in Indiana

The Patoka Lake Athletic Conference is a high school athletic conference in southern Indiana. The conferences members are small high schools located in Crawford, Lawrence, Orange, Perry, and Washington counties. The conference was formed in 1979, and has only had one change in membership history, when member Crawford County added football in 2007 to take football membership to six (Orleans does not field a football team).

== Member schools ==
| School | Location | Mascot | Colors | Enrollment 2023–24 | IHSAA Class | County | Gym sizes | Previous conference |
|---|---|---|---|---|---|---|---|---|
| Crawford; County | Marengo | Wolfpack | | 379 | AA | 13; Crawford | 4000 | Blue River |
| Mitchell | Mitchell | Bluejackets | | 430 | AA | 47; Lawrence | 2700 | Blue Chip |
| Orleans | Orleans | Bulldogs | | 262 | A | 59; Orange | 2500 | Independents (LRAC in 1977) |
| Paoli | Paoli | Rams | | 396 | AA | 59; Orange | 4500 | Mid-Southern* |
| Perry; Central | Leopold | Commodores | | 377 | AA | 62; Perry | 1418 | Blue River |
| Springs; Valley | French Lick | Blackhawks | | 266 | A | 59; Orange | 2700 | Blue Chip |
| West; Washington | Campbellsburg | Senators | | 277 | A | 88; Washington | 2096 | Independents (LRAC in 1977) |

- Paoli played in both the PLAC and MSC from 1979 until 1985.

== Neighboring conferences ==
- Blue Chip Conference
- Pocket Athletic Conference
- Southwestern Indiana Athletic Conference
- Southwest Seven Football Conference
