= 2012 Henryville tornado =

2012 tornado in Indiana and Kentucky, US

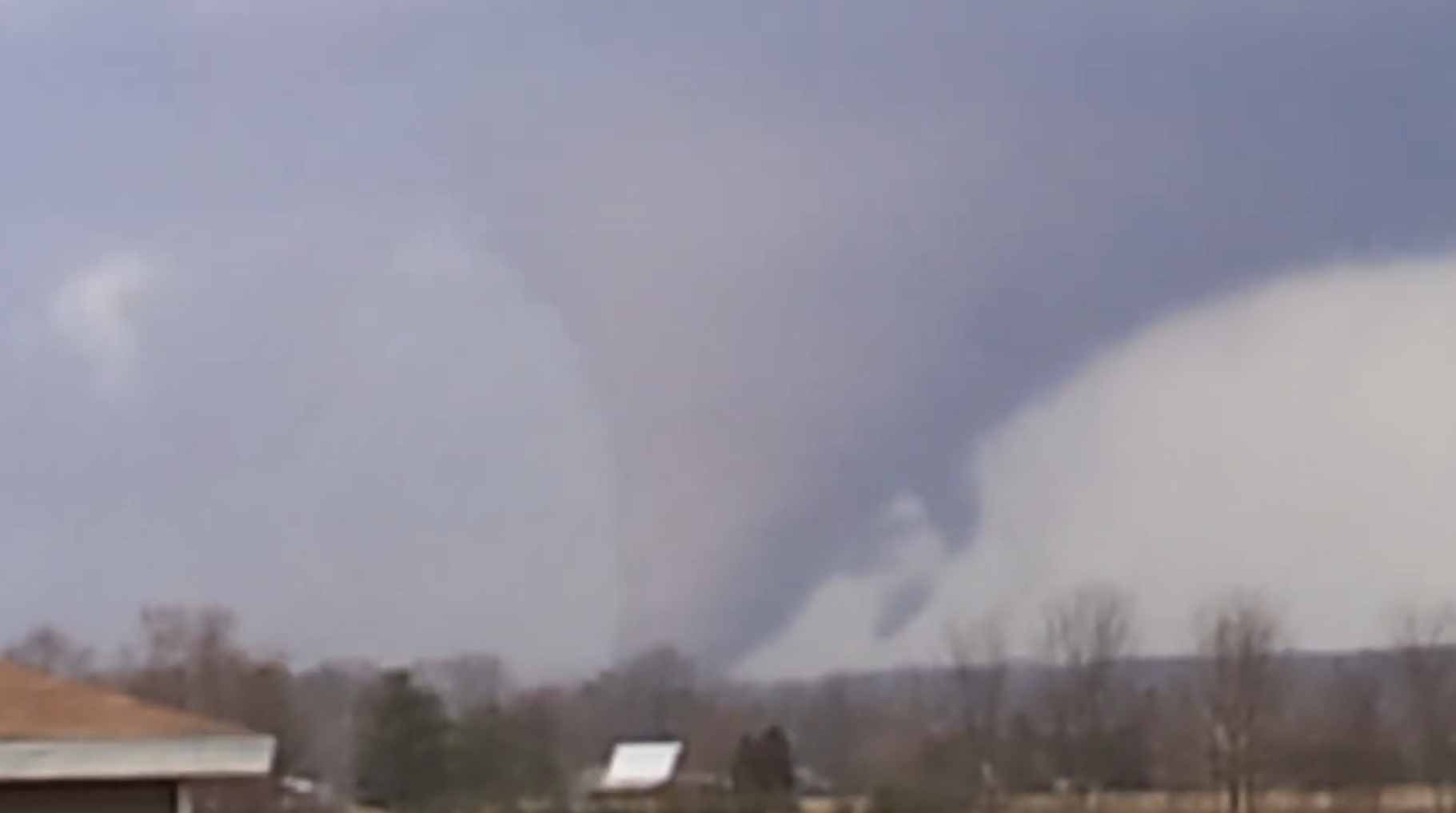
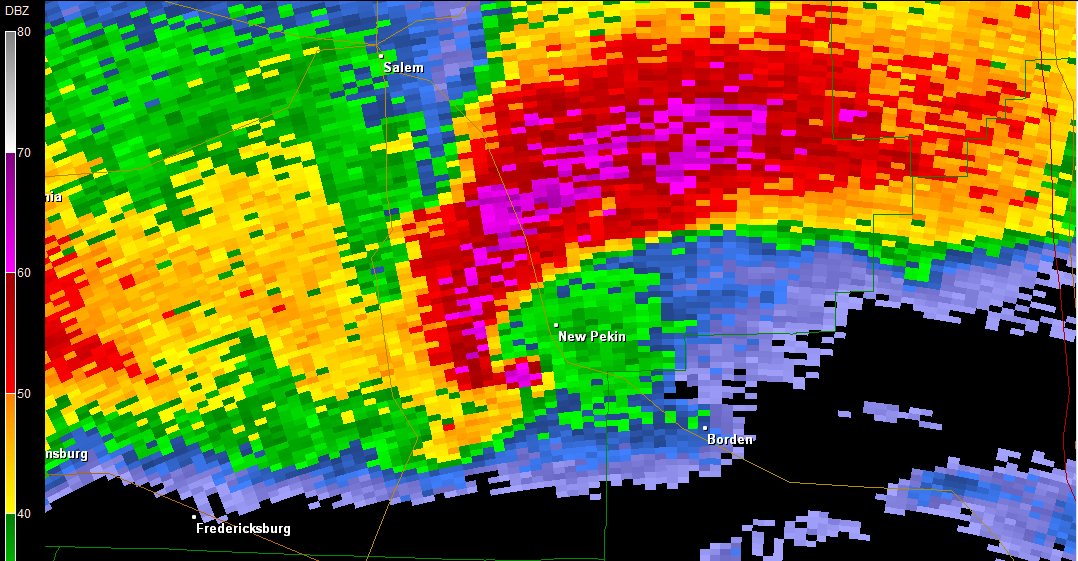
- Top to bottom: View of the tornado from Memphis, Indiana. NEXRAD radar showing the Henryville tornado southwest of New Pekin, depicting a debris ball on base reflectivity.

Meteorological history
- Formed: March 2, 2012, 2:50 p.m. EST (UTC−05:00)
- Dissipated: March 2, 2012, 3:39 p.m. EST (UTC−05:00)
- Duration: 49 minutes

EF4 tornado
- on the Enhanced Fujita scale
- Max width: 800 yards (0.45 mi; 0.73 km)
- Path length: 46.60 miles (75.00 km)
- Highest winds: 175 mph (282 km/h)

Overall effects
- Fatalities: 11 Fatality estimates: 11 - Per the National Weather Service; 14 – Per WLKY; "At least 15" – Per CBS News
- Injuries: Unknown, likely many
- Damage: $58.575 million (2012 USD)
- Areas affected: Fredericksburg, New Pekin, Henryville, Marysville, located in the state of Indiana
- Part of the Tornado outbreak of March 2–3, 2012 and Tornadoes of 2012

In the afternoon hours of March 2, 2012, a deadly and destructive tornado moved through several communities in the states of Indiana and Kentucky, killing at least 11 people. The tornado was part of a larger severe weather outbreak in March 2012; the tornado was the deadliest of the outbreak. The tornado devastated the towns of New Pekin, Marysville and Henryville, Indiana, leaving damages totaling in excess of $58 million (2012 USD) in its wake. The National Weather Service determined that the tornado had peak wind speeds of 175 miles per hour (282 km/h), garnering it an EF4 rating on the Enhanced Fujita scale. The EF4 rating of the tornado was something that was brought into question in a National Weather Service publication in 2022, which noted the possibility of potential EF5 damage.

== Meteorological synopsis ==
On March 1, 2012, a moderate risk of severe weather was issued by the Storm Prediction Center for March 2 a day in advance for a large area from near Tuscaloosa, Alabama to Dayton, Ohio as an intense low-pressure area tracked across the region in a very high shear and convective instability environment. The severe weather agency noted that the environment, consisting of high convective available potential energy (CAPE), favorable thermodynamics, and a warm front that was expected to destabilize the atmosphere across portions of Mississippi, Tennessee, and Ohio Valleys, would support an environment for intense tornadoes across the moderate risk area. Parts of the risk area were upgraded to a high risk of severe weather, primarily for Middle Tennessee and central Kentucky, which was later extended into central and southern Indiana, as well as southern Ohio. The Storm Prediction Center noted the combination of a destabilizing warm sector, favorable dewpoints, a forcing mechanism, and strong lower-level shear; this would lead to the potential for significant, long-tracked tornadoes.

An evolving line of semi-discrete tornadic supercells across eastern Illinois and western Indiana following the northward lifting of the warm front and a rapidly-strengthening low-pressure area over the central Great Lakes prompted a PDS tornado watch for eastern Illinois and western Indiana, along with southeastern Missouri and western Kentucky; a second PDS tornado watch was issued for eastern Indiana, western Ohio, and central Kentucky as the line moved east.

== Tornado summary ==
=== Formation and track through Washington County ===
The tornado first developed in the southern parts of Fredericksburg, snapping trees at EF1 strength while meandering just south of US 150 and along the Blue Lick River. Moving east-northeast across rural areas, the tornado then caused additional tree damage, uprooting and snapping numerous trees while strengthening. Nearby, the tornado toppled a metal power structure at EF2 strength. Several trees were snapped at EF1 intensity; high-tension wires were downed as well. After traveling over a ridge and SR 135, the tornado blew large chunks of 5–6 inches (13–15 cm)-thick asphalt off the road and tossed them 30 yards (27 m) away, while traveling at a relatively fast speed. Substantial tree damage was noted east of SR 135; damage there was rated at EF3 intensity with 150 miles per hour (240 km/h) winds. Coincidentally, the damage path began to widen, expanding to 200 yards (180 m).

Tree and structural damage was widespread northeast of SR 135 as the tornado crossed Trainer Lane and then SR 335 to Robbs Lane. The width of observable damage increased to 1/4–1/3 mile (0.40–0.54 km). Countless trees were snapped and uprooted. The tornado retained high-end EF2 and low-end EF3 intensity in this area, with estimated wind speeds of 120–150 miles per hour (190–240 km/h).

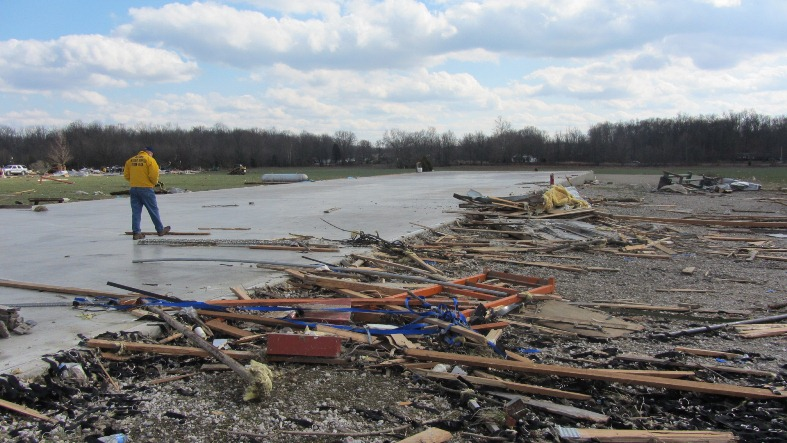
A man walking on top of a slabbed building foundation on East Old Pekin Road near New Pekin

The tornado crossed SR 60 just south of New Pekin. Immediately east of the highway, structural damage produced by the tornado was observed. A well-constructed factory building owned by Airgo Industries was obliterated; the concrete the foundation that the building previously sat atop was visible. Numerous anchoring bolts that held the structure down were bent in the direction of the storm. Debris from the factory building was found 0.5 miles (0.80 km) to 0.75 miles (1.21 km) away. Large power poles were snapped and another metal outbuilding on the right periphery of the damage path had sheeting pulled off the back of the building apparently from the force of the inbound winds into the tornado. Five people in this area were killed, all in the same mobile home. A toddler who lived in the mobile home was tossed by the tornado and landed in a field nearby, initially surviving the ordeal; she died in a hospital shortly after the tornado. At this location just east of SR 60, the tornado reached EF4 intensity with wind speeds estimated to be in the 170 miles per hour (270 km/h) range; the tornado had a width of observed damage that stretched approximately 0.3–0.4 miles (0.48–0.64 km) across.

Damage continued to the east along and south of Hurst Road in extreme southeast Washington County. The tornado crossed into extreme northwest Clark County along and near Daisy Hill Road. In this area, a well-constructed one-story brick house at the top of a small ridge was completely destroyed with no walls standing. Witnesses to the tornado in the area reported that cows were missing and could not be located. They also stated that the tornado looked like a black wall as it approached. A heavy trailer cab was blown from this house to another demolished brick home about 1/4 mile (0.40 km) away. The tornado retained 170 miles per hour (270 km/h) wind speeds in this area.

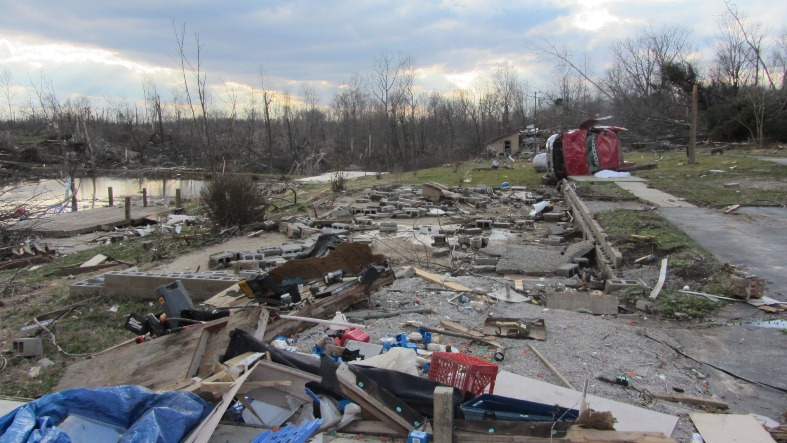
Damage to a vehicle and building from the tornado along Daisy Hill Road

As the tornado re-entered Washington County near the intersection of Daisy Hill Road and Williams Knob Road, widespread damage occurred. This included a home which was totally leveled as well as a couple of anchored down double wide trailers. A car was destroyed and tossed about 100 yards (91 m) in the direction of storm motion from its origin at the home. At one of the destroyed trailers, a Dodge Ram pickup truck was tossed onto its side and destroyed in the opposite direction from the car (i.e., on the left side of the tornado track). Here, EF3 and EF4 damage was determined to have been produced by the tornado, with wind speeds in the 150–170 miles per hour (240–270 km/h) range. There were also snapped trees and structural damage along Whiskey Run Road. The width of the observed damage straddling the Washington/Clark County line was estimated to be 1/3–1/2 mile (0.54–0.80 km) wide, although the width of the most concentrated damage was narrower. The last observed damage in Washington County was near S. Flatwood Road in a wooded area before the tornado entered Clark County.

=== Damage in Clark County ===
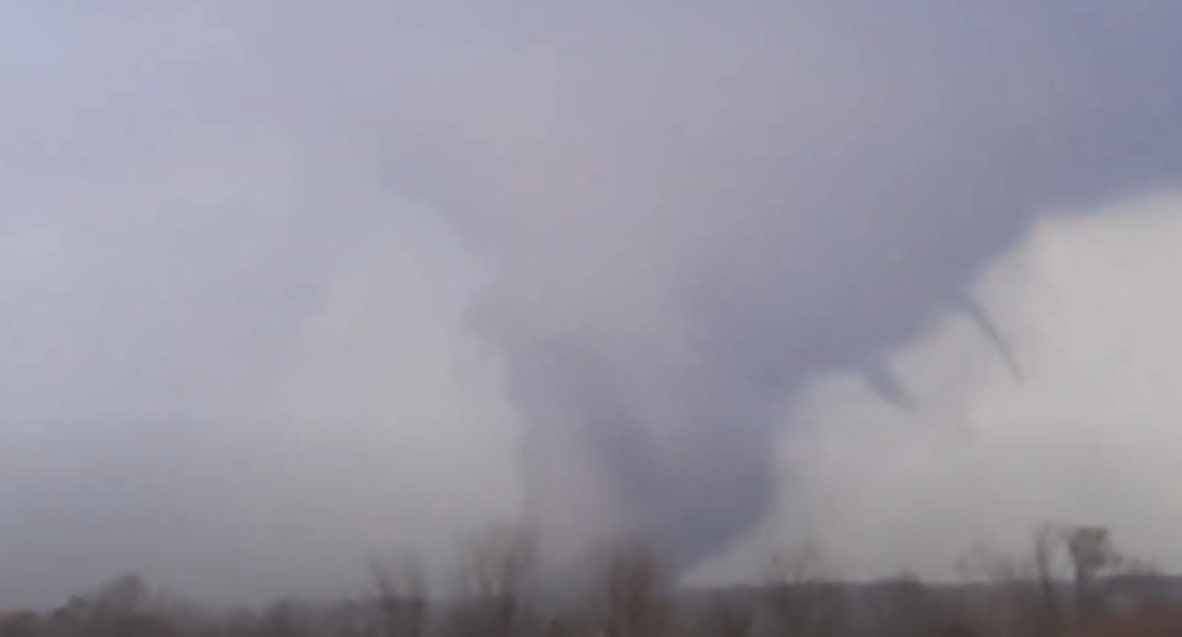
The tornado displaying horizontal vortices near Henryville

National Weather Service office at Louisville, Kentucky issued a tornado emergency for Henryville and other surrounding areas at 3:10 p.m. The tornado continued east-northeast in far northwest Clark County on Dan Gray Road where the tornado leveled many well-built homes and caused extensive tree damage. Damage from the tornado at this location was rated EF4 with estimated wind speeds of 170 miles per hour (270 km/h) and a damage path width of approximately 0.3 miles (0.48 km) across. The tornado moved into far southeast Washington County before reappearing in Clark County. In Clark County, the damage width narrowed to one-quarter mile as the tornado crossed Pixley Knob Road and decreased to EF2 intensity, with wind speeds of 115–120 miles per hour (185–193 km/h).

Farther east, the tornado intensified again as it destroyed two double wide homes on Speith Road. One family residence on the west side of the road was severely damaged, receiving an EF3 rating; the damage was determined to have been produced by 150 miles per hour (240 km/h) winds. The tornado then crossed I-65, damaging several vehicles and semis and closing the interstate for several hours. Several people were trapped in these vehicles but were later rescued. The tornado continued to strengthen just east of Exit 19 of I-65 in a heavily industrialized area. Here, buildings containing several businesses were severely damaged. A home was destroyed on the east side of North Francke Road. The violent tornado also seriously damaged several homes on the north side of SR 160. Here, the tornado produced horizontal vortices and retained wind speeds estimated to have been as high as 175 miles per hour (282 km/h), the tornado's most intense point.

==== Damage in Henryville ====
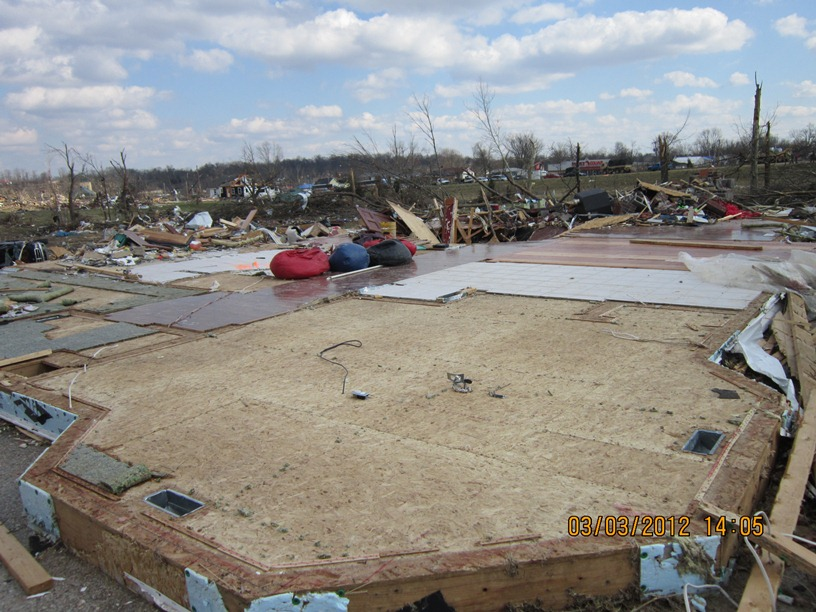
A large home along North Francke Road, in Henryville that was leveled off its foundation at EF4 intensity. Winds were estimated at 175 miles per hour at this location.

The tornado then struck the south buildings of the Henryville middle and high school complex, with severe damage and 170 miles per hour (270 km/h) winds. The middle school experienced the worst damage, where at least three students were sheltering in the school's bathroom. Kyle Lewis, who was sheltering in the middle school when it was hit, stated that "it sounded like a train coming through the building". The cafeteria and gym of the building was completely destroyed and two school buses at the front of the building were ripped off their chassis. There was also extensive structural damage on the east side of Henryville on North Front Street and Pennsylvania Street. A high tension tower and other homes were damaged on Pine Drive. Incredible tree damage also occurred just west of Pine Drive as the tornado traveled up a ridge. In this region, damage from the tornado received an EF3 rating, determined to have been produced by 150 miles per hour (240 km/h) winds that the tornado retained while moving through the area. One of the school buses heavily damaged by the tornado was set aloft and landed next to a restaurant. Nick Shelton, who was one of nine people sheltering in the restaurant when the school bus was dropped nearby, said that "That's probably as close as you're going to come to dying without dying." Debris in the Henryville area was lofted approximately 5,000–8,000 feet (1,500–2,400 m) in the air by the tornado.

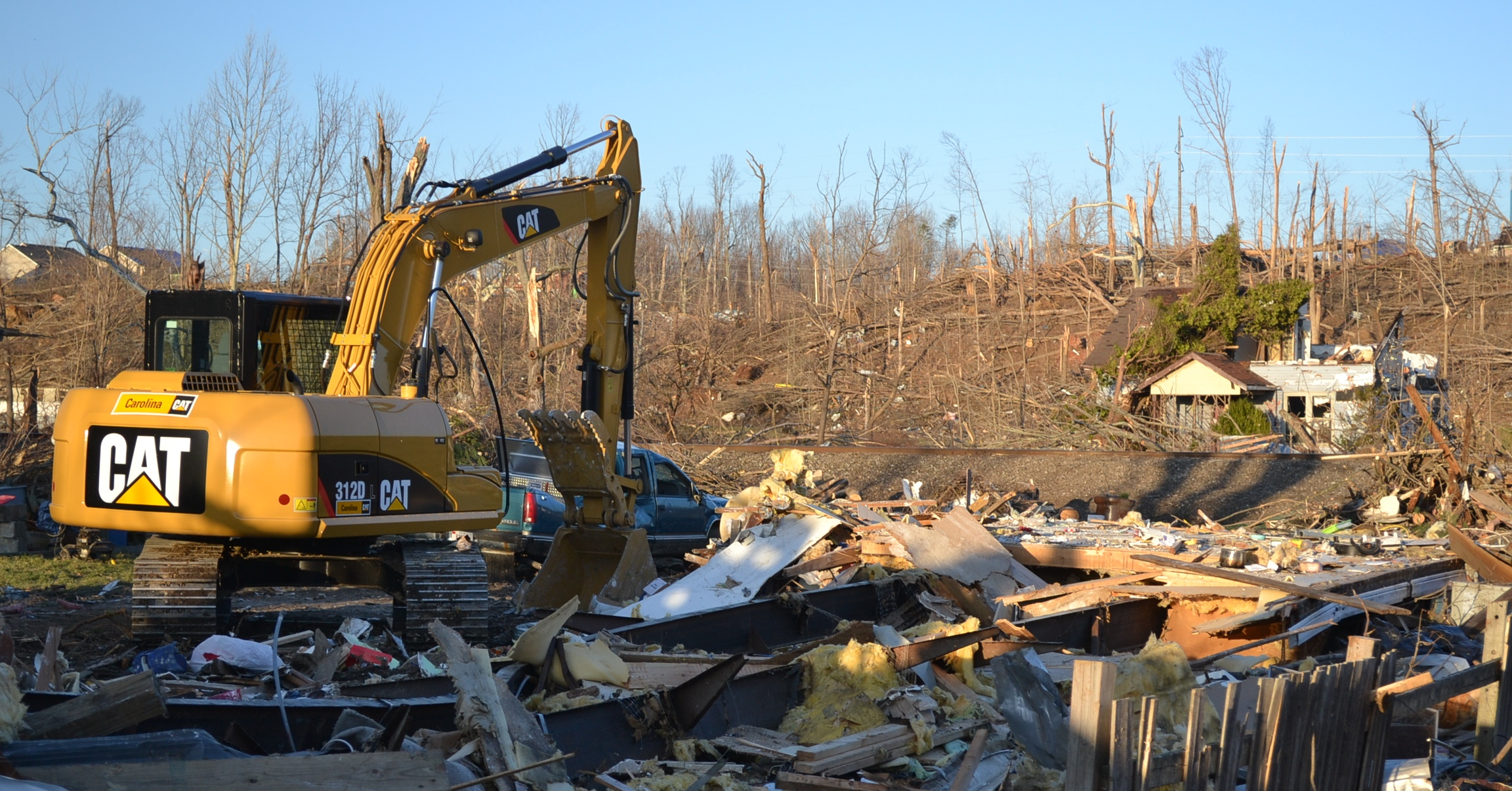
An excavator sits among the rubble of homes in Henryville

On Brownstown Road, many homes were severely damaged especially on the north side of the tornado track with estimated wind speeds of 150 miles per hour (240 km/h). Farther east, there was massive deforestation on the east side of a ridge just west of and along Henryville Otisco Road. Several more homes were severely damaged along this road. One of these homes sustained EF4 damage from the 170 miles per hour (270 km/h) estimated wind speeds of the tornado in the town. One person in Henryville was killed before the tornado left the town devastated. Much of the damage in Henryville received an EF4 rating due to the intensity of the tornado.

The tornado rapidly narrowed to a rope-like structure and ended as an EF1 vortex with 90–95 miles per hour (145–153 km/h) winds and an 80 yards (73 m) wide path. This occurred near the intersection of Blackberry Trail and SR 3. Simultaneously, a new cyclic tornado vortex rapidly formed from the same supercell near Mahan Road and Old State Road 3 immediately southwest of the first tornado. The second tornado began immediately retaining EF1 intensity, damaging a church and a few trees. The vortex quickly intensified to EF3 strength as it crossed the south portion of Marysville, severely damaging several homes. The porch of at least one home in Marysville was shifted off its original resting place by 12 feet (3.7 m).

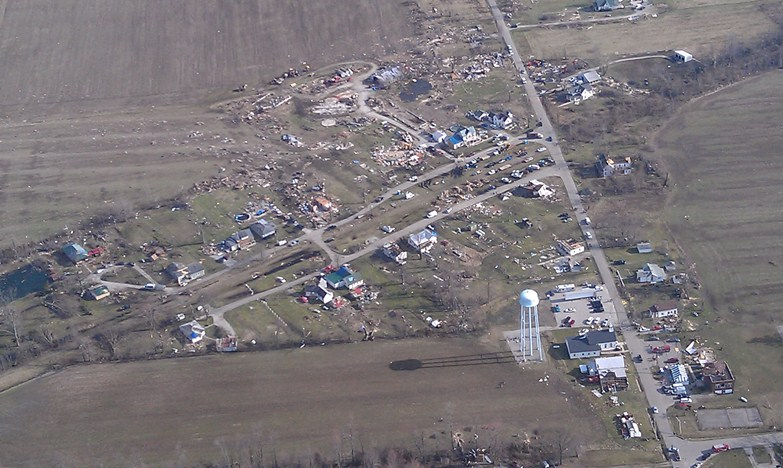
Damage to structures in Marysville produced by the tornado

East of Marysville, another cyclic vortex from the parent storm formed just southwest of the intersection of Nabb New Washington Road and Nabb Marysville Road. This vortex intensified and merged with the primary circulation. The tornado severely damaged or destroyed several houses and double wide mobile homes around the intersection of Nabb New Washington and Nabb Marysville. Debris from the double wide homes was tossed around a mile downwind. The tornado was rated EF3 here with 150 miles per hour (240 km/h) winds and a damage width of 1/3 mile (0.54 km). Extensive ground scouring in fields east of Marysville were noted. This scouring was evidence of a multi-vortex tornado, which was confirmed by multiple videos and photographs. The tornado continued north of Barnes Road, damaging several clusters of trees in open country. The tornado intensified east of the intersection of Kettle Bottom and SR 362.

=== Scott, Jefferson, and Trimble counties ===
In Scott County immediately north of SR 362 and east of Concord Road, three homes were severely damaged while five double wide mobile homes were completely destroyed. Here, the tornado retained EF4 intensity, with windspeeds estimated to have been as high as 170 miles per hour (270 km/h). Just south of SR 362 in Clark County two additional homes and power poles were damaged greatly. From there, the tornado crossed into Jefferson County. Damage was observed along and just north of SR 362 near the county line. This included several mobile homes totally destroyed, several framed houses heavily damaged, tremendous tree damage, and power poles snapped and shredded.

The tornado traveled east-northeast snapping trees and power poles on County Road 850 and did its most significant damage at the intersection of Jackson Road, SR 62, and Swan Road about 2 miles (3.2 km) south of Chelsea. In this area, several well-built brick homes were destroyed. The homes had anchor bolts attached to steel plates and a concrete foundation. One house was lifted and slid 65 yards (59 m) off its foundation while mostly still intact. Another home was completely demolished and thrown downwind several hundred yards, within which there were three fatalities. The garage of this house was destroyed with one vehicle thrown 30 yards (27 m) and another tossed 75 yards (69 m). A piece of farm equipment was thrown approximately 200 yards (180 m) away. A third well-built brick home had its roof completely lifted and thrown over 300 yards (270 m) away. An above-ground pool half filled with water was dislodged by the tornado and was never recovered. Wind speeds in the area were estimated to be 170 miles per hour (270 km/h) with a damage width of 0.25 miles (0.40 km) across. Despite not being large, the tornado produced low-end EF4 damage here; the withhold of an EF5 rating was something that was "possible", noted in a National Weather Service publication in 2022.

The tornado tracked to the north of Paynesville and south of Lee Bottom, extensively damaging forests in southern Jefferson County before crossing the Ohio River into Trimble County, Kentucky. The damage width narrowed in this area to only about 200 yards (180 m) wide. The tornado damaged a home on Rodgers Road, overturned two barns, and uprooted and/or twisted several trees. This was consistent with EF1 damage and 105–110 miles per hour (169–177 km/h) estimated wind speeds. At the same time, a second vortex formed immediately adjacent to the first vortex and destroyed a barn on Rodgers Road, while extensively damaging another. This tornado also damaged a lot of rugged forested area before intersecting with the path of the first vortex near the confluence of KY 1838. In this area, the tornado was believed to have retained EF2 intensity with 115 miles per hour (185 km/h) estimated windspeeds.

Three single-wide mobile homes near the intersection of Joyce Mill Road and KY 625 were destroyed along with tree damage and downed power lines and poles. Damage in the area received an EF1 rating; the survey team concluded that 105 miles per hour (169 km/h) wind speeds and a damage width of 75 yards (69 m) were produced by the tornado.

No evidence of further damage was observed until Rawlett Lane, where some trees were snapped and uprooted. There could have been damage in-between although the survey team was unable to access this area. The tornado then struck two homes and a single-wide mobile home on New Hope Ridge Road (KY 2870) about 1.5 miles (2.4 km) west of KY 421. Here EF1 damage, inflicted by 90 miles per hour (140 km/h) winds, and a path width of 50 yards (46 m) were estimated, continuously weakening as the tornado moved to the west. The tornado lifted near this location, northwest of Bedford.

== Aftermath ==
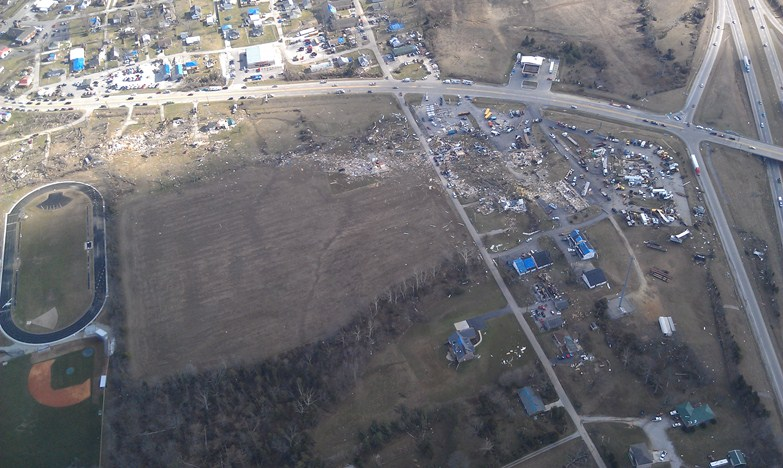
Aerial imagery of damage in Henryville after the tornado

The tornado destroyed hundreds of homes along a 49 miles (79 km) path. Samaritan Purse deployed emergency teams to five locations across the states that got affected by the tornado outbreak, including Henryville and Marysville. The tornado was one of the deadliest to ever hit southeastern Indiana, killing at least 11 people. It caused extreme wounds to victims, forcefully de-legging a woman in the Henryville area who was protecting her two children, both of whom survived the tornado. Other injuries caused by the tornado include a broken sternum, jaw fractures and a lacerated liver. In a December 2021 publication of the Courier Journal, journalists Mary Ramsey and Lucas Aulbach compared damage from the 2021 Western Kentucky EF4 tornado to that of the Henryville tornado that occurred ten years earlier. The Deitrich family, who owned five homes in the Henryville area, lost all five properties when the tornado barreled through the town.

It was initially believed that New Pekin and Marysville, Indiana, both of which sustained heavy damage in the tornado, would be abandoned. However, rebuilding in both towns commenced despite residents leaving. Marysville had a population of approximately 1,900 residents at the time of the tornado. In an Indiana Department of Health publication dated to late 2012, Karen Buchanan, who was a Jefferson County Public Health Nurse at the time of the tornado, noted that “everybody wanted to tell their story ... people may need some psychological first aid".

A decade after the tornado, in 2022, the National Weather Service office in Louisville referred to a possible EF5 damage location at a demolished house, where a pickup truck was blown away and never found and a backhoe was deposited into the basement of the house.

=== Recovery and rebuilding efforts ===
Property reconstruction company BELFOR was tasked with rebuilding the Henryville School campus, which was largely destroyed by the intense winds of the tornado. The company worked with school board members and local authorities to relocate students to temporary schooling facility while they worked on rebuilding the original school building. Two weeks after the tornado, elementary-level classes resumed at a temporary location; high school classes resumed three weeks after the tornado. The company conducted a controlled demolition of the building after taking out salvageable items and installed a security fence on the property to prevent looting in the demolished school. Henryville as a whole was rebuilt following the tornado. Indiana State Police worked to help people affected by the tornado in Henryville.

== Depiction in media ==
The tornado was the subject of an episode of Tornado Alley produced by The Weather Channel, titled Real Time Henryville. The tornado is also featured in I Survived: Five Epic Disasters, a book written by Lauren Tarshis.

== Gallery ==
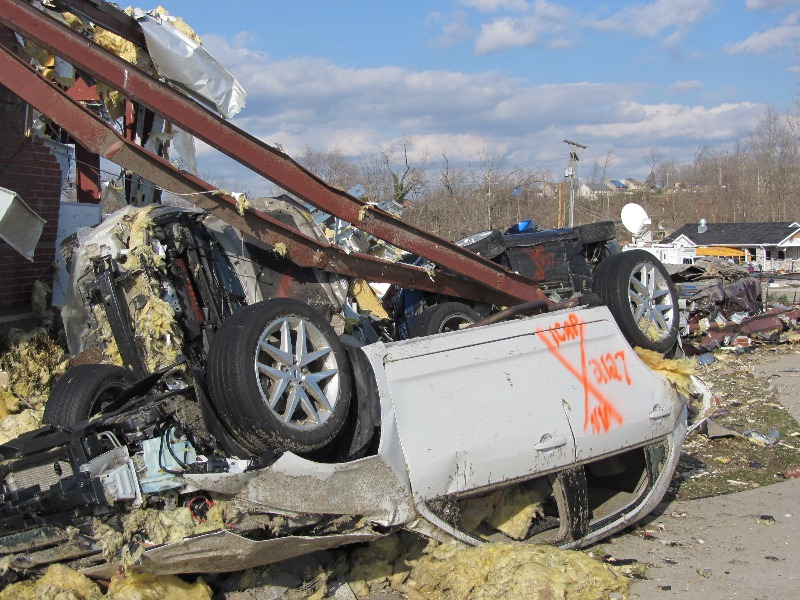
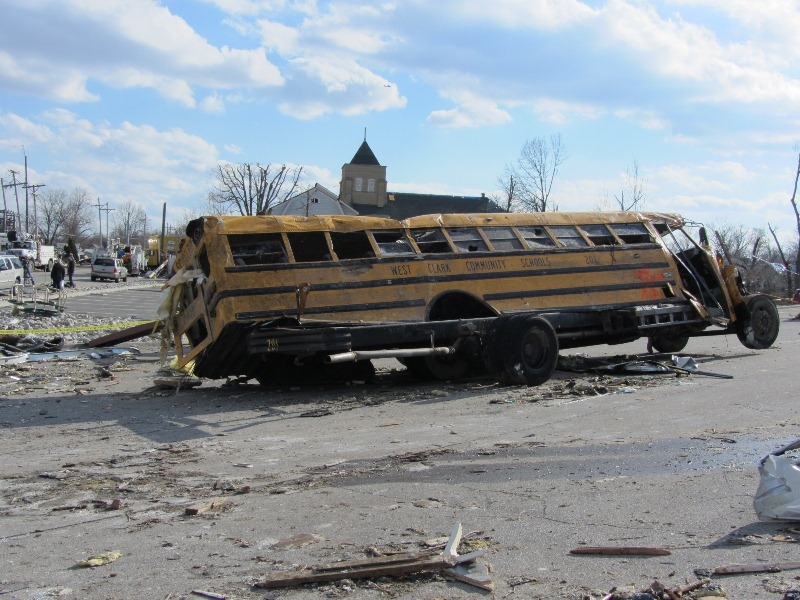
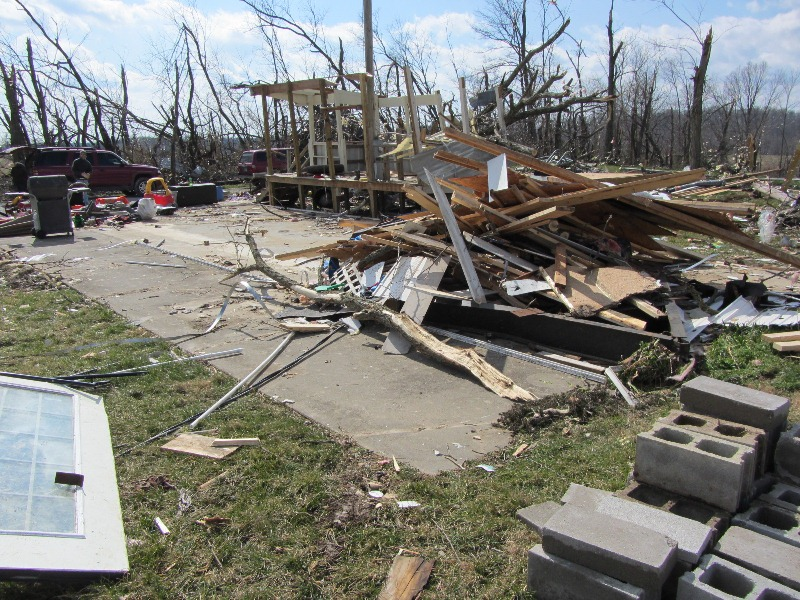
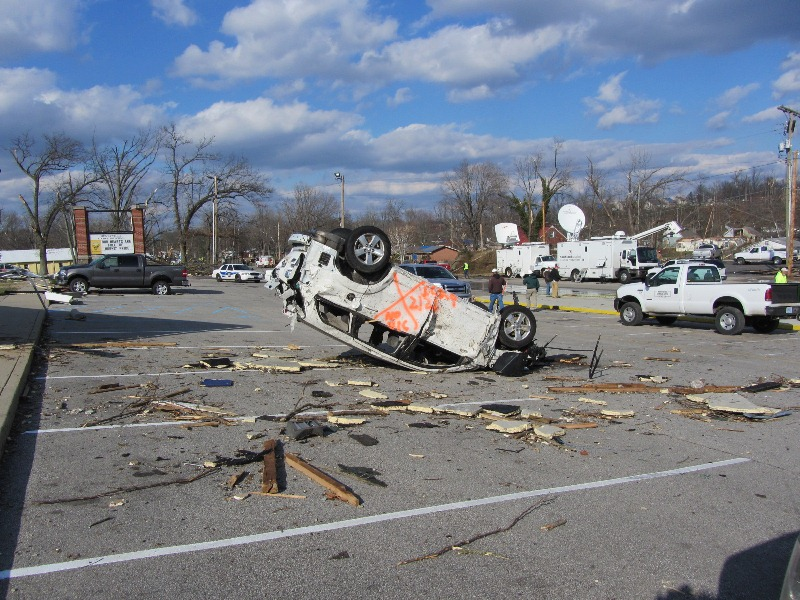
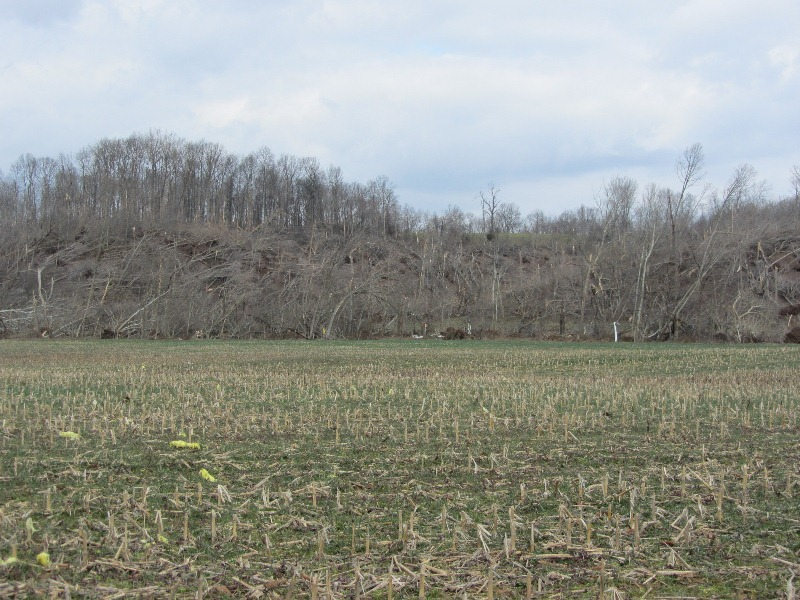
Ground photos of tornado damage in Henryville, Indiana produced by the tornado

== See also ==
- 1967 Belvidere tornado, Another violent tornado that directly struck a school and multiple buses
- 2012 Crittenden tornado – A short lived, but devastating EF4 tornado that impacted areas in northern Kentucky from the same storm
- 2012 West Liberty tornado – Another long-track and deadly, but rated EF3 tornado that impacted eastern Kentucky and western West Virginia hours later
- List of F4 and EF4 tornadoes (2010–2019)
- Weather of 2012

== Notes and citations ==
=== Sources ===
- BELFOR (2024). "West Clark Community Schools: Henryville, IN School Campus". BELFOR.
