= Louisa Burns =

American osteopathic physician

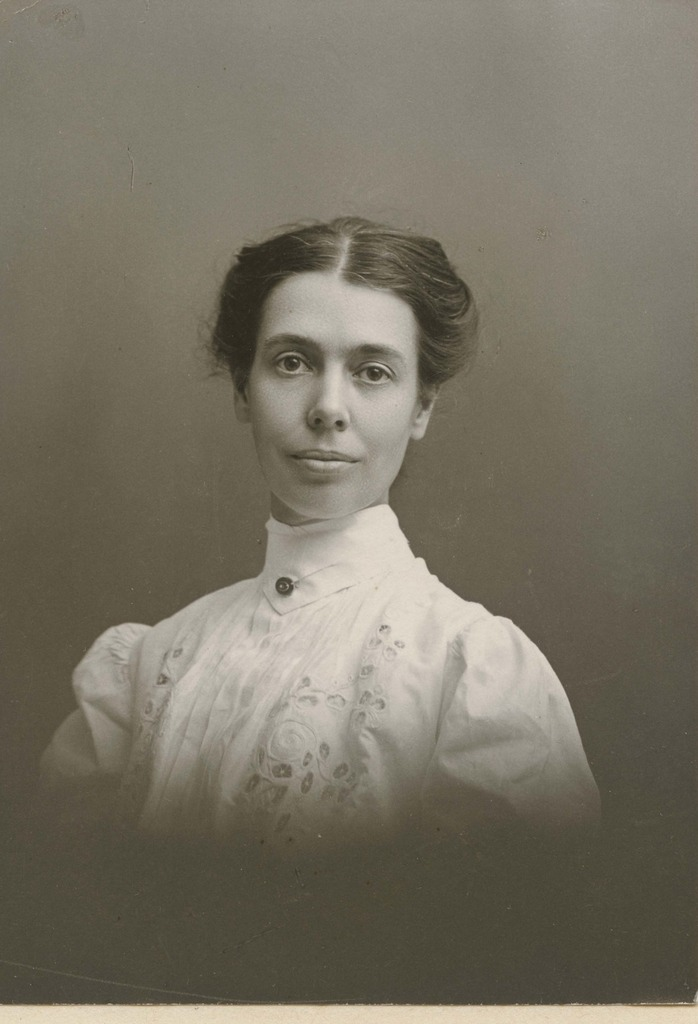
- Louisa Burns, 1907
- Born: 1869; Indiana
- Died: 1958 (aged 88–89); California
- Education: Doctor of Osteopathic Medicine from Pacific College of Osteopathy in 1903
- Occupations: Osteopathic physician, researcher
- Medical career
- Profession: Osteopathic medicine
- Institutions: A. T. Still Osteopathic Foundation and Research Institute
- Research: Viscerosomatic reflexes

Louisa Burns (c. 1869–1958) was an American osteopathic physician and researcher in osteopathic medicine.

== Education ==
Burns was born in Indiana in 1869. She earned her Bachelor of Science degree in 1892 from the Borden Institute and subsequently became a school teacher. Her interest in osteopathic medicine developed after she contracted a debilitating case of spinal meningitis, whose disabling effects were successfully reversed by osteopathic treatment. She went on to receive an osteopathic medicine degree from the Pacific College of Osteopathy in 1903. She then went on to earn a Master of Science from the Borden Institute and a Doctor of Science degree from the Pacific College of Osteopathy.

== Career ==
Burns was a prominent researcher in the field of osteopathic medicine in the early 1900s. Her research focused on viscerosomatic reflexes. Using rabbits and other organisms, she studied "osteopathic lesions", assisting in the development of today's understanding of somatic dysfunction. She headed the A.T. Still Research Institute from 1917 to 1935.

Burns retired in 1957 and died in 1958 in California.

== Legacy ==
Louisa Burns has a house named after her at Touro University Nevada College of Medicine.
