= Paoli Junior-Senior High School =

Location
- 501 Elm Street; Paoli, Indiana 47454; United States
- 38.550274°N 86.476989°W

Information
- Type: Public high school
- Superintendent: Greg Walker
- Principal: Ed Wagner
- Faculty: 46.00 (FTE)
- Grades: 7-12
- Enrollment: 571 (2023-24)
- Student to teacher ratio: 12.41
- Color
- Athletics conference: Patoka Lake Conference
- Team name: Rams
- Rivals: Springs Valley, Orleans,
- Newspaper: Paolite
- Website: Official Website

Paoli Junior-Senior High School is a public high school located in Paoli, Indiana.

== See also ==
- List of high schools in Indiana
