= Pierce Township, Washington County, Indiana =

Pierce Township
- Township
- Location in Washington County
- Coordinates: 38°30′40″N 86°03′47″W
- Country: United States
- State: Indiana
- County: Washington

Government
  - Type: Indiana township

Area
  - Total: 35.73 sq mi (92.5 km^{2})
  - Land: 35.61 sq mi (92.2 km^{2})
  - Water: 0.12 sq mi (0.31 km^{2}) 0.34%
- Elevation: 804 ft (245 m)

Population (2020)
  - Total: 2,504
  - Density: 70.32/sq mi (27.15/km^{2})
- ZIP codes: 47165, 47167
- GNIS feature ID: 0453730

Pierce Township is one of thirteen townships in Washington County, Indiana, United States. As of the 2020 census, its population was 2,504 and it contained 1,142 housing units.

Historical population
Census	Pop.	Note	%±
1890	1,048		—
1900	1,018		−2.9%
1910	1,136		11.6%
1920	1,051		−7.5%
1930	1,096		4.3%
1940	1,196		9.1%
1950	1,247		4.3%
1960	1,354		8.6%
1970	1,536		13.4%
1980	1,738		13.2%
1990	1,948		12.1%
2000	2,505		28.6%
2010	2,666		6.4%
2020	2,504		−6.1%
Source: US Decennial Census

== History ==
Pierce Township was organized in 1853. It was named for President Franklin Pierce.

== Geography ==
According to the 2010 census, the township has a total area of 35.73 square miles (92.5 km^{2}), of which 35.61 square miles (92.2 km^{2}) (or 99.66%) is land and 0.12 square miles (0.31 km^{2}) (or 0.34%) is water.

=== Cities, towns, villages ===
- New Pekin (west half)

=== Unincorporated towns ===
- Farabee at 38.557003°N 86.015808°W

(This list is based on USGS data and may include former settlements.)

=== Adjacent townships ===
- Washington Township (north)
- Franklin Township (northeast)
- Polk Township (east)
- Jackson Township (south)
- Howard Township (west)

=== Cemeteries ===
The township contains these four cemeteries: Blue River Church, Mount Pleasant Church, Old Blue River and Wilson.

=== Lakes ===
- Jordan Lake

== School districts ==
- East Washington School Corporation

== Political districts ==
- Indiana's 9th congressional district
- State House District 73
- State Senate District 47
