= Blue River Conference =

The Blue River Conference was an IHSAA-sanctioned conference that originally began as the Crawford County Conference. The small membership decided to join with schools from neighboring Harrison and Perry counties in 1959, changing to the Blue River Conference moniker. Originally consisting of smaller schools in the area, but as member schools consolidated mostly with each other, the schools became larger while the membership shrank. The only two non-consolidation additions were North Central in 1962, and Cannelton in 1974. Membership had shrunk to five schools in 1976 when four schools combined to form Crawford County. The discrepancy in size between the schools caused its demise in 1979, as the schools moved to the Patoka Lake, Southern, and Three Rivers conferences.

== Membership ==
School	Location	Mascot	Colors	County	Year joined	Previous conference	Year left	Conference joined
English	English	Red Raiders		13; Crawford	<1945	Independents	1976	none (consolidated into Crawford County)
Leavenworth	Leavenworth	Wyandottes		13; Crawford	<1945	Independents	1976	none (consolidated into Crawford County)
Marengo	Marengo	Cavemen		13; Crawford	<1945	Independents	1976	none (consolidated into Crawford County)
Milltown^{1}	Milltown	Millers		13; Crawford	<1945	Independents	1976	none (consolidated into Crawford County)
Lanesville^{2}	Lanesville	Eagles		31; Harrison	1959	Harrison County	1979	Southern
Morgan Township^{2}	Palmyra	Raiders		31; Harrison	1959	Harrison County	1969	none (consolidated into North Harrison)
Oil Township^{3}	Branchville	Oilers		62; Perry	1959	Perry County	1962	none (consolidated into Perry Central)
South Central (Elizabeth)^{2}	Elizabeth	Rebels		31; Harrison	1959	none (new school)	1979	Southern
North Central	New Salisbury	Tigers		31; Harrison	1962	Harrison County	1969	none (consolidated into North Harrison)
Perry Central	Leopold	Commodores		62; Perry	1962	none (new school)	1979	Patoka Lake
North Harrison	Ramsey	Cougars		31; Harrison	1969	none (new school)	1974	Independents (MSC 1978)
Cannelton	Cannelton	Bulldogs		62; Perry	1974	Independents (PAC 1971)	1979	Three Rivers
Crawford; County	Marengo	Wolfpack		13; Crawford	1976	none (new school)	1979	Patoka Lake

1. Played concurrently in CCC and Southern Monon Conference 1957–59.
2. Played concurrently in BRC and HCC 1959–62.
3. Played concurrently in BRC and PCC 1959–62.

== Resources ==
- Past and Present Conferences
