= West Washington Junior-Senior High School =

Location
- 8028 West Batt Road; Campbellsburg, Washington County, Indiana 47108; United States; 38.583419°N 86.234504°W

Information
- Type: Public high school
- School district: West Washington School Corporation
- Superintendent: Keith Nance
- Principal: Angela Girgis
- Faculty: 40.00 (FTE)
- Grades: 7-12
- Enrollment: 409 (2023-24)
- Student to teacher ratio: 10.22
- Color
- Athletics conference: Patoka Lake Conference
- Team name: Senators
- Rivals: Salem High School (Indiana)
- Website: Official Website

West Washington Junior-Senior High School is a public high school located in Campbellsburg, Indiana.

== Athletics ==
West Washington Junior-Senior High School's athletic teams are the Senators and they compete in the Patoka Lake Athletic Conference. The school offers a wide range of athletics including:

- Baseball
- Basketball
- Cross Country
- Football
- Golf
- Softball
- Track and Field
- Volleyball
- Wrestling

=== Wrestling ===
The 2017 season was the first ever for the school, and senior Griffin Packwood (wt. 220) advanced to the Semi-State Championship.

The 2018 season was the first ever for Jr. High, with junior Caleb Murphy (wt. 220) and senior Jude Livers (wt. 120) advancing to the Regional Championship, with Caleb Murphy making it to the Semi-State Championship.

The 2019 season the first for students in the elementary, and freshman Wyatt Johnston (wt. 113) and junior Landon Pearson (wt. 285) advanced to the Regional Championship.

In the 2022 season, two seniors, Wyatt Johnston (wt. 152) and Mason Jones (wt. 113), both reached 100 career varsity wins, a school record. Wyatt was also the first sectional champion in school history. Both Wyatt and Mason advanced to the Semi-State.

=== Football ===
The 1993–94 Football team, led by Head Coach Todd Pritchett, went 11–3 overall (4–0 in conference play) and lost in the State Championship of the 1993–94 IHSAA Football State Tournament (Class 1A). The team lost 16–37 against North Miami Middle/High School

The 2015–16 Football team, led by Head Coach Phillip Bowsman, went 11–1 overall (5–0 in conference play) and lost in the Regional Championship of the 2015–16 IHSAA Football State Tournament (Class 1A). The team lost 13–35 against Linton-Stockton High School.

The 2019–20 Football team, led by Head Coach Phillip Bowsman, went 12–2 overall (7–0 in conference play), winning both the Sectional and Regional Championship games in Class 1A. The Senators lost in the Semi State Championship to Covenant Christian High School.

=== Year-by-Year Results ===
Yearly record

2020: 11–1, Regional Champions

2019: 12–2, Regional Champions

2018: 9–3

2017: 5–5

2016: 11–1

2015: 11–1, Sectional Champions

2014: 5–5

2013: 5–6

2012: 9–4, Sectional Champions

2011: 5–5

2010: 9–3

2009: 5–5

2008: 6–5

2007: 3–7

2006: 4–5

2005: 8–4

2004: 9–3

2003: 5–6

2002: 5–6

2001: 4–7

2000: 8–4

1999: 3–8

1998: 5–6

1997: 6–4

1996: 7–3

1995: 5–4

1994: 11–2, Regional Champions

1993: 11–3, Semi-State Champions

1992: 2–7

1991: 1–8

1990: 1–9

1989: 3–7

1988: 0–9

1987: 2–7

1986: 0–9

1985: 2–7

1984: 7–3

1983: 2–7

1982: 2–8

1981: 6–4

1980: 2–8

1979: 3–6

1978: 0–9

1977: 3–6

1976: 10–0

1975: 5–5

1974: 4–6

1973: 0–8

== See also ==
- List of high schools in Indiana
