= Hannah Toliver =

Freed Black woman who helped slaves escape.

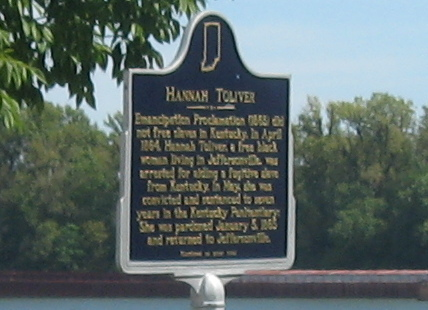
- Image of the historical marker for Hannah Toliver in Jeffersonville (Clark County, Indiana)
- Born: Hannah Coleman c. 1826-1835; Kentucky
- Criminal charges: Seven years in prison; served one
- Spouse: George Toliver

Hannah Toliver (born Hannah Coleman, c.1826-1835) was a freed Black woman in Jeffersonville, Indiana, who aided an enslaved person with escaping to freedom. Toliver was arrested and sentenced to prison in Kentucky, in 1864. She received a pardon in 1865.

== Life ==
Toliver was born in Kentucky around 1830, as Hannah Coleman. She worked as a washerwoman before and after being enslaved. On September 5, 1849, she married boatman George Toliver in Orange County, Indiana. The two then moved and lived in Jeffersonville, Indiana, by 1850.

== Legacy ==
After the establishment of the Emancipation Proclamation, there were still enslaved Black people in the United States. Toliver and her husband worked to free enslaved people in the South, taking them from Kentucky to Indiana.

Toliver was arrested in Kentucky in early 1864 for aiding an enslaved person and was sentenced to 7 years in the Kentucky State Penitentiary. After the Thirteenth Amendment was passed by Congress, Kentucky Governor Thomas Bramlette pardoned Hannah Toliver. On January 5, 1865, she received the pardon and returned home.

In 2008, the Indiana Historical Bureau, City of Jeffersonville, and the Division of History Preservation & Archaeology (IDNR) erected a marker for Hannah Toliver in Jeffersonville in Clark County, Indiana. This marker was a stop on the African American Heritage Trail in southern Indiana.
