= Crothersville Junior-Senior High School =

Location
- 109 North Preston St; Crothersville, Jackson County, Indiana 47229; United States
- Coordinates: 38.797838°N 85.836398°W

Information
- Type: Public high school
- Established: 1914
- School district: Crothersville Community Schools
- Superintendent: Chrystal Street
- Principal: Doug Ballinger
- Teaching staff: 21.00 (FTE)
- Grades: 6-12
- Enrollment: 220 (2023–2024)
- Student to teacher ratio: 10.48
- Color
- Athletics conference: Southern
- Team name: Tigers
- Rivals: Austin Eagles
- Website: Official Website

Crothersville Junior-Senior High School is a public middle school and high school located in Crothersville, Indiana.

== See also ==
- List of high schools in Indiana
