= Borden Jr/Sr High School =

Public high school in Borden, Indiana

Location
- 301 West Street; Borden, Clark County, Indiana 47106; United States; 38.469221°N 85.946835°W

Information
- Type: Public high school
- Established: 1925
- School district: Borden-Henryville School Corporation
- Superintendent: Dr. Brent Comer
- Principal: Charles Gardner
- Teaching staff: 26.50 (on an FTE basis)
- Grades: 7–12
- Enrollment: 317 (2023-2024)
- Student to teacher ratio: 11.96
- Color
- Athletics conference: Southern
- Team name: Braves
- Website: bhs.bhsc.school

Borden Jr/Sr High School is a secondary school located in Borden, Indiana, United States.

== See also ==
- List of high schools in Indiana
- Southern Athletic Conference of Indiana
- Borden, Indiana
