= Borden Normal School =

- Borden Institute
- Formerly listed on the U.S. National Register of Historic Places
- Location within Clark County, Indiana Location within Indiana Location within the United States
- Location: West St., Borden, Indiana
- Coordinates: 38°28′05″N 85°56′37″W
- Area: 10 acres (4.0 ha)
- Built: 1883
- Architectural style: Late Victorian
- NRHP reference No.: 73000030

Significant dates
- Added to NRHP: June 13, 1973
- Removed from NRHP: July 16, 1986

The Borden Institute was located in Borden, Indiana. It was placed on the National Register of Historic Places in 1973 but removed in 1986. William W. Borden established the school in 1884 to serve the children of local farmers. The education "was a creative institution of unusual distinction" in the way it prepared its students to teach and to conduct scientific laboratory studies. Students of the school have said there were very few regulations.

It had an impressive library of 1,500 volumes at its opening, gaining an additional 50-100 every year. By 1904 the facility had 3,000 books.

The institute closed in 1906. The building would continue to see educational use until the 1950s. Even though preservationists succeeded in protecting it for 12 years, the building was condemned in 1978 and later razed due to fears that nearby elementary school children would be hurt if they played on the property.
