= Medora Junior-Senior High School =

Location
- 82 South George St; Medora, Jackson County, Indiana 47229; United States
- Coordinates: 38.823845°N 86.171859°W

Information
- Type: Public high school
- School district: Medora Community School Corporation
- Principal: Chrystal Street
- Teaching staff: 11.50 (FTE)
- Grades: 6-12
- Enrollment: 96 (2023–2024)
- Student to teacher ratio: 8.35
- Color
- Athletics conference: Southern Roads Conference
- Team name: Hornets
- Website: Official Website

Medora Junior-Senior High School is a public middle school and high school located in Medora, Indiana.

The school's basketball team is the subject of the 2013 documentary Medora.

== See also ==
- List of high schools in Indiana
