= Bedford North Lawrence High School =

School in Bedford, Indiana, United States

Location
- 595 Stars Boulevard; Bedford, Lawrence County, Indiana 47421; United States; 38.880811°N 86.443842°W

Information
- Type: Public high school
- Motto: Tradition Never Graduates
- Established: 1974
- School district: North Lawrence Community Schools
- Principal: Todd Tanksley
- Teaching staff: 77.28 (FTE)
- Grades: 9-12
- Enrollment: 1,249 (2023-2024)
- Student to teacher ratio: 16.16
- Color
- Athletics conference: Hoosier Hills Conference
- Nickname: Stars
- Website: Official Website

Bedford North Lawrence High School is a comprehensive, four-year public high school located in the eastern part of Bedford, Indiana. It is accredited by the Indiana Department of Education and North Central Association of Colleges and Schools. Established in 1974, the school consolidated seven area high schools: Bedford, Tunnelton, Shawswick, Needmore, Fayetteville, Oolitic, and Heltonville. Bedford North Lawrence is fed from Bedford Middle Schools, Lawrence County Independent Schools, Springville Community Academy, as well as the private St. Vincent de Paul School.

The school's mission is "...as a purposeful learning community that each student reaches his or her full potential."

== Athletics ==
The Stars have won eight IHSAA state championships.

State Championships
Sport	Year(s)
Boys Basketball	1990
Girls Basketball	1983, 1991, 2013, 2014, 2023
Unified Flag Football	2019
Unified Track & Field	2022

== Notable alumni ==
- Clayton Anderson, country music artist
- Damon Bailey, professional basketball player
- Craig Bowden, professional golfer
- Ken Bowersox, NASA astronaut
- Aishah Hasnie, Fox News reporter
- Mark Kinser, auto racer
- Christopher May, member of the Indiana House of Representatives

== See also ==
- List of high schools in Indiana
