= Orleans High School =

Orleans Jr. Sr. High School

Location
- 200 West Wilson Street; Orleans, Orange County, Indiana 47452; United States; 38.66794°N 86.45428°W

Information
- Type: Public high school
- Established: 1866
- School district: Orleans Community Schools
- CEEB code: 152700
- Principal: Tim Day
- Teaching staff: 32.00 (FTE)
- Grades: 7-12
- Enrollment: 398 (2023–2024)
- Student to teacher ratio: 12.44
- Color
- Athletics: IHSAA
- Athletics conference: Patoka Lake Conference
- Team name: Bulldogs
- Newspaper: Bulldog Bulletin
- Website: Official Website

Orleans Jr. Sr. High School is a public high school in Orleans, Indiana.

== History ==
Orleans High School was organized in 1866. Its first graduating class was in 1872.

== Curriculum ==
Orleans High School offers a comprehensive college-preparatory curriculum. Vocational courses at the Bedford Career Center and the Lost River Career Co-op are available to students in grades 11 and 12.

== Extracurricular activities ==
=== Athletics ===
The school's teams, known as the Orleans Bulldogs, compete in Indiana High School Athletic Association size classification A in the Patoka Lake Conference. Teams are fielded in baseball, basketball, cross country, golf, softball, track and field, and volleyball. The school's most successful sport has been boys basketball as the Bulldogs have won 16 Sectional championships, the first coming in 1953. The boys basketball program has also won two Regional titles, one Semi-State title, and one State championship title. The Bulldogs captured the school's first IHSAA State title in any sport when the boys basketball team defeated Clinton Prairie High School at Gainbridge Fieldhouse in Indianapolis to win the 2025 IHSAA 1A Boys Basketball State Championship. This marked the first time that any athletic team in Orange County has won a State title. It also marked the farthest any Orleans athletics team had advanced in the state tournament since the Bulldogs boys basketball team advanced to the state championship round in 1913.

=== Band ===
The Orleans Jr. Sr. High school marching band is called the Orleans Bulldog Regiment. The band competes in the Indiana ISSMA in Class D. They have made it to state four times. In 1992, they received 10th place. In 1998, they received 3rd place. In 1999, they received 2nd place. The band returned to state in 2010, placing 10th in Class D. The Orleans Bulldog Regiment has also hosted The Orleans Pep Band Invitational since 2008. Orleans is known for having one of the top high school pep bands in the state of Indiana.

=== Academic Super Bowl ===
The Orleans High School academic team won state championship banners in the Indiana Academic Super Bowl in 2004 (Fine Arts), 2006 (Interdisciplinary), 2009 (Fine Arts), 2011 (English, Fine Arts, Social Studies), 2012 (Social Studies), 2015 (English, Fine Arts), 2016 (Social Studies), and 2017 (Fine Arts, Social Studies). Thirty-two Orleans academic squads earned state finalist honors in 1997, 1999–2007, 2009–2012, 2014, 2015, and 2017. The Orleans team has won the Patoka Lake Academic Conference Invitational eleven of the past twelve years (2006–2017). Orleans High School academic coaches, Kristina Hole and Leah Morgan, were honored in 2014 with the Dick Ramey Above and Beyond Award by the Indiana Association of School Principals.

=== Accomplishments ===
2025 IHSAA Class 1A Boys Basketball State Champions

== See also ==
- List of high schools in Indiana
