= New Washington Middle/High School =

Location
- 226 State Rd. 62 North; New Washington, Indiana 47162; United States
- 38.565667°N 85.541305°W

Information
- Type: Public high school
- Established: 1912
- School district: Greater Clark County Schools
- Principal: Ahnya Evinger
- Teaching staff: 28.00 (on an FTE basis)
- Grades: 6–12
- Enrollment: 335 (2023–2024)
- Student to teacher ratio: 11.96
- Color
- Team name: Mustangs
- Website: nwmhs.gccschools.com

New Washington Middle/High School is a middle school and high school located in New Washington, Indiana.

According to current knowledge and alumni testimony, senior-grade students are permitted to take their lunches separately from other grades on the balcony bleachers in one of the two (modestly accommodating) gymnasiums. In 2018 there was an incident where a seat in the balcony bleachers was damaged, almost resulting in senior students losing balcony privileges over a miscommunication. This miscommunication was the result of the principal at the time, Mrs. Carla Hobson, presuming students would not report such an incident, when in fact two students went to the front office immediately.

Before New Washington's Blue Mustang, they were recognized as the Blue Devils.

== See also ==
- List of high schools in Indiana
- Southern Athletic Conference of Indiana
- New Washington, Indiana

== Sources ==
- 2019 Alumnus Graduate (just now learning his highschool has a Wikipedia Page)
