= Henryville Jr/Sr High School =

School in Indiana, US

Location
- 213 North Ferguson Drive; Henryville, Indiana 47126; United States; 38°32′37″N 85°46′12″W

Information
- School type: Public, High School
- Established: 1916
- School district: Borden–Henryville School Corporation
- CEEB code: 151525
- Principal: Kyle Lewis
- Teaching staff: 34.50 (on an FTE basis)
- Grades: 7 to 12
- Enrollment: 487 (2024-2025)
- Student to teacher ratio: 14.12
- Colors: Black and gold
- Athletics conference: Southern Athletic Conference
- Nickname: Hornets
- Website: hhs.bhsc.school

Henryville Jr/Sr High School is located in Henryville, Indiana. It is part of the Borden–Henryville School Corporation.

== History ==
On March 2, 2012, the school was severely damaged by a tornado, but there were no reports of major injuries.

== Demographics ==
The demographic breakdown of the 477 students enrolled in 2021–2022 was:

- Male - 52.2%
- Female - 47.8%
- Asian - <1.0%
- Black - <1.0%
- Hispanic - 2.9%
- White - 92.5%
- Multiracial - 3.1%

26.4% of the students were eligible for free or reduced-cost lunch. Henryville is a Title I school.

== Athletics ==
The Henryville Hornets compete in the Southern Athletic Conference. The school colors are black and gold. The following Indiana High School Athletic Association (IHSAA) sanctioned sports are offered:

- Baseball (boys)
- Basketball (girls and boys)
- Cross country (girls and boys)
- Golf (girls and boys)
- Soccer (boys)
- Softball (girls)
- Swimming (girls and boys)
- Tennis (girls and boys)
- Track and field (girls and boys)
- Volleyball (girls)
- American Football

== See also ==
- List of high schools in Indiana
