= Crothersville, Indiana =

- Town
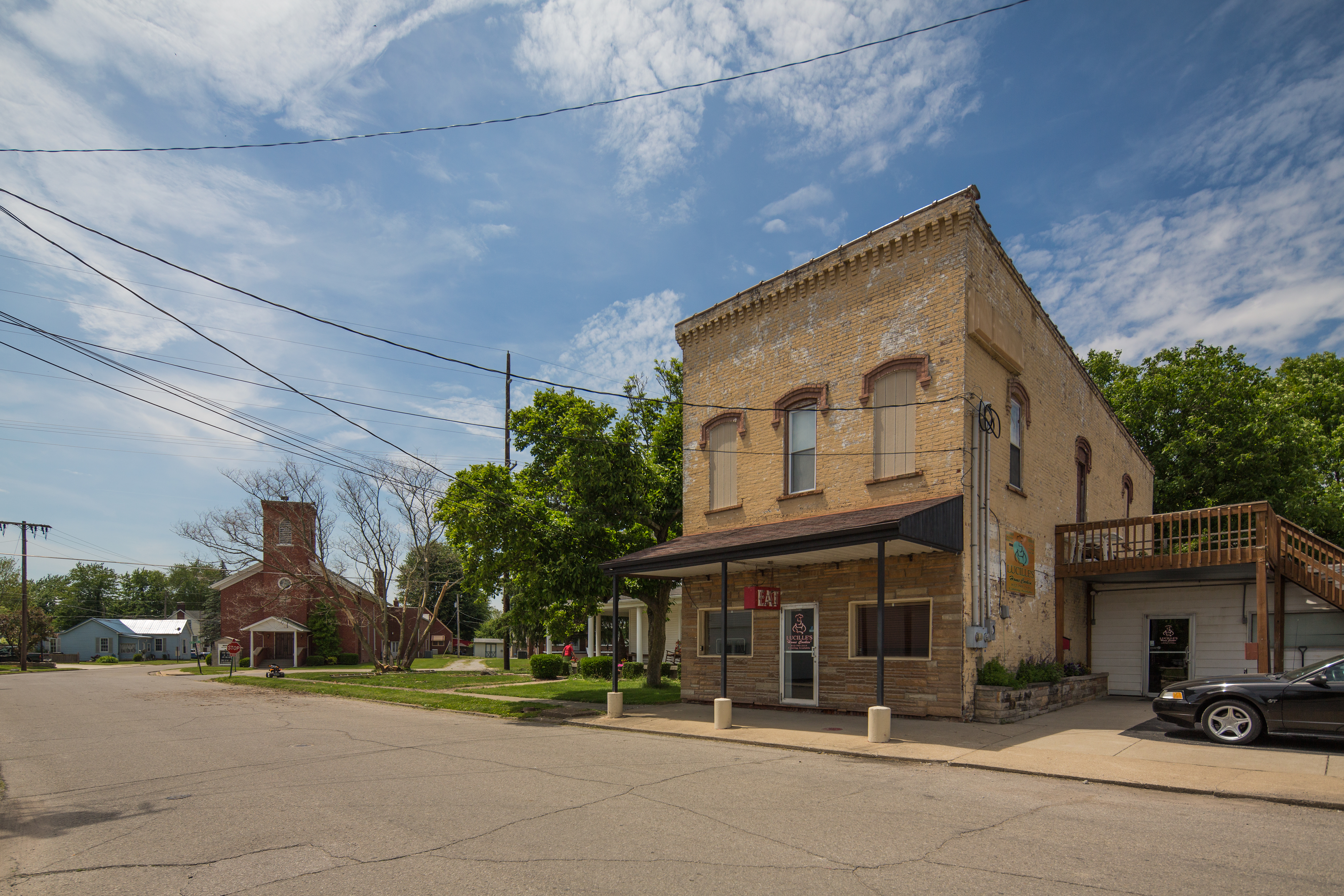
- Crothersville, Indiana

- Location of Crothersville in Jackson County, Indiana.

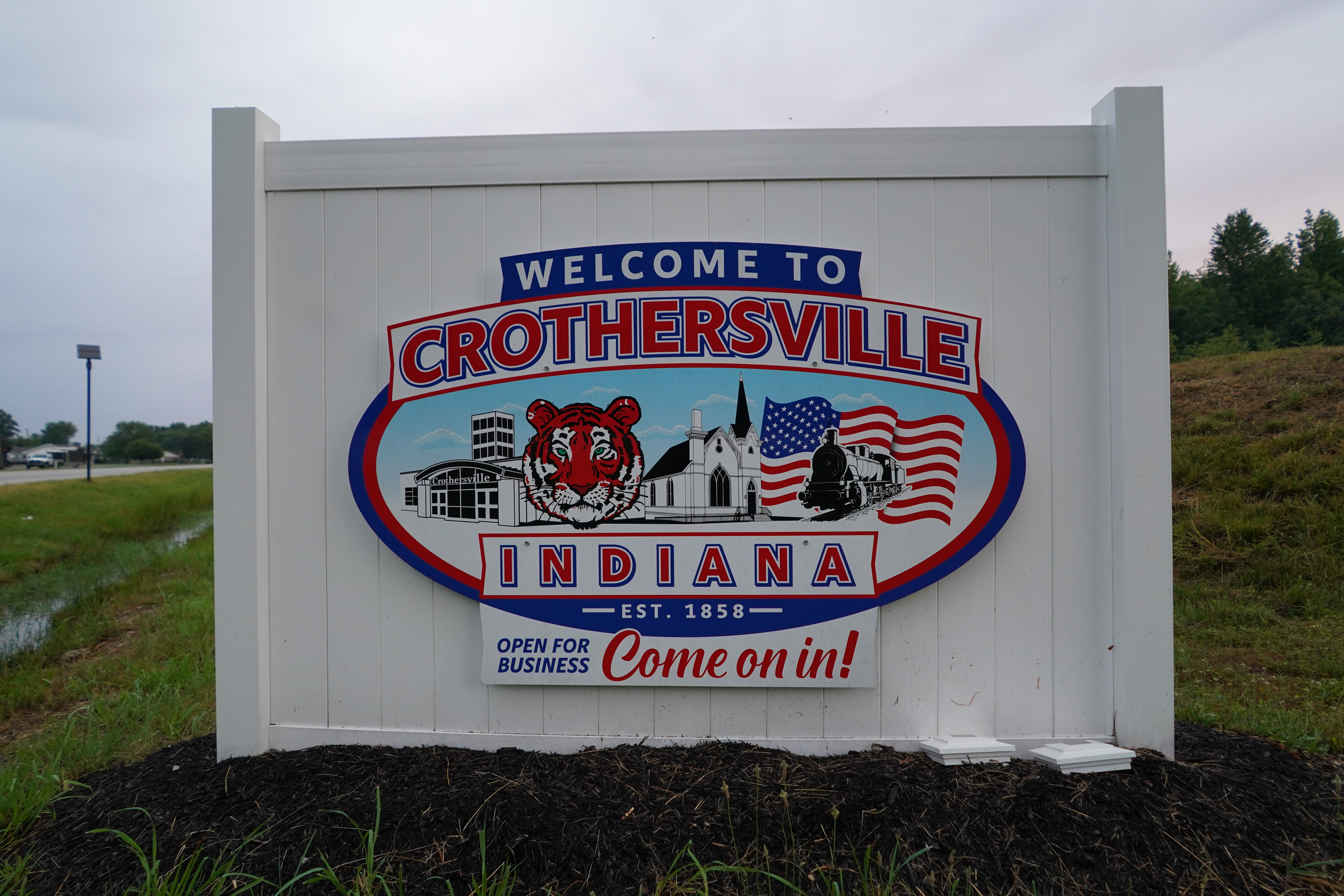
- Crothersville, Indiana Welcome Sign
- Coordinates: 38°47′40″N 85°50′24″W
- Country: United States
- State: Indiana
- County: Jackson
- Township: Vernon

Area
  - Total: 1.16 sq mi (3.00 km^{2})
  - Land: 1.16 sq mi (3.00 km^{2})
  - Water: 0 sq mi (0.00 km^{2})
- Elevation: 554 ft (169 m)

Population (2020)
  - Total: 1,509
  - Density: 1,301/sq mi (502.4/km^{2})
- Time zone: UTC-5 (EST)
  - Summer (DST): UTC-5 (EST)
- ZIP code: 47229
- Area code: 812
- FIPS code: 18-16084
- GNIS feature ID: 2396669
- Website: www.in.gov/towns/crothersville/

Crothersville is a town in Vernon Township, Jackson County, Indiana, United States. As of the 2020 census, Crothersville had a population of 1,509. It was laid out in 1835 and named after Dr. Andrew S. Crothers, a railroad superintendent.

== Geography ==
According to the 2010 census, Crothersville has a total area of 1.14 square miles (2.95 km^{2}), all land.

== Demographics ==
Historical population
| Census | Pop. | Note | %± |
|---|---|---|---|
| 1880 | 435 | | — |
| 1890 | 599 | | 37.7% |
| 1900 | 765 | | 27.7% |
| 1910 | 1,038 | | 35.7% |
| 1920 | 1,131 | | 9.0% |
| 1930 | 979 | | −13.4% |
| 1940 | 1,169 | | 19.4% |
| 1950 | 1,276 | | 9.2% |
| 1960 | 1,449 | | 13.6% |
| 1970 | 1,663 | | 14.8% |
| 1980 | 1,747 | | 5.1% |
| 1990 | 1,687 | | −3.4% |
| 2000 | 1,570 | | −6.9% |
| 2010 | 1,591 | | 1.3% |
| 2020 | 1,509 | | −5.2% |
U.S. Decennial Census

=== 2020 census ===
As of the 2020 census, Crothersville had a population of 1,509. The median age was 38.6 years. 25.6% of residents were under the age of 18 and 16.9% of residents were 65 years of age or older. For every 100 females, there were 92.5 males, and for every 100 females age 18 and over, there were 89.8 males age 18 and over.

0.0% of residents lived in urban areas, while 100.0% lived in rural areas.

There were 606 households in Crothersville, of which 33.0% had children under the age of 18 living in them. Of all households, 47.9% were married-couple households, 16.5% were households with a male householder and no spouse or partner present, and 27.6% were households with a female householder and no spouse or partner present. About 26.8% of all households were made up of individuals and 14.0% had someone living alone who was 65 years of age or older.

There were 669 housing units, of which 9.4% were vacant. The homeowner vacancy rate was 0.4% and the rental vacancy rate was 9.8%.

Racial composition as of the 2020 census
| Race | Number | Percent |
|---|---|---|
| White | 1,431 | 94.8% |
| Black or African American | 0 | 0.0% |
| American Indian and Alaska Native | 0 | 0.0% |
| Asian | 4 | 0.3% |
| Native Hawaiian and Other Pacific Islander | 0 | 0.0% |
| Some other race | 22 | 1.5% |
| Two or more races | 52 | 3.4% |
| Hispanic or Latino (of any race) | 48 | 3.2% |

=== 2010 census ===
As of the census of 2010, there were 1,591 people, 625 households, and 438 families residing in the town. The population density was 1,395.6 inhabitants per square mile (538.8/km^{2}). There were 722 housing units at an average density of 633.3 per square mile (244.5/km^{2}). The racial makeup of the town was 96.2% White, 0.2% African American, 0.3% Native American, 0.4% Asian, 1.3% from other races, and 1.5% from two or more races. Hispanic or Latino of any race were 2.1% of the population.

There were 625 households, of which 35.0% had children under the age of 18 living with them, 53.3% were married couples living together, 12.5% had a female householder with no husband present, 4.3% had a male householder with no wife present, and 29.9% were non-families. 25.0% of all households were made up of individuals, and 9.5% had someone living alone who was 65 years of age or older. The average household size was 2.55 and the average family size was 3.00.

The median age in the town was 37.9 years. 24.8% of residents were under the age of 18; 7.5% were between the ages of 18 and 24; 27% were from 25 to 44; 25.3% were from 45 to 64; and 15.5% were 65 years of age or older. The gender makeup of the town was 48.6% male and 51.4% female.

=== 2000 census ===
As of the census of 2000, there were 1,570 people, 648 households, and 458 families residing in the town. The population density was 1,372.2 inhabitants per square mile (529.8/km^{2}). There were 720 housing units at an average density of 629.3 per square mile (243.0/km^{2}). The racial makeup of the town was 98.41% White, 0.19% Native American, 0.38% Asian, 0.38% from other races, and 0.64% from two or more races. Hispanic or Latino of any race were 1.53% of the population.

There were 648 households, out of which 30.7% had children under the age of 18 living with them, 53.5% were married couples living together, 11.9% had a female householder with no husband present, and 29.2% were non-families. 25.6% of all households were made up of individuals, and 11.9% had someone living alone who was 65 years of age or older. The average household size was 2.42 and the average family size was 2.86.

In the town, the population was spread out, with 24.5% under the age of 18, 8.5% from 18 to 24, 29.4% from 25 to 44, 23.1% from 45 to 64, and 14.5% who were 65 years of age or older. The median age was 37 years. For every 100 females, there were 93.1 males. For every 100 females age 18 and over, there were 91.7 males.

The median income for a household in the town was $32,768, and the median income for a family was $36,776. Males had a median income of $29,856 versus $21,486 for females. The per capita income for the town was $18,182. About 7.3% of families and 8.8% of the population were below the poverty line, including 8.5% of those under age 18 and 7.3% of those age 65 or over.

== Adult store controversy ==
Lion's Den, a store selling adult sexual products and pornography, opened in Crothersville near the Interstate 65 exit in 2005. From the day the store opened, Christian protestors photographed persons entering the store parking lot day and night from a surveillance structure on frontage property. According to a protest organizer, Pastor Jon Pearce of First Baptist Church of Crothersville, people in the community were motivated by rumors, never substantiated, that Lion's Den was "gonna have videos and stuff on bestiality and just all kinds of terrible things about chasing down young girls and raping them."

The protestors, who called themselves the Uniontown Watchdogs, also wrote down license plates and notified trucking companies that their drivers were allegedly patronizing the store. Photographs of alleged patrons were posted to a web site. Reportedly, "a parole officer from another county ran the plate numbers recorded by the Watchdogs." The protestors placed signs at the store's parking lot entrance which read, "Warning! All license plates are recorded!" and "Over 2 million will see you on war-line.net." They sometimes yelled comments at persons who entered the property and offered free Bibles.

The protests were not without controversy however. In addition to building a platform to look over a fence constructed by the business to maintain their practice of photographing people walking in and out of the store, several complaints were also issued over the shining of a floodlight in the faces of drivers passing by, in preparation to take a photograph if they entered the property, leading to several near misses with protesters and other autos.

On July 30, 2010, in response to a lawsuit filed by Jackson County, special Bartholomew Circuit Court judge Stephen R. Heimann, a Democrat, ruled that the store violated a county licensing ordinance and must be closed. He ruled that the county could constitutionally bar the business from operating at the location as part of its intent to protect the health, safety, and welfare of county residents, and that the ordinance was content neutral since it did not seek to ban adult businesses. Lion's Den violated the ordinance because it was operating within 1,000 feet of a residence. Jackson County commissioners adopted the ordinance three days before Lion's Den opened, after they discovered it was going to be an adult business. The store closed within days after the ruling while Lion's Den appealed the case. On June 7, 2011, the Court of Appeals of Indiana unanimously affirmed Judge Heimann's ruling. Lion's Den is an Ohio-based company with about 30 stores across the United States at the time of the Crothersville conflict.

In 2008, Melvin Ray Owen, a spokesman and organizer for the anti-pornography protesters was arrested for sexual battery on a girl of 16. Reverend Roger Smith, who testified on behalf of Owen, told the court, that Owen was "touchy-feely. He hugs everybody in church. It is out of character for him be anything but someone who wants to do good.” Owen claimed that he was the victim of an aggressive girl who had been propositioning him: “I touched her breast, I did. I also blowed on her hair and punched her ribs. It wasn’t an accident and I’ll tell you why. I touched her to try to get her off my lap and she wouldn’t get off it." After changing his plea to guilty, Owen was sentenced to 90 days in jail and 90 days home incarceration.

== Drug bootlegging and a homicide ==
On February 10, 2005, Crothersville was featured in a New York Times article about the town's alleged "scourge of methamphetamine." The Times' narrative was that a town "where everyone seems somehow related," is "seemingly transformed" by the death of a 10-year-old, Katlyn Collman, who "police say...stumbled on (sic) someone with methamphetamine..." The story highlights a Crothersville stricken with fear after the death and the discovery of two facilities for making bootleg methamphetamine. Without explaining who they are or where they have gone, the article claims that "Shady characters no longer stalk the streets of the one-stoplight town, where ribbons of blue, Katie's favorite color, hang from utility poles and porches. Gone, too, are the bike-riding and dog-walking youngsters, now let outside to play only with their parents, or in groups." One father "said he checks what his 10-year-old son and 7-year-old daughter are wearing each morning, for fear of having to describe them to the police." The article claims that in "Jackson County, which includes Crothersville, meth-related arrests skyrocketed to 116 in 2004 from 29 in 2002." Pastor Jon Pearce, who helped to organize the protest against Lion's Den, is quoted regarding the purported illegal drug problem: "If we had a brothel move into town, people would close it down instantly. If we had an X-rated movie house come, it'd be gone within a week. But this has been here. It is a monster. We didn't know what kind of monster it was." The Times article includes no crime statistics for Crothersville that might affirm the implication that the town was dangerous.

On May 25, 2005, the Times reported that, "Tossing aside their original theory that a 10-year-old Indiana girl was murdered because she saw people making methamphetamine, prosecutors on Friday dropped charges against the man whose statements led them to that belief, charging instead another man connected by DNA and other physical evidence to the crime." The Times quoted a local merchant claiming to have "sold 2,000 T-shirts with Katie's photograph to people in four states, [who] said that even if the methamphetamine theory had no merit, the murder 'shined a light on the drug problem' in town." The Times reported, "Steven Drizin, legal director of the Center on Wrongful Convictions at Northwestern University, said the case had the hallmark of a false, coerced confession.." The Times did not refer to or retract its own inaccurate reporting in the February article. CBS did its part to promote hysteria with a report titled, "Girl's Murder Amplifies Drug War."

Anthony Ray Stockelman, pleaded guilty to abducting, molesting, and murdering the child and received a sentence of life in prison. He had no prior criminal record, and no cited connection to methamphetamine. A cousin of the victim, serving a burglary sentence in the same facility where Stockelman was held, was charged for tattooing "Katie's Revenge" on the forehead of her killer.

== Education ==
Crothersville has a public library, a branch of the Jackson County Public Library.
