= Borden, Indiana =

- Town
- Town of Borden
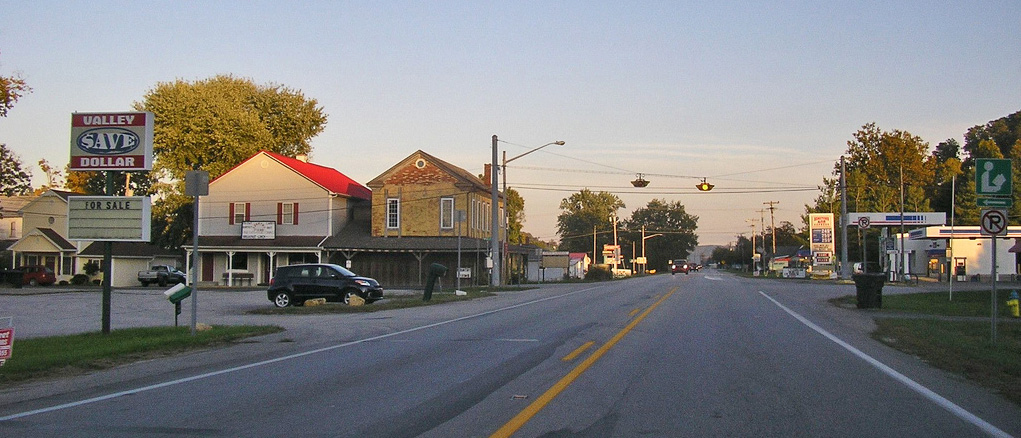
- Downtown Borden

- Flag
- Nickname: Scenic Valley
- Location of Borden in Clark County, Indiana.
- Coordinates: 38°28′12″N 85°56′57″W
- Country: United States
- State: Indiana
- County: Clark
- Township: Wood
- Established: 1816

Area
  - Total: 1.39 sq mi (3.61 km^{2})
  - Land: 1.39 sq mi (3.60 km^{2})
  - Water: 0 sq mi (0.00 km^{2})
- Elevation: 571 ft (174 m)

Population (2020)
  - Total: 786
  - Density: 564.8/sq mi (218.06/km^{2})
- Time zone: UTC-5 (EST)
  - Summer (DST): UTC-4 (EDT)
- ZIP code: 47106
- Area code: 812
- FIPS code: 18-06634
- GNIS: 2396596
- Website: www.bordenindiana.com

Borden is a town in Wood Township, Clark County, Indiana, United States. The population was 786 at the 2020 census. The town's official name was New Providence until December 29, 1994.

== History ==
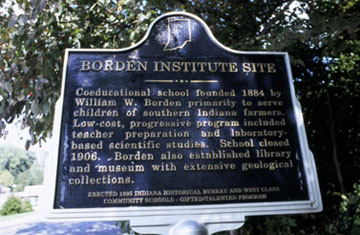
Borden Institute Historical Marker

The town was founded in 1816 by Rhode Islander John Borden and was originally named New Providence, after the Rhode Island capital of Providence. William W. Borden (1823–1906), son of John Borden, was a scholar, philanthropist and distinguished citizen of New Providence and earned his wealth in the Leadville, Colorado, silver mines, becoming one of Clark County's wealthiest citizens.

In 1884, the Borden Institute was founded by William W. Borden as a college for teacher preparation and laboratory-based scientific studies. He also established within the town a library and a museum with an extensive geological collection that later became an important and valuable collection in Chicago's Field Museum following his death. His final crown jewel within the community was his elaborate family mansion situated on a hill overlooking the town. The town honored William W. Borden by unofficially renaming the town and post office Borden because of his generosity and influence within the community his father founded. The Borden Institute closed in 1906 and around 1910 became used as William W. Borden High School, or simply Borden High School. The Institute served this purpose until 1955 when a new elementary and Jr-Sr High School were built adjacent to the institute. The museum still stands and houses some of the original books from the Borden Library and is currently used as a community center. The Borden Mansion also still stands and has been occupied by the Emil Stark family since the early 1970s. Following its use as a high school, the Borden Institute fell into disrepair and was razed in 1983 even after a decade long effort by citizens to preserve it.

Borden is served by the CSX (formally Monon) rail system and was once one of the main loading points for carloads of strawberries shipped by The Borden-Pekin Berry Growers Association north along the Monon Rail. The large volume of strawberries supplied by the area farmers influenced the naming of the athletic teams at Borden High School. The teams were nicknamed the Borden Berries in 1934 and the name was used until 1966 when it was changed by the student body to the Borden Braves. Strawberries continue to be farmed in the Borden area, especially in nearby Starlight, Indiana where the Starlight Strawberry Festival is held each Memorial Day weekend.

A well known establishment in Borden is Brewer's General Store. This family owned store was opened by John Brewer in 1931 and was owned and managed by the extended Brewer family until its closing in 2012. Due to Borden's rural setting, Brewer's took pride in marketing itself as a provider of goods in the scenic "Hillbilly" Valley. Favorites of the store included a large wheel of Wisconsin Rat Trap Cheese, Amish hard candies and Hillbilly Popsickles (large dill pickles served on a wooden stick).

Another popular establishment was George McKinley & Son Hardware Feed Store on Highway 60. McKinley had traded roughly 100 acres on Martinsburg Knob for the store in the 1920s. The pot-belly stove in the center of the store served as a gathering place for community checker matches. A 5' X 10' display window highlighted seasonal goods and was kept up-to-date by granddaughters Joyce (Money) and Marilyn (Riley). The store also provided the community with fuel with its Shell service station. Now there is a Dollar General Store parking lot on that site.

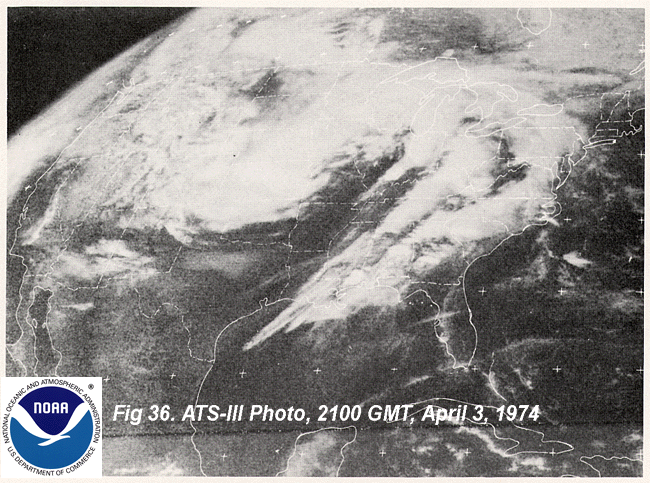
Satellite Super Outbreak 1974-04-03 21 GMT

In the 1960s, several dams were constructed along the tributaries leading to Muddy Fork, which runs through the town. This helped keep Borden from being flooded during heavy rains. On April 3, 1974, an F5 tornado struck the west side of Borden before moving into nearby Daisy Hill, killing one person. On May 27, 2004, an F2 tornado struck the northern edge of the town, doing damage to homes and the trees on the hillside but causing no deaths. On March 2, 2012, an EF4 tornado, hit nearby Pekin and the northern Borden community of Daisy Hill before moving along to Henryville and points further northeast. This tornado did extensive damage to these areas and was responsible for deaths in Pekin, Henryville, and other Indiana towns and counties.

In the early 2000s, William W. Borden High School underwent an expansion project and a new building was built in place of the school parking lot. A new parking lot was then built at the old Borden Park. With the help of donations from the community and the generosity of the Koetter Family of Starlight, the town then built a new Borden Community Park on the East end of Borden near the former Kimball International plant, along Muddy Fork. It includes basketball and tennis courts, a soccer field, a little league baseball complex, a walking path along the fork, and a war memorial for local residents who served in the military. The Borden Valley Day Festival is held in the park annually on the second Saturday in June.

In 2013, Borden High School won its first semi-state and state championships. The Braves beat University in the Semi-State round 47–44 in front of a standing room-only crowd in nearby Seymour, Indiana. On March 23, 2013, the Borden Braves came into Bankers Life Fieldhouse and won their first state championship 55–50. After this state championship run, there was a video made about the Borden Braves titled How 'Bout Them Braves which was the rallying cry of the Borden faithful during the run.

Norman M. Coats of Kirkwood, Missouri has written a book called Growing Up on Daisy Hill, which chronicles his early years being born and raised in the nearby hills and hollows of Borden during the Great Depression. Borden is also the former home of ten-time ARCA champion Frank Kimmel.

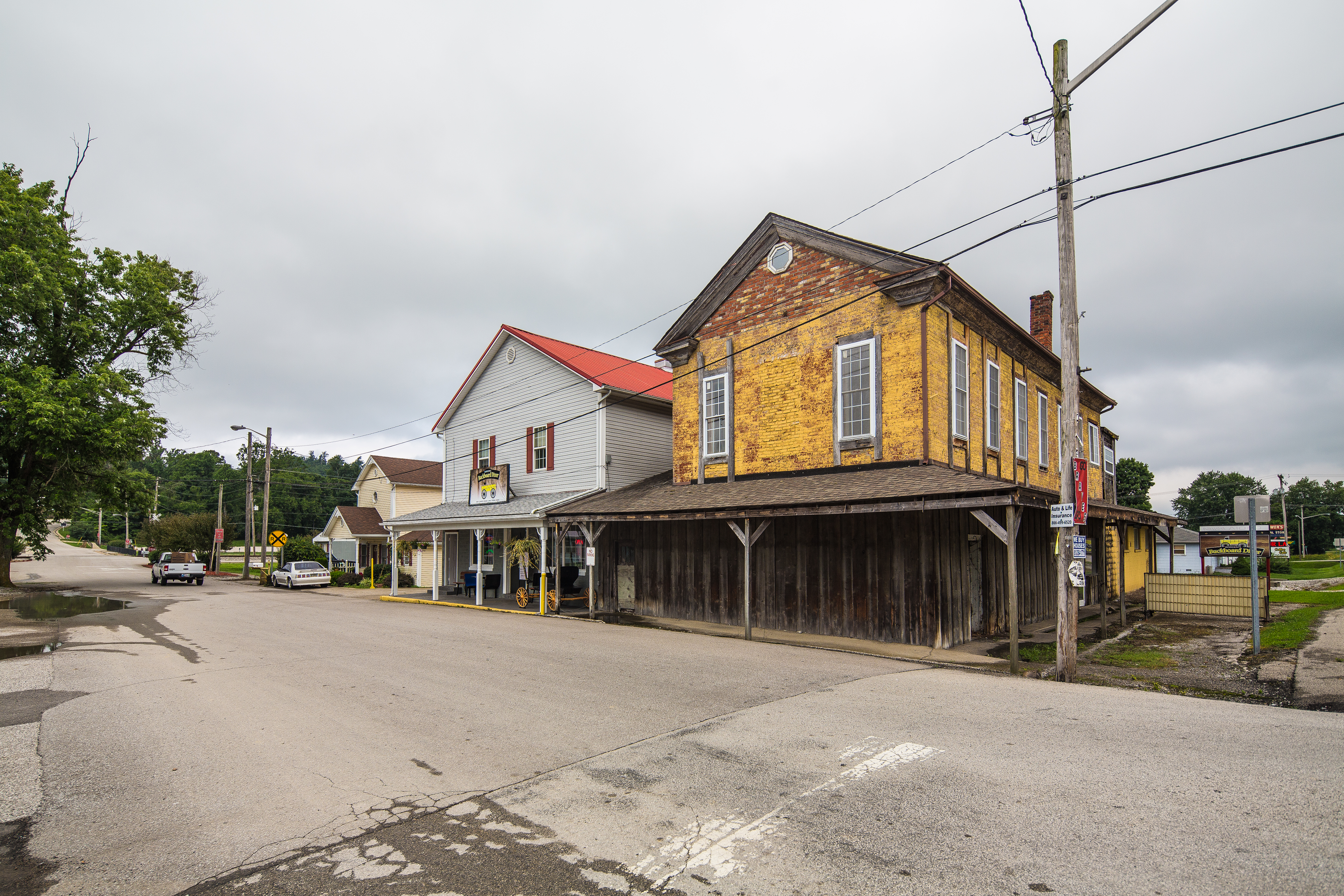
Photo from Small Town Indiana photo survey.

== Geography ==
According to the 2010 census, Borden has a total area of 1.39 square miles (3.60 km^{2}), all land.

== Demographics ==
Historical population
Census	Pop.	Note	%±
1910	350		—
1920	333		−4.9%
1930	358		7.5%
1940	392		9.5%
1950	426		8.7%
1960	327		−23.2%
1970	337		3.1%
1980	384		13.9%
1990	270		−29.7%
2000	818		203.0%
2010	808		−1.2%
2020	786		−2.7%
U.S. Decennial Census

=== 2010 census ===
As of the 2010 census, there were 808 people, 321 households, and 222 families residing in the town. The population density was 581.3 inhabitants per square mile (224.4/km^{2}). There were 356 housing units at an average density of 256.1 per square mile (98.9/km^{2}). The racial makeup of the town was 98.9% White, 0.5% from other races, and 0.6% from two or more races. Hispanic or Latino of any race were 1.1% of the population.

There were 321 households, of which 39.9% had children under the age of 18 living with them, 50.2% were married couples living together, 13.1% had a female householder with no husband present, 5.9% had a male householder with no wife present, and 30.8% were non-families. 25.5% of all households were made up of individuals, and 11.2% had someone living alone who was 65 years of age or older. The average household size was 2.52 and the average family size was 3.04.

The median age in the town was 35.3 years. 26.4% of residents were under the age of 18; 9.6% were between the ages of 18 and 24; 28.9% were from 25 to 44; 22.3% were from 45 to 64; and 12.6% were 65 years of age or older. The gender makeup of the town was 48.5% male and 51.5% female.

=== 2000 census ===
As of the 2000 census, there were 818 people, 331 households, and 231 families residing in the town. The population density was 736.4 inhabitants per square mile (284.3/km^{2}). There were 355 housing units at an average density of 319.6 per square mile (123.4/km^{2}). The racial makeup of the town was 98.41% White, 0.61% Native American, 0.49% Asian, and 0.49% from two or more races. Hispanic or Latino of any race were 0.49% of the population.

There were 331 households, out of which 34.4% had children under the age of 18 living with them, 57.1% were married couples living together, 9.1% had a female householder with no husband present, and 30.2% were non-families. 25.7% of all households were made up of individuals, and 8.2% had someone living alone who was 65 years of age or older. The average household size was 2.47 and the average family size was 2.97.

In the town, the population was spread out, with 26.3% under the age of 18, 9.3% from 18 to 24, 34.2% from 25 to 44, 18.8% from 45 to 64, and 11.4% who were 65 years of age or older. The median age was 33 years. For every 100 females, there were 101.0 males. For every 100 females age 18 and over, there were 95.1 males.

The median income for a household in the town was $40,962, and the median income for a family was $44,868. Males had a median income of $31,250 versus $20,800 for females. The per capita income for the town was $17,417. About 10.3% of families and 11.0% of the population were below the poverty line, including 14.3% of those under age 18 and 19.0% of those age 65 or over.

== Education ==
Borden has a public library, a branch of the Charlestown-Clark County Public Library.
