= New Pekin, Indiana =

- Town
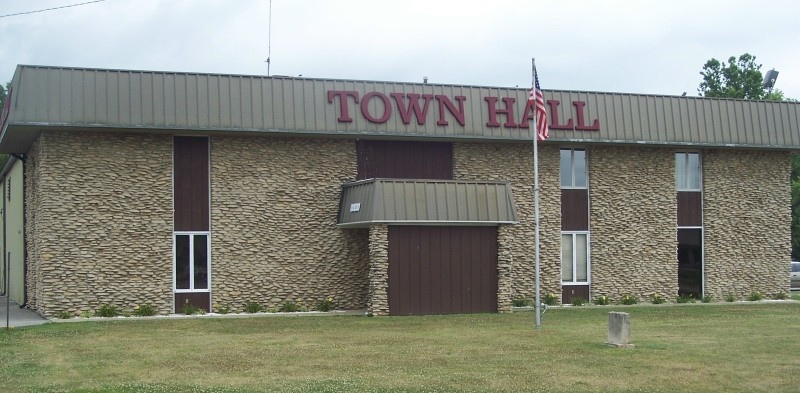
- New Pekin Town Hall

- Location of New Pekin in Washington County, Indiana.
- Coordinates: 38°30′13″N 86°0′53″W
- Country: United States
- State: Indiana
- County: Washington
- Township: Pierce, Polk

Area
  - Total: 2.41 sq mi (6.23 km^{2})
  - Land: 2.38 sq mi (6.17 km^{2})
  - Water: 0.023 sq mi (0.06 km^{2})
- Elevation: 709 ft (216 m)

Population (2020)
  - Total: 1,323
  - Density: 555.3/sq mi (214.39/km^{2})
- Time zone: UTC-5 (Eastern (EST))
  - Summer (DST): UTC-4 (EDT)
- ZIP code: 47165
- Area codes: 812 and 930
- FIPS code: 18-53388
- GNIS feature ID: 440094
- Website: townofnewpekin.com

New Pekin is a town in Pierce and Polk townships, Washington County, Indiana, United States. As of the 2020 census, New Pekin had a population of 1,323.

== History ==
The land for the town of New Pekin was first entered on August 25, 1818. The original town plat was made on December 23, 1883, by W. A. Graves. The town of New Pekin was incorporated in 1903 to provide funds to build and operate a school.

The New Pekin post office has been in operation since 1840.

=== "Old" Pekin ===
On September 29, 1819, Isaac Davis entered section 30 in what was to become Polk Township. Several years later, in 1831, Christian Bixler laid out the town of Pekin on the south side of Mutton Fork, Blue River.

Before 1831, there were several buildings at this location. As early as 1830, stagecoaches were making regular runs between Jeffersonville and Salem. A wagon route between Salem and New Albany also passed through this area. Pekin was a staging stop where horses were watered and changed.

The town prospered until 1851, when the railroad was completed. The train station was built on the more level north side of the Blue River. Businesses gradually migrated to the new location. In 1854 the County Commissioners declared the town vacant and the area became known as Old Pekin.

=== Fourth of July celebration ===
The town of New Pekin claims the distinction of having the oldest consecutive Independence Day celebration in the United States of America. Pekin began celebrating Independence Day in the year 1830. However, Bristol, Rhode Island claims to have celebrated since 1785.

Few historical facts about the earliest celebrations exist, with the information available coming from oral tradition. The first several celebrations were said to be neighborhood affairs, though it is assumed that it did not stay that way for long. Many families lived in the surrounding townships and there were few social activities.

Various sources recount that the celebration was held near Old Pekin from 1830 until 1856. Around 1857, the celebration was moved to near the Blue River, where festivities were held until 1885. In either 1872 or 1873, the picnic was held at the farm of James Campbell, where he had built a recreational area.

The fall of 1884 saw the completion of the fairgrounds. The following year, the celebration was moved to the new fairgrounds. Many local residents did not agree with the celebration being moved there and held a second celebration at Tash Grove.

In 1909, the Gill brothers bought the southern part of the old fairgrounds, which became known as Gill's Grove. This became the present location of the Pekin Community Park, where the celebration has been held every year since.

Today the celebration consists of a fireworks display, a parade, live bands, three-on-three basketball tournament, carnival, food vendors, a flea market, reading of the United States Declaration of Independence, prince and princess contest, horseshoe pitching contest, a queen contest, cookouts and many other small celebrations around the town of Pekin.

Former Indiana Rep. Mike Sodrel said in 2006, “If Norman Rockwell’s America exists anywhere today, it has to be in the 9th District of Indiana. There is nothing that I can think of that is more Americana and Rockwellesque than the Independence Day parade in Pekin.”

=== Morgan's Raid ===
On July 11, 1863, while crossing Blue River near New Pekin, Captain William J. Davis of Morgan's Raid and some of his men were captured by 73rd Indiana Volunteers and a detachment of the 5th U.S. Regulars. Captain Davis and several other soldiers were taken to New Albany, Indiana, and secured in the county jail. Local historians refer to this as the Battle of Oak Ridge (Indiana).

=== 2012 tornado ===
On March 2, 2012, an EF4 tornado hit New Pekin. All five fatalities in Washington County occurred in New Pekin. Debris from New Pekin was found 160 miles away in Pleasant Plain, Ohio.

== Geography ==
New Pekin is located at 38°30′13″N 86°0′53″W (38.503585, -86.014816).

According to the 2010 census, New Pekin has a total area of 2.4 square miles (6.22 km^{2}), of which 2.37 square miles (6.14 km^{2}) (or 98.75%) is land and 0.03 square miles (0.08 km^{2}) (or 1.25%) is water.

=== Climate ===
The climate in this area is characterized by hot, humid summers and generally mild to cool winters. According to the Köppen Climate Classification system, New Pekin has a humid subtropical climate, abbreviated "Cfa" on climate maps.

== Demographics ==
Historical population
Census	Pop.	Note	%±
1910	246		—
1920	356		44.7%
1930	383		7.6%
1940	434		13.3%
1950	543		25.1%
1960	661		21.7%
1970	912		38.0%
1980	1,125		23.4%
1990	1,095		−2.7%
2000	1,334		21.8%
2010	1,401		5.0%
2020	1,323		−5.6%
U.S. Decennial Census

=== 2020 census ===
As of the 2020 census, New Pekin had a population of 1,323. The median age was 38.3 years. 24.0% of residents were under the age of 18 and 15.3% of residents were 65 years of age or older. For every 100 females there were 96.0 males, and for every 100 females age 18 and over there were 95.1 males age 18 and over.

0.0% of residents lived in urban areas, while 100.0% lived in rural areas.

There were 559 households in New Pekin, of which 34.0% had children under the age of 18 living in them. Of all households, 39.2% were married-couple households, 21.6% were households with a male householder and no spouse or partner present, and 30.2% were households with a female householder and no spouse or partner present. About 30.2% of all households were made up of individuals and 9.7% had someone living alone who was 65 years of age or older.

There were 640 housing units, of which 12.7% were vacant. The homeowner vacancy rate was 3.4% and the rental vacancy rate was 15.1%.

Racial composition as of the 2020 census
Race	Number	Percent
White	1,239	93.7%
Black or African American	6	0.5%
American Indian and Alaska Native	2	0.2%
Asian	5	0.4%
Native Hawaiian and Other Pacific Islander	2	0.2%
Some other race	9	0.7%
Two or more races	60	4.5%
Hispanic or Latino (of any race)	27	2.0%

=== 2010 census ===
As of the census of 2010, there were 1,401 people, 563 households, and 383 families residing in the town. The population density was 591.1 inhabitants per square mile (228.2/km^{2}). There were 628 housing units at an average density of 265.0 units per square mile (102.3 units/km^{2}). The racial makeup of the town was 97.1% White, 0.6% African American, 0.2% Native American, 0.1% Asian, 0.1% Pacific Islander, 0.9% from other races, and 1.1% from two or more races. Hispanic or Latino of any race were 2.4% of the population.

There were 563 households, of which 35.7% had children under the age of 18 living with them, 45.1% were married couples living together, 16.0% had a female householder with no husband present, 6.9% had a male householder with no wife present, and 32.0% were non-families. 27.5% of all households were made up of individuals, and 10.3% had someone living alone who was 65 years of age or older. The average household size was 2.49 and the average family size was 2.98.

The median age in the town was 36.8 years. 25.3% of residents were under the age of 18; 9.9% were between the ages of 18 and 24; 25.5% were from 25 to 44; 27.3% were from 45 to 64; and 11.9% were 65 years of age or older. The gender makeup of the town was 48.8% male and 51.2% female.

=== 2000 census ===
As of the census of 2000, there were 1,334 people, 529 households, and 365 families residing in the town. The population density was 571.4 inhabitants per square mile (220.6/km^{2}). There were 571 housing units at an average density of 244.6 units per square mile (94.4 units/km^{2}). The racial makeup of the town was 98.28% White, 0.15% African American, 0.15% Native American, 0.07% Asian, 0.52% from other races, and 0.82% from two or more races. Hispanic or Latino of any race were 1.27% of the population.

There were 529 households, out of which 37.4% had children under the age of 18 living with them, 53.3% were married couples living together, 10.2% had a female householder with no husband present, and 31.0% were non-families. 27.4% of all households were made up of individuals, and 9.5% had someone living alone who was 65 years of age or older. The average household size was 2.52 and the average family size was 3.04.

In the town, the population was spread out, with 26.8% under the age of 18, 10.7% from 18 to 24, 32.8% from 25 to 44, 19.3% from 45 to 64, and 10.3% who were 65 years of age or older. The median age was 33 years. For every 100 females, there were 99.1 males. For every 100 females age 18 and over, there were 94.0 males.

Major ancestry groups reported by New Pekin residents include:

- English - 6.4%
- French - 1.1%
- German - 10.6%
- Hispanic - 1%
- Irish - 10.2%
- Italian - 1%
- Scottish - 2%

The median income for a household in the town was $32,546, and the median income for a family was $34,938. Males had a median income of $26,739 versus $21,346 for females. The per capita income for the town was $14,710. About 11.7% of families and 17.1% of the population were below the poverty line, including 20.3% of those under age 18 and 18.4% of those age 65 or over.

== Education ==
It is in the East Washington School Corporation.
