= Campbellsburg, Indiana =

- Town
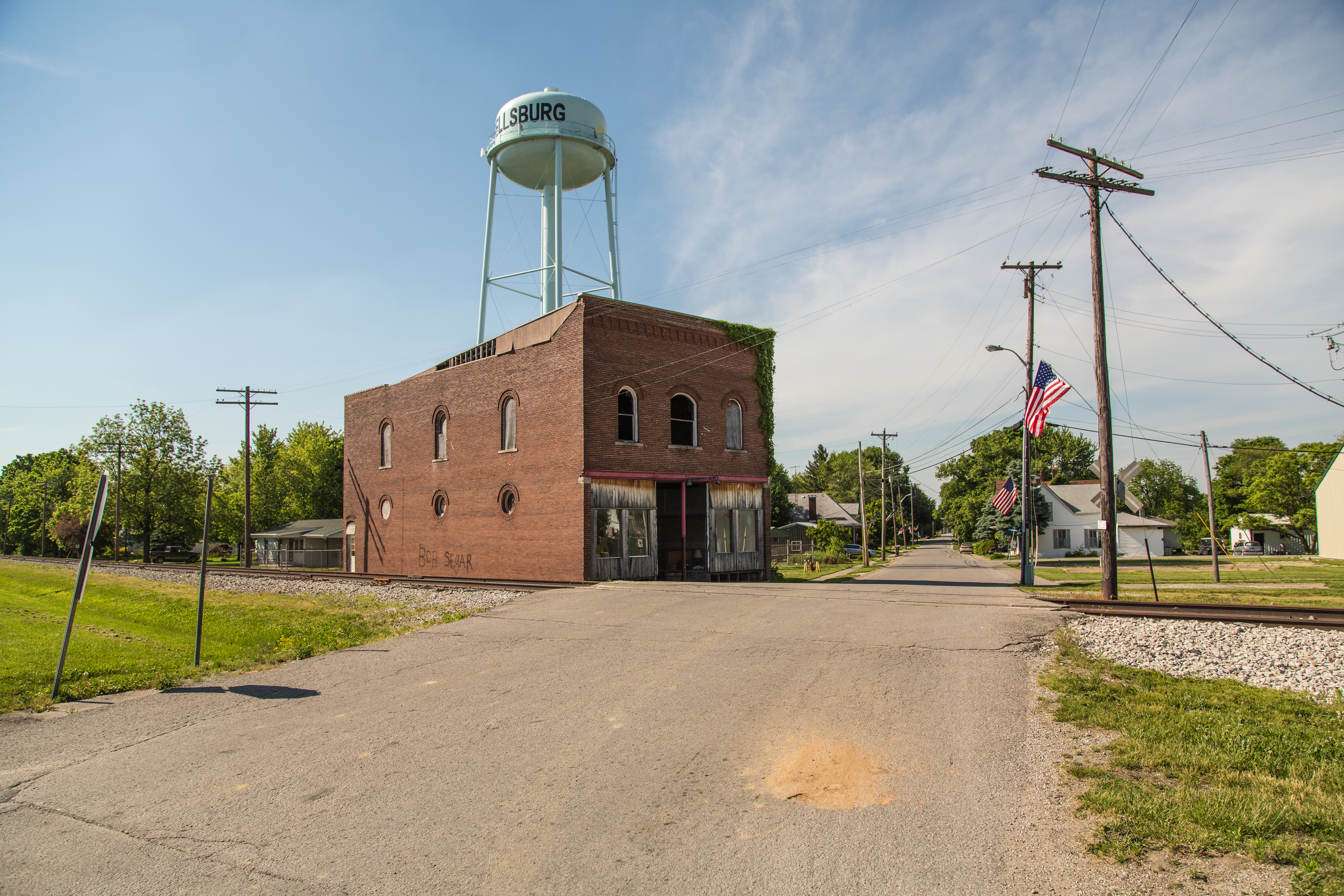

- Location of Campbellsburg in Washington County, Indiana.
- Coordinates: 38°39′05″N 86°15′41″W
- Country: United States
- State: Indiana
- County: Washington
- Township: Brown

Area
  - Total: 0.99 sq mi (2.57 km^{2})
  - Land: 0.99 sq mi (2.57 km^{2})
  - Water: 0.0039 sq mi (0.01 km^{2})
- Elevation: 837 ft (255 m)

Population (2020)
  - Total: 529
  - Density: 533.3/sq mi (205.92/km^{2})
- Time zone: UTC-5 (EST)
  - Summer (DST): UTC-5 (EST)
- ZIP code: 47108
- Area code: 812
- FIPS code: 18-10000
- GNIS feature ID: 2396625
- Website: townofcburg.com

Campbellsburg is a town in Brown Township, Washington County, in the U.S. state of Indiana. As of the 2020 census, Campbellsburg had a population of 529.

== History ==
Campbellsburg was laid out in 1849, when it was certain that the railroad would be built through that territory. It was originally called Buena Vista in commemoration of the Battle of Buena Vista, but was later renamed Campbellsburg for Robert Campbell, who platted an addition to the town in 1851.

The Campbellsburg post office has been in operation since 1852.

== Geography ==
According to the 2010 census, Campbellsburg has a total area of 0.99 square miles (2.56 km^{2}), all land.

== Demographics ==
Historical population
Census	Pop.	Note	%±
1880	386		—
1890	418		8.3%
1900	672		60.8%
1910	666		−0.9%
1920	659		−1.1%
1930	558		−15.3%
1940	608		9.0%
1950	637		4.8%
1960	612		−3.9%
1970	678		10.8%
1980	695		2.5%
1990	606		−12.8%
2000	578		−4.6%
2010	585		1.2%
2020	529		−9.6%
U.S. Decennial Census

=== 2010 census ===
As of the census of 2010, there were 585 people, 228 households, and 150 families living in the town. The population density was 590.9 inhabitants per square mile (228.1/km^{2}). There were 274 housing units at an average density of 276.8 per square mile (106.9/km^{2}). The racial makeup of the town was 98.5% White, 0.2% African American, 0.3% Asian, and 1.0% from two or more races. Hispanic or Latino of any race were 1.0% of the population.

There were 228 households, of which 37.7% had children under the age of 18 living with them, 43.0% were married couples living together, 18.9% had a female householder with no husband present, 3.9% had a male householder with no wife present, and 34.2% were non-families. 26.3% of all households were made up of individuals, and 9.6% had someone living alone who was 65 years of age or older. The average household size was 2.57 and the average family size was 3.12.

The median age in the town was 34.4 years. 30.1% of residents were under the age of 18; 8.7% were between the ages of 18 and 24; 23.4% were from 25 to 44; 25.7% were from 45 to 64; and 12.1% were 65 years of age or older. The gender makeup of the town was 49.1% male and 50.9% female.

=== 2000 census ===
As of the census of 2000, there were 578 people, 232 households, and 141 families living in the town. The population density was 591.2 inhabitants per square mile (228.3/km^{2}). There were 270 housing units at an average density of 276.2 per square mile (106.6/km^{2}). The racial makeup of the town was 98.96% White, and 1.04% from two or more races. Hispanic or Latino of any race were 0.87% of the population.

There were 232 households, out of which 31.0% had children under the age of 18 living with them, 46.1% were married couples living together, 10.8% had a female householder with no husband present, and 38.8% were non-families. 32.3% of all households were made up of individuals, and 13.8% had someone living alone who was 65 years of age or older. The average household size was 2.49 and the average family size was 3.23.

In the town, the population was spread out, with 29.2% under the age of 18, 10.9% from 18 to 24, 26.1% from 25 to 44, 20.9% from 45 to 64, and 12.8% who were 65 years of age or older. The median age was 33 years. For every 100 females, there were 104.2 males. For every 100 females age 18 and over, there were 95.7 males.

The median income for a household in the town was $23,438, and the median income for a family was $38,750. Males had a median income of $25,375 versus $22,344 for females. The per capita income for the town was $13,672. About 14.7% of families and 15.3% of the population were below the poverty line, including 14.9% of those under age 18 and 13.6% of those age 65 or over.

== Education ==
It is in the West Washington School Corporation.
