= Henryville, Indiana =

- Census-designated place
- Location of Henryville in Clark County, Indiana.
- Coordinates: 38°32′18″N 85°45′20″W
- Country: United States
- State: Indiana
- County: Clark
- Township: Monroe

Area
  - Total: 2.83 sq mi (7.33 km^{2})
  - Land: 2.83 sq mi (7.32 km^{2})
  - Water: 0.0039 sq mi (0.01 km^{2})
- Elevation: 495 ft (151 m)

Population (2020)
  - Total: 1,878
  - Density: 664.7/sq mi (256.64/km^{2})
- Time zone: UTC-5 (EST)
  - Summer (DST): UTC-4 (EDT)
- ZIP code: 47126
- Area code: 812
- FIPS code: 18-33142
- GNIS feature ID: 2393047

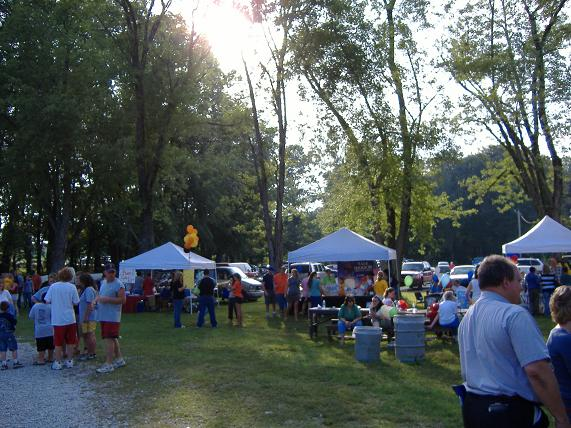
Festival in Henryville, 2006

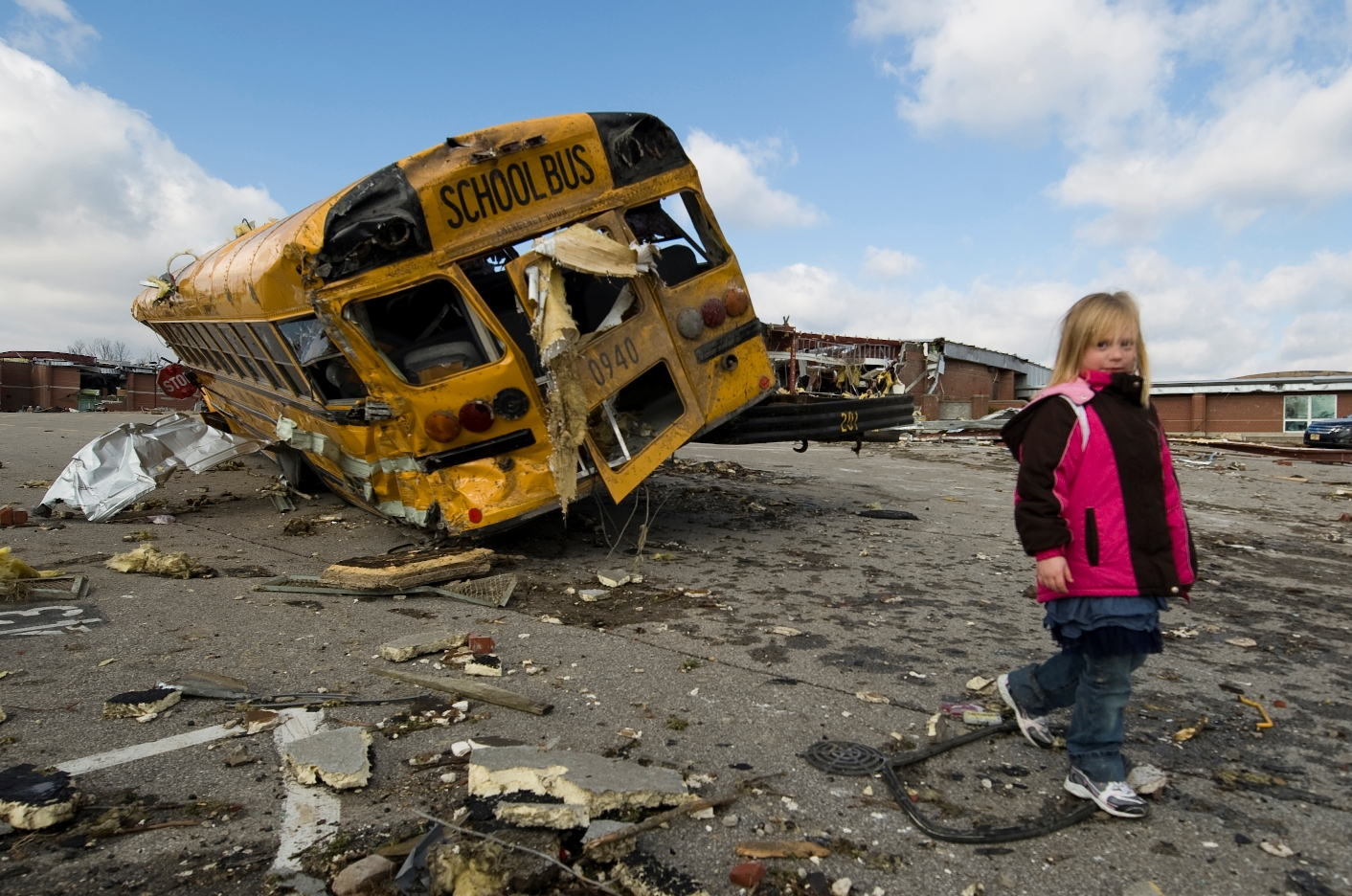
A young girl walks the parking lot of her elementary school in Henryville after the March 2012 tornado.

Henryville is a census-designated place (CDP) in Monroe Township, Clark County, in the U.S. state of Indiana. As of the 2020 census, Henryville had a population of 1,878.

Henryville is home to Indiana's oldest state forest, Clark State Forest, and birthplace of entrepreneur Colonel Harland Sanders, whose iconic image appears in the Kentucky Fried Chicken logo and Grammy award-winning bluegrass fiddle player Michael Cleveland.

== History ==
In 1850, the village of Morristown was established. It was renamed Henryville in 1853 to honor Colonel Henry Ferguson, who was once a colonel in the Pennsylvania militia. He purchased the land on which Henryville was established, and helped persuade Pennsylvania Railroad officials to run the line through Clark County. The Henryville post office was established in 1865.

=== 2012 tornado ===
At approximately 3:15 p.m. (EST) on March 2, 2012, an EF4 tornado caused extensive damage to Henryville, killing one person. It was on the ground for more than 50 miles. The storm destroyed Henryville Elementary School and Henryville Jr/Sr High School.

== Geography ==
According to the United States Census Bureau, the CDP has an area of 2.9 square miles (7.5 km^{2}), all land.

=== Climate ===
The climate in this area is characterized by hot, humid summers and generally mild to cool winters. According to the Köppen Climate Classification system, Henryville has a humid subtropical climate, abbreviated "Cfa" on climate maps.

== Demographics ==
Historical population
Census	Pop.	Note	%±
2000	1,545		—
2010	1,905		23.3%
2020	1,878		−1.4%
U.S. Decennial Census

=== 2020 census ===
As of the 2020 census, Henryville had a population of 1,878. The median age was 34.8 years. 26.1% of residents were under the age of 18 and 14.0% of residents were 65 years of age or older. For every 100 females there were 95.4 males, and for every 100 females age 18 and over there were 89.4 males age 18 and over.

0.0% of residents lived in urban areas, while 100.0% lived in rural areas.

There were 737 households in Henryville, of which 35.1% had children under the age of 18 living in them. Of all households, 49.4% were married-couple households, 16.3% were households with a male householder and no spouse or partner present, and 25.1% were households with a female householder and no spouse or partner present. About 22.4% of all households were made up of individuals and 8.5% had someone living alone who was 65 years of age or older.

There were 772 housing units, of which 4.5% were vacant. The homeowner vacancy rate was 2.9% and the rental vacancy rate was 0.9%.

Racial composition as of the 2020 census
Race	Number	Percent
White	1,746	93.0%
Black or African American	18	1.0%
American Indian and Alaska Native	2	0.1%
Asian	1	0.1%
Native Hawaiian and Other Pacific Islander	1	0.1%
Some other race	11	0.6%
Two or more races	99	5.3%
Hispanic or Latino (of any race)	31	1.7%

=== 2000 census ===
As of the census of 2000, there were 1,545 people, 583 households, and 434 families residing in the CDP. The population density was 535.6 inhabitants per square mile (206.8/km^{2}). There were 609 housing units at an average density of 211.1 per square mile (81.5/km^{2}). The racial makeup of the CDP was 99.16% White, 0.06% African American, 0.13% Native American, 0.26% Asian, and 0.39% from two or more races. Hispanic or Latino of any race were 0.26% of the population.

There were 583 households, out of which 38.1% had children under the age of 18 living with them, 58.8% were married couples living together, 11.0% had a female householder with no husband present, and 25.4% were non-families. 21.6% of all households were made up of individuals, and 7.9% had someone living alone who was 65 years of age or older. The average household size was 2.65 and the average family size was 3.07.

In the CDP, the population was spread out, with 26.1% under the age of 18, 10.4% from 18 to 24, 32.6% from 25 to 44, 22.1% from 45 to 64, and 8.7% who were 65 years of age or older. The median age was 34 years. For every 100 females, there were 97.1 males. For every 100 females age 18 and over, there were 96.4 males.

The median income for a household in the CDP was $49,405, and the median income for a family was $55,000. Males had a median income of $38,938 versus $22,043 for females. The per capita income for the CDP was $17,745. About 6.2% of families and 4.9% of the population were below the poverty line, including none of those under age 18 and 27.0% of those age 65 or over.

== Education ==
Henryville has an elementary, and junior/senior high school.

Henryville has a public library, a branch of the Charlestown-Clark County Public Library.

== Infrastructure ==
=== Highway ===
Interstate 65 passes north–south through the west side of Henryville and roughly parallels the older U.S. Route 31. Indiana State Road 160 intersects the previous two roads in Henryville.

=== Rail ===
The Louisville & Indiana Railroad runs north–south through Henryville and roughly parallels U.S. Route 31.
