= East Central Conference (IHSAA) =

Athletic conference in Eastern Indiana

The East Central Conference was an athletic conference from 1947 to 1969 based in Eastern Indiana, considered one of the regional superconferences in the state. The conference began with 12 schools, though had turnover within its first year, mainly having to do with gym issues.

Pendleton and Greenfield, larger schools, refused to play in Cambridge City's gym, deeming it too small to play in. The conference felt otherwise, and forced the two schools out of the conference. Williamsburg, on the other hand, had the opposite problem; its gym was found to be too small for conference play, and moved them out as well. To fill their spots, the conference recruited Milroy, Morristown, and Morton Memorial to join the fold.

While the conference did grow to 13 schools, by 1956 it had started to splinter. Three schools left to found the Eastern Indiana Athletic Conference in 1956, while in 1962 four schools left to help found the Tri-Eastern Conference. The formation of the TEC in 1962 almost caused the ECC to fold, as it was left with five members. However, the Hancock County Conference's six schools were merged into the fold, giving the conference new life. However, the conference did not have long, as the formation of the Big Blue River Conference left the conference with three schools by 1968, two of which were scheduled to be closed at the end of the 1968–69 school year. The sole remaining member, Morton Memorial, opted to join the BBRC that next year.

== Membership ==
School	Location	Mascot	Colors	County	Year joined	Previous conference	Year left	Conference joined
Brookville	Brookville	Greyhounds		24; Franklin	1947	Whitewater Valley	1956	Eastern Indiana
Cambridge City	Cambridge; City	Wampus Cats		89; Wayne	1947	Wayne County	1956	Eastern Indiana
Centerville	Centerville	Bulldogs		89; Wayne	1947	Wayne County	1962	Tri-Eastern
Farmland	Farmland	Wildcats		68; Randolph	1947	Randolph County	1956	Randolph County
Greenfield	Greenfield	Tigers		30; Hancock	1947	Hancock County	1948	Hancock County
Hagerstown	Hagerstown	Tigers		89; Wayne	1947	Wayne County	1956	Eastern Indiana
Knightstown	Knightstown	Panthers^{1}		33; Henry	1947	Henry County	1962	Tri-Eastern
Liberty^{2}	Liberty	Lancers		81; Union	1947	Whitewater Valley	1962	Tri-Eastern
Pendleton	Pendleton	Irish		30; Madison	1947	Independents	1948	Independents
Spiceland	Spiceland	Stingers		33; Henry	1947	Henry County	1968	none (consolidated into Tri)
Union City; Community^{3}	Union; City	Indians^{4}		68; Randolph	1947	Randolph County	1962	Tri-Eastern
Williamsburg	Williamsburg	Yellow Jackets		89; Wayne	1947	Wayne County	1948	Wayne County
Milroy	Milroy	Cardinals		70; Rush	1948	Rush County	1968	none (consolidated into Rushville)
Morristown	Morristown	Yellow Jackets		73; Shelby	1948		1968	Big Blue River
Morton Memorial	Knightstown	Lions		70; Rush	1948	Rush County	1969	Big Blue River
Middletown	Middletown	Cossacks		33; Henry	1952	Henry County	1955	White River
Carthage	Carthage	Blue Raiders		70; Rush	1956	Rush County	1969	none (consolidated Knightstown)
Charlottesville	Charlottesville	Eagles		30; Hancock	1962	Hancock County	1964	none (consolidated into Eastern Hancock)
Hancock Central	Maxwell	Panthers		30; Hancock	1962	Hancock County	1969	none (consolidated into Greenfield Central)
Mount Comfort	Mount Comfort	Buccaneers		30; Hancock	1962	Hancock County	1963	none (consolidated into Mount Vernon)
New; Palestine	New Palestine	Dragons		30; Hancock	1962	Hancock County	1968	Big Blue River
Vernon Township	Fortville	Vikings		30; Hancock	1962	Hancock County	1963	none (consolidated into Mount Vernon)
Wilkinson	Wilkinson	Bulldogs		30; Hancock	1962	Hancock County	1964	none (consolidated into Eastern Hancock)
Mount Vernon	Fortville	Marauders		30; Hancock	1963	none (new school)	1968	White River
Eastern; Hancock	Charlottesville	Royals		30; Hancock	1964	none (new school)	1968	Big Blue River

1. Team name was Falcons before 1957.
2. Liberty played in both the ECC and WVC from 1947 until it left for the Tri-Eastern Conference in 1962.
3. Known as West Side before 1957.
4. Team name was Wildcats before 1957.

== Boys' Basketball Conference Champions ==
#	Team	Seasons
4	Morristown	1958, 1960*, 1963*, 1966
2	Centerville	?, 1953
2	Middletown	1954, 1956
1	Cambridge City	1952
1	Liberty	1955
1	Milroy	1963*
1	Morton Memorial	1960*
1	New Palestine	1967
0	Brookville	
0	Carthage	
0	Charlottesville	
0	Eastern Hancock	
0	Farmland	
0	Greenfield	
0	Hagerstown	
0	Hancock Central	
0	Knightstown	
0	Mount Comfort	
0	Mount Vernon	
0	Pendleton	
0	Spiceland	
0	Union City	
0	Vernon Township	
0	Wilkinson	
0	Williamsburg	

- Titles from 1948 to 1951, 1957, 1959, 1961–62, 1964–65, 1968-69 are unverified.
