= Whitewater Valley Conference =

The Whitewater Valley Conference was an IHSAA-sanctioned conference based in Fayette, Franklin, Union, and later Henry and Wayne counties in East Central Indiana. The conference was founded in 1940 as a merger of the Franklin County Conference and Union County Conference, though because two of the FCC schools were not able to play a full conference schedule in the 1940–41 school year, two Fayette County Conference schools were added. The conference's last season was in 1967–68, as the consolidation wave of the 1950s and 1960s would leave the conference with three schools and no suitable replacements in the area, as Lewisville and Straughn became part of Tri in 1968. College Corner, whose location on the border of Indiana and Ohio allowed them to play in both the WVC and the Preble County League in Ohio, would continue to play in the PCL until joining with Short in Liberty to form Union County High School in 1974. Whitewater Township would merge into Brookville that same year. Laurel struggled on as an independent for two decades, as they were too far from the two conferences in the general region that featured schools of a similar size and sports offering, the Mid-Hoosier and Ohio River Valley conferences. The school eventually consolidated with Brookville to form Franklin County High School in 1989.

== Membership ==
School	Location	Mascot	Colors	County	Year joined	Previous conference	Year left	Conference joined
Alquina^{1}	Alquina	Blue Arrows		21; Fayette	1940	Fayette County	1966	none (consolidated into Connersville)
Brookville^{2}	Brookville	Greyhounds		24; Franklin	1940	Franklin County/ Southeastern Indiana	1947	East Central
Brownsville	Brownsville	Lions		81; Union	1940	Union County	1961	none (consolidated into Liberty)
College Corner^{3}	College Corner	Trojans		81; Union	1940	Preble County (OH)/ Union County	1968	Preble County (OH)
Harrisburg^{1}	Harrisburg	Hornets		21; Fayette	1940	Fayette County	1958	none (consolidated into Fayette Central)
Kitchel	Kitchel	Cowboys		81; Union	1940	Union County	1961	none (consolidated into Liberty)
Liberty^{4}	Liberty	Lancers		81; Union	1940	Union County	1962	Tri-Eastern
Springfield Township^{2}	Mount Carmel	Cardinals		24; Franklin	1940	Union County	1961	none (consolidated into Whitewater Township)
Laurel	Laurel	Panthers		24; Franklin	1941	Franklin County	1968	Independents (closed 1989)
Whitewater Township	Rockdale	Elkhorns		24; Franklin	1941	Franklin County	1968	Independents (closed 1974)
Fayette Central	Harrisburg	Chiefs		21; Fayette	1958	none (new school)	1966	none (consolidated into Connersville)
Milton	Milton	Sharpshooters		89; Wayne	1962	Wayne County	1965	none (consolidated into Lincoln)
Webster-Williamsburg	Williamsburg	Yellow Jackets		89; Wayne	1964	none (new school)	1967	none (consolidated into Northeastern)
Whitewater-Fountain City	Fountain; City	Bearcats		89; Wayne	1964	none (new school)	1967	none (consolidated into Northeastern)
Straughn	Straughn	Indians		33; Henry	1966	Henry County	1968	none (consolidated into Tri)
Lewisville	Lewisville	Bears		33; Henry	1967	Henry County	1968	none (consolidated into Tri)

1. Alquina and Harrisburg played concurrently in the WVC and FCC 1940–58.
2. Brookville and Springfield Township played concurrently in the WVC and FCC 1940–41.
3. College Corner played in both the WVC and Ohio's Preble County League throughout the WVC's existence. When the WVC folded, they remained in the PCL until consolidating into Union County in 1974.
4. Liberty played concurrently in the WVC and the ECC from 1947 to 1962.
