= Mid-Indiana Football Conference =

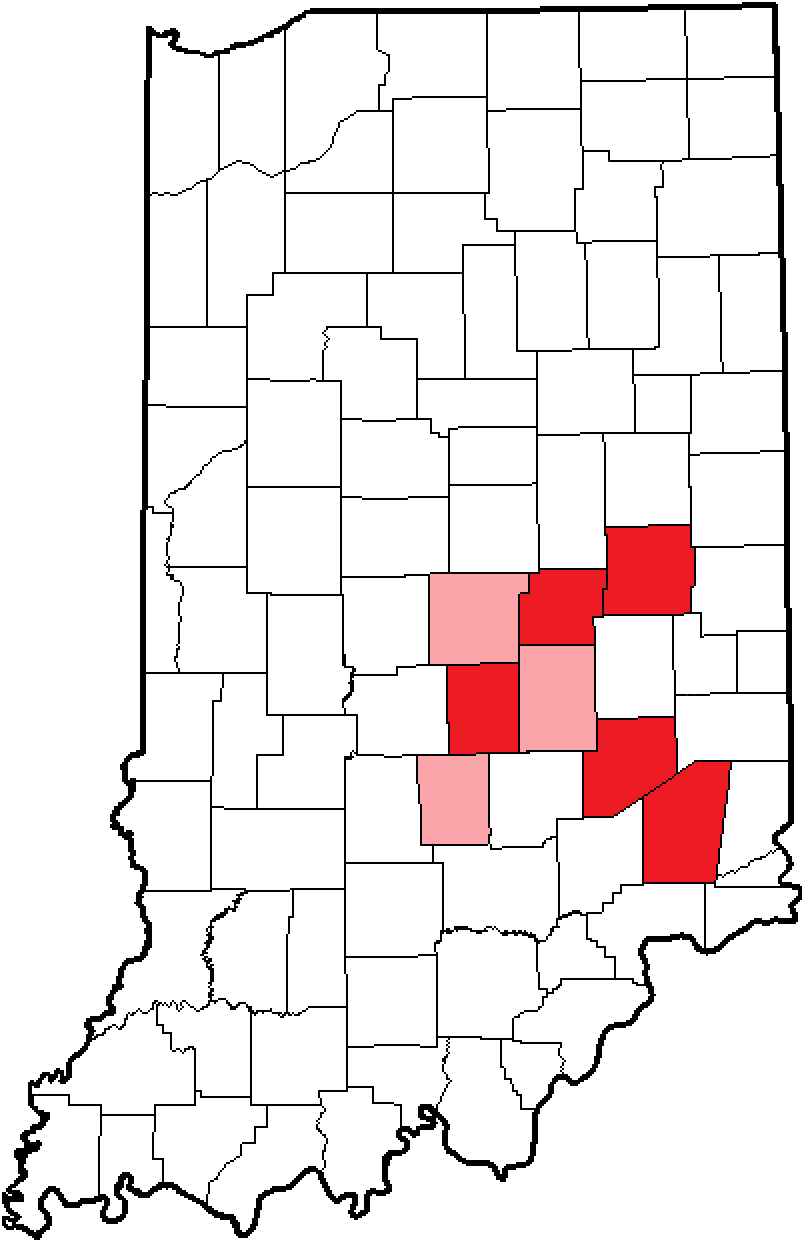
The Mid-Indiana Football Conference within Indiana

Mid-Indiana Football Conference is a six-member Indiana High School Athletic Association sanctioned football-only Conference in South Central and Southeast Indiana.

== Members ==
School	Location	Mascot	Colors	Enrollment	IHSAA Class	County	Year joined	Previous conference	Primary Conference
Edinburgh^{1}	Edinburgh	Lancers		269	A	30; Johnson	1981; 2016	Independents; Independents	Mid-Hoosier
Milan^{2}	Milan	Indians		411	AA	41; Ripley	1981	Eastern Indiana	Ohio River Valley
North Decatur	Greensburg	Chargers		329	A	33; Decatur	1982	Big Blue River	Mid-Hoosier
Oldenburg Academy	Oldenburg	Twisters		210	A	24; Franklin	2016	Independents	Independents
South; Decatur	Westport	Cougars		313	A	16; Decatur	1981	Independents	Mid-Hoosier
Switzerland; County	Vevay	Pacers		404	AA	16; Switzerland	2016	Independents	Ohio River Valley

1. Edinburgh played from 2011 until 2016 as an independent.
2. Milan played concurrently in the EIAC and MIFC for the 1981 season.

== Former members ==
School	Location	Mascot	Colors	County	Year joined	Previous conference	Year left	Conference joined
Brown; County	Nashville	Eagles		7 Brown	1981	Independents	1991	Independents (WIC 1999)
Indian Creek	Trafalgar	Braves		41; Johnson	1981	Independents	2016	Western Indiana
Park Tudor	Indianapolis	Panthers		49; Marion	1982; 1990	Independents; Independents	1986; 2005	Independents; Indiana Crossroads
Triton; Central	Fairland	Tigers		73; Shelby	1996	Rangeline	2012	Indiana Crossroads
Eastern Hancock	Charlottesville	Royals		41; Hancock	2012	Independents (WRC 2010)	2016	Independents
Knightstown	Knightstown	Panthers		41; Henry	2013	Independents (WRC 2010)	2011	Independents (TEC 2017)

== Champions ==
#	Team	Seasons
12	Indian Creek	1984, 1997*, 1998*, 2001, 2002, 2004, 2005, 2008*, 2009, 2010, 2012, 2014
12	Milan	1981*^{1}, 1983, 1992, 1994, 1995, 1997*, 1998*, 1999*, 2008*, 2011, 2016, 2017
4	Park Tudor	1985, 1993, 1999*, 2000
4	South Decatur	1989, 1990, 1997*, 2003
5	Triton Central	1996, 1997*, 2006, 2007, 2008*
4	Brown County	1981*^{1}, 1986, 1987, 1988
3	North Decatur	1982^{2}, 1991, 1998*
2	Eastern Hancock	2013, 2015
0	Edinburgh	
0	Knightstown	
0	Oldenburg	
0	Switzerland County	

1. Milan and Brown County both finished with 2–0 records in a partial schedule. Edinburgh was the only team to play a full schedule.
2. North Decatur (5–1) and Indian Creek (4–1) both finished with one loss, but Indian Creek and Milan didn't play. North Decatur won the title based on beating Indian Creek.

== Resources ==
- IHSAA Conferences
- IHSAA Directory
