= Big Blue River Conference =

IHSAA-mandated conference featured schools from North Central and East Central Indiana

The Big Blue River Conference was an IHSAA-mandated conference featuring schools from North Central and East Central Indiana. It operated from the 1968–69 school year until 1988–89. Five of the original seven schools came from the East Central Conference, four directly, while Tri was formed from the consolidation of ECC member Spiceland. Morton Memorial, the last remaining ECC member in 1969, would join the conference that year, along with Hamilton Southeastern. The nine school format did not last long, as Morton Memorial left after one season, and Hamilton Southeastern had outgrown the conference and left by 1972. The conference briefly returned to nine schools in 1977, as Lapel and Shenandoah joined from the folding White River Conference. However, North Decatur left three years later, as the new expansion left them geographically isolated. Morristown would follow suit in 1985, as the school dropped football. The conference would split in 1989, as Lapel and Shenandoah would help reform the WRC, New Palestine and Triton Central would move to the Rangeline Conference, and Tri was accepted into the Tri-Eastern Conference. Knightstown and Eastern Hancock were left as independents, though both would join the WRC six and eight years later, respectively.

== Former members ==
School	Location	Mascot	Colors	County	Year Joined	Previous Conference	Year Left	Conference Joined
Eastern; Hancock	Charlottesville	Royals		30; Hancock	1968	East Central	1989	Independents (WRC 1997)
Knightstown	Knightstown	Panthers		33; Henry	1968	Tri-Eastern	1989	Independents (WRC 1995)
Morristown	Morristown	Yellow Jackets		73; Shelby	1968	East Central	1985	Mid-Hoosier
New; Palestine	New Palestine	Dragons		30; Hancock	1968	East Central	1989	Rangeline
North; Decatur	Greensburg	Chargers		16; Decatur	1968	none (new school)	1980	Mid-Hoosier
Tri	Lewisville	Titans		33; Henry	1968	none (new school)	1989	Tri-Eastern
Triton; Central	Fairland	Tigers		73; Shelby	1968	Mid-Hoosier	1989	Rangeline
Hamilton; Southeastern	Fishers	Royals		29; Hamilton	1969	Mid-Capital	1972	Rangeline
Morton Memorial	Knightstown	Lions		70; Rush	1969	East Central	1970	Independents (closed 2009)
Lapel	Lapel	Bulldogs		48; Madison	1977	White River	1989	White River
Shenandoah	Middletown	Raiders		33; Henry	1977	White River	1989	White River
