= Mid-Eastern Conference =

High school sports conference in Indiana

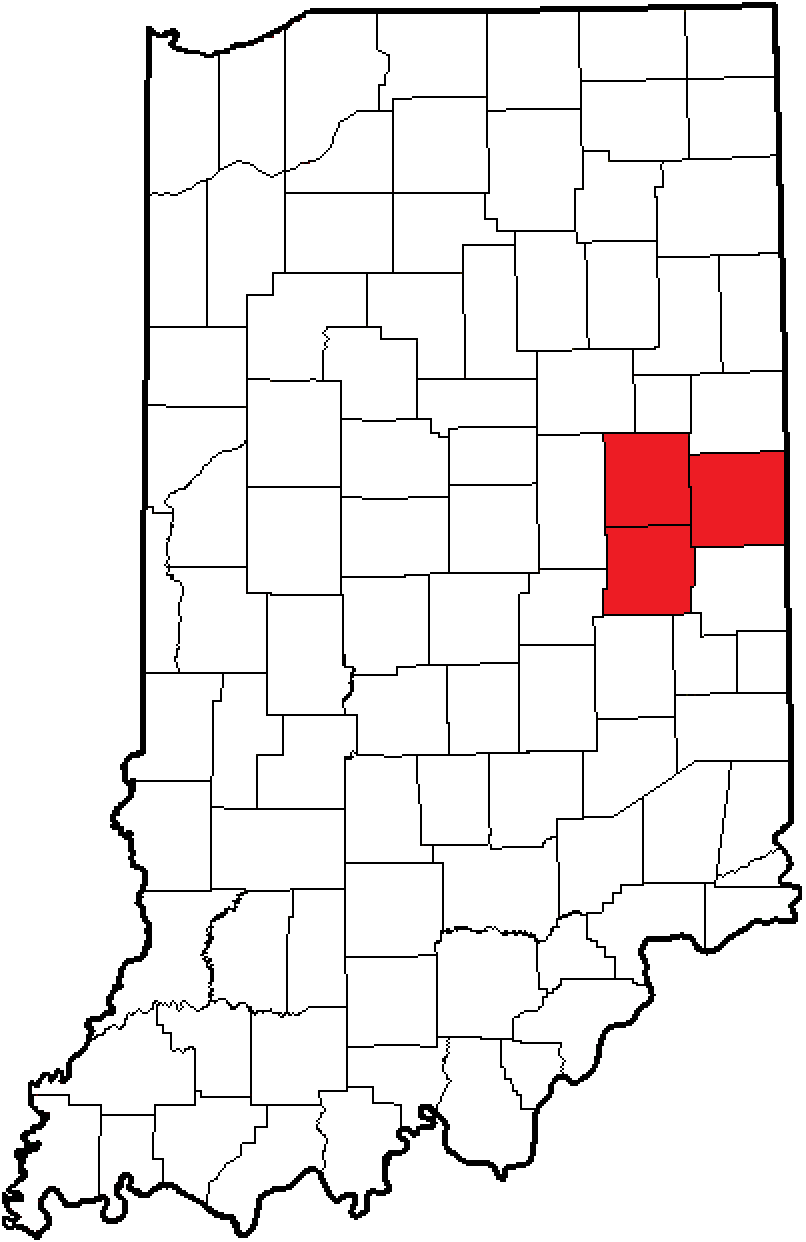
The Mid-Eastern Conference in Indiana

The Mid-Eastern Conference is an IHSAA-sanctioned conference in East Central Indiana. The conference formed in 1963 as schools from Delaware, Henry, and Randolph counties banded together with impending consolidations making their conference situations unstable. The conference has never been stable for long, varying between six and eight members between 1963 and 1977, and having as many as ten members since. While schools from Hancock, Madison and Wayne counties have participated, the conference has generally stayed within its original footprint. The league once again grew to ten members as Eastern Hancock and Shenandoah joined.

== Current members ==
School	Location	Mascot	Colors	Enrollment 24–25	IHSAA Class	IHSAA Class Football	# / County	Year joined	Previous Conference	Gym Capacity
Blue River; Valley^{1}	Mt. Summit	Vikings		200	1A	-	33; Henry	1964	none (new school)	2,400
Cowan	Cowan	Blackhawks		231	1A	-	18; Delaware	1963	Delaware County	2,000
Daleville	Daleville	Broncos		287	1A	-	18; Delaware	1963	Delaware County	2,050
Eastern; Hancock	Charlottesville	Royals		377	2A	2A	30; Hancock	2017	Independents (MHC 2016)	1,370
Monroe; Central	Parker City	Golden Bears		301	1A	1A	68; Randolph	1964	none (new school)	2,250
Randolph; Southern	Lynn	Rebels		144	1A	-	68; Randolph	1964	none (new school)	2,300
Shenandoah	Middletown	Raiders		400	2A	2A	33; Henry	2017	Independents (WRC 2010)	2,500
Union (Modoc)^{2}	Modoc	Rockets		87	1A	-	68; Randolph	1963	none (new school)	1,963
Wapahani	Selma	Raiders		334	2A	-	18; Delaware	1968	none (new school)	1,725
Wes-Del^{3}	Gaston	Warriors		248	1A	1A	18; Delaware	1977; 2008	White River; White River	2,000

1. Concurrent with HCC 1964–67.
2. Concurrent with Randolph County Conference 1963–64.
3. Wes-Del played from 1989 to 2008 in the second incarnation of the WRC.
4. North Decatur participated in the MEC as a Football-Only member from 2021 to 2024.
5. Eastern Hancock High School and Shenandoah High School (Indiana) recently announced their intentions to leave the Mid-Eastern Conference to join the newly formed Eastern Crossroads Conference at a date to be determined.

=== Former members ===
School	Location	Mascot	Colors	# / County	Year joined	Previous conference	Year left	Conference joined
Cadiz^{1}	Cadiz	Spaniards		33; Henry	1963	Henry County	1967	none (consolidated into Shenandoah)
Mooreland^{2}	Mooreland	Bobcats		33; Henry	1963	Henry County	1964	none (consolidated into Blue River Valley)
Mt. Summit^{2}	Mt. Summit	Eagles		33; Henry	1963	Henry County	1964	none (consolidated into Blue River Valley)
Northeastern	Fountain; City	Knights		89; Wayne	1967	none (new school)	1974	Tri-Eastern
Frankton	Frankton	Eagles		48; Madison	1977	White River	1989	White River
Muncie Burris	Muncie	Owls		18; Delaware	1979	Central Indiana	2014	Independents (Pioneer 2015)

1. Concurrent with HCC 1963–67.
2. Concurrent with HCC 1963–64.

== Sports ==
- Baseball
- Boys' Basketball
- Girls' Basketball
- Boys' Cross Country
- Girls' Cross Country
- Boys' Golf
- Girls' Golf
- Softball
- Boys' Track and Field
- Girls' Track and Field
- Volleyball
- Wrestling
- Cheerleading
- **Football was played as an MEC sport from 2018 to 2024.**

== Conference Champions ==
=== Boys' Basketball ===
#	Team	Seasons
14	Blue River Valley	1965, 1966, 1995*, 1998, 1999, 2000, 2001, 2002, 2005, 2006, 2007, 2010, 2011, 2012
12	Wapahani	1994, 1997, 2008*, 2009, 2013, 2014, 2015, 2016*, 2017, 2023, 2024, 2025
8	Monroe Central	1968, 1977, 1979, 1980, 1983, 1996*, 2008*, 2022
7	Randolph Southern	1971, 1972, 1973, 1974, 1982, 1990**,1995*
4	Shenandoah	2018*, 2019, 2020, 2021
4	Muncie Burris	1978, 1990**, 2003, 2004
2	Cowan	1996*, 2016*
1	Eastern Hancock	2018*
0	Daleville	1969, 1975
0	Frankton	
0	Northeastern	
0	Union (M)	
0	Wes-Del	

- Titles for 1966-93 are unconfirmed.
  - Muncie Burris & Randolph Southern tied in 1990 for the conference championship.

=== Girls' Basketball ===
#	Team	Seasons
16	Randolph Southern	1980, 1990, 1991, 1992, 2003, 2004, 2005*, 2006*, 2007*, 2008, 2010, 2011, 2012*, 2013, 2014, 2015*
9	Monroe Central	1980, 1983, 1984, 2005*, 2009, 2016, 2017, 2018, 2019
8	Blue River Valley	1977, 1978, 1979, 1985, 1986, 2001, 2002, 2006*
4	Eastern Hancock	2023, 2024, 2025, 2026
4	Wapahani	2005*, 2007*, 2012*, 2015*
1	Shenandoah	2020
1	Union (M)	2015*
0	Cowan	
0	Daleville	
0	Burris	
0	Frankton	
0	Wes-Del	

- Titles for 1979-84 and 1986-2001 are unconfirmed.

=== Boys cross country ===
#	Team	Seasons
17	Wapahani	1971, 1974, 1981, 1982, 1984, 2004, 2005, 2014, 2015, 2017, 2019, 2021, 2022, 2023, 2024, 2025
13	Muncie Burris	1977, 1978, 1983, 1985, 1987, 1988, 1989, 1990, 1995, 2000, 2001, 2002, 2003
10	Daleville	1963, 1964, 1965, 1966, 1967, 1973, 1975, 1976, 1996, 1997, 1998
8	Monroe Central	1992, 2006, 2009, 2010, 2011, 2012, 2018, 2020
5	Blue River Valley	1972, 1979, 1991, 1993, 2016
5	Union (M)	1968, 1969, 1970, 1986, 1999
3	Randolph Southern	1994, 2007, 2008
1	Cowan	1980
1	Wes-Del	2013
0	Eastern Hancock	
0	Shenandoah	

- Muncie Burris is no longer in the Mid-Eastern Conference.

=== Girls cross country ===
#	Team	Seasons
8	Monroe Central	2010, 2011, 2012, 2020, 2021, 2022, 2023, 2024
6	Cowan	2000, 2001, 2002, 2003, 2009, 2019
6	Wapahani	2004, 2005, 2006, 2007, 2018, 2025
5	Randolph Southern	2008, 2014, 2015, 2016, 2017
1	Muncie Burris	2013
0	Blue River Valley	
0	Daleville	
0	Eastern Hancock	
0	Shenandoah	
0	Union (M)	
0	Wes-Del	

- Muncie Burris is no longer in the Mid-Eastern Conference.

=== Football ===
#	Team	Seasons
3	Eastern Hancock	2019, 2023, 2024
2	Monroe Central	2020, 2021
1	Shenandoah	2018
1	North Decatur	2022
0	Wes-Del	

- North Decatur was a football-only member of the MEC from 2021 to 2024
- The MEC stopped sponsoring football after the 2024 season.

=== Boys Golf ===
#	Team	Seasons
8	Monroe Central	1982, 1986, 1987, 1988, 1989, 2018, 2019, 2021
4	Wapahani	1993, 1994, 1995, 1998
3	Shenandoah	2022, 2023, 2024
1	Blue River Valley	1971
1	Daleville	1985
1	Muncie Burris	1996
1	Union (M)	2013
0	Eastern Hancock	
0	Randolph Southern	
0	Cowan	
0	Wes-Del	

- Muncie Burris is no longer in the Mid-Eastern Conference.

=== Girls Golf ===
#	Team	Seasons
6	Daleville	2013, 2016, 2020, 2021, 2022, 2023
4	Wapahani	2012, 2017, 2018, 2024
1	Wes-Del	2019
0	Blue River Valley	
0	Cowan	
0	Eastern Hancock	
0	Monroe Central	
0	Randolph Southern	
0	Shenandoah	
0	Union (M)	
0	Muncie Burris	

=== Softball ===
#	Team	Seasons
5	Eastern Hancock	2019, 2021, 2022, 2023, 2024
1	Shenandoah	2025
0	Cowan	
0	Daleville	
0	Monroe Central	
0	Randolph Southern	
0	Blue River Valley	
0	Union (M)	
0	Wapahani	
0	Wes-Del	
0	Muncie Burris	

=== Boys Track & Field ===
#	Team	Seasons
14	Wapahani	1971, 1972, 1976, 1996, 1997, 1999, 2012, 2017, 2018, 2021, 2022, 2023, 2024, 2025
9	Muncie Burris	1978, 1994*, 1998, 2001, 2003, 2004, 2006, 2007, 2010
7	Daleville	1965, 1967, 1968, 1974, 1975, 1977, 2014
7	Monroe Central	1993, 1994*, 1995, 2002, 2013, 2015, 2016
5	Frankton	1983, 1984, 1985, 1988, 1989
4	Union (M)	1966, 1969, 1970, 2000, 2011
3	Cowan	1981, 1982, 2009
3	Randolph Southern	1990, 1991, 1992,
2	Wes-Del	1986, 1987
1	Blue River Valley	1979
1	Northeastern	1973
1	Eastern Hancock	2019
0	Shenandoah	

- Frankton, Muncie Burris, and Northeastern are no longer in the Mid-Eastern Conference.
- 1994; Monroe Central and Muncie Burris were Co-Champions.
- The 2020 season was cancelled due to Covid.

=== Girls Track & Field ===
#	Team	Seasons
4	Wapahani	2019, 2021, 2022, 2023
4	Muncie Burris	2008, 2009, 2010, 2014
3	Randolph Southern	2015, 2016*, 2017
3	Wes-Del	2011, 2012, 2013
2	Eastern Hancock	2018, 2024
2	Monroe Central	1998, 2016*
1	Shenandoah	2025
0	Cowan	
0	Daleville	
0	Blue River Valley	
0	Union (M)	

The 2020 season was cancelled due to Covid.

=== Volleyball ===
#	Team	Seasons
12	Wapahani	2013, 2014, 2015, 2016, 2017, 2018, 2019, 2021, 2022, 2023, 2024, 2025
1	Cowan	2020
0	Daleville	
0	Eastern Hancock	
0	Monroe Central	
0	Randolph Southern	
0	Shenandoah	
0	Union (M)	
0	Blue River Valley	
0	Wes-Del	
0	Cadiz	
0	Frankton	
0	Mooreland	
0	Mt. Summit	
0	Muncie Burris	
0	Northeastern	

=== Wrestling ===
#	Team	Seasons
15	Monroe Central	1974, 1975, 1977, 1986, 1993, 1996, 1997, 2006, 2007, 2008, 2009, 2012, 2015, 2016, 2017
10	Wapahani	1973, 1979, 1980, 1981, 1982, 1990, 1991, 1998, 1999, 2000
9	Wes-Del	1983, 1984, 1985, 1987, 1988, 1989, 2011, 2013, 2014
6	Randolph Southern	1995, 2001, 2002, 2003, 2004, 2005
6	Cowan	2019, 2020, 2021, 2022, 2023, 2024
5	Daleville	1970, 1971, 1972, 1976, 1978
2	Eastern Hancock	2025, 2026
0	Blue River Valley	
0	Shenandoah	
0	Union (M)	

=== Cheerleading ===
#	Team	Seasons
5	Daleville	2016, 2018, 2019, 2024, 2025
3	Eastern Hancock	2020, 2022, 2023
1	Wapahani	2017
0	Cowan	
0	Monroe Central	
0	Randolph Southern	
0	Shenandoah	
0	Union (M)	
0	Blue River Valley	
0	Wes-Del	

There was no competition in 2021 due to Covid.

== State champions ==
IHSAA State Champions

=== Cowan Blackhawks (2) ===
- 2012 Volleyball (A)
- 2019 Volleyball (A)

=== Burris Owls (23) ===
- 1943 Boys' Track & Field
- 1982 Volleyball
- 1985 Volleyball
- 1986 Volleyball
- 1989 Volleyball
- 1990 Volleyball
- 1992 Volleyball
- 1993 Volleyball
- 1994 Volleyball
- 1997 Volleyball (2A)
- 1998 Volleyball (2A)
- 1999 Volleyball (2A)
- 2000 Volleyball (2A)
- 2001 Volleyball (2A)
- 2002 Volleyball (2A)
- 2003 Volleyball (2A)
- 2004 Volleyball (2A)
- 2005 Volleyball (2A)
- 2006 Volleyball (2A)
- 2007 Volleyball (2A)
- 2008 Volleyball (2A)
- 2009 Volleyball (2A)
- 2010 Volleyball (2A)

=== Daleville Broncos (2) ===
- 2016 Baseball (A)
- 2018 Baseball (A)

=== Wapahani Raiders (7) ===
- 2002 Volleyball (A)
- 2011 Volleyball (2A)
- 2012 Volleyball (2A)
- 2014 Baseball (2A)
- 2015 Volleyball (2A)
- 2016 Volleyball (2A)
- 2022 Volleyball (2A)

=== Wes-Del Warriors (2) ===
- 2011 Volleyball (A)
- 2014 Volleyball (A)

== Resources ==
- IHSAA Conferences
- IHSAA Directory
