= Eastern Indiana Athletic Conference =

High school athletics conference

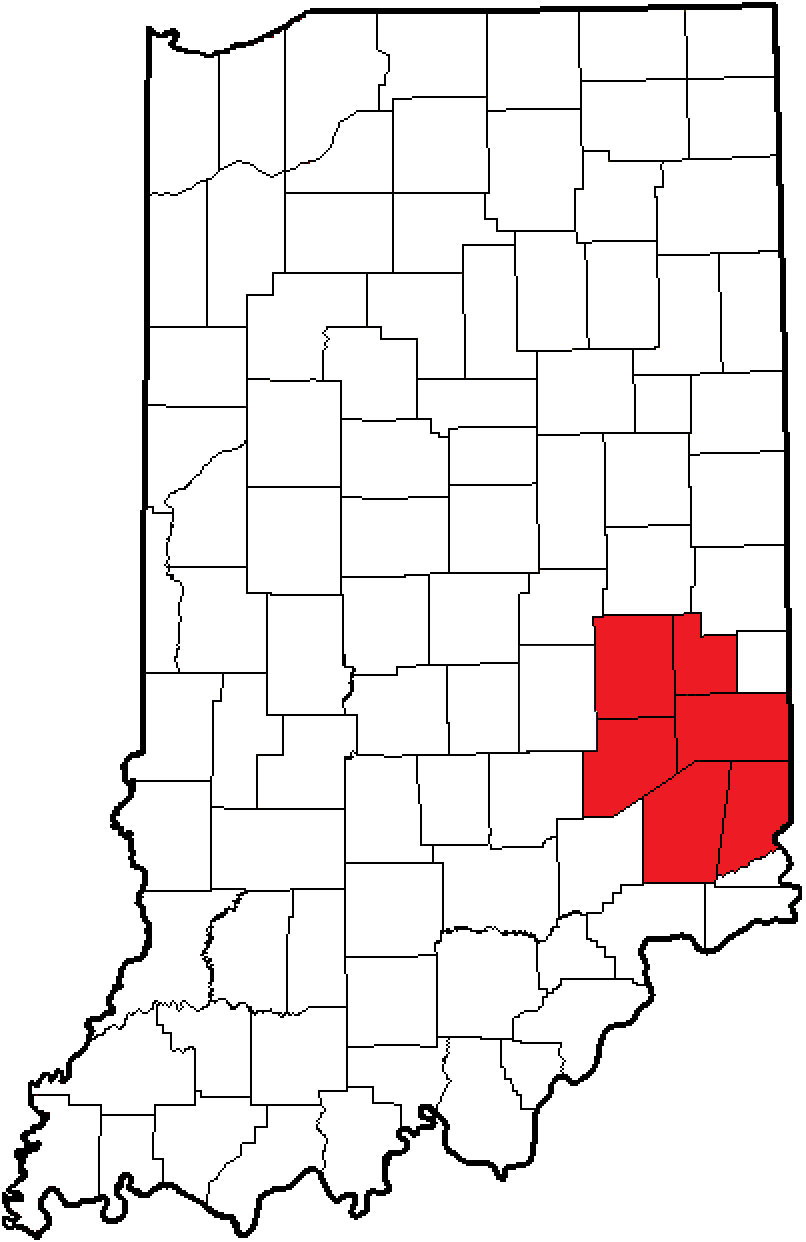
Map of Indiana counties with member high schools

The Eastern Indiana Athletic Conference (EIAC) is an American eight-member IHSAA-sanctioned high school athletic conference. Current members consist of Batesville, Connersville, East Central, Franklin County, Greensburg, Lawrenceburg, Rushville, and South Dearborn. All eight member schools are located in rural southeast Indiana, spread across Dearborn, Decatur, Fayette, Franklin, Ripley, and Rush counties. The EIAC was founded in 1956 when Brookville, Cambridge City, and Hagerstown of the East Central Conference joined with Aurora, Batesville, and Lawrenceburg of the Southeastern Indiana Conference. Batesville and Lawrenceburg are the only two of the original six founding schools that haven't consolidated or left the conference. North Dearborn joined the conference in 1962, which eventually consolidated into East Central in 1973. In 1974, Greensburg parted ways with the South Central Conference to join the EIAC. Aurora consolidated into South Dearborn in 1978 and Brookville consolidated into Franklin County in 1989. With the exception of 1962–66, 1973–74, 1977–85 (7 members), and 1974–77 (8 members), the conference had been a six-member league until 2013 when Connersville and Rushville joined.

This conference should not be confused with the Eastern Indiana Conference, a small-school conference in Northeast Indiana that existed from 1953 to 1975.

== Membership ==
School	City	Team name	Colors	Enrollment 24–25	IHSAA Class	IHSAA Class Football	County	Year joined	Previous conference
Batesville	Batesville	Bulldogs		670	3A	3A	69; Ripley	1956	Southeastern Indiana
Connersville	Connersville	Spartans		930	3A	4A	21; Fayette	2013	Independents (Olympic 2010)
East Central	St. Leon	Trojans		1241	4A	5A	15; Dearborn	1973	none (new school)
Franklin County	Brookville	Wildcats		650	3A	3A	24; Franklin	1989	none (new school)
Greensburg	Greensburg	Pirates		662	3A	3A	16; Decatur	1974	South Central
Lawrenceburg	Lawrenceburg	Tigers		726	3A	3A	15; Dearborn	1956	Southeastern Indiana
Rushville	Rushville	Lions		645	3A	3A	70; Rush	2013	Hoosier Heritage
South Dearborn	Aurora	Knights		645	3A	3A	15; Dearborn	1978	none (new school)

=== Football divisions ===
In football, two divisions were implemented starting in 2013.

Large	Small
Connersville	Batesville
East Central	Greensburg
Franklin County	South Dearborn
Lawrenceburg	Rushville

=== Former members ===
School	City	Team name	Colors	County	Year joined	Previous conference	Year left	Conference joined
Aurora	Aurora	Red Devils		15; Dearborn	1956	Southeastern Indiana	1978	none (consolidated into South Dearborn)
Brookville	Brookville	Greyhounds		24; Franklin	1956; 1973	East Central; Tri-Eastern	1966; 1989	Tri-Eastern none (consolidated into Franklin County)
Cambridge City	Cambridge; City	Golden Eagles		89; Wayne	1956	East Central	1962	Tri-Eastern
Hagerstown	Hagerstown	Tigers		89; Wayne	1956	East Central	1962	Mississinewa Valley
Milan	Milan	Indians		69; Ripley	1962	Ohio River Valley	1985	Ohio River Valley
North Dearborn	Guilford	Vikings		15; Dearborn	1962	Independents (new school 1958)	1973	none (consolidated into East Central)
Jennings County^{1}	North Vernon	Panthers	^{2}	40; Jennings	1962	Independents (SE IN 1958)	1973	Hoosier Hills Conference
South; Decatur	Greensburg	Cougars		16; Decatur	1973	Mid-Hoosier	1977	Mid-Hoosier

1. Was North Vernon before 1968, played concurrently in EIAC and HHC 1972–73.
2. Colors were light blue and white until 1968.

== Conference championships ==
=== Football ===
#	Team	Seasons
32	East Central	1973*, 1982*, 1987*, 1989, 1991, 1993, 1994, 1998*, 2000, 2001, 2002*, 2003, 2004, 2005, 2006, 2007, 2008, 2010, 2011, 2012, 2013 (4A), 2014 (4A), 2015 (4A), 2016 (4A), 2017 (4A), 2018 (4A), 2019 (4A), 2020 (4A), 2021 (4A), 2022 (4A), 2023 (4A), 2024 (4A)
27	Lawrenceburg	1957, 1962*, 1963, 1967*, 1970, 1971, 1972, 1974, 1975, 1976, 1978, 1979, 1980, 1981, 1984, 1985, 1986, 1987*, 1988, 1992, 1998*, 2014 (3A), 2016 (3A), 2017 (3A), 2019 (3A), 2020 (3A), 2021 (3A), 2025 (3A)
10	Batesville	1956, 1965, 1973*, 1983*, 2002*, 2009, 2013 (3A), 2015 (3A), 2018 (3A), 2023 (3A)
6	Franklin County	1990, 1995, 1997, 1998*, 1999, 2002*
6	Aurora	1960*, 1962*, 1964, 1966, 1967*
4	Brookville	1958, 1959, 1960*, 1977
4	South Dearborn	1982*, 1983*, 1996, 2022 (3A)
1	Hagerstown	1961
1	Jennings County	1969
1	Milan	1968
1	Rushville	2024 (3A)
0	Cambridge City	
0	Connersville	
0	Greensburg	
0	North Dearborn	
0	North Vernon	
0	South Decatur	

=== Boys basketball ===
#	Team	Seasons
14	Batesville	1963, 1971, 1975*, 1977, 1978, 1979*, 1994, 1995, 1996, 1997, 2003*, 2006, 2007*, 2008
12	Greensburg	1975*, 1980, 1989, 1990, 1993, 2003*, 2005*, 2010, 2012, 2013, 2014, 2019
9	East Central	1998, 1999, 2000*, 2001, 2002, 2004, 2005*, 2007*, 2011
6	Lawrenceburg	1960, 1961, 1969*, 1974, 1976, 1981, 1982, 1992*, 2000*, 2009
4	Connersville	2015, 2016, 2017, 2018
4	South Dearborn	1979*, 1985*, 1991, 1992*
2	Aurora	1957, 1975*
2	Brookville	1958, 1962
2	Jennings County	1972, 1973
2	North Dearborn	1968*, 1969*
2	North Vernon	1967, 1968*
1	Cambridge City	1959
0	Franklin County	
0	Hagerstown	
0	Milan	
0	Rushville	
0	South Decatur	

- Champions 1963–66, 1969–70, 1973–74, 1975–76, and 1980–88 (except SD 1984–85) unverified.

=== Girls basketball ===
#	Team	Seasons
13	Franklin County	1999, 2000, 2001, 2002, 2003, 2004, 2005, 2006, 2007, 2008, 2010, 2011, 2012*
8	East Central	1992, 1996, 1997, 1998, 2012*, 2013, 2015, 2019
4	Greensburg	2009*, 2016, 2018, 2020
2	Rushville	2014, 2017
1	Batesville	2009*
0	Connersville	
0	Lawrenceburg	1980, 1981, 1982
0	South Dearborn	

- Champions between beginning of competition in sport until 1991, and 1992-95 are unverified.

== State champions ==
=== Batesville Bulldogs (6) ===
- 1992 Mike Daily, Wrestling (Wt. 119)
- 2007 Ellie Tidman, Track & Field (High Jump)
- 2008 Ellie Tidman, Track & Field (High Jump)
- 2009 Ellie Tidman, Track & Field (High Jump)
- 2010 Ellie Tidman, Track & Field (High Jump)
- 2011 Chris Giesting, Track & Field (400 Meter Dash)

=== Connersville Spartans (2) ===
- 1972 Boys Basketball
- 1983 Boys Basketball

=== East Central Trojans (5) ===
- 1994 Football (4A)
- 2017 Football (4A)
- 2022 Football (4A)
- 2023 Football (4A)
- 2020 Wrestling Runner Up - Bryer Hall (152 pounds)
- 2021 Wrestling Champion - Bryer Hall (170 pounds)
- 2021 IHSWCA 3A Team State Wrestling Champions

=== Greensburg Pirates (2) ===
- 2013 Boys Basketball (3A)
- 2014 Boys Basketball (3A)
- 2018 Girls Basketball Runner up (3A)

=== Lawrenceburg Tigers (8) ===
- 1963 Denver Kennett, Track & Field (High Jump)
- 1975 Football (A)
- 1978 Football (A)
- 1986 Chris Green, Track & Field (400 Meter Dash)
- 2016-2017-2018 - Mason Parris, Wrestling (220 Pounds)
- 2024 Girls' soccer
- 2024 Seth Graham, JV Wrestling (285 pounds)

== Resources ==
- IHSAA Conferences
- IHSAA Directory
- IHSAA State Champions
- IHSAA Classification
- IHSAA Football Classification
