= Mid-Hoosier Conference =

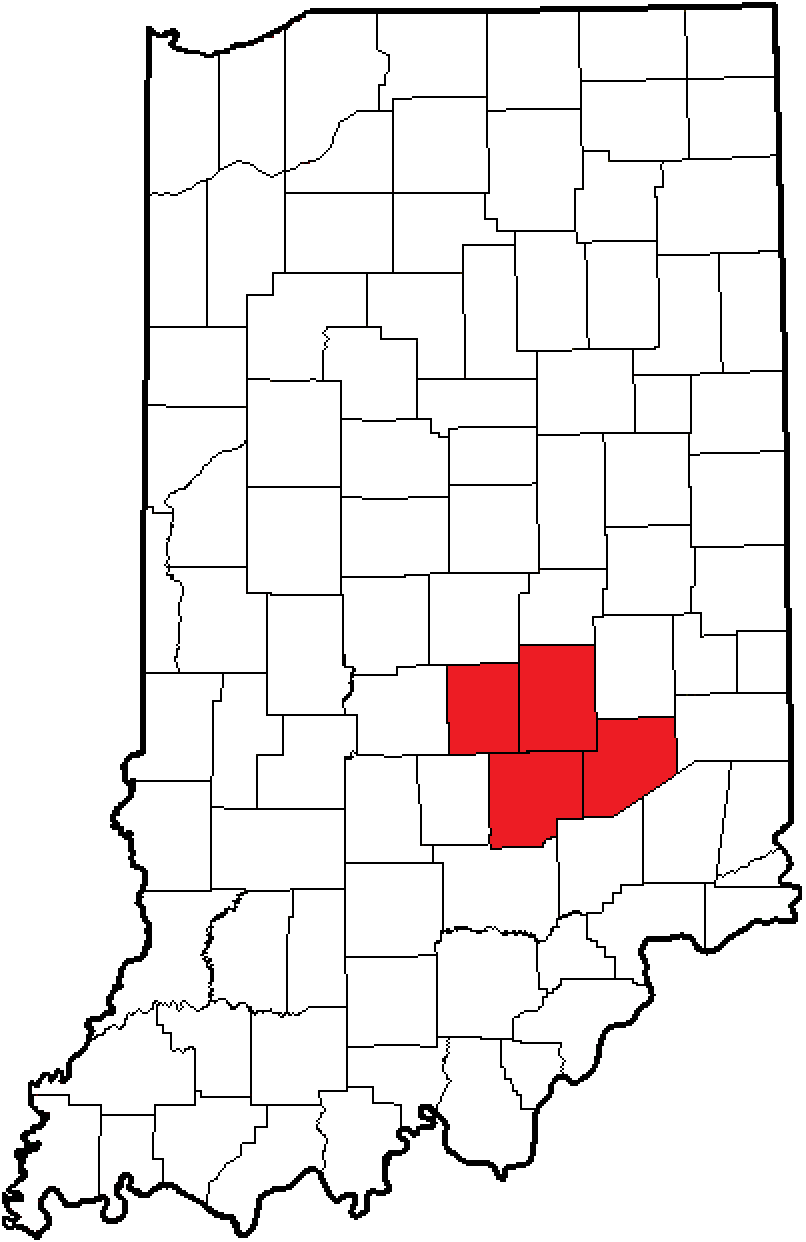
The Mid-Hoosier Conference within Indiana

The Mid-Hoosier Conference is a seven-member IHSAA-sanctioned athletic association located within Bartholomew, Decatur, Johnson, and Shelby Counties in Central Indiana.

== History ==
The conference was formed in 1964 by seven schools from Bartholomew (Hauser), Brown (Brown County), and Shelby (Southwestern, Triton Central, Waldron) counties as a conference for smaller schools south of Indianapolis. Johnson County schools Edinburgh and Whiteland would join in 1965. The conference had some roster changes in its early years, as Whiteland outgrew the MHC and moved to the Mid-State, while Indian Creek and South Decatur joined as newly consolidated schools. Triton Central left in 1969, and was replaced by Crothersville. South Decatur would join the Eastern Indiana Athletic Conference in 1973, but would return in 1977. The league would once again go through changes in the 1980s, as North Decatur (1980) and Morristown (1985) would join, and Crothersville would leave to become a full-time member of the Southern Athletic Conference, having been a member of both the MHC and the SAC since the latter's inception in 1974.

The league would stay stable until the late 1990s, as Triton Central rejoined from the Rangeline Conference, bringing membership to 10. This would be short-lived, however, as Brown County would join the reformed Western Indiana Conference in 1999. Triton Central would join the Indiana Crossroads Conference in 2012. The MHC would respond by bringing in two former White River Conference schools, Eastern Hancock and Knightstown. Both schools were scheduled to join in 2013, but Eastern Hancock was able to arrange its scheduling to join in 2012.

Indian Creek will however be leaving and joining the Western Indiana Conference (WIC). Indian Creek will also begin playing in the WIC Football Conference as well as a result of S. Vermillion leaving the WIC and returning to the WRC (Wabash River Conference). Eastern Hancock and Knightstown also decided to end their affiliation with the conference that year, with both scheduled to begin the process of joining new conferences in the fall of 2017.

All of the football-playing schools of the MHC participate in the Mid-Indiana Football Conference.

== Membership ==
School	Location	Mascot	Colors	Enrollment 24–25	IHSAA Class	IHSAA Class Football	County	Year joined	Previous conference
Edinburgh^{1}	Edinburgh	Lancers		227	1A	1A	41; Johnson	1965	Johnson County
Hauser	Hope	Jets		272	1A	-	03; Bartholomew	1964	Dixie
Morristown	Morristown	Yellow Jackets		169	1A	-	73; Shelby	1985	Big Blue River
North; Decatur	Greensburg	Chargers		314	1A	1A	16; Decatur	1980	Big Blue River
South; Decatur^{2}	Greensburg	Cougars		265	1A	1A	16; Decatur	1968; 1977	none (new school); Eastern Indiana
Southwestern (Shelbyville)	Shelbyville	Spartans		183	1A	-	73; Shelby	1964	Shelby County
Waldron	Waldron	Mohawks		175	1A	-	73; Shelby	1964	Shelby County

1. Edinburgh played concurrently in the MHC and JCC 1965–67.
2. South Decatur played in the EIAC 1973–77.

=== Former members ===
School	Location	Mascot	Colors	County	Year joined	Previous conference	Year left	Conference joined
Brown; County	Nashville	Eagles		7 Brown	1964		1999	Western Indiana
Triton; Central	Fairland	Tigers		73; Shelby	1964; 1996	Shelby County; Rangeline	1968; 2012	Big Blue River; Indiana Crossroads
Whiteland	Whiteland	Warriors		41; Johnson	1965	Johnson County	1968	Mid-State
Indian; Creek	Trafalgar	Braves		41; Johnson	1967	none (new school)	2016	Western Indiana
Crothersville^{1}	Crothersville	Tigers		36; Jackson	1969	Dixie-Monon	1983	Southern
Eastern; Hancock	Charlottesville	Royals		30; Hancock	2012	Independents (WRC 2010)	2016	Independents (MEC 2017)
Knightstown	Knightstown	Panthers		33; Henry	2013	Independents (MEC 2010)	2016	Independents (TEC 2017)

1. Crothersville played in both the MHC and SAC from the SAC's inception in 1974 until leaving the MHC in 1983.

== State champions ==
IHSAA State Champions

=== Hauser Jets (2) ===
- 2006 Boys Basketball (A)
- 2015 Softball (A)

=== Morristown Yellow Jackets (2) ===
- 2003 Volleyball (A)
- 2018 boys basketball (A)

=== South Decatur Cougars (1) ===
- 1990 Football (A)

=== Triton Central Tigers (1) ===
- 2003 Baseball (2A)

=== Waldron Mohawks (1) ===
- 2004 Boys Basketball (A)

== Resources ==
- IHSAA Conferences
- IHSAA Directory
