= Eastern Hancock High School =

School in Charlottesville, Indiana, United States

Location
- 10320 East 250 North; Charlottesville, Hancock County, Indiana 46117; United States; 39.824029°N 85.611103°W

Information
- Type: Public Secondary
- Established: 1964–65
- School district: Community School Corporation of Eastern Hancock County
- Superintendent: Dr. George Philhower
- Principal: Adam Barton
- Teaching staff: 23.83 (FTE)
- Grades: 9–12
- Enrollment: 378 (2023–2024)
- Student to teacher ratio: 15.86
- Campus: Rural
- Color
- Athletics conference: Mid-Eastern Conference
- Team name: Royals
- Website: www.easternhancock.org/page/high-school

Eastern Hancock High School is a public high school located just north of Charlottesville, Indiana, United States. It is managed by the Community School Corporation of Eastern Hancock County. Schools in neighboring Wilkinson, Shirley, and Charlottesville consolidated in 1970 forming the Eastern Hancock district that includes all the eastern third of Hancock County.

== History ==
Although Eastern Hancock's school district covers more area than any other school district in the county, it has the smallest number of enrolled students due to eastern Hancock County being mainly rural. The Community School Corporation of Eastern Hancock County represents the consolidation of the school's three townships: Brown, Blue River and Jackson. The towns of Wilkinson, Shirley, Charlottesville, Warrington, Willow Branch and parts of Greenfield are all in the Eastern Hancock School District.

The school began in 1964–65, but the new Eastern Hancock Junior-Senior High School facilities were completed in 1971. The Elementary building was completed in 1979 and the Middle School was completed in 1996.

Consolidation History to become the Community School Corporation of Eastern Hancock County:

- Eastern Hancock – Royals
  - Charlottesville – Eagles
    - Westland – Bears
    - Blue River Township Schools
    - Jackson Township Schools
    - Stinger School
  - Wilkinson – Bulldogs
    - Shirley School
    - Warrington School

== Athletics ==
The Eastern Hancock High School Royals are a member of the Mid-Eastern Conference. IHSAA sanctioned sports offered at EHHS include: tennis, cross country, football, volleyball, basketball, swimming, wrestling, baseball, softball, golf, and track and field. The school's only state championship in any sport came in the fall of 1985, when the football team defeated Jimtown High School in the Class A title game 20–7.

You can find a detailed history of each Eastern Hancock Sports History by CLICKING HERE

=== Conference champions ===
Total	Sport	BBRC (1968–1989)	WRAC (1993–2010)	MHC/MIFC (2012–2016)	MEC (2017–present)	ECC (Future)
1	Baseball	1968–69 (1)				–
3	Basketball (Boys)		2001–02; 2002–03 (2)		2017–18 (1)	–
6	Basketball (Girls)	1984–85; 1985–86 (2)	1998–99 (1)		2022–23; 2023–24; 2024–25 (3)	–
2	Cross country (Boys)		2004–05; 2006–07 (2)			–
12	Cross country (Girls)		1996–97; 1997–98; 1998–99; 1999–00; 2000–01; 2005–06; 2006–07; 2007–08 (8)	2012–13; 2013–14; 2014–15; 2015–16 (4)		–
12	Football	1971–72; 1976–77; 1977–78; 1980–81 (4)	1995–96; 1998–99; 2000–01 (3)	2013–14; 2015–16 (2)	2019–20; 2023–24; 2024–25 (3)	–
3	Golf (Boys)	1972–73; 1975–76; 1980–81 (3)				–
1	Golf (Girls)		2001–02 (1)			–
7	Softball			2012–13; 2014–15 (2)	2018–19; 2020–21; 2021–22; 2022–23; 2023–24 (5)	–
14	Tennis (Boys)		1996–97; 1997–98; 1999–00; 2000–01; 2001–02; 2002–03; 2004–05; 2008–09 (8)		2019–20; 2021–22; 2022–23; 2023–24; 2024–25; 2025–26 (6)	–
13	Tennis (Girls)	1985–86 (1)	1996–97; 1997–98; 1998–99; 2000–01; 2000–01; 2001–02; 2002–03; 2003–04; 2004–05 (9)		2021–22; 2022–23; 2023–24 (3)	–
9	Track and field (Boys)	1976–77; 1977–78; 1978–79 (3)	2003–04; 2004–05 (2)	2012–13; 2013–14; 2015–16 (3)	2018–19 (1)	–
17	Track and field (Girls)		1994–95; 1995–96; 1997–98; 1998–99; 1999–00; 2000–01; 2002–03; 2006–07; 2007–08; 2008–09; 2009–10 (11)	2012–13; 2013–14; 2014–15; 2015–16 (4)	2017–18; 2023–24 (2)	–
1	Volleyball			2012–13 (1)		–
4	Wrestling	1981–82; 1985–86 (2)	2004–05 (1)		2024–25 (1)	–
TOTAL		16	48	16	25	0

NOTE: School was in the East Central Conference from 1964–1968, but did not win any championships.

=== Sectional, regional, semi-state, state champions ===
Total #	Sport	Sectional Champions	Regional Champions	Semi-State Champions	State Champions
1	Baseball	1975–76	—	—	—
8	Basketball (Boys)	1967–68; 1973–74; 1980–81; 2002–03; 2007–08; 2021–22	2002–03; 2021–22	—	—
6	Basketball (Girls)	2000–01; 2016–17; 2022–23; 2023–24	2022–23; 2023–24	—	—
16	Football	1983–84; 1984–85; 1985–86; 1987–88; 1988–89; 2002–03; 2003–04; 2006–07; 2013–14; 2014–15; 2023–24	1985–86; 2013–14	1985–86; 2013–14	1985–86
12	Softball	2009–10; 2012–13; 2015–16; 2016–17; 2018–19; 2020–21; 2021–22; 2023–24	2012–13; 2015–16; 2021–22; 2023–24	—	—
1	Tennis (Boys)	1997–98	—	—	—
4	Tennis (Girls)	1994–95; 1997–98; 1998–99; 2000–01	—	—	—
3	Volleyball	1984–85; 2012–13	2012–13	—	—
8	Wrestling	1976–77; 1979–80; 1980–81; 1981–82; 1982–83; 1984–85; 2000–01; 2001–02	—	—	—
59	TOTAL	45	11	2	1

=== EH Athletic Hall of Famers ===
The following individuals and teams have been inducted into the Eastern Hancock Athletic Hall of Fame.

Induction Class	Teams	Individuals
2008	1985 State Championship Football Team	Bob Copeland; Carey Bradley Willis; Cheryl Vail Apple; Doug Peacock; Jenni Beaver McDaniel; Kent Colclazier; Larry Spegal; Pete Hubert; Richard O'Neal
2009		Alexis Laska; Andrea Engleking; Carolyn Johnson; Lisa Rodebeck Eastes
2010		Keith Oliver; Rusty Low
2011		Brian Maynard; Shana Wyatt Field
2012		Derek Harmon
2013	1968 Sectional Championship Boys Basketball Team	Bob Oakes; Joe Levering; Paul (Butch) Holliday
2014	2003 Final Four Boys Basketball Team	David Smith
2015		Gary Sullivan
2016		Caleb Kennedy
2017		David Dunbar; Jeremy Wisehart; Joe Havlin; Lexi Vincz
2019		Daniela Debnarova Drobna; Abbey Freeman Bolden; Breanna Lawyer; Matt Simmons; Dustin Smith; Brenda Wolski
2020		Steven Stunda; Robert "Bob" Wampler
2021		Jon Cain; Chet Ellis; Allan (Butch) Holden; Clayton Shultz
2022		Fran Stephenson
2023	2012 Girls Cross Country Team	Kiersten Schrope Martin; Shelby Mourey Reed
2024	2012 Volleyball Team; 2013 Football Team; 2013 Softball Team	Darby Shaw Smith; Kaycee Ruble Bell; Cooper Henderson
2025		Clayton Brumfield

== Arts ==
=== Music ===
==== Band ====
Eastern Hancock has one band. It is a Marching Band that marches during halftime at football games and during several parades with their colorguard. They also perform several concerts at the school throughout the year. The band is currently directed by Mr. Daniel Buckalew. They participate annual in the Indiana State Fair Band Day as well as the Central Indiana District Solo and Ensemble.

In 2014, for the first time since 1986, they participated in the Indiana State Fair Band Day contest. They have participated annually since then. Their performances are as follows:

Band Day History
Year	Director	Show Title	Piece(s) Performed	Prelim. Score	Placement
1970	Dan Burgner	–			56
1986	Kurt Scott	–		44.85	36
2014	Dan Buckalew	Jazz Rock	The Jazz Police Chameleon	36.10	37
2015	Dan Buckalew	The Music of Harry Potter		37.875	35
2016	Dan Buckalew	Star Wars: The Force Awakens	Star Wars (Main Theme) / Rey's Theme The Jedi Steps and Finale	49.152	34

==== Choir ====
Eastern Hancock has two choirs: One Show Choir and one Concert Choir, primarily known as the "High School Choir". Both choirs sing annually at nursing homes, as well as the school's scheduled concerts.

===== Show Choir =====
At Eastern Hancock, the Show Choir, also known as the "Royal Singers" or the "Advanced Chorus," is the advanced choir. They sing many times throughout the year including, but not limited to, nursing homes once a year, the school's home volleyball and basketball games, the Indianapolis Zoo around Christmas, and the Riley Festival, a festival held annually in Greenfield, Indiana. An audition with a solo is required to be in the Show Choir.

===== High School Choir =====
The High School Choir, also known as the "Intermediate Chorus," is the no-audition choir at Eastern Hancock. 8th Graders at Eastern Hancock Middle School, however, may audition to join the High School Choir one year early and earn High School credits that count toward their diploma. They sing at nursing homes and several other organized performances throughout the year.

=== Theatre ===
Eastern Hancock has a Drama Club, where they put on two productions, one play and one musical, every year. The drama club has been around for many years. The following table states some of the many productions put on at Eastern Hancock.

Drama Productions
Year	Director(s)	Type of Show	Show Title
2009	Mike Hewitt	Musical	Cinderella
2013	Mike Hewitt	Play	Get Witch Quick!
2014	Mike Hewitt	Musical	Meet Me In St. Louis
2014	Kathy Davis	Play	Curse of the Cobra's Kiss
2015	Kathy Davis	Musical	Cinderella
2015	Kathy Davis	Play	The Princess Who Had No Name
2016	Kathy Davis	Musical	Footloose
2016	Mike Hewitt	Play	Murder Can Be Habit Forming
2017	Mike Hewitt	Musical	The Sound of Music
2017	Mike Hewitt	Play	Backstage!

=== Art ===
Eastern Hancock has several art classes:

- Drawing I
- Photography
- Digital Design
- Advanced 2D/3D Art
- AP Art

Eastern Hancock also has an Art Club, hosted by the Art Teacher, that does various events throughout the year around the county.

== Academics ==
Eastern Hancock offers Science, Social Studies, Mathematics, English, and Fine Arts academic teams. They all compete annually at the Academic Super Bowl. They also won the 2003 and 2011 State Science Academic Championships. The Eastern Hancock Fine Arts Team finished 6th in the State in 2012.

In addition, Eastern Hancock has a Spell Bowl team. Spell Bowl members spend the semester figuring out how to spell complex words and compete every year at the annual Indiana Spell Bowl Competition.

== School information ==
=== Facilities ===
There are many facilities around the school, including:

- Auditorium
- Main Office and Athletic Office
- Conference Room
- Computer Lab and Robotics Lab
- Cafeteria with Indoor and Outdoor Seating
- Library

Eastern Hancock also has many athletic facilities, including:

- 2 American Football fields (One being a practice field)
- 3 baseball/softball fields
- Track field
- Gymnasium with Concessions Stand
- 8 tennis courts
- 2 batting cages
- Weight Room
- Swimming Pool
- Varsity, Junior Varsity, and Standard Locker Rooms

=== Computing ===
Eastern Hancock uses a form of computer distribution known as 1:1 Computing. One to One computing is where all students and teachers are given a computer, or any other device that is similar. Laptops and desktops are the current standard, however, the students of Eastern Hancock High School and Eastern Hancock Middle School are given Chromebooks. The teachers in all three schools (High School, Middle School, and Elementary School) get laptops.

=== FFA ===
FFA is one of the largest extra-curricular activities at Eastern Hancock. The Eastern Hancock FFA has won and/or placed in the top 5 at many area, state, and national judging contests in both the senior and junior divisions.

== See also ==
- List of high schools in Indiana
- Mid-Eastern Conference
