= Blue River Valley Junior-Senior High School =

Blue River Valley Junior/Senior High School

Location
- 4741 North Viking Trail; Mount Summit, Henry County, IN 47361; United States
- Coordinates: 40°00′06″N 85°19′43″W

Information
- Type: Public
- Motto: Cognita Est Libertas (Freedom is Known)
- School district: Blue River Valley School Corporation
- Principal: Emily Whaley
- Teaching staff: 24.50 (FTE basis)
- Grades: 7-12
- Enrollment: 297 (2023-2024)
- Student to teacher ratio: 12.12
- Color
- Athletics conference: IHSAA District 2 Mid-Eastern Conference
- Nickname: Vikings
- Website: http://www.brv.k12.in.us/jr-sr-high/jr-sr-high-school

Blue River Valley Junior/Senior High School is a public high school located northeast of New Castle, Indiana.

== About ==
The school serves about 300 students in grades 7 through 12. It is one of 5 high schools in Henry County, Indiana. The principal is Emily Whaley.

Blue River Valley Schools are located on one campus near the source of Big Blue River and are sited overlooking Big Blue River and the Blue River Valley. The school corporation serves Blue River and Prairie Townships in northern Henry County.

== Athletics ==
Blue River participates in class 1A Indiana High School Athletic Association athletics in the Mid-Eastern Conference.

Boys' - Golf, Baseball, Basketball, Wrestling, Track, Cross Country, and Tennis.

Girls' - Golf, Basketball, Wrestling, Track, Cross Country, Tennis, and Volleyball.

== See also ==
- List of high schools in Indiana
