= South Henry School Corporation =

School district in Indiana

Coordinates: 39°49′56.8″N 85°21′02.2″W

Address
- 6972 South State Road 103, Straughn, 47387 Straughn, Indiana United States of America

District information
- Type: Public
- Grades: K–12
- Established: 1963
- Superintendent: Wesley Hammond

Students and staff
- Students: 847 (Preliminary, 2007–08)
- Teachers: 48 full time equivalent (2006–07)
- Athletic conference: Tri Eastern Conference
- District mascot: Titans
- Colors: Burgundy and white

Other information
- Website: www.shenry.k12.in.us

The South Henry School Corporation is a public school corporation located in southern Henry County, Indiana. The district was formed in 1963 through the consolidation of schools in Dudley, Franklin, and Spiceland townships. Tri Junior-Senior High School, dedicated in November 1970, absorbed former high schools in Lewisville, New Lisbon, Spiceland and Straughn.

== Schools ==
=== Secondary ===
- Tri Junior-Senior High School (7–12)

=== Elementary ===
- Tri Elementary School (K–6)
- Spiceland Elementary (K–4) (Closed)
