= Tri-Eastern Conference All-Sports Titles =

Tri-Eastern Conference all-sports titles won.

== Boys' ==
Titles	School	Years
21	Centerville	1965, 1977, 1979, 1980, 1981, 1982, 1985, 1994, 1995, 1996, 2001, 2004, 2005, 2006, 2008, 2009, 2010, 2011, 2012, 2020, 2021
17	Winchester	1975, 1976, 1978, 1984, 1987, 1988, 1989, 1990, 1991, 1992, 1993, 1997, 1999, 2000, 2002, 2003, 2007
8	Hagerstown	1986, 1998, 2013, 2016, 2017, 2018, 2019, 2022
8	Union City	1963, 1966, 1968, 1969, 1970, 1972, 1973, 1974
3	Lincoln	1964 (Cambridge City), 1967, 1983
1	Brookville	1971
2	Northeastern	2014, 2015
0	Knightstown	
0	Tri	
0	Union County/Short	

== Girls' ==
Titles	School	Years
19	Centerville	1981, 1984, 1985, 1987, 1988*, 1989, 1993*, 1994, 1995, 1996, 1997, 1998, 1999, 2000, 2005, 2011, 2012, 2021, 2022
9	Hagerstown	1980, 1992, 1993*, 2010, 2014, 2015, 2016, 2017, 2019
8	Winchester	1988*, 1990, 1991, 2001, 2002, 2003, 2004, 2020
6	Lincoln	1982, 1983, 1986, 2007, 2008, 2009
3	Union County	2006, 2013, 2018
0	Knightstown	
0	Northeastern	
0	Tri	
0	Union City	

== Sources ==
T.E.C. Boys Champions T.E.C. Girls Champions
