= Northeastern High School (Indiana) =

Location
- 7295 North US 27; Fountain City, Wayne County, Indiana 47341; United States; 39.9347°N 84.9123°W

Information
- Type: Public high school
- Established: 1969
- School district: Northeastern Wayne Schools
- Teaching staff: 26.50 (FTE)
- Grades: 9-12
- Enrollment: 423 (2023-24)
- Student to teacher ratio: 15.96
- Color
- Athletics conference: Tri-Eastern
- Team name: Knights
- Website: Official website

Northeastern High School is a small high school located near Fountain City in Wayne County, Indiana, USA. Founded in 1967, it serves the communities of Fountain City, Webster, Whitewater and Williamsburg.

== Athletics ==
Northeastern participates in the Tri-Eastern Conference of which it has been a member since 1974. Previously, it was a member of the Mid-Eastern Conference from 1967 to 1974. NHS enjoys a fierce conference rivalry with three other Wayne County schools (Centerville, Hagerstown and Lincoln). In the 2013–2014 season, the Knights won their first boys' basketball conference title since 1985-86 and also their first ever boys' basketball sectional title.

NHS previously held the "longest high school football losing streak in Indiana history", losing 46 games consecutively from 1985 to 1990.

== Mergers ==
School	Mascot	Colors	Year closed and merged into
Fountain City	Little Giants		1964 Whitewater-Fountain City
Webster	Pirates		1964 Webster-Williamsburg
Whitewater	Bears		1964 Whitewater-Fountain City
Williamsburg	Yellow Jackets		1964 Webster-Williamsburg
Webster-Williamsburg	Yellow Jackets		1967 Northeastern
Whitewater-Fountain City	Bearcats		1967 Northeastern

== Notable alumni ==
- Rich Mullins (1955–1997), contemporary Christian music singer
- Amy Wright (born 1980), Long Beach State (LBSU) women's basketball head coach (2023–current)

== See also ==
- List of high schools in Indiana
