= Morristown station (Indiana) =

- Junction Railroad Depot
- U.S. National Register of Historic Places
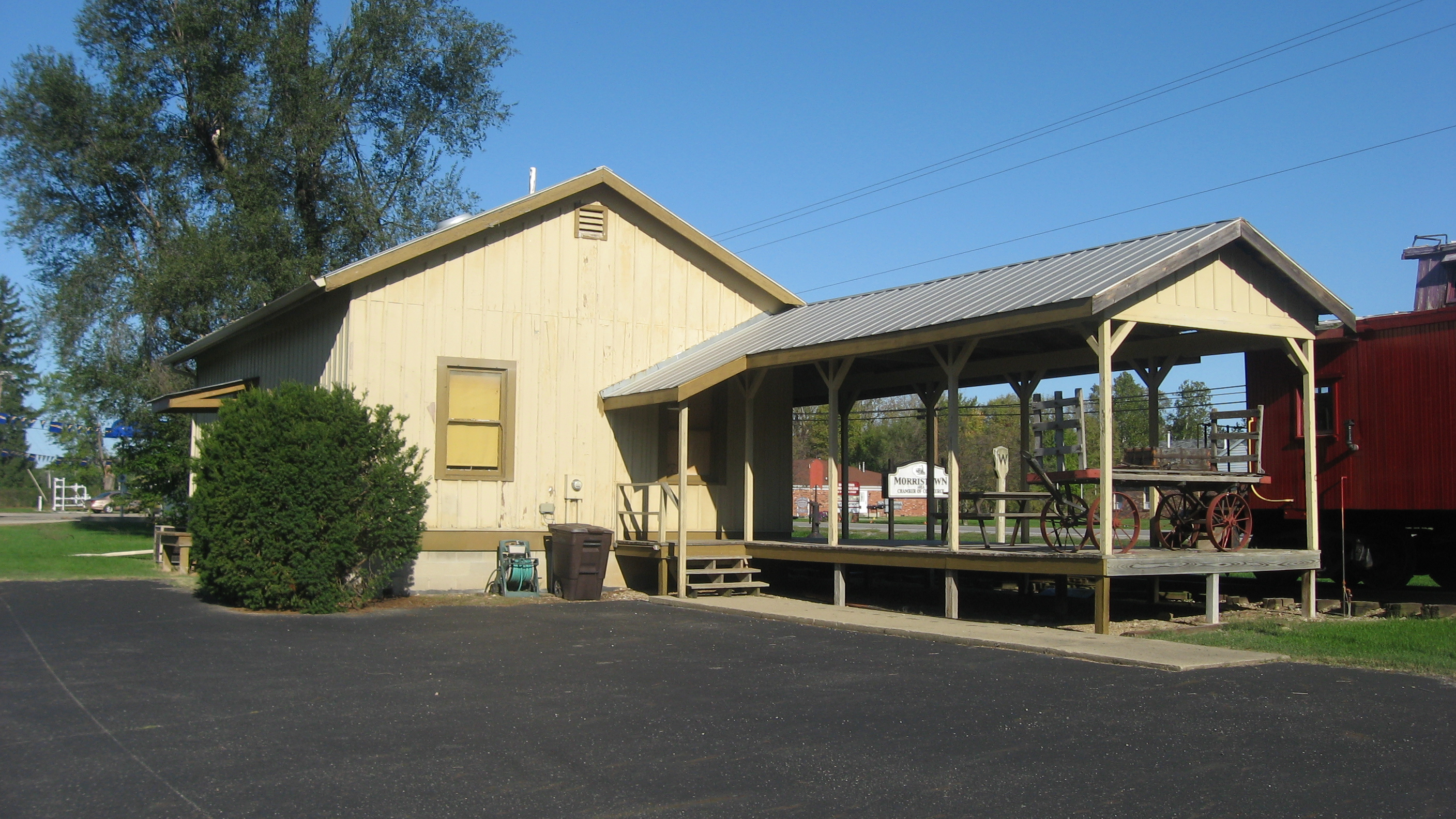
- Junction Railroad Depot, October 2011

- Location within Indiana
- Location: U.S. 52, Morristown, Indiana
- Coordinates: 39°40′27″N 85°42′9″W
- Area: less than one acre
- Built: 1867–1868
- Architect: Johnson, Samuel McGrew
- NRHP reference No.: 79000044
- Added to NRHP: November 14, 1979

Morristown station is a historic train station located at Morristown, Indiana. It was built in 1867–1868 by the Junction Railroad, and is a simple one-story, rectangular, building of pinned beam construction. It has a gable roof that extends to shelter a loading platform for 30 feet (9.1 m). The building served as both a grain elevator and train depot. It was moved to its present site in 1976 to prevent it from demolition.

It was listed on the National Register of Historic Places in 1979 as the Junction Railroad Depot.
