= Waldron Junior-Senior High School =

Location
- 102 North East Street; Waldron, Shelby County, Indiana 46182; United States
- Coordinates: 39.453168°N 85.661169°W

Information
- Type: Public high school
- School district: Shelby Eastern Schools
- Superintendent: Robert Evans
- Principal: Mark Shadiow
- Teaching staff: 23.75 (FTE)
- Grades: 6-12
- Enrollment: 306 (2023-2024)
- Student to teacher ratio: 12.88
- Color
- Athletics conference: Mid-Hoosier Conference
- Team name: Mohawks
- Website: Official website

Waldron Junior-Senior High School is a public high school located in Waldron, Indiana.

== Athletics ==
Waldron Junior-Senior High School's athletic teams are the Mohawks and they compete in the Mid-Hoosier Conference. The school offers a wide range of athletics including:

- Baseball
- Basketball (Men's and Women's)
- Cheerleading
- Cross Country (Men's and Women's)
- Football
- Gymnastics
- Softball
- Tennis (Men's and Women's)
- Track and field (Men's and Women's)
- Volleyball

=== Basketball ===
The 2003-2004 men's basketball team won the IHSAA 1A State Championship defeating Blackhawk Christian School (Fort Wayne) by a score of 69–54.

The Waldron Lady Mohawks basketball team competed in the 2019 sectional 60 finals. The game went into five overtimes, making it the longest girls' basketball game in IHSAA girls' history.

== See also ==
- List of high schools in Indiana
