= Green Township, Wayne County, Indiana =

Green Township
- Township
- Location in Wayne County
- Coordinates: 39°57′44″N 85°00′19″W
- Country: United States
- State: Indiana
- County: Wayne

Government
  - Type: Indiana township

Area
  - Total: 28.67 sq mi (74.3 km^{2})
  - Land: 28.57 sq mi (74.0 km^{2})
  - Water: 0.1 sq mi (0.26 km^{2}) 0.35%
- Elevation: 1,102 ft (336 m)

Population (2020)
  - Total: 1,305
  - Density: 42.8/sq mi (16.5/km^{2})
- Time zone: UTC-5 (Eastern (EST))
  - Summer (DST): UTC-4 (EDT)
- Area code: 765
- GNIS feature ID: 453349

Green Township is one of fifteen townships in Wayne County, Indiana, United States. As of the 2010 census, its population was 1,222 and it contained 455 housing units.

== History ==
Green Township was organized in 1821. Green Township was named for one John Green, a Native American.

== Geography ==
According to the 2010 census, the township has a total area of 28.67 square miles (74.3 km^{2}), of which 28.57 square miles (74.0 km^{2}) (or 99.65%) is land and 0.1 square miles (0.26 km^{2}) (or 0.35%) is water. The streams of Collor Creek, Fruit Branch, Hopewell Run, Morgan Creek, Town Creek, Well Brook, William Creek and Williamsburg Creek run through this township.

=== Unincorporated towns ===
- Williamsburg at 39.9508797°N 84.9963524°W

(This list is based on USGS data and may include former settlements.)

=== Adjacent townships ===
- Washington Township, Randolph County (north)
- New Garden Township (east)
- Webster Township (southeast)
- Center Township (south)
- Clay Township (southwest)
- Perry Township (west)
- Union Township, Randolph County (northwest)

=== Cemeteries ===
The township contains three cemeteries: Old Center, Old Concord and Williamsburg.

=== Major highways ===
- U.S. Route 35
