= Tri-Eastern Conference =

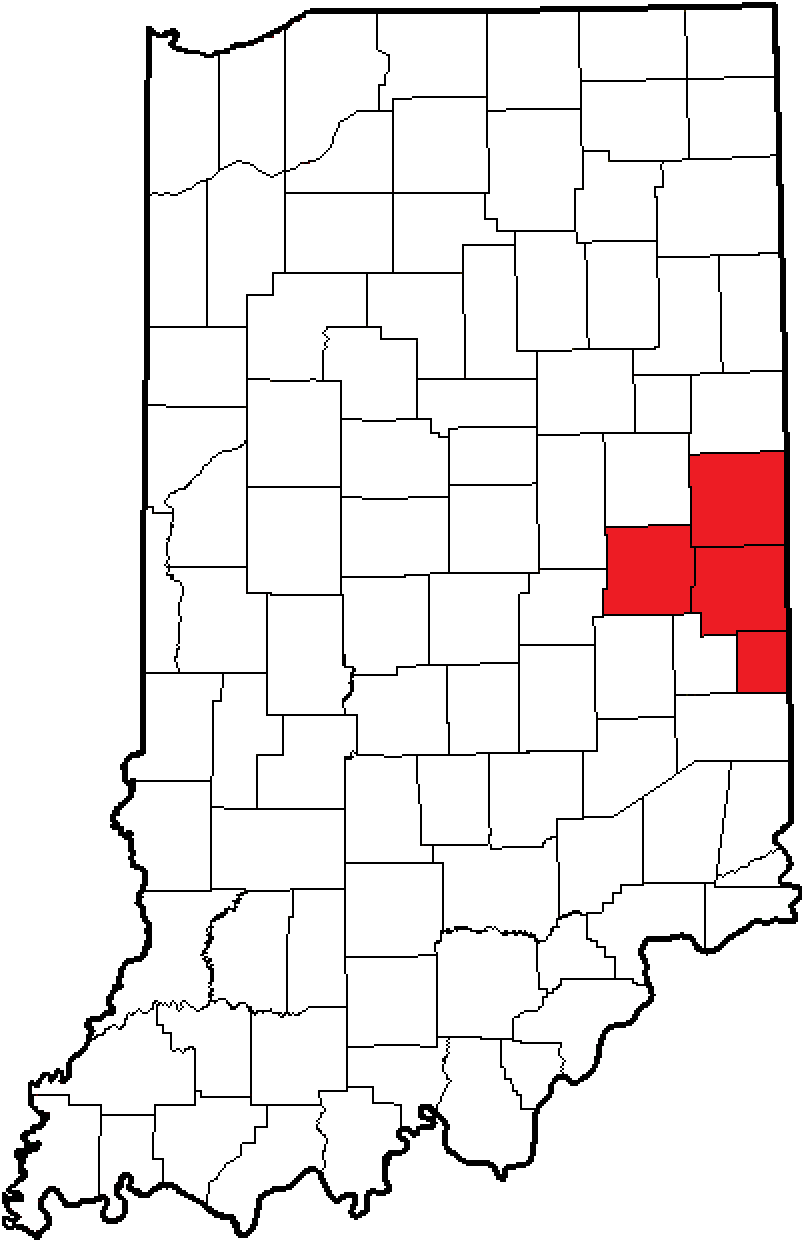
The Tri-Eastern Conference in Indiana.

The Tri-Eastern Conference is a seven-member IHSAA-Sanctioned Athletic Conference formed by five schools in 1962. The current seven teams are located in the counties of Henry, Randolph, Union, and Wayne.

== History ==
The conference was formed in 1962, with Cambridge City, Centerville, Knightstown, Liberty, and Union City. All but Centerville are current members of the conference, though two have different names through consolidation (Cambridge City became Lincoln in 1965, and Liberty consolidated into Union County in 1973). Brookville (now Franklin County) and Hagerstown joined in 1966 to bring the membership to 7, however Knightstown would leave in 1968 (with Brookville following suit in 1973). The conference would grow to 7 members in the 1970s, adding Winchester (1972) and Northeastern (1974). Tri joined in 1989 to bring the conference to eight. Knightstown would rejoin in 2017 with a phased program, with some sports joining in 2018. Centerville and Northeastern left the TEC to join the newly formed Eastern Crossroads Conference (ECC) beginning with the 2026–2027 school year.

== Membership ==
School	Location	Mascot	Colors	Enrollment 26/27	IHSAA Class	# / County	Year joined	Previous Conference	Gym Capacity
Lincoln	Cambridge; City	Eagles		154	A	89; Wayne	1965	none (new school)	1,965
Hagerstown	Hagerstown	Tigers		364	AA	89; Wayne	1966	Mississinewa Valley	2,748
Knightstown^{1}	Knightstown	Panthers		331	A	32; Henry	1962; 2017	East Central; Independents (MHC 2016)	2,225
Tri	Straughn	Titans		223	A	33; Henry	1989	Big Blue River	2,500
Union City; Community	Union; City	Indians		243	A	68; Randolph	1962	East Central	1,501
Union; County	Liberty	Patriots		337	A/AA	81; Union	1973	none (new school)	1,497
Winchester; Community	Winchester	Falcons		394	AA	68; Randolph	1972	Mississinewa Valley	2,300

1. Knightstown played 1968–89 in the Big Blue River, 1989–95, 2010–13 and 2016–17 as independents, 1995–2010 in the White River Conference, and 2013–16 in the Mid-Hoosier Conference.

=== Former members ===
School	Location	Mascot	Colors	# / County	Year joined	Previous conference	Year left	Conference joined
Cambridge City	Cambridge; City	Wampus Cats		89; Wayne	1962	Eastern Indiana	1965	none (consolidated into Lincoln)
Short^{1}	Liberty	Lancers		81; Union	1962	East Central/ Whitewater Valley	1973	none (consolidated into Union County)
Brookville	Brookville	Greyhounds		24; Franklin	1966	Eastern Indiana	1973	Eastern Indiana
Centerville	Centerville	Bulldogs		89 Wayne	1962	Tri Eastern	2026	Eastern Crossroads
Northeastern	Fountain; City	Knights		89 Wayne	1974	Tri Eastern	2026	Eastern Crossroads

1. Known as Liberty before 1965.

== Conference champions ==
=== Football ===
Football TEC Titles

Titles	School	Years
22	Hagerstown	1967, 1971, 1978, 1980, 1981, 1982, 1985, 1986*, 1990, 1993, 1994, 1997, 2000, 2001, 2003, 2006*, 2008, 2010, 2012, 2017, 2018*, 2026
18	Winchester	1974, 1975, 1979, 1983, 1984*, 1986*, 1987, 1988, 1989, 1991, 1992*, 1999, 2002, 2004, 2006*, 2009*, 2013*, 2016*
14	Centerville	1965, 1966*, 1969, 1976, 1977, 1995, 2006*, 2007, 2009*, 2011, 2020, 2021, 2022*, 2023
8	Northeastern	2013*, 2014, 2015, 2016*, 2019, 2022*, 2024, 2025
4	Tri	1992*, 1996, 2005, 2006*
3	Union County	1984*, 1986*, 1998
2	Brookville	1968, 1970
2	Cambridge City Lincoln	1964, 1966*
2	Union City	1972, 1973
1	Knightstown	2018*

Football Sectional Titles

Titles	School	Years
10	Hagerstown	1982, 1984, 1985, 1993, 1994, 1996, 1997, 1999, 2000, 2010
4	Knightstown	1992, 1997, 2005, 2007
4	Tri	1986, 1991, 2007, 2021
1	Winchester	2015

Football Regional, Semi-State, State Titles

School	Regional	Semi-State	State
Knightstown	1997, 2005	1997, 2005	
Hagerstown	1982, 1985		
Tri	2021		

=== Volleyball ===
Girls' TEC Volleyball Titles

Titles	School	Years
23	Union County	1992, 1993, 1994, 1995, 1997, 1998, 1999, 2000, 2001*, 2002, 2003, 2004, 2005, 2006, 2007*, 2008*, 2010, 2012, 2013, 2014, 2015, 2020, 2022
11	Centerville	1980, 1981, 1983*, 1984*, 1986*, 1987, 1989, 1990*, 2007*, 2008*, 2011
8	Hagerstown	1979*, 1991*, 2016, 2017, 2018, 2019, 2021, 2024
7	Winchester	1979*, 1984*, 1988*, 1990*, 2009*, 2025, 2026
6	Cambridge City Lincoln	1982, 1983*, 1985, 2001*, 2007*, 2008*
4	Northeastern	1979*, 1988*, 2009*, 2023
1	Tri	1990*
1	Union City	1986*
0	Knightstown	

Girls' Sectional Volleyball Titles

Titles	School	Years
16	Union County	1995, 1997, 1998, 1999, 2000, 2001, 2002, 2003, 2004, 2005, 2011, 2013, 2014, 2015, 2020, 2021
6	Hagerstown	1979, 1992, 2016, 2017, 2018, 2019
4	Cambridge City	1991, 1996, 2006, 2022
4	Northeastern	2009, 2022, 2023, 2025
3	Winchester	1999, 2024, 2026
2	Centerville	1997, 2000
2	Knightstown	1993, 1994
2	Union City	1973, 1974

Girls' Regional, Semi-State, State Volleyball Titles

School	Regional	Semi-State	State
Union County	1997, 1998, 2000, 2001, 2002, 2012, 2015, 2016	1997	
Winchester	1999, 2024		
Hagerstown	2016		
Centerville	2000		

=== Cross Country ===
Boys' TEC Cross Country Titles

Titles	School	Years
22	Centerville	1976*, 1977, 1978, 1979, 1980, 1981, 1982, 1983, 1984, 1985, 1986, 1987, 1988*, 1989, 1992, 1993, 1994, 1998, 1999*, 2003, 2007, 2008
16	Union City	1964, 1966, 1967, 1968, 1969, 1971, 1972*, 1973*, 1974, 1975*, 1976, 1990, 1991*, 1999*, 2000, 2001
11	Hagerstown	1995, 1996, 1997, 2012, 2013, 2014, 2015, 2016, 2017, 2024, 2025
7	Winchester	1972*, 1973*, 1988*, 1991*, 2002*, 2004, 2005
8	Northeastern	2002*, 2009, 2010, 2011, 2020, 2021, 2022, 2023
3	Cambridge City Lincoln	1970, 2018, 2019
3	Knightstown	1962, 1963, 1965
3	Union County/Liberty/Short	1975*, 2006, 2026
0	Brookville	
0	Tri	

Boys' Sectional Cross Country Titles

Titles	Schools	Years
4	Centerville	1983, 1987, 1989, 1993
4	Hagerstown	2014, 2015, 2016, 2017
3	Northeastern	2010, 2021, 2022
2	Union City	2000, 2001
1	Winchester	1991

Boys' Regional Cross Country Titles

School	Years
Centerville	1980

Girls' TEC Cross Country Titles

Titles	School	Years
14	Centerville	1989*, 1990, 1991, 1992*, 1993, 1995, 1996, 1997, 2019, 2020, 2021, 2022, 2023, 2024
8	Union County	1989*, 2006, 2007, 2008, 2014, 2015, 2016, 2017
6	Hagerstown	1988, 2011, 2012, 2013, 2018, 2026
5	Winchester	1992*, 2000, 2001, 2002, 2003
5	Northeastern	1994, 1998, 2004, 2005, 2025
2	Tri	2009, 2010
1	Union City	1999
0	Cambridge City Lincoln	
0	Knightstown	

Girls' Sectional Cross Country Titles

Titles	School	Years
4	Centerville	2019, 2020, 2021, 2022
2	Hagerstown	2010, 2011
2	Northeastern	2005, 2006
2	Union County	2007, 2008
2	Winchester	1992, 2002
1	Tri	2009

Girls' Regional Cross Country Titles

School	Years	
2	Centerville	1991, 1998

=== Boys & Girls Tennis ===
Boys' TEC Tennis Titles

Titles	School	Years
26	Centerville	1976*, 1977, 1984*, 1985, 1987, 1988, 1989, 1991, 1996, 1997*, 2000, 2001, 2002, 2003, 2004, 2005, 2006, 2007,2010, 2014*, 2016, 2017*, 2019, 2022, 2024, 2025
8	Northeastern	1986, 1993, 1994, 1995, 2011, 2012, 2013, 2015
8	Union City	1965, 1966, 1967, 1968, 1969, 1972, 1992, 2023
7	Winchester	1974, 1975, 1976*, 1990, 1997*, 1998, 1999
6	Hagerstown	1978, 1979, 1981, 2008, 2009, 2026
5	Cambridge City Lincoln	1964, 1980, 1982, 1983, 1984*
4	Knightstown	2017*, 2018, 2020, 2021
2	Brookville	1970, 1971
2	Union County/Short	1973, 2014*
0	Tri	

Boys' Sectional Tennis Titles

Titles	School	Years
12	Centerville	1997, 1999, 2000, 2001, 2002, 2003, 2007, 2009, 2011, 2022, 2024, 2025
7	Northeastern	1994, 1995, 2010, 2011, 2012, 2013, 2023
6	Winchester	2012, 2013, 2015, 2016, 2018, 2019
6	Knightstown	1991, 1992, 2018, 2019, 2020, 2021
4	Union City	1968, 1992, 2017, 2021
2	Hagerstown	2008, 2009
2	Tri	2014, 2013
1	Union County	1964
1	Cambridge City Lincoln	1982

Boys' Regional, Semi-State, State Tennis Titles

School	Regional	Semi-State	State
Centerville	1997, 1999, 2001, 2003, 2007, 2009, 2011		
Northeastern	2012, 2013	2013	

Girls' TEC Tennis Titles

Titles	School	Years
27	Centerville	1985, 1986, 1987*, 1989, 1990, 1994, 1995*, 1996, 2002, 2004*, 2005, 2006, 2010, 2011, 2012*, 2013*, 2014, 2015, 2016, 2017, 2018, 2019, 2021*, 2022*, 2023, 2024, 2025
14	Cambridge City Lincoln	1980, 1981, 1982, 1983, 1997, 1998, 1999, 2000, 2001*, 2007, 2008, 2009, 2021*, 2022*
9	Winchester	1984, 1987*, 1988, 1991, 1992, 1993, 2001*, 2003, 2004*
3	Northeastern	1995*, 2012*, 2013*
1	Hagerstown	2026
0	Tri	
0	Union City	
0	Union County	

Girls' Sectional Tennis Titles

Titles	School	Years
12	Centerville	1983, 1985, 2007, 2009, 2010, 2016, 2017, 2019, 2022, 2023, 2024, 2025
6	Cambridge City Lincoln	1997, 1998, 1999, 2000, 2001, 2021
4	Winchester	2016, 2017, 2018, 2019
1	Northeastern	2012
1	Tri	2004

Girls' Regional, Semi-State, State Tennis Titles

School	Regional	Semi-State	State
Cambridge City Lincoln	1999, 2000		
Centerville	1985, 2023		

=== Boys & Girls Golf ===
Boys' TEC Golf Titles

Titles	School	Years
18	Winchester	1975*, 1976, 1977*, 1978, 1987*, 1991, 1992, 1993, 1994, 1995, 1996, 1997*, 1999, 2000, 2001, 2002, 2008, 2012
15	Union County/Liberty	1972*(Short), 1980, 1981*, 1986, 1987*, 1988, 1989, 1990, 2006, 2013*, 2016, 2019, 2020, 2021, 2026
11	Union City	1963, 1965, 1966, 1967, 1970*, 1972*, 1973, 1974, 1975*, 2003, 2005
9	Cambridge City Lincoln	1969*, 1981*, 1982, 1983, 1984, 1985, 1997*, 1998, 2004
9	Hagerstown	1968, 1969*, 1970*, 2007, 2009, 2010, 2017, 2018, 2024
6	Centerville	1964, 1977*, 1979, 2014, 2015, 2023
4	Northeastern	2011, 2013*, 2022, 2025
2	Brookville	1971, 1972*
0	Knightstown	
0	Tri	

Boys' Sectional Golf Titles

3	Hagerstown	1959, 1969, 2018
3	Winchester	1972, 1977, 1996
2	Union County	1989, 2026
1	Knightstown	2004

Girls' TEC Golf Titles

Titles	School	Years
14	Union County	2002, 2003, 2004, 2005, 2006*, 2010, 2012, 2013*, 2017, 2022, 2023, 2024, 2025, 2026
10	Hagerstown	2006*, 2007, 2008, 2009, 2013*, 2014, 2015, 2019*, 2020
5	Winchester	2001, 2011, 2018, 2019*, 2021
1	Centerville	2016
0	Cambridge City Lincoln	
0	Northeastern	
0	Tri	
0	Union City	

Girls' Golf Sectional Titles

Titles	School	Years
3	Union County	2007, 2014, 2024
1	Winchester	2019
1	Hagerstown	2012

=== Girls Soccer (Soccer is not a TEC sport.) ===
Girls' Sectional Soccer Titles

Titles	School	Years
5	Centerville	2009, 2013, 2017, 2019, 2020
1	Union County	2018

=== Boys Soccer (Soccer is not a TEC sport.) ===
Boys' Sectional Soccer Titles

Titles	School	Years
7	Centerville	2006, 2011, 2012, 2013, 2014, 2015, 2021
2	Knightstown	2019, 2020
1	Union City	2026

=== Boys Basketball ===
Boys' TEC Basketball Titles

Titles	School	Years
22	Winchester	1975, 1977*, 1979*, 1980*, 1981*, 1982, 1991*, 1992, 1993, 1998, 1999, 2000, 2001, 2002, 2003, 2005*, 2006*, 2007, 2008, 2009, 2011, 2020
12	Union City	1963, 1966*, 1968*, 1969, 1970*, 1972*, 1973*, 1978, 1986*, 1988, 1989, 2006*
12	Liberty - Union County	1966*(Short), 1967(Short), 1973*(Short) 1974, 1976, 1977*, 1979*, 1980*, 1983*, 1985, 2012, 2018
12	Centerville	1965, 1970*, 1981*, 1986*, 1987*, 1996, 2004, 2005*, 2006*, 2010, 2024, 2026
11	Northeastern	1983*, 1984, 2014, 2015, 2016, 2017, 2019, 2021, 2022, 2023, 2025
4	Hagerstown	1990, 1995, 1997, 2013
3	Cambridge City Lincoln	1964 (Cambridge City), 1987*, 1994
3	Knightstown	1964*, 1966*, 1968*
2	Brookville	1971, 1972*
2	Tri	1991*, 2005*

Boys' Sectional Basketball Titles

Titles	School	Years
25	Winchester	1928, 1929, 1932, 1936, 1942, 1943, 1949, 1951, 1952, 1956, 1957, 1971, 1974, 1975, 1980, 1997, 1998, 1999, 2000, 2003, 2007, 2008, 2009, 2010, 2011
13	Union City	1927, 1930, 1931, 1933, 1934, 1940, 1954, 1962, 1966, 1969, 1972, 1973, 1984
9	Centerville	1944, 2004, 2005, 2006, 2009, 2010, 2011, 2025, 2026
7	Northeastern	2014, 2015, 2016, 2017, 2019, 2023, 2024
6	Union County	1976, 1977, 1979, 2012, 2013, 2018
5	Knightstown	1958, 1987, 2004, 2005, 2006
4	Hagerstown	1928, 1929, 1959, 1965
3	Tri	1976, 1977, 2015
2	Cambridge City Lincoln	1951, 1961

Boys' Regional, Semi-State, State Basketball Titles

School	Regional	Semi-State	State
Winchester	1998, 1999, 2000, 2007, 2008, 2009	2000, 2007, 2008	
Centerville	2004		
Knightstown	2005		

=== Girls Basketball ===
Girls' TEC Basketball Titles

Titles	School	Years
15	Winchester	1982*, 1984*, 1985*, 1990, 1991, 2001, 2004, 2006, 2009, 2010, 2013, 2018, 2019, 2020, 2022
12	Cambridge City Lincoln	1981, 1982*, 1983, 1984*, 1986, 1995, 1999, 2003, 2005*, 2007, 2008, 2014*, 2016
8	Tri	1994, 1996, 1997, 1998, 2000, 2014*, 2023, 2024
7	Hagerstown	1980, 1992, 1993, 2012, 2014*, 2015, 2016
5	Northeastern	1982*, 1989, 2021, 2025, 2026
3	Centerville	1984*, 1987*, 2011
3	Union City	1985*, 2002, 2017
3	Union County	1987*, 1988, 2005*
0	Knightstown	

Girls' Sectional Basketball Titles

Titles	School	Years
19	Winchester	1977, 1978, 1982, 1986, 1987, 1988, 1999, 2007, 2008, 2009, 2010, 2011, 2012, 2013, 2017, 2018, 2019, 2020, 2022
8	Union City	1985, 2000, 2001, 2002, 2003, 2016, 2017, 2024
8	Tri	1998, 2006, 2007, 2008, 2014, 2018, 2023, 2026
7	Northeastern	1990, 1996, 1997, 1998, 2011, 2024, 2025
5	Hagerstown	1993, 1994, 1995, 2009, 2015
4	Union County	2006, 2022, 2023, 2026
4	Cambridge City Lincoln	1983, 2004, 2005, 2016
4	Knightstown	1980, 2010, 2013, 2014
1	Centerville	2012

Girls' Regional, Semi-State, State Basketball Titles

School	Regional	Semi-State	State
Winchester	2010, 2011, 2018, 2019	2018, 2019	
Union City	2001, 2017, 2024	2017	
Tri	1998, 2023		
Knightstown	1980		
Northeastern	1998		

=== Wrestling ===
Wrestling TEC Titles

Titles	School	Years
24	Winchester	1980, 1982, 1983, 1984, 1989, 1990*, 1991*, 1992*, 1993, 1994, 1996*, 1997, 1998, 1999*, 2000, 2001, 2002*, 2003, 2008, 2009, 2011, 2013, 2015, 2017
21	Centerville	1965, 1967, 1977, 1978*, 1979, 1981, 1995, 1996*, 1999*, 2002*, 2006, 2007, 2014, 2016, 2019, 2020, 2021, 2022, 2023, 2024, 2026
6	Union City	1966, 1974, 1988, 1990*, 1991*, 1992*
5	Brookville	1968, 1969, 1970, 1971, 1972
5	Union County/Liberty/Short	1976, 2004, 2005, 2010, 2012
4	Hagerstown	1973, 1975, 1978, 1986
1	Northeastern	1985, 2025
1	Knightstown	2018
0	Cambridge City Lincoln	
0	Tri	

Wrestling Sectional Titles

Titles	School	Years
12	Centerville	1985, 1995, 1996, 1997, 1998, 1999, 2002, 2005, 2019, 2020, 2021, 2022
11	Winchester	1989, 1990, 1991, 1993, 1994, 1995, 1996, 1999, 2000, 2002, 2005
6	Knightstown	1972, 1976, 1984, 1997, 1998, 2018
3	Hagerstown	1976, 1983, 1985
2	Northeastern	1992, 2000
2	Tri	1978, 1979
2	Union City	1976, 1992
1	Union County	2004
0	Cambridge City Lincoln	

Wrestling Regional, Semi-State, State Titles

School	Regional	Semi-State	State
Union City	1991		
Union County	2004		

Wrestling Individual State Titles

Name	School	Year	Weight Class
Cody Phillips	Union County	2009	103 Lbs.
Michael Duckworth	Union County	2009	160 Lbs.
Adam Chalfant	Winchester	2009	Heavyweight
Cody Phillips	Union County	2010	103 Lbs.

=== Baseball ===
Baseball TEC Titles

Titles	School	Years
27	Hagerstown	1972, 1976, 1977*, 1978*, 1983, 1987, 1989*, 1991, 1994*, 1995, 1998, 1999, 2001, 2002*, 2003*, 2012, 2013, 2014, 2015, 2016, 2017, 2018, 2019, 2022, 2024, 2025, 2026*
16	Liberty-Union County	1964(Liberty), 1974, 1975, 1977*, 1980*, 1984, 1985*, 1986*, 1988, 1992, 2003*, 2004*, 2006, 2007, 2008, 2011*
13	Centerville	1963, 1965, 1977*, 1980*, 1981, 1990, 1996, 2000*, 2004*, 2005, 2009, 2011*, 2021
11	Cambridge City Lincoln	1966, 1968, 1969, 1978*, 1980*, 1982, 1986*, 1993, 1994*, 2004*, 2010
6	Winchester	1978*, 1979, 1985*, 1989*, 1993, 1997, 2000*
3	Union City	1973, 1986*, 2023
3	Northeastern	2002*, 2003*, 2026*
2	Brookville	1970, 1971
1	Knightstown	1967
0	Tri	

Baseball Sectional Titles

Titles	School	Years
13	Hagerstown	1969, 1980, 1987, 1999, 2000, 2006, 2007, 2013, 2016, 2017, 2019, 2023, 2026
9	Knightstown	1967, 1979, 1981, 2014, 2015, 2016, 2021, 2024, 2025
9	Centerville	1973, 1977, 2001, 2005, 2008, 2009, 2011, 2021, 2022
8	Union County	1978, 1985, 1998, 2000, 2010, 2012, 2017, 2018
6	Union City	2012, 2018, 2021, 2022, 2024, 2025
4	Northeastern	1968, 2002, 2003, 2004
4	Tri	1973, 1976, 1977, 2007
2	Cambridge City Lincoln	1986, 1994
2	Winchester	1986, 2023

Baseball Regional, Semi-State, State Titles

School	Regional	Semi-State	State
Centerville	2022	2022	
Knightstown	1967, 2015, 2016, 2024, 2025	2016	
Hagerstown	1999, 2006		
Tri	1976		
Union County	1998		
Union City	2024, 2025		
Winchester	2023		

=== Softball ===
Softball TEC Titles

Titles	School	Years
13	Union County	2005*, 2006, 2007, 2008, 2009, 2010, 2012*, 2013, 2017*, 2019, 2021, 2022, 2023
4	Cambridge City Lincoln	2005*, 2012*, 2014, 2018
3	Northeastern	2011, 2016, 2017*
3	Hagerstown	2024, 2025, 2026
1	Centerville	2015
0	Knightstown	
0	Tri	
0	Union City	
0	Winchester	

Softball Sectional Titles

Titles	School	Years
9	Union County	2006, 2008, 2011, 2012, 2016, 2019, 2021, 2022, 2023
8	Cambridge City Lincoln	2004, 2005, 2007, 2014, 2019, 2021, 2022, 2025
8	Tri	2014, 2015, 2016, 2017, 2018, 2023, 2024, 2025
3	Knightstown	1988, 2018, 2026
2	Centerville	2014, 2018
2	Northeastern	2017, 2026
1	Union City	2026
0	Hagerstown	
0	Winchester	

Softball Regional, Semi-State, State Titles

School	Regional	Semi-State	State
Tri	2015, 2016, 2017, 2018, 2024, 2025	2017	
Knightstown	2018		
Northeastern	2017		
Union County	2012, 2019, 2021		
Cambridge City	2019		

=== Boys & Girls Track ===
Boys' TEC Track Titles

Titles	School	Years
27	Centerville	1968, 1970, 1971, 1975, 1981, 1982, 1983, 1984, 1985, 1986, 1987, 1988, 1989, 1990, 2001*, 2002, 2003, 2004, 2005, 2006, 2007, 2008, 2009, 2010, 2011, 2012, 2013
15	Hagerstown	1972, 1994, 1995, 1996, 1997, 1998, 2015, 2016, 2017, 2018, 2019, 2021, 2022, 2023, 2024
8	Union City	1964, 1965, 1969, 1973, 1974, 1976, 2000, 2001
5	Winchester	1977, 1978, 1992, 1993, 2025
5	Northeastern	1979, 1980, 1991, 1999, 2026
3	Knightstown	1963, 1966, 1967
1	Union County/Liberty/Short	2014
0	Brookville	
0	Cambridge City Lincoln	
0	Tri	

Boys' Sectional Track Titles

Titles	School	Years
2	Centerville	1989, 2008
1	Cambridge City Lincoln	2009
1	Hagerstown	2018

Boys' Individual State Titles

Name	School	Year	Event
Harold White	Union City	1923	880
Harold White	Union City	1923	Mile
Brent Campbell	Winchester	1992	300 LH
Rocky Moore	Union County	2000	Shot Put
Rocky Moore	Union County	2000	Discus
Ben Stephen	Union County	2007	Shot Put

Girls' TEC Track Titles

Titles	School	Years
16	Centerville	1983, 1984, 1996, 1997, 1998, 1999, 2000, 2005, 2006*, 2007, 2016, 2018, 2019, 2021, 2023, 2024
14	Hagerstown	1980, 1982, 1986, 1987, 1988, 1989, 1992, 1995, 2011, 2012, 2013, 2014, 2015, 2022
6	Union County	1985, 1990, 1991, 1994, 2010, 2017
6	Winchester	1993, 2001*, 2003, 2004, 2006*, 2025
2	Cambridge City Lincoln	1981, 2008
2	Union City	2001*, 2002
1	Northeastern	2026
0	Knightstown	
0	Tri	

Girls' Sectional Track Titles

Titles	School	Years
4	Hagerstown	1985, 1986, 1987, 2012
1	Centerville	1984

Girls All-Sport Titles

Titles	School	Years
19	Centerville	1981, 1984, 1985, 1987, 1988*, 1989, 1993*, 1994, 1995, 1996, 1997, 1998, 1999, 2000, 2005, 2011, 2012, 2022, 2023
9	Hagerstown	1980, 1992, 1993*, 2010, 2014, 2015, 2016, 2017, 2026
7	Winchester	1988*, 1990, 1991, 2001, 2002, 2003, 2004
6	Cambridge City Lincoln	1982, 1983, 1986, 2007, 2008, 2009
4	Union County	2006, 2013, 2018, 2019
3	Northeastern	2021, 2024, 2025
0	Knightstown	
0	Tri	
0	Union City	

Boys All-Sport Titles

Titles	School	Years
22	Centerville	1965, 1977, 1979, 1980, 1981, 1982, 1985, 1994, 1995, 1996, 2001, 2004, 2005, 2006, 2008, 2009, 2010, 2011, 2012, 2021, 2023, 2024
17	Winchester	1975, 1976, 1978, 1984, 1987, 1988, 1989, 1990, 1991, 19192, 1993, 19197, 1999, 2000, 2002, 2003, 2007
8	Union City	1963, 1966, 1968, 1969, 1970, 1972, 1973, 1974
6	Hagerstown	1998, 2013, 2016, 2027, 2018, 2019
5	Northeastern	2014, 2015, 2022, 2025, 2026
1	Cambridge City Lincoln	1983
0	Knightstown	
0	Tri	
0	Union County	

== Resources ==
- IHSAA Conferences
- IHSAA Directory
