= South Decatur Junior-Senior High School =

Location
- 8885 South SR 3 Greensburg, Indiana 47240; United States
- Coordinates: 39.206834°N 85.576683°W

Information
- Type: Public high school
- Established: 1968
- School district: Decatur County Community Schools
- Superintendent: Jarrod Burns
- Principal: Eric Foga
- Faculty: 36.00
- Grades: 7-12
- Enrollment: 392 (2023-24)
- Student to teacher ratio: 10.89
- Color
- Team name: Cougars
- Rivals: North Decatur Chargers
- Website: Official Website

South Decatur Junior-Senior High School is a middle school and high school located in Greensburg, Indiana.

== Athletics ==
While the majority of sports at South Decatur Junior-Senior High School compete in the Mid-Hoosier Conference, the football program competes in the Mid-Indiana Football Conference.

Construction on the South Decatur building began in 1967. The school first opened in 1968. The school was created as a merger of the Jackson Township School, Sand Creek School and Burney School. In May 1968, the student council met and decided on maroon and white as the school colors and that the nickname would be the Cougars. A.C. Graber was the first principal of South Decatur and the gymnasium was dedicated on October 27, 1968.

== See also ==
- List of high schools in Indiana
- North Decatur Junior-Senior High School
- Mid-Hoosier Conference
- Mid-Indiana Football Conference
- Greensburg, Indiana
