= Triton Central High School =

Location
- 4774 West 600 North; Fairland, Shelby County, Indiana 46176; United States
- 39.611209°N 85.873442°W

Information
- Type: Public high school
- School district: Northwestern Consolidated School Corporation
- Principal: Cary Chandler
- Teaching staff: 28.00 (FTE)
- Grades: 9-12
- Enrollment: 469 (2023-2024)
- Student to teacher ratio: 16.75
- Color
- Athletics conference: Indiana Crossroads Conference
- Team name: Tigers
- Website: Official website

Triton Central High School is a public high school located approximately 2 miles northwest of Fairland, Indiana.

== Athletics ==
Triton Central High School's athletic teams are the Tigers and they compete in the Indiana Crossroads Conference. The school offers a wide range of athletics including:

- Baseball
- Basketball (Men's and Women's)
- Cheerleading
- Cross Country
- Football
- Golf (Men's and Women's)
- Soccer
- Softball
- Tennis (Men's and Women's)
- Track and Field (Men's and Women's)
- Volleyball
- Wrestling

Conference History

Conference	Years
Big Blue River	1971-1988
Rangeline	1989-1994
Mid-Indiana Football	1995-2011
Indiana Crossroads	2012-2022

=== Baseball ===
The 2002-2003 Baseball team won the IHSAA 2A State Championship with Rob Robertson as head coach.

== See also ==
- List of high schools in Indiana
