= Centerville Senior High School =

Location
- 507 Willow Grove Road; Centerville, Indiana 47330; United States; 39°48′43″N 85°00′3″W

Information
- Type: Public high school
- School district: Centerville-Abington Community Schools
- Principal: Brian Bellew
- Teaching staff: 37.99 (FTE)
- Grades: 9-12
- Enrollment: 515 (2023-2024)
- Student to teacher ratio: 13.92
- Color
- Fight song: Go, Go You Bulldogs
- Athletics conference: Tri-Eastern
- Team name: Bulldogs
- Rival: Hagerstown Tigers and Lincoln Eagles
- Newspaper: The Dawg Dispatch
- Website: chs.centerville.k12.in.us

Centerville Senior High School is a public high school located in Centerville, Indiana. It is the primary High School in the Centerville-Abington Community School Cooperation. The school serves students from the town of Centerville, Center Township, and Abington Township.

== Facilities ==
The current high school building was built in 1961 with additions added in 1967,1976 and 1981. In 1994, the building was remodeled and up-dated. During the 2000–2002 school year, four new science rooms, a wellness center, and air conditioning were added. The structure now includes 36 classrooms, 4 industrial arts areas, a home economic area, 2 gymnasiums, a guidance area, a swimming pool, an auditorium, 3 computer labs, 2 music areas, a library, a kitchen, and a cafeteria.

== Athletics ==
Centerville High School competes in the Tri-Eastern Conference. The Bulldogs have captured over 190 conference titles since joining in 1962.

At the IHSAA State level, the Bulldogs have captured over 60 Sectional titles, 12 Regional titles, and been to 1 State Championship game.

The Centerville High School marching band, known as the Centerville Blue Regiment, has been a frequent competitor in the Indiana State Fair Band Day since the 1940s. The group has earned consistent recognition in both the Central Indiana Track Show Association (CITSA) circuit and at Band Day. Since 2000, the Blue Regiment has placed in the Band Day Finals more than a dozen times, including a 2nd-place finish in 2021 with the show Jazz Magic.

== Notable alumni ==
- Barry Jones (MLB pitcher)

== See also ==
- List of high schools in Indiana
