= Tri Junior-Senior High School =

Tri Junior-senior High School

Location
- 6972 South State Road 103; Straughn, Indiana, (Henry County) 47387; United States
- 39.8329°N 85.3510°W

Information
- Type: Public high school
- School district: South Henry School Corporation
- Principal: Scott Widner
- Teaching staff: 32.50 (FTE)
- Grades: 6-12
- Enrollment: 458 (2024-2025)
- Student to teacher ratio: 14.09
- Color
- Athletics conference: Tri-Eastern
- Team name: Titans
- Website: www.shenry.k12.in.us/o/tjshs

Tri Junior-Senior High School is a public high school which serves the communities of Spiceland, Straughn, Lewisville, New Lisbon and Dunreith in Indiana.

== About ==
Tri Junior-Senior High School is serviced by the South Henry School Corporation. The school was founded in 1968, after the closure of Spiceland, Straughn and Lewisville High Schools (New Lisbon had merged into Straughn in 1957), it sits north of Lewisville on State Route 103.

== Athletics ==
Tri is a member of the Tri-Eastern Conference (TEC) since the 1988-89 year and abides by the rules of the IHSAA. Before joining the TEC, Tri was a member of the Big Blue River Conference from the school's opening to the conference's closure.

== See also ==
- List of high schools in Indiana
