= Edinburgh Community High School =

Location
- 300 South Keeley Street; Edinburgh, (Johnson County), Indiana 46124; United States
- Coordinates: 39.351590°N 85.970547°W

Information
- Type: Public high school
- Principal: Kevin Rockey
- Teaching staff: 16.00 (FTE)
- Grades: 9-12
- Enrollment: 232 (2024-2025)
- Student to teacher ratio: 14.50
- Colors: Red, black, and white
- Athletics conference: Mid-Hoosier
- Team name: Lancers
- Website: Official website

Edinburgh Community High School is a public high school located in the south suburban Indianapolis community of Edinburgh, Indiana, United States. The campus consists of the 1957 Lancer Gymnasium and vocational wing, which are interconnected via walkway to the two-story academic wing, built in 1971. A community center and administration building were built north of the high school in 1980.

== History ==
In 1838, George Cutsinger donated land at 500 East Main Cross for a public school. This school burned in 1867 and was replaced in 1869 by a new building on Schoolhouse Hill north of the present high school. This two-story brick building was used until 1911, and the school was razed and replaced a year later with the gymnasium and vocational areas added in the basement. In 1924, a new junior/senior high school was annexed to the north to accommodate the influx of new students related to the opening of nearby Camp Atterbury. A separate annex was added in 1953. The high school students relocated to a new nearby building in 1971, and the building on Schoolhouse Hill was reused as a middle school until 1980, when it was torn down.

The Edinburgh Community School Corporation discussed renaming the athletic field on Campbell Street at the west end of campus in memory of former physical education teacher Steve Hollenbeck, following his death in 2012.

In 2014 the bleachers at the school were damaged by high winds.

The school's 2013-14 handbook contains a history of the school corporation.

== Program ==
Along with other Johnson County schools, Edinburgh CHS is making use of modern computer and online technology to improve communication between students, parents and teachers, reducing paper use and presenting students with better access to information.

== Extracurricular activities ==
- Fall sports: boys' tennis, girls' golf, cross country, football, volleyball, marching band
- Winter sports: basketball, cheerleading, pep band
- Spring sports: baseball/softball, girls' tennis, track, boys' golf
- Clubs: Audio/Visual, Business Club, Chess Club, Drama Club, Euchre Club, French Club, National Honor Society, Spanish Club, Students Against Drunk Driving, Student Council

== See also ==
- List of high schools in Indiana
