= North Decatur Junior-Senior High School =

Location
- 3172 North SR 3 Greensburg, Decatur County, Indiana 47240; United States
- Coordinates: 39.383003°N 85.477670°W

Information
- Type: Public high school
- Established: 1967
- School district: Decatur County Community Schools
- Superintendent: Jarrod Burns
- Principal: Nick Messer
- Faculty: 39.50 (on an FTE basis)
- Grades: 7-12
- Enrollment: 460 (2023–2024)
- Student to teacher ratio: 11.65
- Color(s)
- Team name: Chargers
- Website: Official Website

North Decatur Junior-Senior High School is a middle school and high school located in Greensburg, Indiana.

== Athletics ==
While the majority of sports at North Decatur Junior-Senior High School compete in the Mid-Hoosier Conference, the football program competes in the Mid-Indiana Football Conference.

== See also ==
- List of high schools in Indiana
- South Decatur Junior-Senior High School
- Mid-Hoosier Conference
- Mid-Indiana Football Conference
- Greensburg, Indiana
