= Hagerstown Jr./Sr. High School =

Hagerstown Junior-Senior High School

Location
- 701 Baker Road; Hagerstown, (Wayne County), Indiana 47346; United States; 39.9205°N 85.1611°W

Information
- Type: Public high school
- Established: 1898
- School district: Nettle Creek School Corporation
- Principal: Jordan McCaslin
- Teaching staff: 34.00 (FTE)
- Grades: 7–12
- Enrollment: 542 (2023-2024)
- Student to teacher ratio: 15.94
- Colors: Purple, gold, white
- Athletics conference: Tri-Eastern
- Team name: Tigers
- Rival: Centerville High School
- Yearbook: Epitome
- Website: Official website

Hagerstown Jr.-Sr. High School is a High School located in Hagerstown, Indiana, United States. It serves the Nettle Creek School Corporation, which also includes the towns of Economy and Greensfork, both of which had their own schools until they were merged into Hagerstown.

== Athletics ==
The Hagerstown Tigers wear purple, gold, and white and participate as members of the Tri-Eastern Conference along with Wayne County schools: Centerville, Northeastern, and Lincoln. The Tigers are host to the Wayne County boys' and girls' varsity basketball tournaments, along with the area boys' basketball sectional for the 2A level.

== Notable alumni ==
- Ralph Teetor, inventor of cruise control
- Clark Wissler, anthropologist, ethnologist, and archaeologist

== See also ==
- List of high schools in Indiana
