= Shenandoah High School (Indiana) =

Location
- 7354 West U.S. Route 36; Middletown, Indiana 47356; United States
- 40.005761°N 85.525652°W

Information
- Type: Public
- School district: Shenandoah School Corporation
- Principal: Greg Allen
- Teaching staff: 27.33 (FTE)
- Grades: 9–12
- Enrollment: 400 (2023-2024)
- Student to teacher ratio: 14.64
- Color
- Athletics conference: Mid-Eastern Conference; Eastern Crossroads Conference (starting in 2027–28)
- Team name: Raiders
- Website: shs.sscraiders.org

Shenandoah High School is a public high school located near Middletown, Indiana in Henry County.

The school was created out of the consolidation of the high schools in Sulphur Springs, Cadiz, and Middletown in 1967. The school (and school district) was named after settlers who came to the area from the Shenandoah Valley in Virginia.

== See also ==
- List of high schools in Indiana
