= Mount Summit, Indiana =

- Town
- Location of Mount Summit in Henry County, Indiana.
- Coordinates: 40°00′04″N 85°23′09″W
- Country: United States
- State: Indiana
- County: Henry
- Township: Prairie

Area
  - Total: 0.19 sq mi (0.50 km^{2})
  - Land: 0.19 sq mi (0.50 km^{2})
  - Water: 0 sq mi (0.00 km^{2})
- Elevation: 1,106 ft (337 m)

Population (2020)
  - Total: 342
  - Estimate (2025): 356 ▲
  - Density: 1,785.1/sq mi (689.22/km^{2})
- Time zone: UTC-5 (Eastern (EST))
  - Summer (DST): UTC-4 (EDT)
- ZIP code: 47361
- Area code: 765
- FIPS code: 18-51714
- GNIS feature ID: 2396792
- Website: www.townofmountsummit.com

Mount Summit is a town in Prairie Township, Henry County, Indiana, United States. The population was 342 at the 2020 census.

== History ==
Mount Summit was platted in 1854. It was named for its lofty elevation. A post office has been in operation in Mount Summit since 1869.

== Geography ==
According to the 2010 census, Mount Summit has a total area of 0.19 square miles (0.49 km^{2}), all land.

== Highways ==
- US 36
- State Road 3

== Demographics ==
Historical population
Census	Pop.	Note	%±
1870	108		—
1880	200		85.2%
1890	231		15.5%
1910	193		—
1920	274		42.0%
1930	274		0.0%
1940	265		−3.3%
1950	295		11.3%
1960	424		43.7%
1970	395		−6.8%
1980	357		−9.6%
1990	238		−33.3%
2000	313		31.5%
2010	352		12.5%
2020	342		−2.8%
2025 (est.)	356	▲	4.1%
U.S. Decennial Census

=== 2010 census ===
As of the census of 2010, there were 352 people, 139 households, and 96 families living in the town. The population density was 1,852.6 inhabitants per square mile (715.3/km^{2}). There were 152 housing units at an average density of 800.0 per square mile (308.9/km^{2}). The racial makeup of the town was 97.2% White, 0.3% Native American, 0.6% from other races, and 2.0% from two or more races. Hispanic or Latino of any race were 2.3% of the population.

There were 139 households, of which 36.0% had children under the age of 18 living with them, 51.1% were married couples living together, 12.9% had a female householder with no husband present, 5.0% had a male householder with no wife present, and 30.9% were non-families. 27.3% of all households were made up of individuals, and 8.6% had someone living alone who was 65 years of age or older. The average household size was 2.53 and the average family size was 3.04.

The median age in the town was 42.1 years. 25% of residents were under the age of 18; 7.2% were between the ages of 18 and 24; 21.9% were from 25 to 44; 32.5% were from 45 to 64; and 13.6% were 65 years of age or older. The gender makeup of the town was 50.6% male and 49.4% female.

=== 2000 census ===
As of the census of 2000, there were 313 people, 128 households, and 89 families living in the town. The population density was 1,747.0 inhabitants per square mile (674.5/km^{2}). There were 132 housing units at an average density of 736.8 per square mile (284.5/km^{2}). The racial makeup of the town was 98.40% White, 0.96% African American, and 0.64% from two or more races. Hispanic or Latino of any race were 3.51% of the population.

There were 128 households, out of which 28.1% had children under the age of 18 living with them, 60.2% were married couples living together, 5.5% had a female householder with no husband present, and 29.7% were non-families. 25.8% of all households were made up of individuals, and 12.5% had someone living alone who was 65 years of age or older. The average household size was 2.45 and the average family size was 2.92.

In the town, the population was spread out, with 24.9% under the age of 18, 6.7% from 18 to 24, 29.4% from 25 to 44, 23.6% from 45 to 64, and 15.3% who were 65 years of age or older. The median age was 38 years. For every 100 females, there were 95.6 males. For every 100 females age 18 and over, there were 91.1 males.

The median income for a household in the town was $48,000, and the median income for a family was $53,375. Males had a median income of $33,281 versus $22,321 for females. The per capita income for the town was $20,895. About 5.4% of families and 5.3% of the population were below the poverty line, including 2.7% of those under age 18 and none of those age 65 or over.
