= Morristown Junior-Senior High School =

Location
- 223 South Patterson Street; Morristown, Indiana 46161; United States; 39°40′20″N 85°42′5″W

Information
- Type: Public high school
- School district: Shelby Eastern Schools
- Superintendent: Todd Hitchcock
- Principal: Andrew Shores
- Teaching staff: 26.00 (FTE)
- Grades: 6-12
- Enrollment: 333 (2024-2025)
- Student to teacher ratio: 12.81
- Colors: Black, white and yellow
- Athletics conference: Mid-Hoosier Conference
- Nickname: Yellow Jackets
- Website: www.shelbyeastern.org/o/mjsh

Morristown Junior-Senior High School is located in Morristown, Indiana, United States. It serves grades 6-12 for the Shelby Eastern Schools.

== See also ==
- List of high schools in Indiana
