= Union County High School (Indiana) =

Location
- 410 Patriot Blvd. Liberty, (Union County), Indiana 47353; United States; 39.6350°N 84.9207°W

Information
- Type: Public high school
- Established: 1973
- School district: Union County–College Corner Joint School District
- Principal: Connie Rosenberger
- Teaching staff: 27.75 (FTE)
- Grades: 9-12
- Enrollment: 391 (2023-2024)
- Student to teacher ratio: 14.09
- Colors: Red, white, and blue
- Athletics conference: Tri-Eastern Conference
- Team name: Patriots
- Website: Official Website

Union County High School is a public high school located in Liberty, Indiana, United States. It is part of the Union County–College Corner Joint School District (UCCCJSD), and was built in 1973 after the merger of Short High School (Liberty, Brownsville and Kitchel High Schools) and College Corner High School.

== Athletics ==
Union County has been a member of the Tri-Eastern Conference since the school was founded, and has had the most success in baseball, volleyball, softball, and boys' basketball.

== Mergers ==
| School | Mascot | Colors | Closed/merged into |
|---|---|---|---|
| Brownsville | Lions | | 1961/Short |
| Liberty | Lancers | | 1961/Short |
| Kitchel/Harrison Township | Cowboys | | 1961/Short |
| Short High School | Lancers | | 1965/Union County |
| College Corner | Trojans | | 1973/Union County |

== See also ==
- List of high schools in Indiana
