= Morristown, Indiana =

- Town
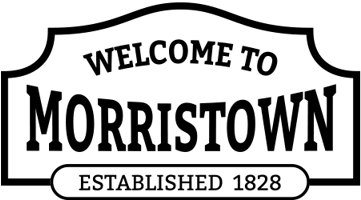
- Logo

- Location of Morristown in Shelby County, Indiana.
- Coordinates: 39°40′26″N 85°42′18″W
- Country: United States
- State: Indiana
- County: Shelby
- Township: Hanover

Area
  - Total: 2.52 sq mi (6.52 km^{2})
  - Land: 2.50 sq mi (6.47 km^{2})
  - Water: 0.019 sq mi (0.05 km^{2})
- Elevation: 820 ft (250 m)

Population (2020)
  - Total: 1,205
  - Density: 482.3/sq mi (186.23/km^{2})
- Time zone: UTC-5 (Eastern (EST))
  - Summer (DST): UTC-4 (EDT)
- ZIP code: 46161
- Area code: 765
- FIPS code: 18-51192
- GNIS feature ID: 2396783
- Website: www.morristown.in.gov

Morristown is a town in Hanover Township, Shelby County, in the U.S. state of Indiana. As of the 2020 census, Morristown had a population of 1,205.

== History ==
Morristown was platted in 1828 by Samuel Morrison, and named for him. The Morristown post office has been in operation since 1834.

Junction Railroad Depot was listed on the National Register of Historic Places in 1979.

== Geography ==
According to the 2010 census, Morristown has a total area of 2.37 square miles (6.14 km^{2}), of which 2.35 square miles (6.09 km^{2}) (or 99.16%) is land and 0.02 square miles (0.05 km^{2}) (or 0.84%) is water.

== Demographics ==
Historical population
Census	Pop.	Note	%±
1880	375		—
1890	561		49.6%
1900	565		0.7%
1910	622		10.1%
1920	658		5.8%
1930	608		−7.6%
1940	665		9.4%
1950	679		2.1%
1960	704		3.7%
1970	838		19.0%
1980	989		18.0%
1990	980		−0.9%
2000	1,133		15.6%
2010	1,218		7.5%
2020	1,205		−1.1%
U.S. Decennial Census

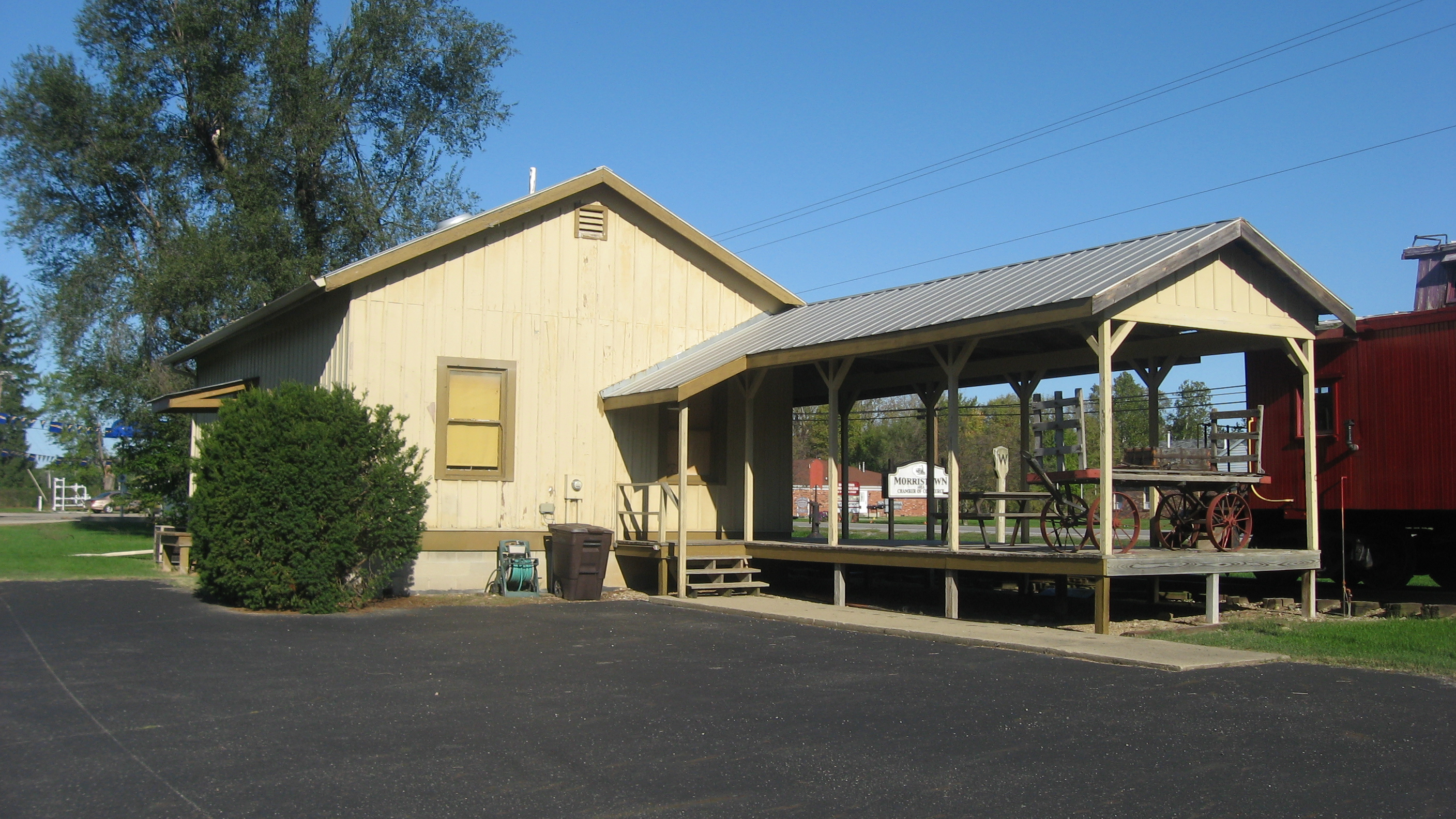
The Junction Railroad Depot in Morristown is listed on the National Register of Historic Places

=== 2020 census ===
As of the 2020 census, Morristown had a population of 1,205. The median age was 41.9 years. 22.7% of residents were under the age of 18 and 22.4% of residents were 65 years of age or older. For every 100 females there were 90.1 males, and for every 100 females age 18 and over there were 84.4 males age 18 and over.

0.0% of residents lived in urban areas, while 100.0% lived in rural areas.

There were 460 households in Morristown, of which 31.5% had children under the age of 18 living in them. Of all households, 43.7% were married-couple households, 18.9% were households with a male householder and no spouse or partner present, and 31.1% were households with a female householder and no spouse or partner present. About 31.5% of all households were made up of individuals and 13.3% had someone living alone who was 65 years of age or older.

There were 504 housing units, of which 8.7% were vacant. The homeowner vacancy rate was 3.3% and the rental vacancy rate was 4.3%.

Racial composition as of the 2020 census
Race	Number	Percent
White	1,148	95.3%
Black or African American	10	0.8%
American Indian and Alaska Native	1	0.1%
Asian	2	0.2%
Native Hawaiian and Other Pacific Islander	0	0.0%
Some other race	16	1.3%
Two or more races	28	2.3%
Hispanic or Latino (of any race)	29	2.4%

=== 2010 census ===
As of the census of 2010, there were 1,218 people, 467 households, and 311 families living in the town. The population density was 518.3 inhabitants per square mile (200.1/km^{2}). There were 519 housing units at an average density of 220.9 per square mile (85.3/km^{2}). The racial makeup of the town was 98.6% White, 0.1% African American, 0.7% Native American, 0.1% Asian, and 0.6% from two or more races. Hispanic or Latino of any race were 1.3% of the population.

There were 467 households, of which 36.2% had children under the age of 18 living with them, 43.0% were married couples living together, 18.0% had a female householder with no husband present, 5.6% had a male householder with no wife present, and 33.4% were non-families. 29.6% of all households were made up of individuals, and 12.3% had someone living alone who was 65 years of age or older. The average household size was 2.41 and the average family size was 2.95.

The median age in the town was 38 years. 24.7% of residents were under the age of 18; 8% were between the ages of 18 and 24; 24.9% were from 25 to 44; 21.4% were from 45 to 64; and 20.9% were 65 years of age or older. The gender makeup of the town was 45.4% male and 54.6% female.

=== 2000 census ===
As of the census of 2000, there were 1,133 people, 426 households, and 296 families living in the town. The population density was 1,182.2 inhabitants per square mile (456.4/km^{2}). There were 444 housing units at an average density of 463.3 per square mile (178.9/km^{2}). The racial makeup of the town was 98.94% White, 0.53% Native American, 0.09% Asian, and 0.44% from two or more races. Hispanic or Latino of any race were 0.53% of the population.

There were 426 households, out of which 38.3% had children under the age of 18 living with them, 55.4% were married couples living together, 10.6% had a female householder with no husband present, and 30.3% were non-families. 27.9% of all households were made up of individuals, and 13.8% had someone living alone who was 65 years of age or older. The average household size was 2.58 and the average family size was 3.12.

In the town, the population was spread out, with 28.0% under the age of 18, 9.1% from 18 to 24, 29.0% from 25 to 44, 18.2% from 45 to 64, and 15.7% who were 65 years of age or older. The median age was 35 years. For every 100 females, there were 89.1 males. For every 100 females age 18 and over, there were 84.6 males.

The median income for a household in the town was $36,417, and the median income for a family was $44,327. Males had a median income of $32,625 versus $23,295 for females. The per capita income for the town was $16,129. About 2.4% of families and 5.5% of the population were below the poverty line, including 5.2% of those under age 18 and 9.7% of those age 65 or over.

== Education ==
Morristown is the location of Morristown Elementary and Morristown Junior-Senior High School.

Morristown has a public library, a branch of the Shelby County Public Library.
