= Williamsburg, Indiana =

- Unincorporated community Census designated place
- Location within Indiana Location within the United States
- Coordinates: 39°57′02″N 84°59′57″W
- Country: United States
- State: Indiana
- County: Wayne
- Township: Green
- Elevation: 1,063 ft (324 m)
- Time zone: UTC-5 (Eastern (EST))
  - Summer (DST): UTC-4 (EDT)
- ZIP code: 47393
- Area code: 765
- GNIS feature ID: 2830578

Williamsburg is an unincorporated community and census designated place (CDP) in Green Township, Wayne County, in the U.S. state of Indiana.

The children of this community attend Northeastern Wayne Schools.

== History ==
The earliest settlers in the Williamsburg area arrived from North Carolina in 1810, before Indiana became a state. The town was laid out and platted in 1830, and was named after its founder, William Johnson. The post office at Williamsburg has been in operation since 1830.

== Demographics ==
Historical population
Census	Pop.	Note	%±
2023 (est.)	473

The United States Census Bureau defined Williamsburg as a census designated place in the 2022 American Community Survey.
