= Knightstown High School (Indiana) =

Location
- 8149 W U.S. Hwy 40; Knightstown, Henry County, Indiana 46148; United States
- 39.792531°N 85.541986°W

Information
- Type: Public high school
- School district: Charles A Beard Memorial School Corporation
- Principal: Danielle Carmichael
- Teaching staff: 27.33 (FTE)
- Grades: 9-12
- Enrollment: 317 (2023-2024)
- Student to teacher ratio: 11.60
- Color
- Athletics conference: Tri-Eastern Conference (IHSAA)
- Team name: Panthers
- Website: Official Website

Knightstown High School is a high school located in Knightstown, Indiana.

== About ==
Knightstown High School offers AP and ACP (Advanced College Project) credits.

== Athletics ==
Knightstown High School competes in the IHSAA in the Tri-Eastern Conference. Its cheerleading squad has won the State Championship in 2000, 2004, 2005, 2012 and 2013.

== Notable alumni ==
- Ruby Green Smith (1878–1960), entomologist, peace campaigner and home economics educator

== See also ==
- List of high schools in Indiana
