= Franklin County High School (Indiana) =

Public school in Indiana, United States

Location
- 1 Wildcat Lane; Brookville, Franklin County, Indiana 47012; United States; 39.4286°N 84.9988°W

Information
- Type: Public high school
- School district: Franklin County Community School Corporation
- Principal: Michelle South
- Teaching staff: 38.83 (FTE)
- Grades: 9–12
- Enrollment: 650 (2023–2024)
- Student to teacher ratio: 16.74
- Color
- Team name: Wildcats
- Rivals: East Central Trojans
- Website: fchs.fccsc.k12.in.us

Franklin County High School is a high school located in Brookville, Indiana, United States.

== See also ==
- List of high schools in Indiana
