= Straughn, Indiana =

- Town
- Location of Straughn in Henry County, Indiana.
- Coordinates: 39°48′30″N 85°17′27″W
- Country: United States
- State: Indiana
- County: Henry
- Township: Dudley

Area
  - Total: 0.14 sq mi (0.37 km^{2})
  - Land: 0.14 sq mi (0.37 km^{2})
  - Water: 0 sq mi (0.00 km^{2})
- Elevation: 1,079 ft (329 m)

Population (2020)
  - Total: 259
  - Estimate (2025): 266 ▲
  - Density: 1,835.9/sq mi (708.85/km^{2})
- Time zone: UTC-5 (Eastern (EST))
  - Summer (DST): UTC-4 (EDT)
- ZIP code: 47387
- Area code: 765
- FIPS code: 18-73664
- GNIS feature ID: 2397685

Straughn is a town in Dudley Township, Henry County, Indiana, United States. The population was 259 at the 2020 census.

== History ==
Straughn was platted in 1868. It was named for Merriman Straughn, a pioneer settler.

== Geography ==
According to the 2010 census, Straughn has a total area of 0.14 square miles (0.36 km^{2}), all land.

== Demographics ==
Historical population
Census	Pop.	Note	%±
1880	143		—
1890	200		39.9%
1900	186		−7.0%
1910	234		25.8%
1920	261		11.5%
1930	212		−18.8%
1940	275		29.7%
1950	345		25.5%
1960	349		1.2%
1970	329		−5.7%
1980	331		0.6%
1990	318		−3.9%
2000	263		−17.3%
2010	222		−15.6%
2020	259		16.7%
2025 (est.)	266	▲	2.7%
U.S. Decennial Census

=== 2010 census ===
As of the census of 2010, there were 222 people, 81 households, and 61 families living in the town. The population density was 1,585.7 inhabitants per square mile (612.2/km^{2}). There were 97 housing units at an average density of 692.9 per square mile (267.5/km^{2}). The racial makeup of the town was 99.5% White and 0.5% from other races. Hispanic or Latino of any race were 0.5% of the population.

There were 81 households, of which 32.1% had children under the age of 18 living with them, 55.6% were married couples living together, 18.5% had a female householder with no husband present, 1.2% had a male householder with no wife present, and 24.7% were non-families. 22.2% of all households were made up of individuals, and 9.9% had someone living alone who was 65 years of age or older. The average household size was 2.74 and the average family size was 3.20.

The median age in the town was 40 years. 22.1% of residents were under the age of 18; 12.7% were between the ages of 18 and 24; 25.3% were from 25 to 44; 25.3% were from 45 to 64; and 14.9% were 65 years of age or older. The gender makeup of the town was 43.7% male and 56.3% female.

=== 2000 census ===
As of the census of 2000, there were 263 people, 94 households, and 73 families living in the town. The population density was 1,882.2 inhabitants per square mile (726.7/km^{2}). There were 103 housing units at an average density of 737.1 per square mile (284.6/km^{2}). The racial makeup of the town was 99.62% White, and 0.38% from other races. Hispanic or Latino of any race were 0.38% of the population.

There were 94 households, out of which 38.3% had children under the age of 18 living with them, 67.0% were married couples living together, 6.4% had a female householder with no husband present, and 22.3% were non-families. 21.3% of all households were made up of individuals, and 12.8% had someone living alone who was 65 years of age or older. The average household size was 2.80 and the average family size was 3.30.

In the town, the population was spread out, with 27.4% under the age of 18, 9.1% from 18 to 24, 28.9% from 25 to 44, 20.2% from 45 to 64, and 14.4% who were 65 years of age or older. The median age was 34 years. For every 100 females, there were 83.9 males. For every 100 females age 18 and over, there were 91.0 males.

The median income for a household in the town was $31,944, and the median income for a family was $33,906. Males had a median income of $27,500 versus $16,250 for females. The per capita income for the town was $13,693. About 11.1% of families and 15.3% of the population were below the poverty line, including 26.6% of those under the age of eighteen and 5.3% of those 65 or over.
