= Lincoln Senior High School (Cambridge City, Indiana) =

Cambridge City Lincoln High School

Location
- 205 East Parkway Drive; Cambridge City, Indiana 47327; United States
- 39°48′55″N 85°9′57″W

Information
- Type: Public high school
- School district: Western Wayne Schools
- Superintendent: George Philhower
- Principal: Renée Lakes
- Teaching staff: 31.50
- Grades: 7-12
- Enrollment: 340 (2023-2024)
- Student to teacher ratio: 10.79
- Color
- Athletics conference: Tri-Eastern Conference
- Nickname: Golden Eagles
- Website: lmhs.wwayne.k12.in.us

Cambridge City Lincoln High School is a 7-12 public high school located near Cambridge City, Indiana. The mascot is the Golden Eagles, and the school competes in the Tri-Eastern Conference.

== Notable alumni ==
- Theodore Rappaport - electrical engineer

== See also ==
- List of high schools in Indiana
