= Charlottesville, Indiana =

- Unincorporated community and Census-designated place
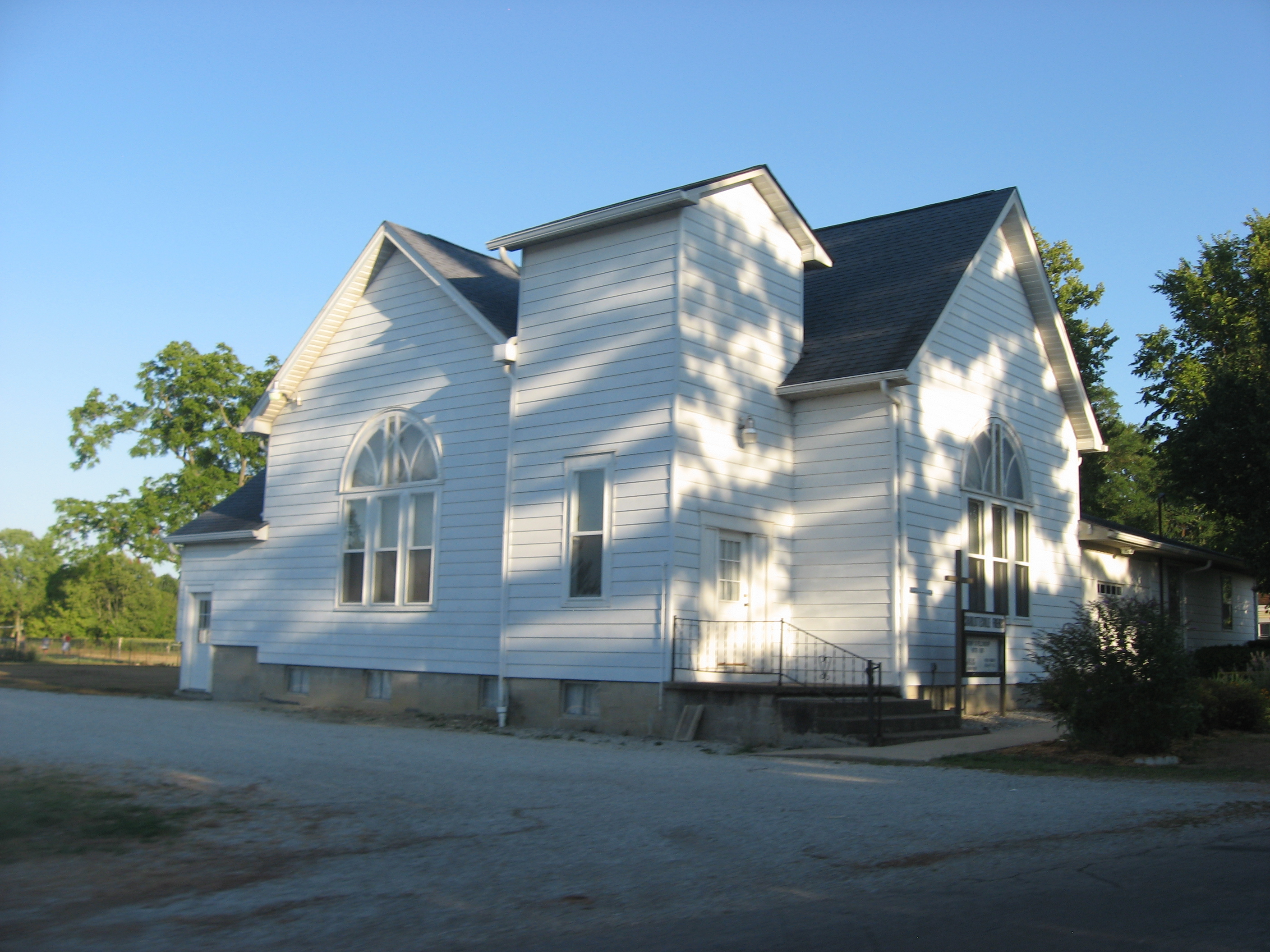
- Charlottesville Friends Church

- Location within Indiana Location within the United States
- Coordinates: 39°47′28″N 85°36′43″W
- Country: United States
- State: Indiana
- Counties: Hancock, Rush
- Townships: Jackson (H), Ripley (R)
- Elevation: 948 ft (289 m)

Population (2012)
  - Total: 631
- Time zone: UTC-5 (Eastern (EST))
  - Summer (DST): UTC-4 (EDT)
- ZIP code: 46117
- Area code: 765
- FIPS code: 18-12196
- GNIS feature ID: 2830398

Charlottesville is an unincorporated community in Hancock and Rush counties in the U.S. state of Indiana. The Hancock County portion is in Jackson Township, while the Rush County portion is in Ripley Township.

== History ==
Charlottesville was laid out and platted in 1830. The community's name most likely was a transfer from Charlottesville, Virginia. It was for a time incorporated as a town, from 1867.

The Charlottesville post office has been in operation since 1831.

== Demographics ==
The United States Census Bureau delineated Charlottesville as a census designated place in the 2022 American Community Survey.

== Transportation ==
=== Major Roads ===
- U.S. Route 40
- I-70

== Education ==
Eastern Hancock Community School Corporation services the towns of Charlottesville, Wilkinson, Shirley, Warrington, and surrounding areas in eastern Hancock County. It consists of one elementary school (Grades K - 5), one middle school (Grades 6 - 8), and one high school (Grades 9 - 12).
