= List of United States cities by population =

Ranking of cities in the U.S.

This is a list of the most populous municipal corporations of the United States. As defined by the United States Census Bureau, an incorporated place includes cities, towns, villages, boroughs, and municipalities. (Note: Towns in New England, while incorporated on a level similar to cities in other states, are considered minor civil divisions by the Census Bureau and are not included in its list of incorporated places. A detailed discussion on this subject can be found at New England town § Census treatment of the New England town system.) A few exceptional census-designated places (CDPs) are also included in the Census Bureau's listing of incorporated places. (Note: The State of Hawaiʻi has no incorporated municipalities other than the City and County of Honolulu, which comprises the entire Island of Oʻahu. In accordance with Hawaiian law, the United States Census Bureau defines the state's cities and towns as Census Designated Places (CDPs). The Census Bureau defines the Urban Honolulu CDP as the portion of the City and County of Honolulu that is coextensive with the Judicial District of Honolulu. The Urban Honolulu CDP is what is generally thought of as the "city" of Honolulu, and its population is used here and in other population comparisons. The Urban Honolulu CDP is currently the most populous Census Designated Place in the United States. The Honolulu, HI Metropolitan Statistical Area comprises the entire City and County of Honolulu.) Consolidated city-counties represent a distinct type of government that includes the entire population of a county, or county equivalent. Some consolidated city-counties, however, include multiple incorporated places. This list presents only the portion of such consolidated city-counties that are not a part of another incorporated place.

This list refers only to the population of individual municipalities within their defined limits; the populations of other municipalities considered suburbs of a central city are listed separately, and unincorporated areas within urban agglomerations are not included. Therefore, a different ranking is evident when considering U.S. urban areas or metropolitan areas.

== 50 states and the District of Columbia ==
Location of the 20 largest cities in the United States, based on U.S. Census Bureau estimates for July 1, 2025

This table lists the 348 incorporated places in the United States, excluding the U.S. territories, with a population of at least 100,000 as of July 1, 2025, as estimated by the U.S. Census Bureau. Five states have no cities with populations exceeding 100,000: Delaware, Maine, Vermont, West Virginia, and Wyoming.

The table displays:

1. The municipality rank by population as of July 1, 2025, as estimated by the United States Census Bureau
2. The municipality name
3. The name of the state in which the municipality lies
4. The municipality population as of July 1, 2025, as estimated by the United States Census Bureau
5. The municipality population as of April 1, 2020, as enumerated by the 2020 United States census
6. The municipality percent population change from April 1, 2020, to July 1, 2025
7. The municipality land area as of January 1, 2020
8. The municipality population density as of April 1, 2020 (residents per unit of land area)
9. The municipality latitude and longitude coordinates

State capital
State's largest municipality
State capital and largest municipality
Federal capital

Municipality	ST	2025 estimate	2020 census	Change	2020 land area		2020 density		Location
Municipality	ST	2025 estimate	2020 census	Change	mi^{2}	km^{2}	/ mi^{2}	/ km^{2}	Location
New York (Note: Since 1898, the City of New York, New York, has comprised five boroughs with consolidated borough–county governments (2025 population estimates): The Borough of Brooklyn and Kings County; (pop. 2,653,963): The Borough of Queens and Queens County; (pop. 2,358,182): The Borough of Manhattan and New York County; (pop. 1,664,862): The Borough of the Bronx and Bronx County; (pop. 1,406,332): The Borough of Staten Island and Richmond County; (pop. 501,290))	NY	8,584,629	8,804,190	−2.49%	300.5	778.3	29,298	11,312	40°40′N 73°56′W
Los Angeles	CA	3,869,089	3,898,747	−0.76%	469.5	1,216.0	8,304	3,206	34°01′N 118°25′W
Chicago	IL	2,731,585	2,746,388	−0.54%	227.7	589.7	12,061	4,657	41°50′N 87°41′W
Houston	TX	2,397,315	2,304,580	+4.02%	640.4	1,658.6	3,599	1,390	29°47′N 95°23′W
Phoenix	AZ	1,665,481	1,608,139	+3.57%	518.0	1,341.6	3,105	1,199	33°34′N 112°05′W
Philadelphia (Note: The City of Philadelphia, Pennsylvania, and Philadelphia County, Pennsylvania, are separate but coterminous entities with a single consolidated city–county government.)	PA	1,574,281	1,603,797	−1.84%	134.4	348.1	11,933	4,607	40°01′N 75°08′W
San Antonio	TX	1,548,422	1,434,625	+7.93%	498.8	1,291.9	2,876	1,110	29°28′N 98°31′W
San Diego	CA	1,406,106	1,386,932	+1.38%	325.9	844.1	4,256	1,643	32°49′N 117°08′W
Dallas	TX	1,329,491	1,304,379	+1.93%	339.6	879.6	3,841	1,483	32°47′N 96°46′W
Fort Worth	TX	1,028,117	918,915	+11.88%	347.3	899.5	2,646	1,022	32°47′N 97°21′W
Jacksonville (Note: The City of Jacksonville, Florida, and Duval County, Florida, are separate entities with a single consolidated city–county government. The City of Jacksonville comprises all of Duval County except the other incorporated municipalities within the county.)	FL	1,017,689	949,611	+7.17%	747.3	1,935.5	1,271	491	30°20′N 81°40′W
Austin	TX	1,002,632	961,855	+4.24%	319.9	828.5	3,007	1,161	30°18′N 97°45′W
San Jose	CA	989,814	1,013,240	−2.31%	178.3	461.8	5,683	2,194	37°18′N 121°49′W
Charlotte	NC	964,784	874,579	+10.31%	308.3	798.5	2,837	1,095	35°13′N 80°50′W
Columbus	OH	938,396	905,748	+3.60%	220.0	569.8	4,117	1,590	39°59′N 82°59′W
Indianapolis (Note: The City of Indianapolis, Indiana, and Marion County, Indiana, are separate entities with a single consolidated city–county government. The City of Indianapolis comprises all of Marion County except the other incorporated municipalities within the county. See Indianapolis (balance).)	IN	901,116	887,642	+1.52%	361.6	936.5	2,455	948	39°47′N 86°09′W
San Francisco (Note: The City and County of San Francisco, California, has a consolidated city and county government.)	CA	826,079	873,965	−5.48%	46.9	121.5	18,635	7,195	37°44′N 123°02′W
Seattle	WA	784,777	737,015	+6.48%	83.8	217.0	8,795	3,396	47°37′N 122°21′W
Denver (Note: The City and County of Denver, Colorado, has a consolidated city and county government.)	CO	740,613	715,522	+3.51%	153.1	396.5	4,674	1,805	39°46′N 104°53′W
Nashville (Note: The City of Nashville, Tennessee, and Davidson County, Tennessee, are separate entities with a single consolidated city–county government. The City of Nashville comprises all of Davidson County except the other incorporated municipalities within the county. See Nashville-Davidson (balance).)	TN	721,074	689,447	+4.59%	475.8	1,232.3	1,449	559	36°10′N 86°47′W
Oklahoma City	OK	719,849	681,054	+5.70%	606.2	1,570.1	1,123	434	35°28′N 97°31′W
Washington (Note: The City of Washington was consolidated with the District of Columbia in 1871.)	DC	693,645	689,545	+0.59%	61.1	158.2	11,286	4,358	38°54′N 77°01′W
El Paso	TX	683,012	678,815	+0.62%	258.4	669.3	2,627	1,014	31°51′N 106°26′W
Las Vegas	NV	679,817	641,903	+5.91%	141.8	367.3	4,527	1,748	36°14′N 115°16′W
Boston	MA	672,973	675,647	−0.40%	48.3	125.1	13,989	5,401	42°20′N 71°01′W
Detroit	MI	649,095	639,111	+1.56%	138.7	359.2	4,608	1,779	42°23′N 83°06′W
Louisville (Note: The City of Louisville, Kentucky, and Jefferson County, Kentucky, are separate entities with a single consolidated city–county government. The City of Louisville comprises all of Jefferson County except the other incorporated municipalities within the county. See Louisville/Jefferson County metro government (balance).)	KY	641,962	633,045	+1.41%	324.9	841.5	1,948	752	38°10′N 85°39′W
Portland	OR	635,109	652,503	−2.67%	133.5	345.8	4,888	1,887	45°32′N 122°39′W
Memphis	TN	609,647	633,104	−3.71%	297.0	769.2	2,132	823	35°07′N 89°58′W
Baltimore	MD	569,997	585,708	−2.68%	80.9	209.5	7,240	2,800	39°18′N 76°37′W
Milwaukee	WI	562,407	577,222	−2.57%	96.2	249.2	6,000	2,300	43°04′N 87°58′W
Albuquerque	NM	556,588	564,559	−1.41%	187.3	485.1	3,014	1,164	35°06′N 106°39′W
Fresno	CA	555,549	542,107	+2.48%	115.2	298.4	4,706	1,817	36°47′N 119°47′W
Tucson	AZ	548,371	542,629	+1.06%	241.0	624.2	2,252	870	32°09′N 110°52′W
Sacramento	CA	536,449	524,943	+2.19%	98.6	255.4	5,324	2,056	38°34′N 121°28′W
Atlanta	GA	529,110	498,715	+6.09%	135.3	350.4	3,686	1,423	33°46′N 84°25′W
Kansas City	MO	521,220	508,090	+2.58%	314.7	815.1	1,615	624	39°07′N 94°34′W
Mesa	AZ	513,656	504,258	+1.86%	138.7	359.2	3,636	1,404	33°24′N 111°43′W
Raleigh	NC	506,306	467,665	+8.26%	147.1	381.0	3,179	1,227	35°50′N 78°38′W
Colorado Springs	CO	494,743	478,961	+3.30%	195.4	506.1	2,451	946	38°52′N 104°46′W
Miami	FL	489,812	442,241	+10.76%	36.0	93.2	12,284	4,743	25°47′N 80°13′W
Omaha	NE	488,797	486,051	+0.56%	141.6	366.7	3,433	1,325	41°16′N 96°03′W
Virginia Beach	VA	453,737	459,470	−1.25%	244.7	633.8	1,878	725	36°47′N 76°02′W
Long Beach	CA	450,469	466,742	−3.49%	50.7	131.3	9,206	3,554	33°47′N 118°10′W
Oakland	CA	440,838	440,646	+0.04%	55.9	144.8	7,883	3,044	37°46′N 122°14′W
Minneapolis	MN	430,324	429,954	+0.09%	54.0	139.9	7,962	3,074	44°58′N 93°16′W
Bakersfield	CA	422,165	403,455	+4.64%	149.8	388.0	2,693	1,040	35°21′N 119°02′W
Tulsa	OK	416,209	413,066	+0.76%	197.5	511.5	2,091	807	36°08′N 95°54′W
Tampa	FL	413,554	384,959	+7.43%	114.0	295.3	3,377	1,304	27°58′N 82°28′W
Aurora	CO	410,053	386,261	+6.16%	160.1	414.7	2,413	932	39°42′N 104°43′W
Arlington	TX	402,134	394,266	+2.00%	95.9	248.4	4,111	1,587	32°42′N 97°07′W
Wichita	KS	400,987	397,532	+0.87%	162.0	419.6	2,454	947	37°41′N 97°21′W
Cleveland	OH	363,608	372,624	−2.42%	77.7	201.2	4,796	1,852	41°29′N 81°41′W
New Orleans (Note: The City of New Orleans, Louisiana, and Orleans Parish, Louisiana, are separate but coterminous entities with a single consolidated city–parish government.)	LA	362,154	383,997	−5.69%	169.5	439.0	2,265	875	30°03′N 89°56′W
Henderson	NV	353,289	317,610	+11.23%	106.2	275.1	2,991	1,155	36°01′N 115°02′W
Honolulu (Note: The urban area of Honolulu, Hawaii, and Honolulu County, Hawaii, are separate statistical entities with a single consolidated city–county government, City and County of Honolulu, over all of the county. The core urban area of Honolulu is referred to as Urban Honolulu CDP by the US Census Bureau, while several other communities are in other unincorporated census-designated places within the county.)	HI	341,868	350,964	−2.59%	60.5	156.7	5,801	2,240	21°19′N 157°51′W
Anaheim	CA	341,008	346,824	−1.68%	50.3	130.3	6,895	2,662	33°52′N 117°46′W
Orlando	FL	333,888	307,573	+8.56%	110.6	286.5	2,781	1,074	28°25′N 81°15′W
Lexington (Note: The City of Lexington, Kentucky, and Fayette County, Kentucky, are separate but coterminous entities with a single consolidated city–county government)	KY	329,751	322,570	+2.23%	283.6	734.5	1,137	439	38°02′N 84°28′W
Stockton	CA	324,597	320,804	+1.18%	62.2	161.1	5,158	1,992	37°59′N 121°19′W
Newark	NJ	323,808	311,549	+3.93%	24.1	62.4	12,927	4,991	40°43′N 74°10′W
Riverside	CA	323,057	314,998	+2.56%	81.2	210.3	3,879	1,498	33°56′N 117°23′W
Irvine	CA	318,764	307,670	+3.61%	65.6	169.9	4,690	1,810	33°41′N 117°46′W
Corpus Christi	TX	317,247	317,863	−0.19%	162.2	420.1	1,960	760	27°45′N 97°10′W
Santa Ana	CA	315,586	310,227	+1.73%	27.3	70.7	11,364	4,388	33°44′N 117°53′W
Cincinnati	OH	314,367	309,317	+1.63%	77.8	201.5	3,976	1,535	39°08′N 84°31′W
Greensboro	NC	308,667	299,035	+3.22%	129.6	335.7	2,307	891	36°06′N 79°50′W
Pittsburgh	PA	307,632	302,971	+1.54%	55.4	143.5	5,469	2,112	40°26′N 79°59′W
St. Paul (Note: Official name is Saint Paul, with the "Saint" spelled out.)	MN	306,684	311,527	−1.55%	52.0	134.7	5,991	2,313	44°57′N 93°06′W
Durham	NC	305,561	283,506	+7.78%	112.8	292.2	2,513	970	35°59′N 78°54′W
Jersey City	NJ	302,013	292,449	+3.27%	14.7	38.1	19,894	7,681	40°43′N 74°04′W
Lincoln	NE	301,522	291,082	+3.59%	97.7	253.0	2,979	1,150	40°49′N 96°41′W
North Las Vegas	NV	296,653	262,527	+13.00%	101.3	262.4	2,592	1,001	36°17′N 115°05′W
Plano	TX	293,028	285,494	+2.64%	71.7	185.7	3,982	1,537	33°03′N 96°45′W
Gilbert	AZ	287,285	267,918	+7.23%	68.6	177.7	3,906	1,508	33°19′N 111°44′W
Anchorage (Note: The Municipality of Anchorage, Alaska, is a unified home rule municipality that functions as both a city and a borough.)	AK	287,155	291,247	−1.40%	1,706.8	4,420.6	171	66	61°10′N 149°17′W
Madison	WI	286,233	269,840	+6.08%	79.6	206.2	3,390	1,310	43°05′N 89°26′W
Reno	NV	283,621	264,165	+7.37%	108.8	281.8	2,428	937	39°33′N 119°51′W
Chandler	AZ	278,748	275,987	+1.00%	65.3	169.1	4,226	1,632	33°17′N 111°51′W
St. Louis	MO	278,144	301,578	−7.77%	61.7	159.8	4,888	1,887	38°38′N 90°14′W
Chula Vista	CA	275,533	275,487	+0.02%	49.6	128.5	5,554	2,144	32°38′N 117°01′W
Fort Wayne	IN	275,203	263,886	+4.29%	110.7	286.7	2,384	920	41°05′N 85°08′W
Buffalo	NY	274,613	278,349	−1.34%	40.4	104.6	6,890	2,660	42°53′N 78°52′W
Lubbock	TX	273,071	257,141	+6.20%	134.6	348.6	1,910	740	33°34′N 101°53′W
Laredo	TX	269,515	255,205	+5.61%	106.5	275.8	2,396	925	27°34′N 99°29′W
Port St. Lucie	FL	268,062	204,851	+30.86%	119.2	308.7	1,719	664	27°17′N 80°23′W
St. Petersburg	FL	264,033	258,308	+2.22%	61.8	160.1	4,180	1,610	27°46′N 82°38′W
Toledo	OH	263,423	270,871	−2.75%	80.5	208.5	3,365	1,299	41°40′N 83°35′W
Glendale	AZ	260,572	248,325	+4.93%	61.6	159.5	4,031	1,556	33°32′N 112°11′W
Winston-Salem	NC	257,271	249,545	+3.10%	132.7	343.7	1,881	726	36°06′N 80°16′W
Irving	TX	257,076	256,684	+0.15%	67.0	173.5	3,831	1,479	32°52′N 96°58′W
Chesapeake	VA	255,332	249,422	+2.37%	338.5	876.7	737	285	36°41′N 76°18′W
Garland	TX	249,625	246,018	+1.47%	57.1	147.9	4,309	1,664	32°55′N 96°38′W
Scottsdale	AZ	243,006	241,361	+0.68%	184.0	476.6	1,312	507	33°41′N 111°52′W
Boise (Note: Officially listed in US Census Bureau records as Boise City)	ID	238,429	235,684	+1.16%	84.0	217.6	2,806	1,083	43°36′N 116°14′W
Richmond	VA	237,257	226,610	+4.70%	59.9	155.1	3,783	1,461	37°32′N 77°29′W
Frisco	TX	236,955	200,509	+18.18%	68.6	177.7	2,923	1,129	33°10′N 96°49′W
Cape Coral	FL	236,264	194,016	+21.78%	106.0	274.5	1,830	710	26°39′N 81°59′W
McKinney	TX	236,001	195,308	+20.84%	67.0	173.5	2,915	1,125	33°12′N 96°40′W
Huntsville	AL	233,627	215,006	+8.66%	218.1	564.9	986	381	34°47′N 86°32′W
Norfolk	VA	231,013	238,005	−2.94%	53.3	138.0	4,465	1,724	36°55′N 76°14′W
Hialeah	FL	230,968	223,109	+3.52%	21.6	55.9	10,329	3,988	25°52′N 80°18′W
Spokane	WA	230,783	228,989	+0.78%	68.8	178.2	3,328	1,285	47°40′N 117°26′W
Tacoma	WA	229,816	219,346	+4.77%	49.7	128.7	4,413	1,704	47°15′N 122°28′W
Santa Clarita	CA	228,430	228,673	−0.11%	70.8	183.4	3,230	1,250	34°25′N 118°29′W
Fremont	CA	226,442	230,504	−1.76%	78.3	202.8	2,944	1,137	37°29′N 121°56′W
Baton Rouge (Note: The City of Baton Rouge, Louisiana, and East Baton Rouge Parish, Louisiana, are separate entities with a single consolidated city–parish government. The City of Baton Rouge has retained its own city limits within East Baton Rouge Parish.)	LA	222,795	227,470	−2.06%	86.3	223.5	2,636	1,018	30°26′N 91°08′W
San Bernardino	CA	222,044	222,101	−0.03%	62.1	160.8	3,577	1,381	34°08′N 117°17′W
Fontana	CA	221,223	208,393	+6.16%	43.1	111.6	4,835	1,867	34°07′N 117°28′W
Modesto	CA	219,652	218,464	+0.54%	43.0	111.4	5,081	1,962	37°38′N 121°00′W
Salt Lake City	UT	218,428	199,723	+9.37%	110.3	285.7	1,811	699	40°47′N 111°56′W
Moreno Valley	CA	214,263	208,634	+2.70%	51.3	132.9	4,067	1,570	33°55′N 117°13′W
Worcester	MA	213,862	206,518	+3.56%	37.4	96.9	5,522	2,132	42°16′N 71°49′W
Sioux Falls	SD	213,748	192,517	+11.03%	79.1	204.9	2,434	940	43°32′N 96°44′W
Yonkers	NY	212,603	211,569	+0.49%	18.0	46.6	11,754	4,538	40°57′N 73°52′W
Des Moines	IA	212,086	214,133	−0.96%	88.2	228.4	2,428	937	41°34′N 93°37′W
Grand Prairie	TX	209,434	196,100	+6.80%	72.6	188.0	2,701	1,043	32°41′N 97°01′W
Fayetteville	NC	209,120	208,501	+0.30%	148.3	384.1	1,406	543	35°05′N 78°58′W
Little Rock	AR	206,427	202,591	+1.89%	120.0	310.8	1,688	652	34°43′N 92°22′W
Rochester	NY	206,108	211,328	−2.47%	35.8	92.7	5,903	2,279	43°10′N 77°37′W
Amarillo	TX	205,130	200,393	+2.36%	102.3	265.0	1,959	756	35°12′N 101°50′W
Tallahassee	FL	204,902	196,169	+4.45%	100.9	261.3	1,944	751	30°28′N 84°15′W
Overland Park	KS	203,677	197,238	+3.26%	75.2	194.8	2,623	1,013	38°53′N 94°41′W
Columbus (Note: The City of Columbus, Georgia, and Muscogee County, Georgia, are separate but coterminous entities with a single consolidated city–county government.)	GA	202,171	206,922	−2.30%	216.5	560.7	956	369	32°31′N 84°52′W
Knoxville	TN	202,021	190,740	+5.91%	98.7	255.6	1,933	746	35°58′N 83°57′W
Augusta (Note: The City of Augusta, Georgia, and Richmond County, Georgia, are separate entities with a single consolidated city–county government. The City of Augusta comprises all of Richmond County except the two other incorporated municipalities within the county.)	GA	201,999	202,081	−0.04%	302.3	783.0	668	258	33°22′N 82°04′W
Grand Rapids	MI	201,183	198,917	+1.14%	44.8	116.0	4,440	1,710	42°58′N 85°40′W
Peoria	AZ	200,881	190,985	+5.18%	176.1	456.1	1,085	419	33°47′N 112°19′W
Mobile	AL	200,824	187,041	+7.37%	139.5	361.3	1,341	518	30°40′N 88°06′W
Vancouver	WA	199,698	190,915	+4.60%	48.7	126.1	3,920	1,510	45°38′N 122°36′W
Oxnard	CA	199,651	202,063	−1.19%	26.5	68.6	7,625	2,944	34°12′N 119°13′W
Birmingham	AL	195,893	200,733	−2.41%	147.0	380.7	1,366	527	33°32′N 86°48′W
Providence	RI	195,310	190,934	+2.29%	18.4	47.7	10,377	4,007	41°49′N 71°25′W
Montgomery	AL	195,300	200,603	−2.64%	159.9	414.1	1,255	485	32°21′N 86°16′W
Chattanooga	TN	194,144	181,099	+7.20%	142.4	368.8	1,272	491	35°04′N 85°15′W
Brownsville	TX	192,957	186,738	+3.33%	131.5	340.6	1,420	550	26°00′N 97°27′W
Huntington Beach	CA	191,451	198,711	−3.65%	27.0	69.9	7,360	2,840	33°42′N 118°00′W
Tempe	AZ	190,571	180,587	+5.53%	39.9	103.3	4,526	1,747	33°23′N 111°56′W
Akron	OH	189,691	190,469	−0.41%	61.9	160.3	3,077	1,188	41°05′N 81°31′W
Clarksville	TN	188,829	166,722	+13.26%	99.4	257.4	1,677	647	36°34′N 87°21′W
Fort Lauderdale	FL	188,677	182,760	+3.24%	34.6	89.6	5,282	2,039	26°08′N 80°09′W
Glendale	CA	187,160	196,543	−4.77%	30.5	79.0	6,444	2,488	34°11′N 118°15′W
Ontario	CA	187,013	175,265	+6.70%	50.0	129.5	3,505	1,353	34°02′N 117°36′W
Elk Grove	CA	185,007	176,124	+5.04%	42.0	108.8	4,193	1,619	38°25′N 121°23′W
Cary	NC	183,582	174,721	+5.07%	59.2	153.3	2,951	1,139	35°47′N 78°49′W
Newport News	VA	183,230	186,247	−1.62%	69.0	178.7	2,699	1,042	37°05′N 76°31′W
Salem	OR	181,779	175,535	+3.56%	48.8	126.4	3,597	1,389	44°55′N 123°01′W
Aurora	IL	181,505	180,542	+0.53%	45.0	116.5	4,012	1,549	41°46′N 88°17′W
Santa Rosa	CA	179,437	178,127	+0.74%	42.5	110.1	4,191	1,618	38°27′N 122°43′W
Eugene	OR	178,618	176,654	+1.11%	44.2	114.5	3,997	1,543	44°04′N 123°07′W
Rancho Cucamonga	CA	177,856	174,453	+1.95%	40.1	103.9	4,350	1,680	34°07′N 117°34′W
Pembroke Pines	FL	176,714	171,178	+3.23%	32.7	84.7	5,235	2,021	26°01′N 80°20′W
Shreveport	LA	175,902	187,593	−6.23%	107.8	279.2	1,740	670	32°28′N 93°47′W
Surprise	AZ	175,304	143,148	+22.46%	110.3	285.7	1,298	501	33°40′N 112°27′W
Fort Collins	CO	171,500	169,810	+1.00%	57.2	148.1	2,969	1,146	40°33′N 105°04′W
Murfreesboro	TN	171,178	152,769	+12.05%	62.9	162.9	2,429	938	35°51′N 86°25′W
Oceanside	CA	170,483	174,068	−2.06%	41.3	107.0	4,215	1,627	33°13′N 117°19′W
Garden Grove	CA	170,455	171,949	−0.87%	18.0	46.6	9,553	3,688	33°47′N 117°58′W
Lancaster	CA	170,084	173,516	−1.98%	94.3	244.2	1,840	710	34°41′N 118°11′W
Springfield	MO	169,847	169,176	+0.40%	82.4	213.4	2,053	793	37°11′N 93°17′W
Denton	TX	169,431	139,869	+21.14%	96.4	249.7	1,451	560	33°13′N 97°08′W
Roseville	CA	167,302	147,773	+13.22%	44.1	114.2	3,351	1,294	38°46′N 121°19′W
Killeen	TX	161,883	153,095	+5.74%	54.8	141.9	2,794	1,079	31°05′N 97°44′W
Palmdale	CA	161,845	169,450	−4.49%	106.1	274.8	1,597	617	34°35′N 118°07′W
Paterson	NJ	161,793	159,732	+1.29%	8.4	21.8	19,016	7,342	40°55′N 74°10′W
Corona	CA	161,734	157,136	+2.93%	39.9	103.3	3,938	1,520	33°52′N 117°34′W
Alexandria	VA	160,662	159,467	+0.75%	14.9	38.6	10,702	4,132	38°49′N 77°05′W
Charleston	SC	159,423	150,227	+6.12%	114.8	297.3	1,309	505	32°50′N 79°58′W
Salinas	CA	159,134	163,542	−2.70%	23.5	60.9	6,959	2,687	36°41′N 121°38′W
Kansas City (Note: Kansas City, Kansas, and Wyandotte County, Kansas, are separate entities with a single consolidated city–county government. Kansas City comprises all of Wyandotte County except the other incorporated municipalities within the county.)	KS	157,805	156,607	+0.76%	124.7	323.0	1,256	485	39°07′N 94°44′W
Macon (Note: After approval by local voters in a 2012 referendum, the City of Macon, Georgia merged with most of unincorporated Bibb County, Georgia on January 1, 2014. The new consolidated government is officially "Macon-Bibb County".)	GA	157,556	157,346	+0.13%	249.4	645.9	631	244	32°49′N 83°41′W
Hayward	CA	157,113	162,954	−3.58%	45.8	118.6	3,558	1,374	37°38′N 122°06′W
Hollywood	FL	157,019	153,067	+2.58%	27.3	70.7	5,607	2,165	26°02′N 80°10′W
Lakewood	CO	156,927	155,984	+0.60%	43.5	112.7	3,586	1,385	39°42′N 105°07′W
Sunnyvale	CA	156,577	155,805	+0.50%	22.1	57.2	7,050	2,720	37°23′N 122°02′W
Springfield	MA	154,702	155,929	−0.79%	31.9	82.6	4,888	1,887	42°07′N 72°32′W
Bellevue	WA	154,193	151,854	+1.54%	33.5	86.8	4,533	1,750	47°36′N 122°10′W
Naperville	IL	153,114	149,540	+2.39%	39.1	101.3	3,825	1,477	41°45′N 88°10′W
Bridgeport	CT	152,273	148,654	+2.43%	16.1	41.7	9,233	3,565	41°11′N 73°12′W
Joliet	IL	152,241	150,362	+1.25%	64.5	167.1	2,331	900	41°31′N 88°09′W
Mesquite	TX	150,693	150,108	+0.39%	48.5	125.6	3,095	1,195	32°46′N 96°35′W
McAllen	TX	150,640	142,210	+5.93%	62.3	161.4	2,283	881	26°13′N 98°15′W
Olathe	KS	150,025	141,290	+6.18%	61.9	160.3	2,283	881	38°53′N 94°49′W
Savannah	GA	149,440	147,780	+1.12%	106.8	276.6	1,384	534	32°00′N 81°09′W
Gainesville	FL	148,671	141,085	+5.38%	63.2	163.7	2,232	862	29°41′N 82°21′W
Pasadena	TX	148,539	151,950	−2.24%	43.7	113.2	3,477	1,342	29°39′N 95°09′W
Palm Bay	FL	148,092	119,760	+23.66%	86.4	223.8	1,386	535	27°58′N 80°40′W
Pomona	CA	147,807	151,713	−2.57%	23.0	59.6	6,596	2,547	34°04′N 117°46′W
Waco	TX	147,788	138,486	+6.72%	88.7	229.7	1,561	603	31°34′N 97°11′W
Thornton	CO	147,766	141,867	+4.16%	35.9	93.0	3,952	1,526	39°55′N 104°56′W
Midland	TX	147,615	132,524	+11.39%	75.5	195.5	1,755	678	32°01′N 102°07′W
Rockford	IL	147,384	148,655	−0.85%	64.5	167.1	2,305	890	42°16′N 89°04′W
Columbia	SC	147,035	136,632	+7.61%	136.8	354.3	999	386	34°02′N 80°55′W
Visalia	CA	146,541	141,384	+3.65%	37.9	98.2	3,730	1,440	36°20′N 119°20′W
Escondido	CA	146,030	151,038	−3.32%	37.3	96.6	4,049	1,563	33°08′N 117°04′W
Syracuse	NY	144,896	148,620	−2.51%	25.1	65.0	5,921	2,286	43°02′N 76°08′W
Lakewood (Note: Incorporated as a township. In New Jersey, townships are considered full-fledged municipalities on par with any town, city, borough, or village.)	NJ	143,765	135,158	+6.37%	24.7	64.0	5,472	2,113	40°05′N 74°12′W
Meridian	ID	142,988	117,635	+21.55%	35.1	90.9	3,351	1,294	43°37′N 116°24′W
Miramar	FL	142,570	134,721	+5.83%	28.9	74.9	4,662	1,800	25°58′N 80°20′W
Elizabeth	NJ	141,675	137,298	+3.19%	12.3	31.9	11,162	4,310	40°40′N 74°11′W
Victorville	CA	141,395	134,810	+4.88%	73.7	190.9	1,829	706	34°32′N 117°21′W
Round Rock	TX	141,282	119,468	+18.26%	37.6	97.4	3,177	1,227	30°32′N 97°40′W
Jackson	MS	141,196	153,701	−8.14%	111.7	289.3	1,376	531	32°19′N 90°13′W
Stamford	CT	139,535	135,470	+3.00%	37.6	97.4	3,603	1,391	41°05′N 73°33′W
Lewisville	TX	139,006	111,822	+24.31%	37.0	95.8	3,022	1,167	33°03′N 96°59′W
Coral Springs	FL	138,783	134,394	+3.27%	22.9	59.3	5,869	2,266	26°16′N 80°16′W
New Haven	CT	138,774	134,023	+3.54%	18.7	48.4	7,167	2,767	41°19′N 72°55′W
Fullerton	CA	138,675	143,617	−3.44%	22.4	58.0	6,411	2,475	33°53′N 117°56′W
Torrance	CA	138,391	147,067	−5.90%	20.5	53.1	7,174	2,770	33°50′N 118°22′W
Orange	CA	138,365	139,911	−1.10%	25.7	66.6	5,444	2,102	33°47′N 117°52′W
Cedar Rapids	IA	137,935	137,710	+0.16%	72.1	186.7	1,910	740	41°58′N 91°41′W
West Valley City	UT	137,491	140,230	−1.95%	35.8	92.7	3,917	1,512	40°41′N 112°01′W
Hampton	VA	137,315	137,148	+0.12%	51.5	133.4	2,663	1,028	37°03′N 76°18′W
Warren	MI	137,138	139,387	−1.61%	34.4	89.1	4,052	1,564	42°29′N 83°02′W
Dayton	OH	136,688	137,644	−0.69%	55.8	144.5	2,467	953	39°47′N 84°12′W
Fargo	ND	136,275	125,990	+8.16%	49.8	129.0	2,530	980	46°52′N 96°50′W
Pasadena	CA	135,804	138,699	−2.09%	23.0	59.6	6,030	2,330	34°10′N 118°08′W
Kent	WA	134,871	136,588	−1.26%	33.8	87.5	4,041	1,560	47°23′N 122°13′W
Carrollton	TX	134,562	133,434	+0.85%	36.7	95.1	3,636	1,404	32°59′N 96°54′W
Sterling Heights	MI	133,931	134,346	−0.31%	36.4	94.3	3,691	1,425	42°35′N 83°02′W
Santa Clara	CA	133,446	127,647	+4.54%	18.3	47.4	6,975	2,693	37°22′N 121°58′W
Abilene	TX	131,588	125,182	+5.12%	106.7	276.4	1,173	453	32°27′N 99°44′W
Norman	OK	130,943	128,026	+2.28%	178.8	463.1	716	276	35°14′N 97°21′W
Columbia	MO	130,851	126,254	+3.64%	66.5	172.2	1,899	733	38°57′N 92°20′W
Pearland	TX	129,930	125,828	+3.26%	48.7	126.1	2,584	998	29°34′N 95°19′W
Clovis	CA	129,347	120,124	+7.68%	25.4	65.8	4,729	1,826	36°50′N 119°41′W
North Charleston	SC	129,245	114,852	+12.53%	77.6	201.0	1,480	570	32°55′N 80°04′W
Athens (Note: The City of Athens, Georgia, and Clarke County, Georgia, are separate entities with a single consolidated city–county government. The City of Athens comprises all of Clarke County except the other incorporated municipalities within the county.)	GA	128,612	127,315	+1.02%	116.3	301.2	1,095	423	33°57′N 83°22′W
College Station	TX	127,472	120,511	+5.78%	51.2	132.6	2,354	909	30°35′N 96°18′W
West Palm Beach	FL	127,189	117,415	+8.32%	53.8	139.3	2,182	842	26°45′N 80°08′W
Wilmington	NC	126,809	115,451	+9.84%	51.4	133.1	2,246	867	34°13′N 77°53′W
Allentown	PA	126,044	125,845	+0.16%	17.6	45.6	7,150	2,760	40°35′N 75°29′W
Topeka	KS	125,795	126,587	−0.63%	61.4	159.0	2,062	796	39°02′N 95°41′W
Lakeland	FL	125,520	112,641	+11.43%	66.2	171.5	1,702	657	28°04′N 81°57′W
Buckeye	AZ	125,445	91,502	+37.10%	393.0	1,017.9	233	90	33°26′N 112°38′W
Goodyear	AZ	125,359	95,294	+31.55%	191.3	495.5	498	192	33°15′N 112°22′W
Broken Arrow	OK	124,991	113,540	+10.09%	63.0	163.2	1,802	696	36°02′N 95°47′W
Simi Valley	CA	124,861	126,356	−1.18%	41.5	107.5	3,045	1,176	34°16′N 118°45′W
Rochester	MN	124,292	121,395	+2.39%	55.5	143.7	2,187	844	44°01′N 92°29′W
Lafayette (Note: The City of Lafayette, Louisiana, and Lafayette Parish, Louisiana, are separate entities with a single consolidated city–parish government. The City of Lafayette has retained its own city limits within Lafayette Parish.)	LA	123,311	121,374	+1.60%	55.8	144.5	2,175	840	30°13′N 92°02′W
Vallejo	CA	123,287	126,090	−2.22%	30.4	78.7	4,148	1,602	38°07′N 122°16′W
Concord	CA	123,261	125,410	−1.71%	30.6	79.3	4,098	1,582	37°58′N 122°00′W
Arvada	CO	122,901	124,402	−1.21%	38.9	100.8	3,198	1,235	39°50′N 105°09′W
Odessa	TX	122,707	114,428	+7.24%	51.1	132.3	2,239	864	31°53′N 102°21′W
Cambridge	MA	122,588	118,403	+3.53%	6.4	16.6	18,500	7,100	42°23′N 71°07′W
New Braunfels	TX	122,492	90,403	+35.50%	45.2	117.1	2,000	770	29°42′N 98°07′W
Fairfield	CA	122,489	119,881	+2.18%	41.6	107.7	2,882	1,113	38°16′N 122°02′W
Ann Arbor	MI	122,233	123,851	−1.31%	28.2	73.0	4,392	1,696	42°17′N 83°44′W
Thousand Oaks	CA	122,230	126,966	−3.73%	55.3	143.2	2,296	886	34°11′N 118°52′W
Hartford	CT	121,981	121,054	+0.77%	17.4	45.1	6,957	2,686	41°46′N 72°41′W
Berkeley	CA	121,911	124,321	−1.94%	10.4	26.9	11,954	4,615	37°52′N 122°18′W
Independence	MO	121,675	123,011	−1.09%	78.0	202.0	1,577	609	39°05′N 94°21′W
Billings	MT	121,239	117,116	+3.52%	44.8	116.0	2,614	1,009	45°47′N 108°33′W
High Point	NC	120,571	114,059	+5.71%	56.4	146.1	2,022	781	35°59′N 79°59′W
Nampa	ID	120,384	100,200	+20.14%	33.5	86.8	2,991	1,155	43°35′N 116°34′W
Lowell	MA	119,971	115,554	+3.82%	13.6	35.2	8,497	3,281	42°38′N 71°19′W
League City	TX	119,905	114,392	+4.82%	51.3	132.9	2,230	860	29°29′N 95°07′W
Conroe	TX	119,564	89,956	+32.91%	72.0	186.5	1,249	482	30°19′N 95°29′W
Antioch	CA	118,958	115,291	+3.18%	29.2	75.6	3,948	1,524	37°59′N 121°48′W
Menifee	CA	118,592	102,527	+15.67%	46.5	120.4	2,205	851	33°41′N 117°11′W
Richardson	TX	118,542	119,469	−0.78%	28.6	74.1	4,177	1,613	32°58′N 96°43′W
Pompano Beach	FL	117,211	112,046	+4.61%	24.0	62.2	4,669	1,803	26°14′N 80°08′W
Las Cruces	NM	116,978	111,385	+5.02%	76.9	199.2	1,448	559	32°20′N 106°47′W
Manchester	NH	116,818	115,644	+1.02%	33.1	85.7	3,494	1,349	42°59′N 71°26′W
West Jordan	UT	116,812	116,961	−0.13%	32.3	83.7	3,621	1,398	40°36′N 112°00′W
Westminster	CO	116,182	116,317	−0.12%	31.6	81.8	3,681	1,421	39°53′N 105°04′W
Evansville	IN	116,176	117,298	−0.96%	47.4	122.8	2,475	956	37°59′N 87°32′W
Waterbury	CT	115,771	114,403	+1.20%	28.5	73.8	4,014	1,550	41°34′N 73°02′W
Elgin	IL	115,476	114,797	+0.59%	38.0	98.4	3,021	1,166	42°02′N 88°20′W
Greeley	CO	115,073	108,795	+5.77%	48.9	126.7	2,225	859	40°25′N 104°46′W
Temecula	CA	114,865	110,003	+4.42%	37.3	96.6	2,949	1,139	33°29′N 117°08′W
Richmond	CA	114,861	116,448	−1.36%	30.1	78.0	3,869	1,494	37°57′N 122°22′W
Concord	NC	114,598	105,240	+8.89%	63.5	164.5	1,657	640	35°23′N 80°38′W
Provo	UT	114,527	115,162	−0.55%	41.7	108.0	2,762	1,066	40°15′N 111°39′W
Rio Rancho	NM	114,419	104,046	+9.97%	103.4	267.8	1,006	388	35°17′N 106°42′W
Clearwater	FL	114,364	117,292	−2.50%	26.1	67.6	4,494	1,735	27°59′N 82°46′W
Tuscaloosa	AL	114,316	99,600	+14.78%	61.9	160.3	1,609	621	33°14′N 87°32′W
Murrieta	CA	114,124	110,949	+2.86%	33.6	87.0	3,302	1,275	33°34′N 117°11′W
Lansing	MI	113,884	112,644	+1.10%	39.1	101.3	2,881	1,112	42°43′N 84°34′W
Tyler	TX	113,723	105,995	+7.29%	57.5	148.9	1,843	712	32°19′N 95°19′W
Miami Gardens	FL	113,579	111,640	+1.74%	18.2	47.1	6,134	2,368	25°57′N 80°14′W
Everett	WA	113,567	110,629	+2.66%	33.2	86.0	3,332	1,286	47°57′N 122°11′W
Allen	TX	113,447	104,627	+8.43%	26.4	68.4	3,963	1,530	33°07′N 96°40′W
Springfield	IL	112,989	114,394	−1.23%	61.1	158.2	1,872	723	39°47′N 89°38′W
Beaumont	TX	112,967	115,282	−2.01%	82.5	213.7	1,397	539	30°05′N 94°09′W
South Fulton	GA	112,820	107,436	+5.01%	85.2	220.7	1,261	487	33°40′N 84°34′W
Carlsbad	CA	112,260	114,746	−2.17%	37.8	97.9	3,036	1,172	33°08′N 117°17′W
Sparks	NV	111,902	108,445	+3.19%	36.4	94.3	2,979	1,150	39°34′N 119°43′W
Gresham	OR	111,513	114,247	−2.39%	23.5	60.9	4,862	1,877	45°30′N 122°26′W
Santa Maria	CA	111,390	109,707	+1.53%	22.8	59.1	4,812	1,858	34°56′N 120°26′W
Hillsboro	OR	111,126	106,447	+4.40%	25.7	66.6	4,142	1,599	45°32′N 122°56′W
Peoria	IL	110,920	113,150	−1.97%	48.0	124.3	2,357	910	40°45′N 89°37′W
Davie	FL	110,851	105,691	+4.88%	34.9	90.4	3,028	1,169	26°05′N 80°17′W
Edinburg	TX	110,700	100,243	+10.43%	44.7	115.8	2,243	866	26°19′N 98°10′W
Pueblo	CO	110,404	111,876	−1.32%	55.4	143.5	2,019	780	38°16′N 104°37′W
Ventura (Note: Official name is San Buenaventura)	CA	109,914	110,763	−0.77%	21.9	56.7	5,058	1,953	34°16′N 119°15′W
Palm Coast	FL	109,886	89,258	+23.11%	95.4	247.1	936	361	29°32′N 81°14′W
Edison	NJ	109,077	107,588	+1.38%	30.1	78.0	3,574	1,380	40°30′N 74°21′W
Costa Mesa	CA	108,881	111,918	−2.71%	15.8	40.9	7,083	2,735	33°40′N 117°55′W
St. George	UT	108,713	95,342	+14.02%	78.5	203.3	1,215	469	37°05′N 113°34′W
Centennial	CO	108,658	108,418	+0.22%	29.7	76.9	3,650	1,410	39°35′N 104°52′W
Downey	CA	108,468	114,355	−5.15%	12.4	32.1	9,222	3,561	33°56′N 118°08′W
Spokane Valley	WA	108,405	102,976	+5.27%	37.7	97.6	2,731	1,054	47°40′N 117°14′W
Sugar Land	TX	107,726	111,026	−2.97%	40.5	104.9	2,741	1,058	29°35′N 95°38′W
Lee's Summit	MO	107,514	101,108	+6.34%	63.9	165.5	1,582	611	38°55′N 94°23′W
Bend	OR	107,342	99,178	+8.23%	33.6	87.0	2,952	1,140	44°04′N 121°19′W
Jurupa Valley	CA	107,311	105,053	+2.15%	42.9	111.1	2,449	946	34°00′N 117°28′W
Georgetown	TX	106,907	67,176	+59.14%	57.3	148.4	1,172	453	30°40′N 97°42′W
Green Bay	WI	106,675	107,395	−0.67%	45.5	117.8	2,360	910	44°31′N 87°59′W
Fayetteville	AR	106,623	93,949	+13.49%	54.1	140.1	1,737	671	36°04′N 94°10′W
Rialto	CA	106,554	104,026	+2.43%	24.1	62.4	4,316	1,666	34°07′N 117°23′W
Brockton	MA	106,134	105,643	+0.46%	21.3	55.2	4,960	1,920	42°05′N 71°01′W
Boulder	CO	105,689	108,250	−2.37%	26.3	68.1	4,116	1,589	40°01′N 105°15′W
Carmel	IN	105,634	99,757	+5.89%	49.1	127.2	2,032	785	39°58′N 86°09′W
Dearborn	MI	105,611	109,976	−3.97%	24.2	62.7	4,544	1,754	42°19′N 83°13′W
West Covina	CA	105,301	109,501	−3.84%	16.0	41.4	6,844	2,642	34°04′N 117°55′W
Yuma	AZ	105,227	95,548	+10.13%	120.7	312.6	792	306	32°31′N 114°31′W
Chico	CA	105,081	101,475	+3.55%	34.1	88.3	2,976	1,149	39°46′N 121°49′W
El Monte	CA	105,075	109,450	−4.00%	9.6	24.9	11,401	4,402	34°04′N 118°02′W
Sandy Springs	GA	105,013	108,080	−2.84%	37.7	97.6	2,867	1,107	33°56′N 84°22′W
Renton	WA	104,975	106,785	−1.69%	23.5	60.9	4,544	1,754	47°29′N 122°11′W
Fishers	IN	104,812	98,977	+5.90%	35.6	92.2	2,780	1,070	39°58′N 85°58′W
Woodbridge	NJ	104,802	103,639	+1.12%	23.3	60.3	4,448	1,717	40°34′N 74°17′W
Suffolk	VA	104,699	94,324	+11.00%	399.2	1,033.9	236	91	36°42′N 76°38′W
Lynn	MA	104,236	101,253	+2.95%	10.7	27.7	9,463	3,654	42°28′N 70°58′W
Vacaville	CA	103,850	102,386	+1.43%	29.9	77.4	3,424	1,322	38°22′N 121°58′W
San Mateo	CA	103,337	105,661	−2.20%	12.1	31.3	8,732	3,371	37°34′N 122°19′W
South Bend	IN	103,201	103,453	−0.24%	42.0	108.8	2,463	951	41°41′N 86°16′W
Quincy	MA	103,173	101,636	+1.51%	16.6	43.0	6,123	2,364	42°16′N 71°01′W
Burbank	CA	102,988	107,337	−4.05%	17.3	44.8	6,204	2,395	34°11′N 118°20′W
Hesperia	CA	102,605	99,818	+2.79%	72.7	188.3	1,373	530	34°24′N 117°19′W
Wichita Falls	TX	101,951	102,316	−0.36%	72.0	186.5	1,421	549	33°55′N 98°32′W
Tracy	CA	101,901	93,000	+9.57%	25.9	67.1	3,591	1,386	37°44′N 121°27′W
New Bedford	MA	101,834	101,079	+0.75%	20.0	51.8	5,054	1,951	41°40′N 70°56′W
El Cajon	CA	101,755	106,215	−4.20%	14.5	37.6	7,325	2,828	32°48′N 116°58′W
Albany	NY	101,698	99,224	+2.49%	21.4	55.4	4,637	1,790	42°40′N 73°48′W
Inglewood	CA	101,662	107,762	−5.66%	9.1	23.6	11,842	4,572	33°58′N 118°20′W
Boca Raton	FL	101,582	97,422	+4.27%	29.2	75.6	3,336	1,288	26°22′N 80°06′W
Fort Myers	FL	101,581	86,395	+17.58%	39.8	103.1	2,171	838	26°37′N 81°50′W
Clinton (Note: Incorporated as a charter township. In Michigan, charter townships are granted certain rights and responsibilities of home rule that are similar to those of a city or village.)	MI	101,374	100,513	+0.86%	28.0	72.5	3,590	1,390	42°35′N 82°55′W
Daly City	CA	101,261	104,901	−3.47%	7.6	19.7	13,803	5,329	37°41′N 122°28′W
Avondale	AZ	100,983	89,334	+13.04%	47.3	122.5	1,889	729	33°19′N 112°20′W
Toms River	NJ	100,899	95,438	+5.72%	40.5	104.9	2,356	910	39°59′N 74°10′W
San Angelo	TX	100,640	99,893	+0.75%	59.7	154.6	1,673	646	31°26′N 100°27′W
Edmond	OK	100,479	94,428	+6.41%	84.6	219.1	1,116	431	35°40′N 97°25′W
Davenport	IA	100,358	101,724	−1.34%	63.8	165.2	1,594	615	41°34′N 90°36′W
Deltona	FL	100,267	93,692	+7.02%	37.3	96.6	2,512	970	28°55′N 81°13′W
Longmont	CO	100,109	98,885	+1.24%	28.8	74.6	3,434	1,326	40°10′N 105°06′W

=== Distribution ===
The total 2020 enumerated population of all incorporated municipalities over 100,000 is 96,598,047, representing 29.14% of the United States population (excluding territories) and covering a total land area of 29,588 square miles (76,630 km^{2}). The mean municipality population is 301,765, and the mean density is 4,151 inhabitants per square mile (1,603/km^{2}).

Population	Number of municipal governments
1,000,000+	12
900,000–999,999	4
800,000–899,999	1
700,000–799,999	4
600,000–699,999	8
500,000–599,999	10
400,000–499,999	13
300,000–399,999	20
200,000–299,999	57
100,000–199,999	219
Total	348

State	Number of listed municipalities
California	76
Texas	44
Florida	26
Arizona	14
Colorado	13
North Carolina	10
Massachusetts, Washington	9
Georgia, Illinois, Michigan, New Jersey, Virginia	8
Indiana, Missouri, New York, Ohio, Oregon, Tennessee	6
Alabama, Connecticut, Kansas, Nevada, Oklahoma, Utah	5
Louisiana	4
Idaho, Iowa, Minnesota, New Mexico, Pennsylvania, South Carolina, Wisconsin	3
Arkansas, Kentucky, Nebraska	2
Alaska, District of Columbia, Hawaii, Maryland, Mississippi, Montana, New Hampshire, North Dakota, Rhode Island, South Dakota	1
Delaware, Maine, Vermont, West Virginia, Wyoming	0

=== Gallery ===
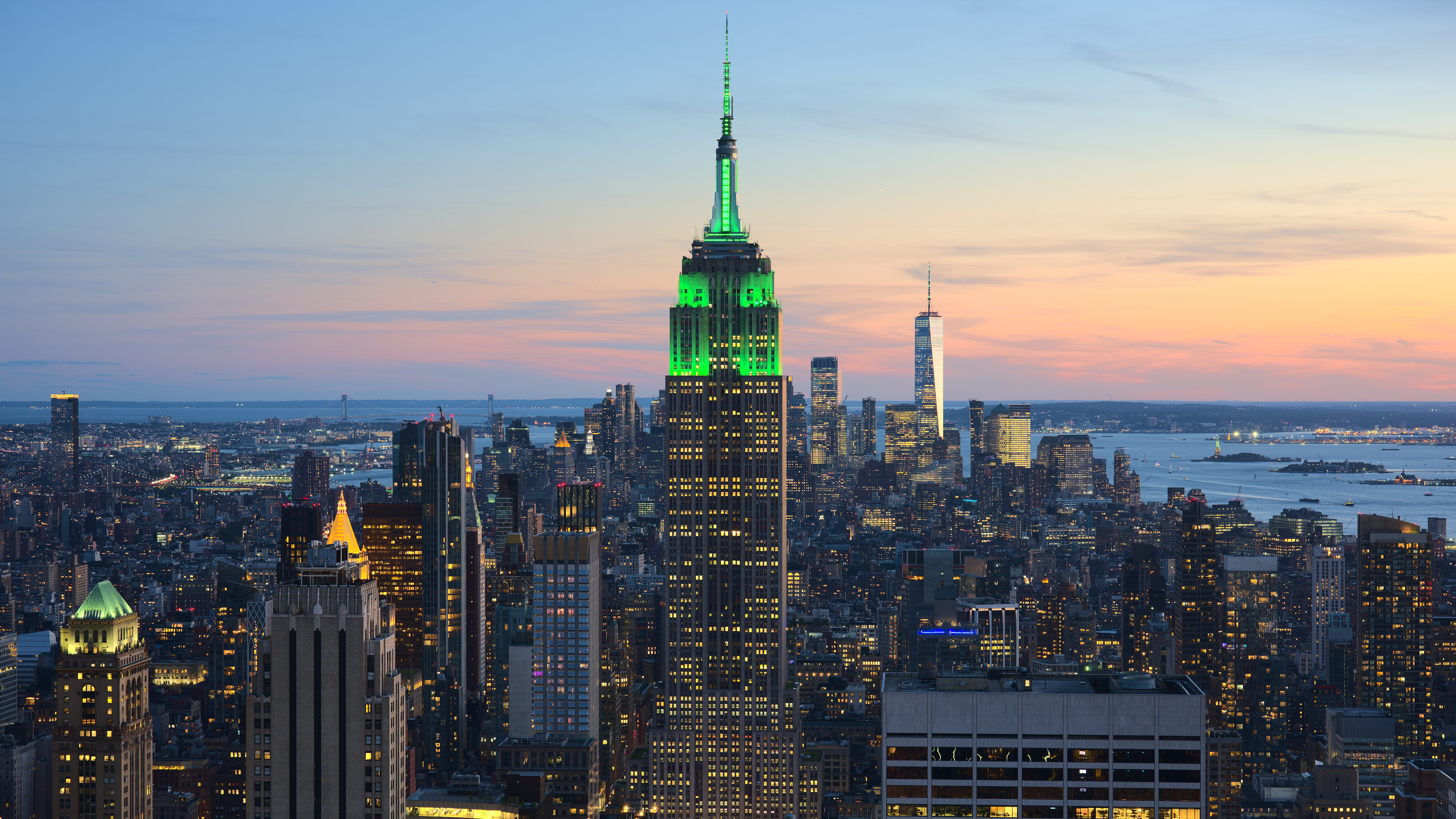
1. New York, New York

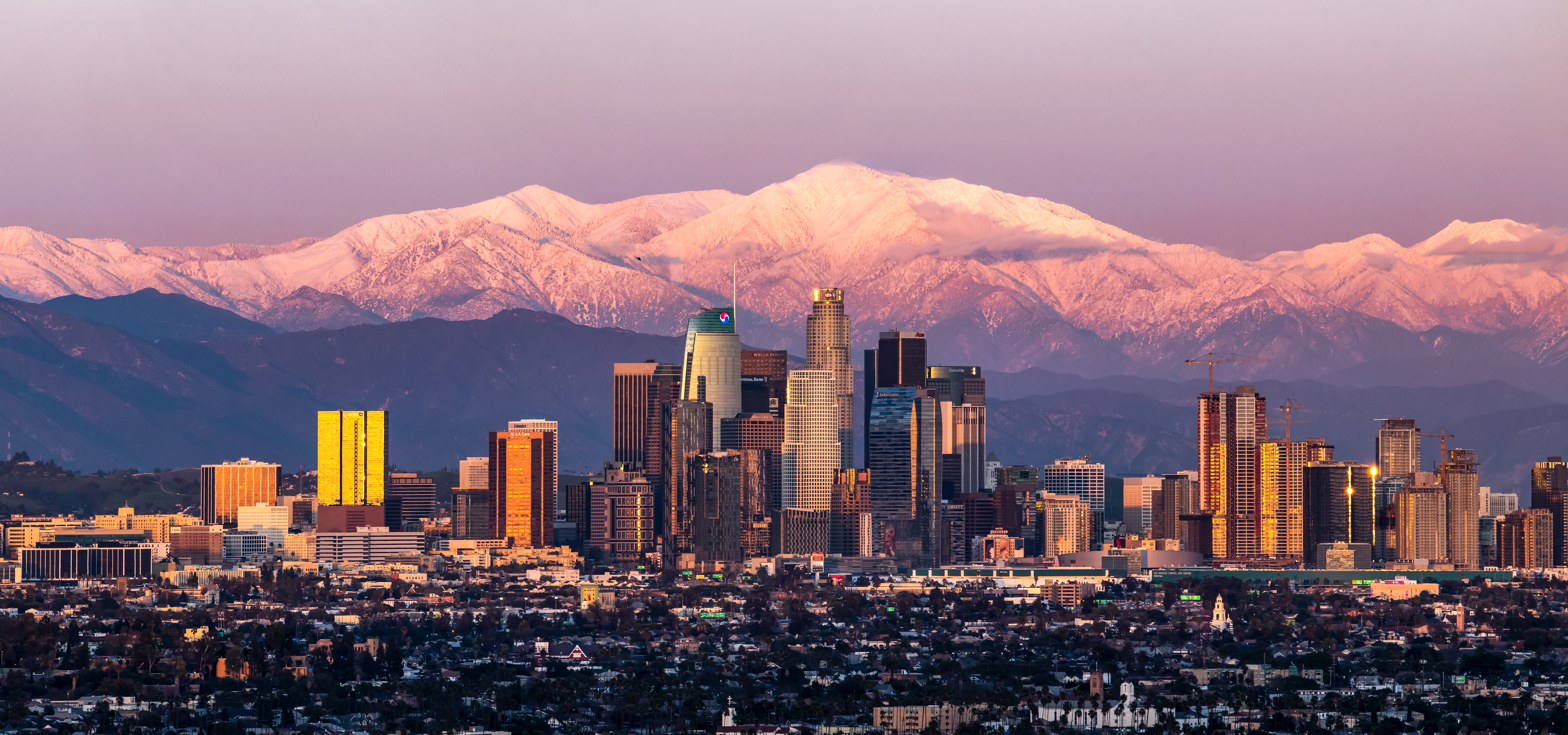
2. Los Angeles, California

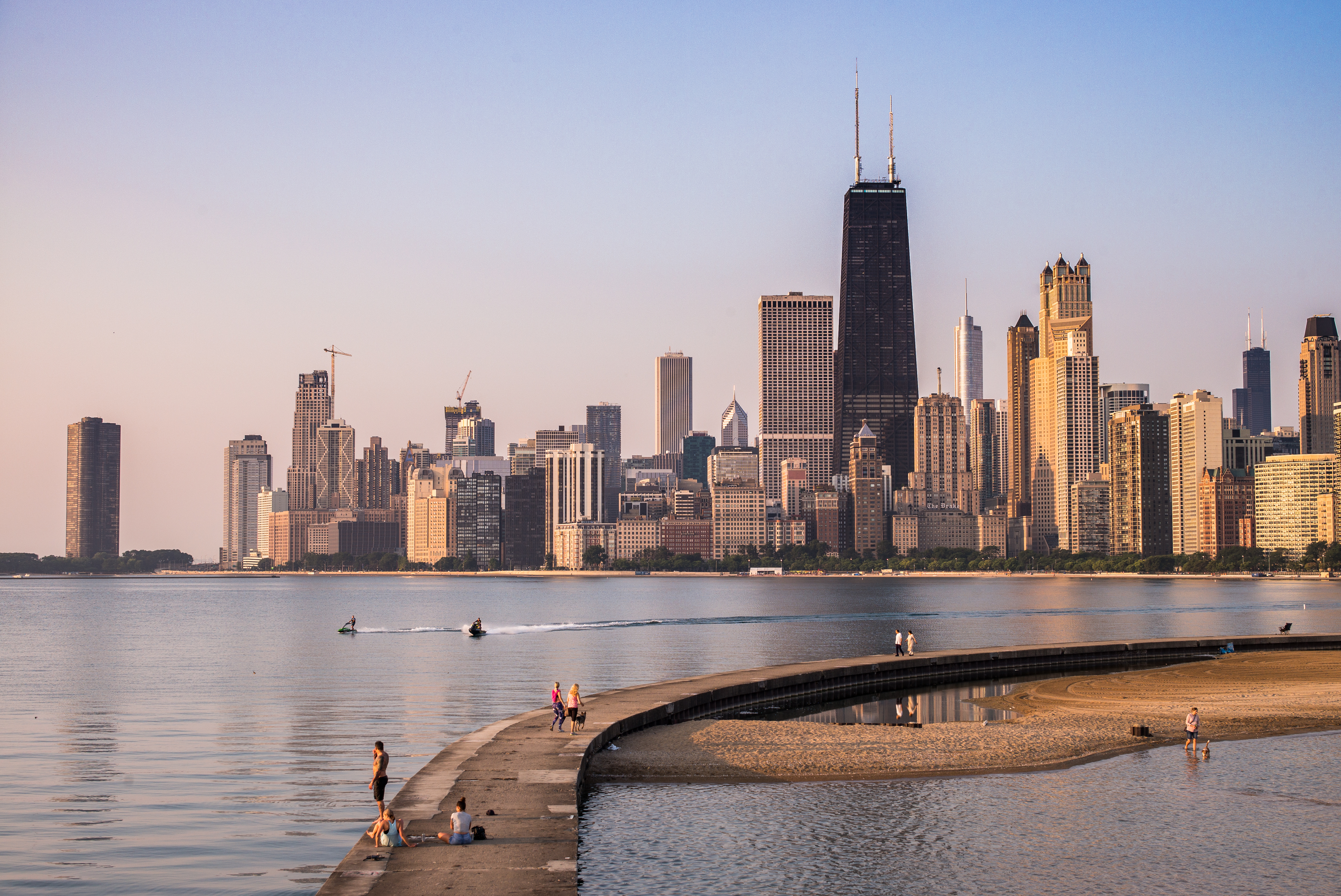
3. Chicago, Illinois

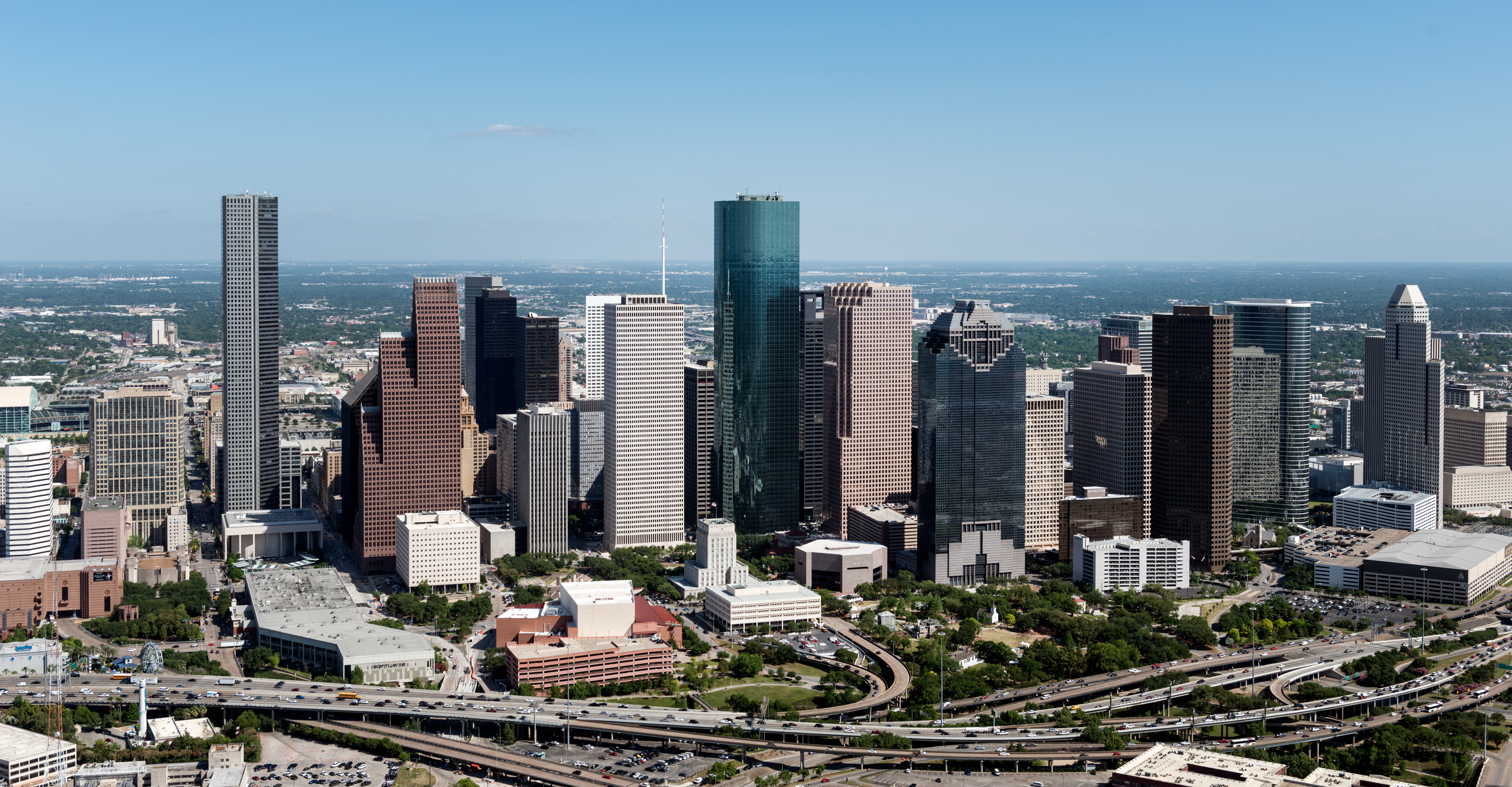
4. Houston, Texas

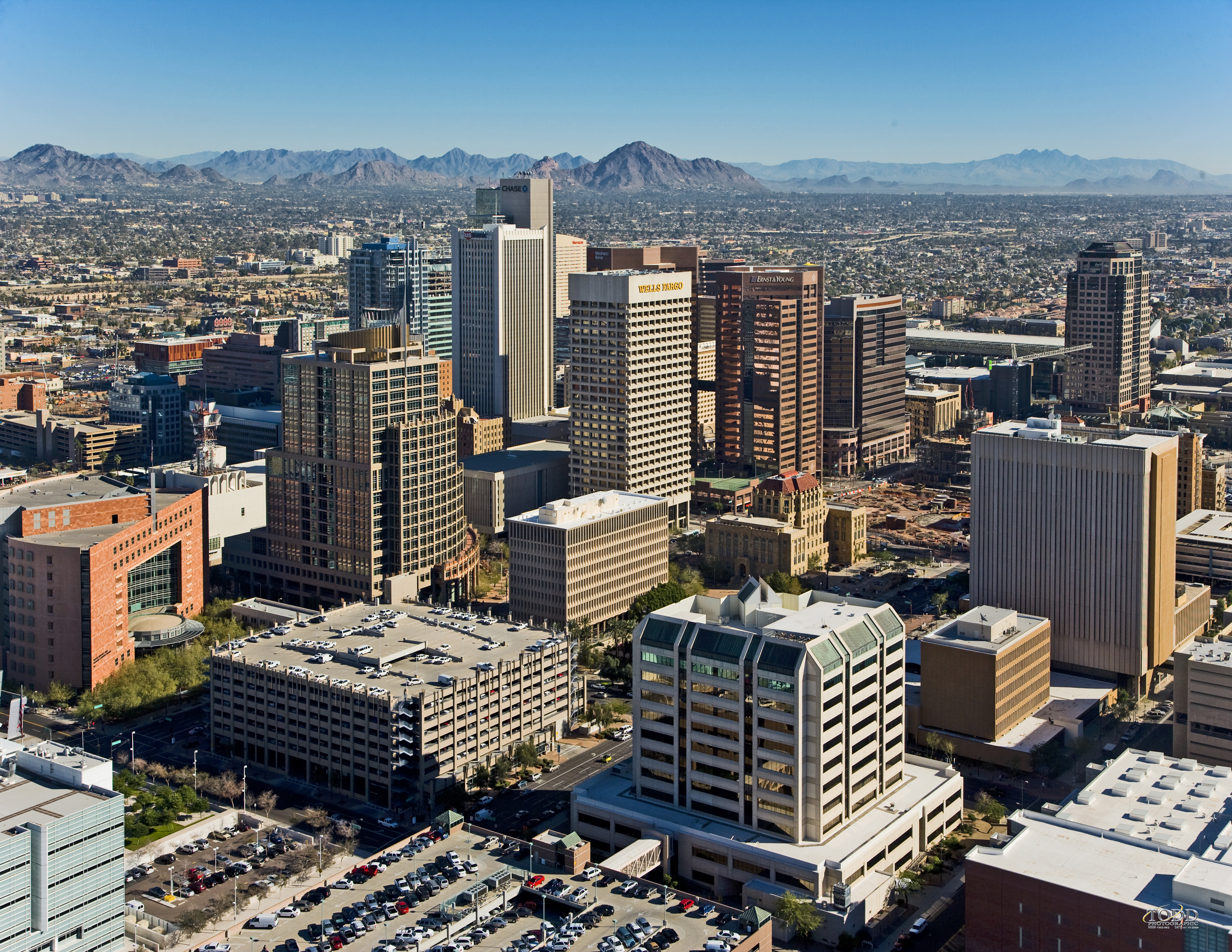
5. Phoenix, Arizona

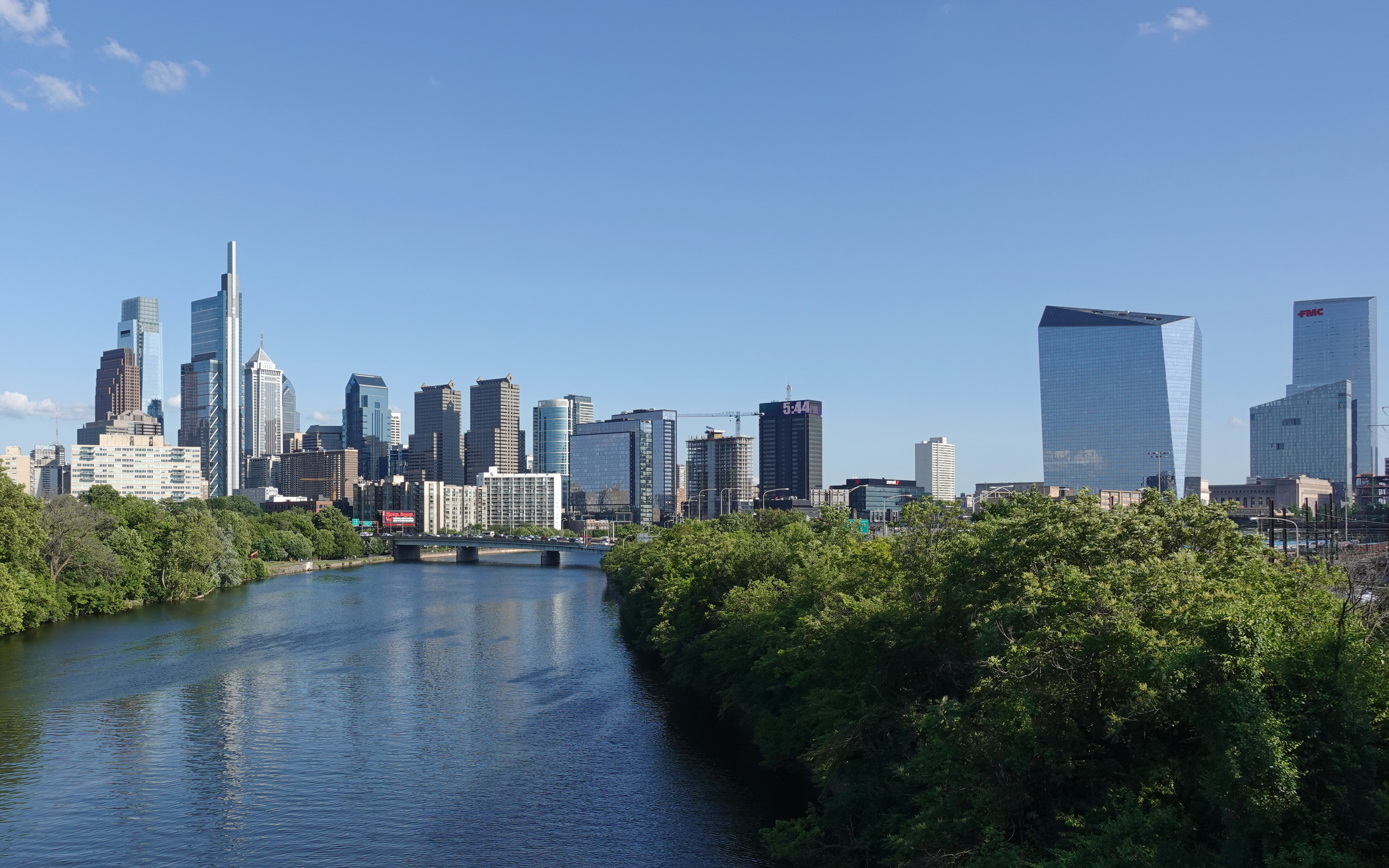
6. Philadelphia, Pennsylvania

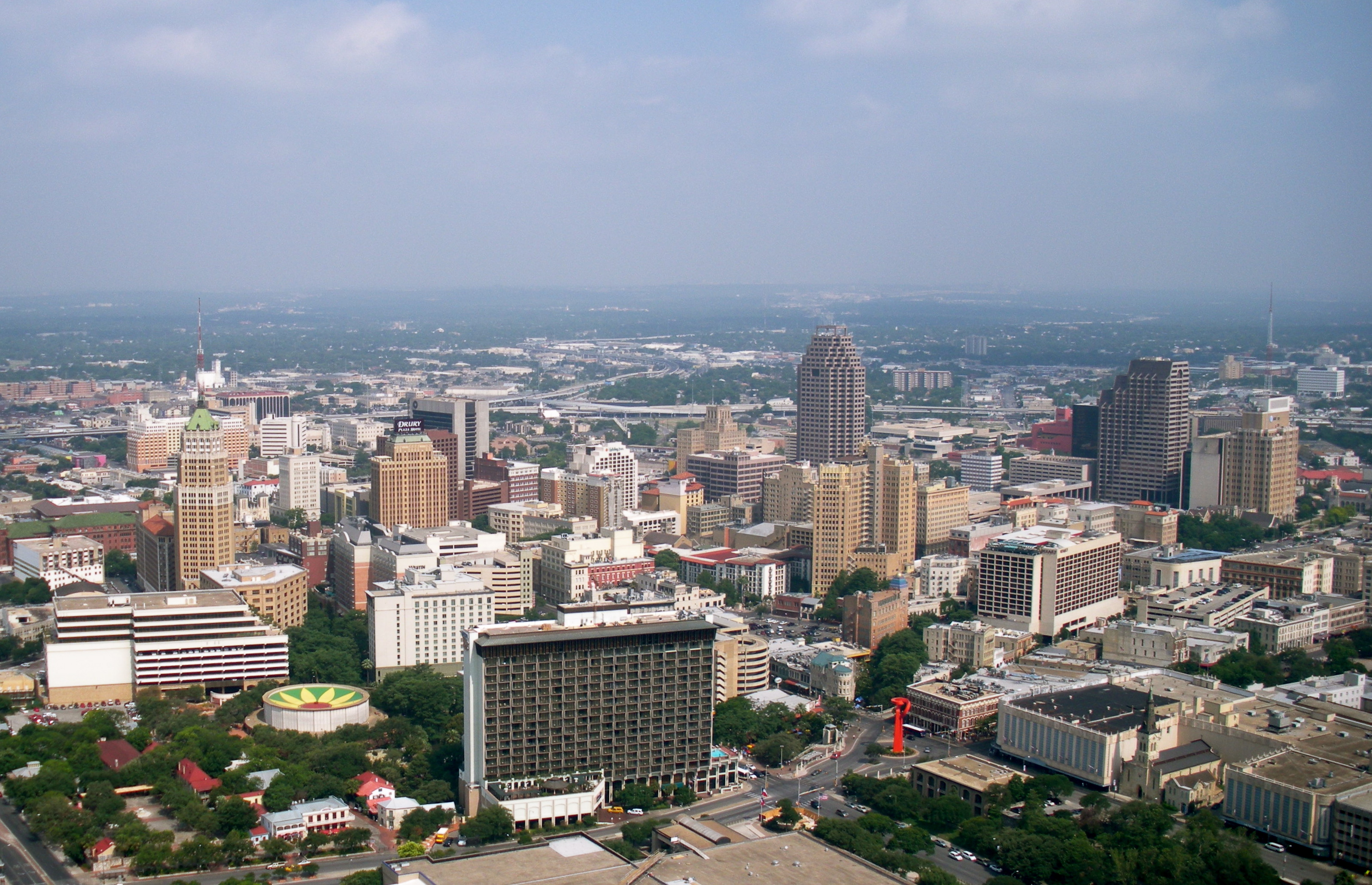
7. San Antonio, Texas

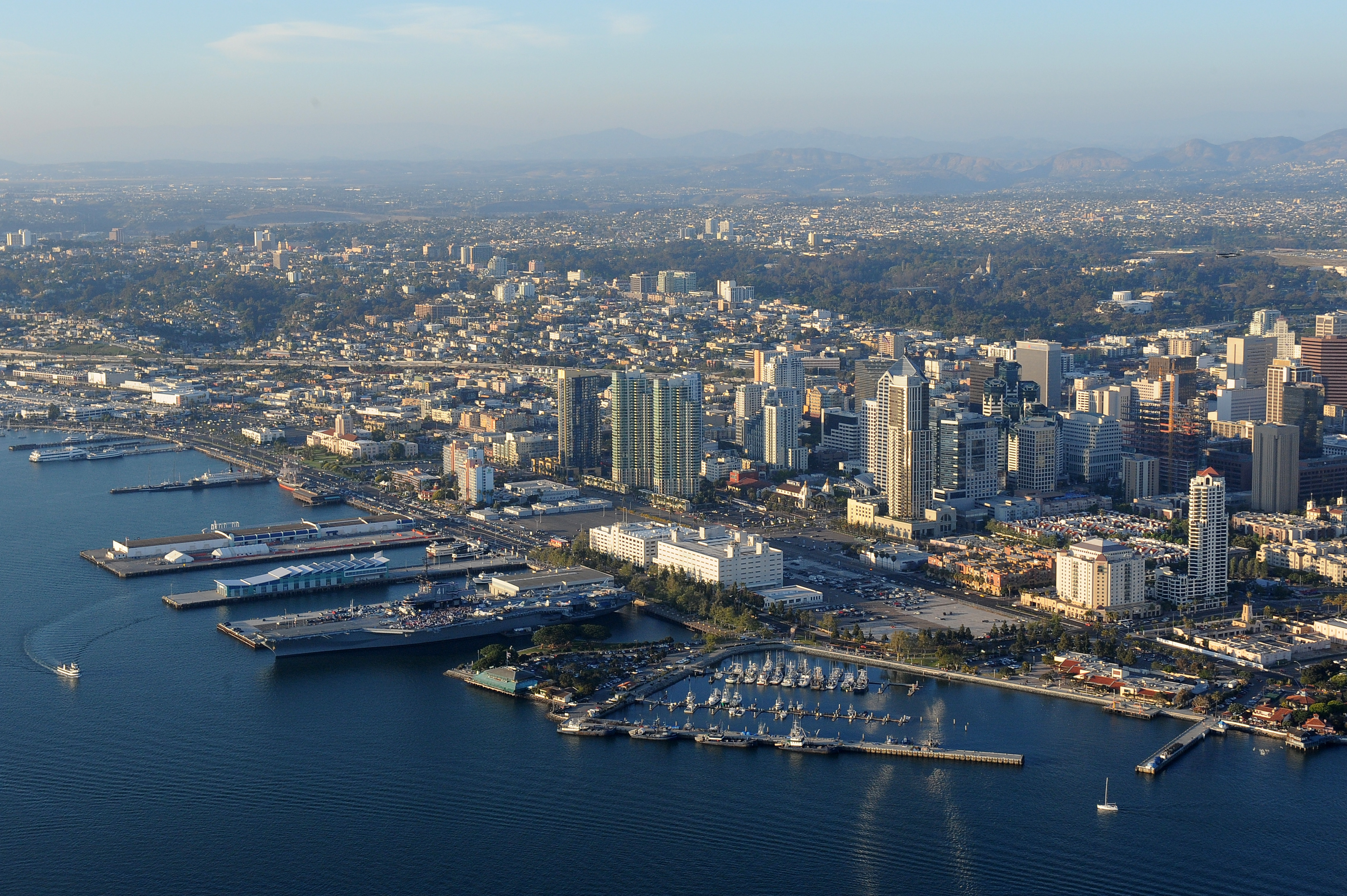
8. San Diego, California

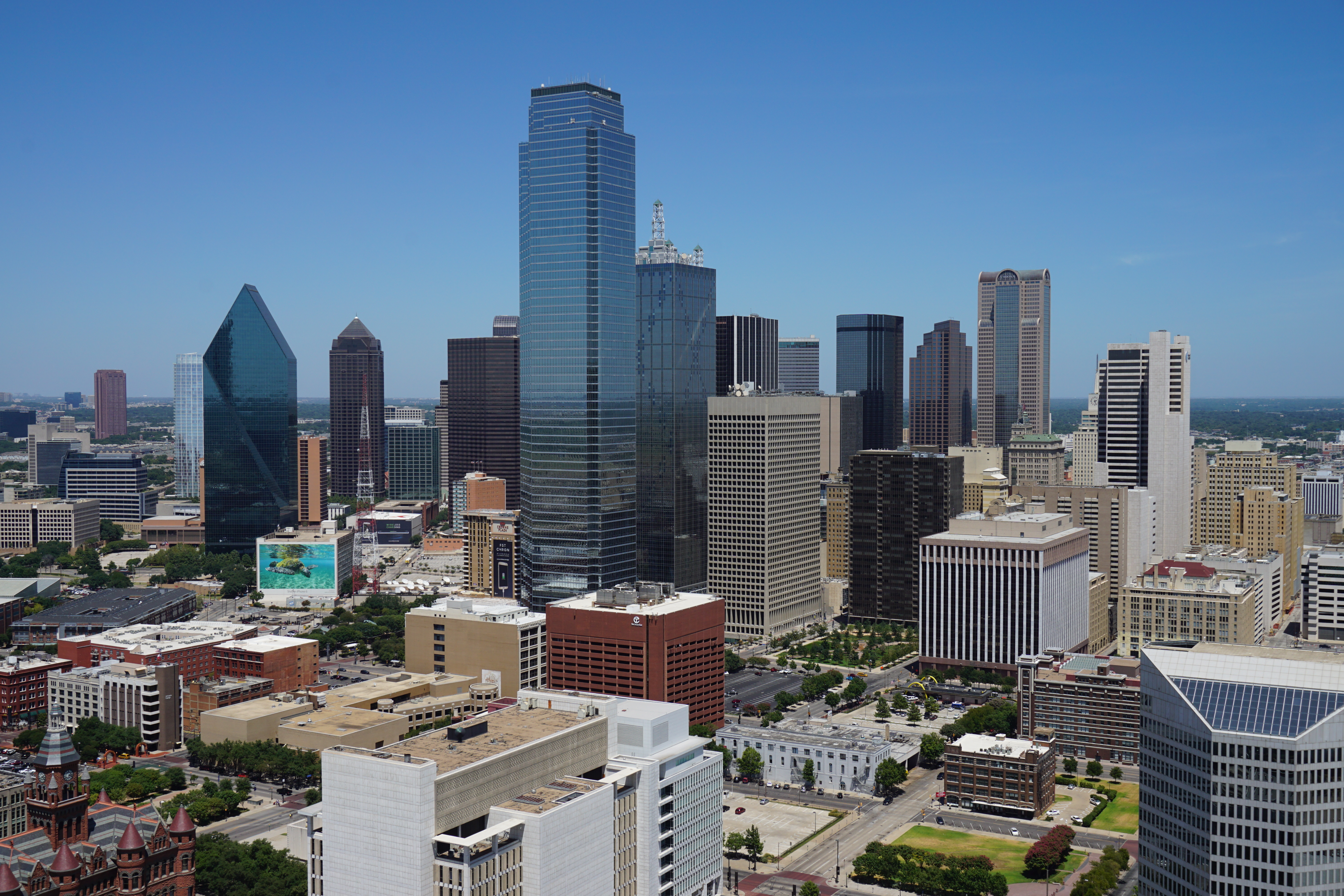
9. Dallas, Texas

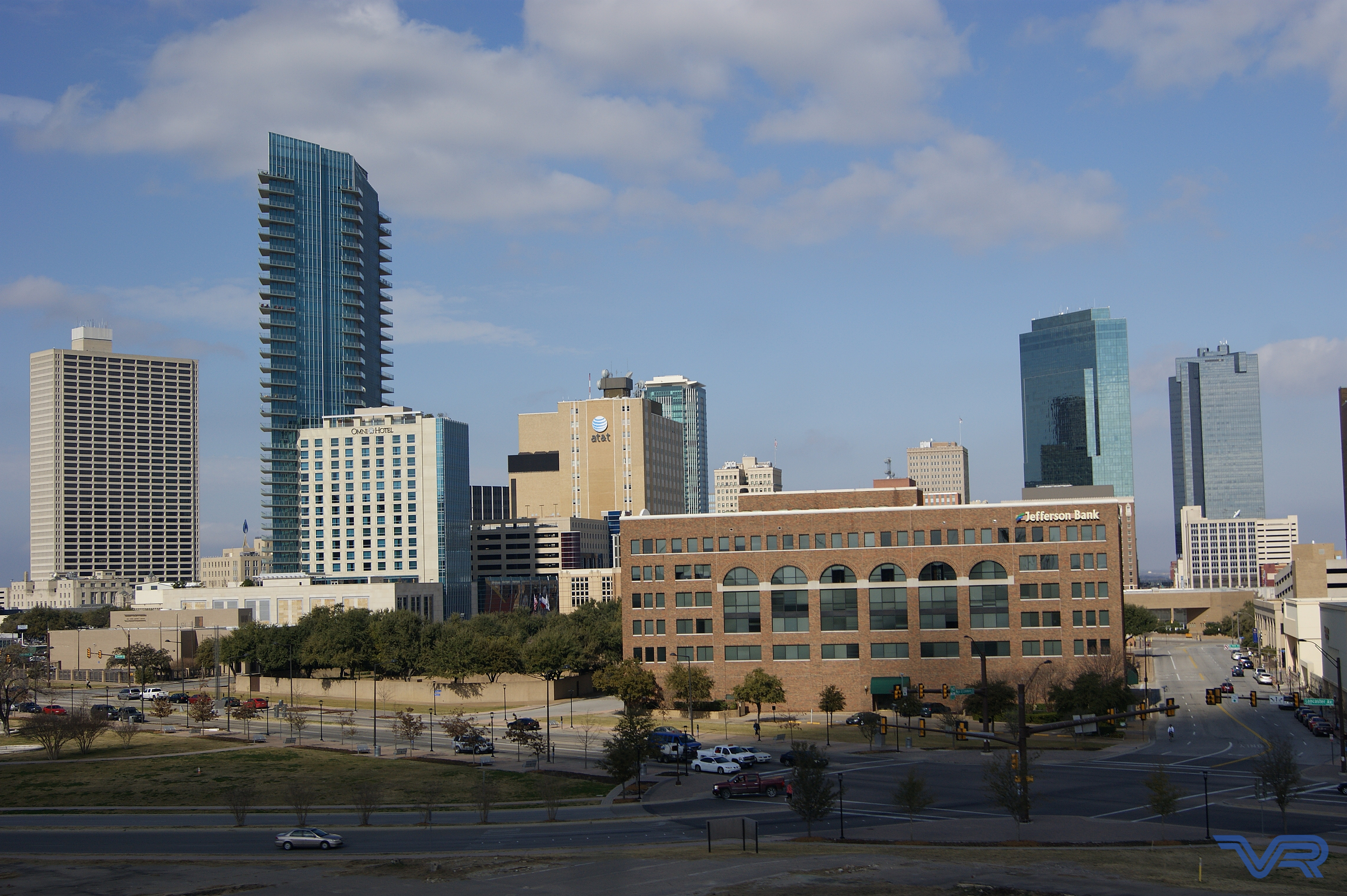
10. Fort Worth, Texas

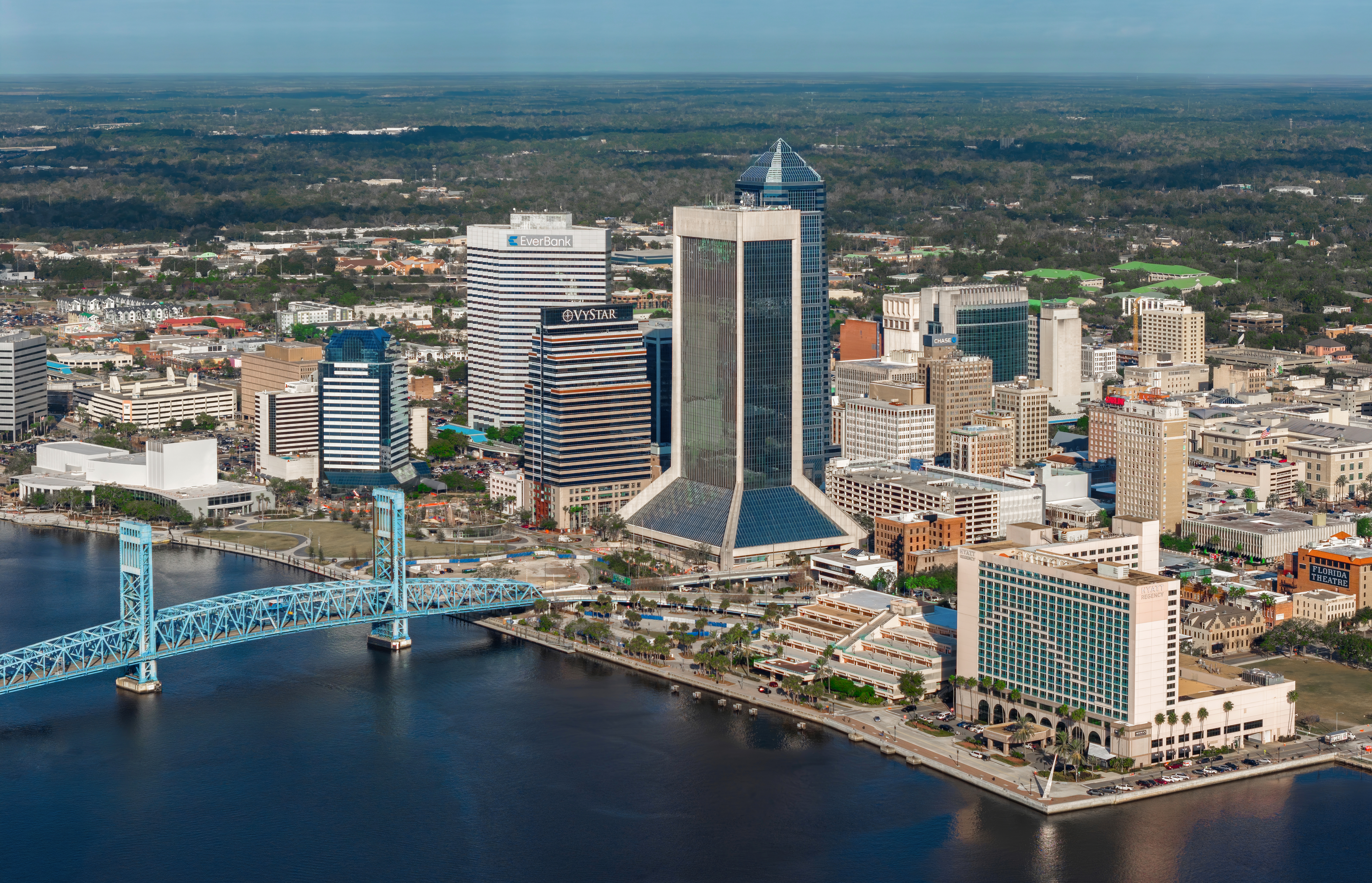
11. Jacksonville, Florida

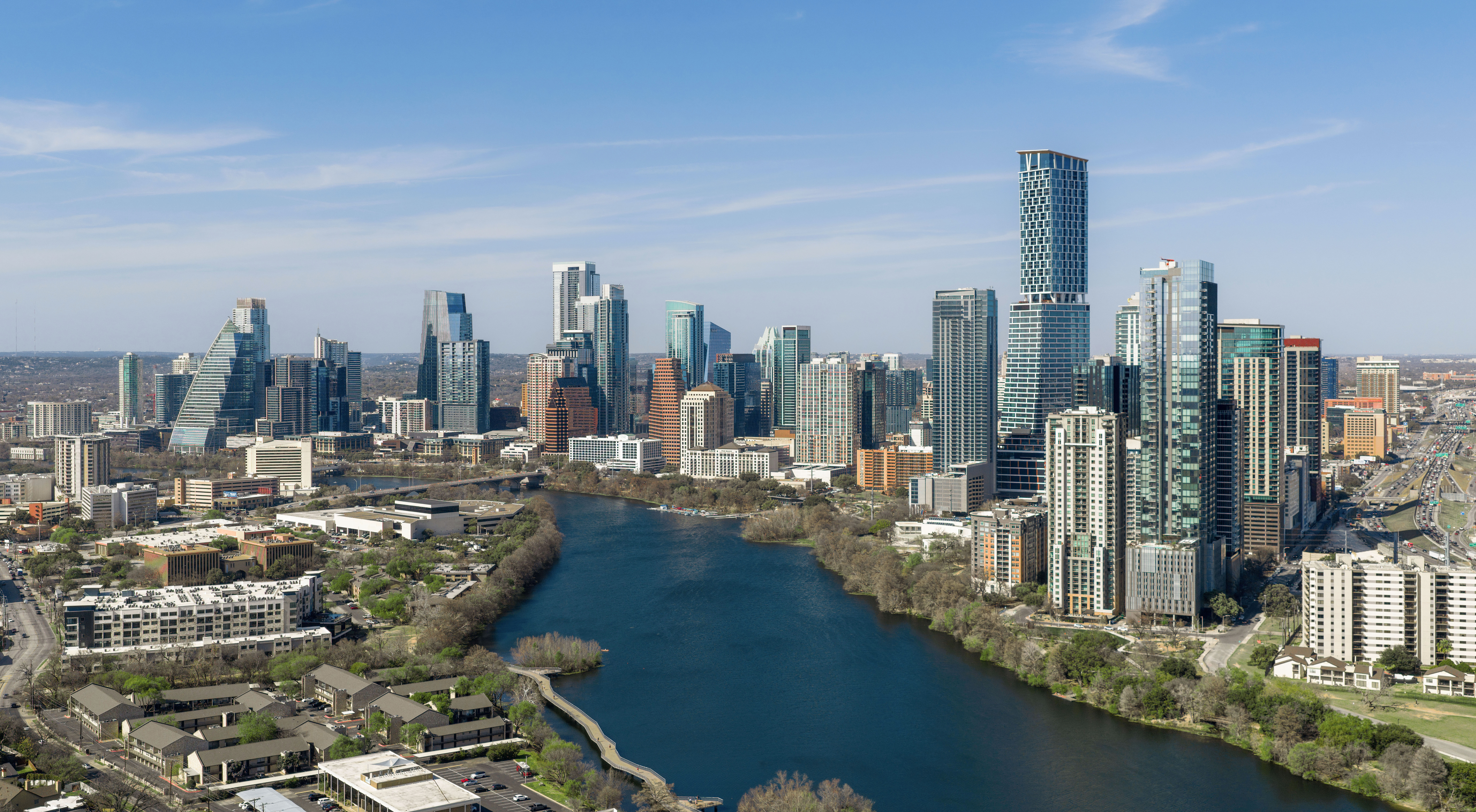
12. Austin, Texas

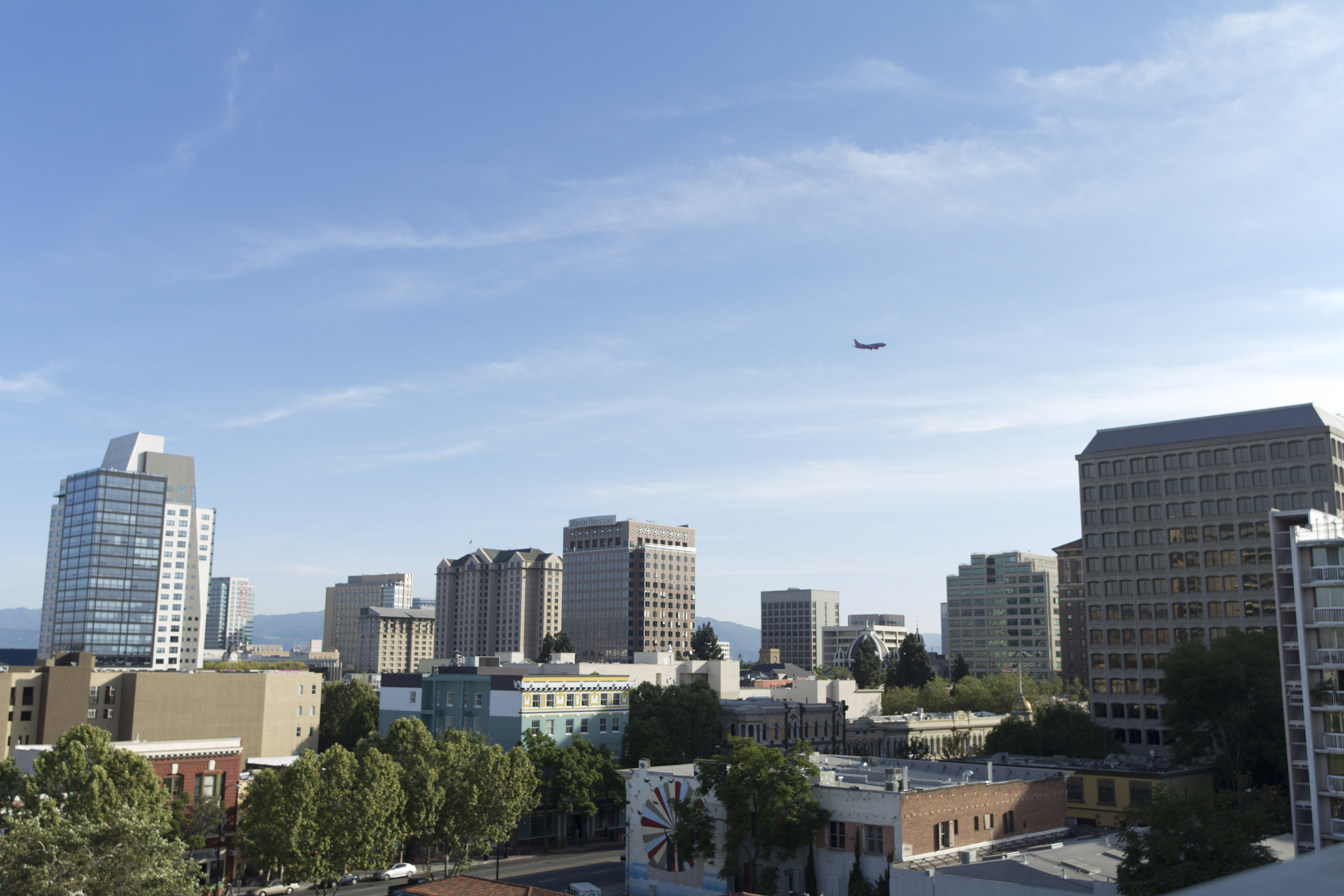
13. San Jose, California

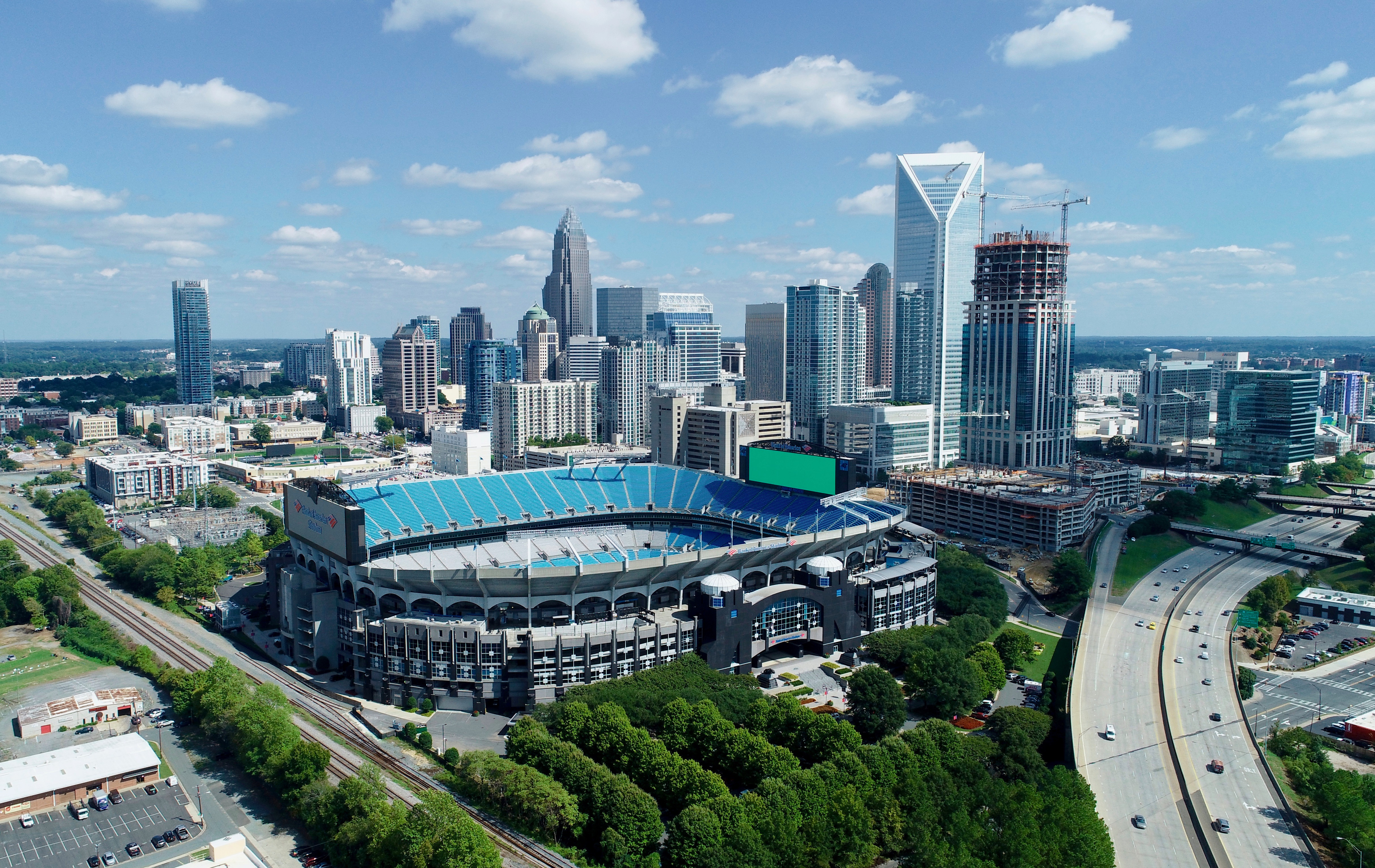
14. Charlotte, North Carolina

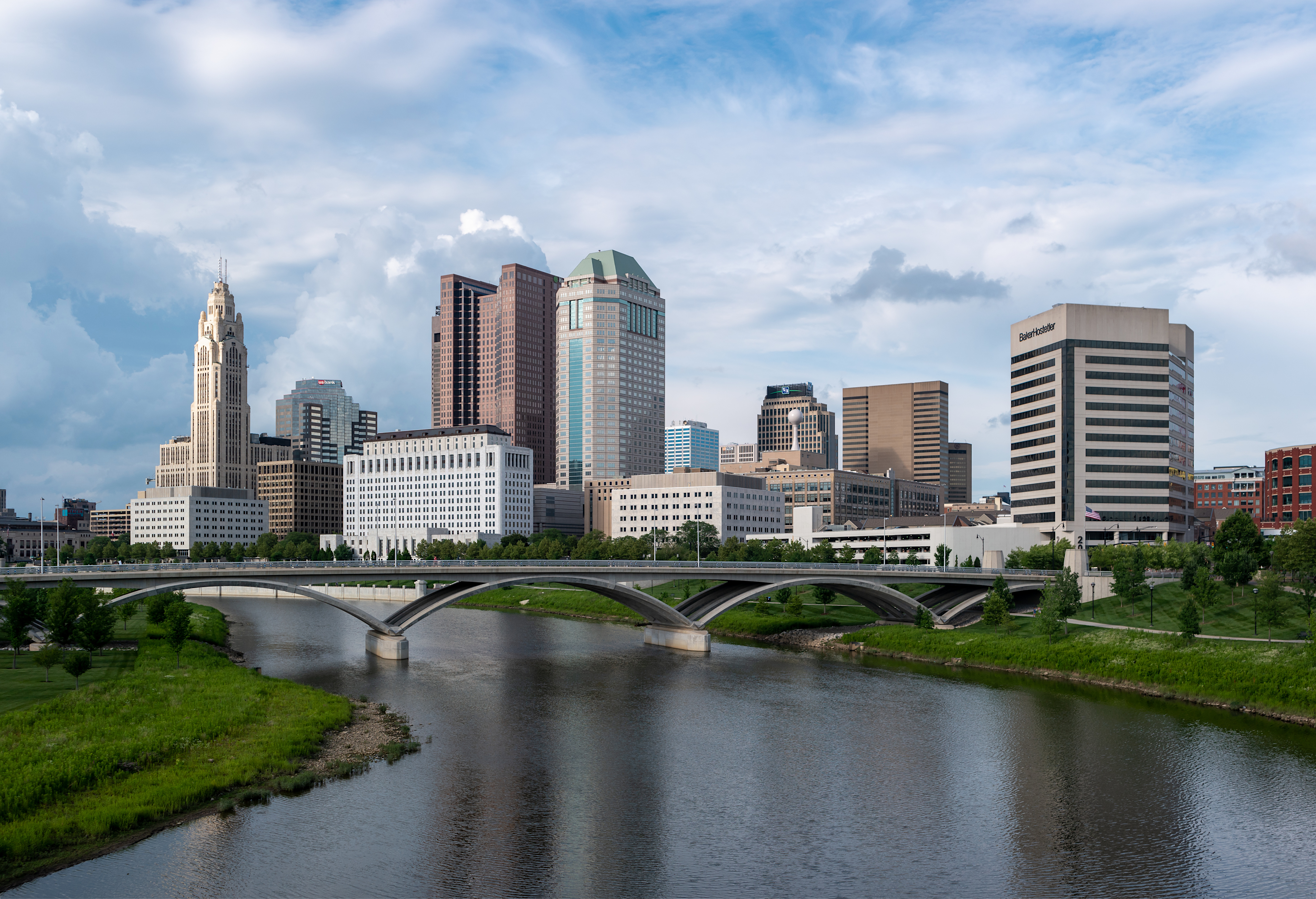
15. Columbus, Ohio

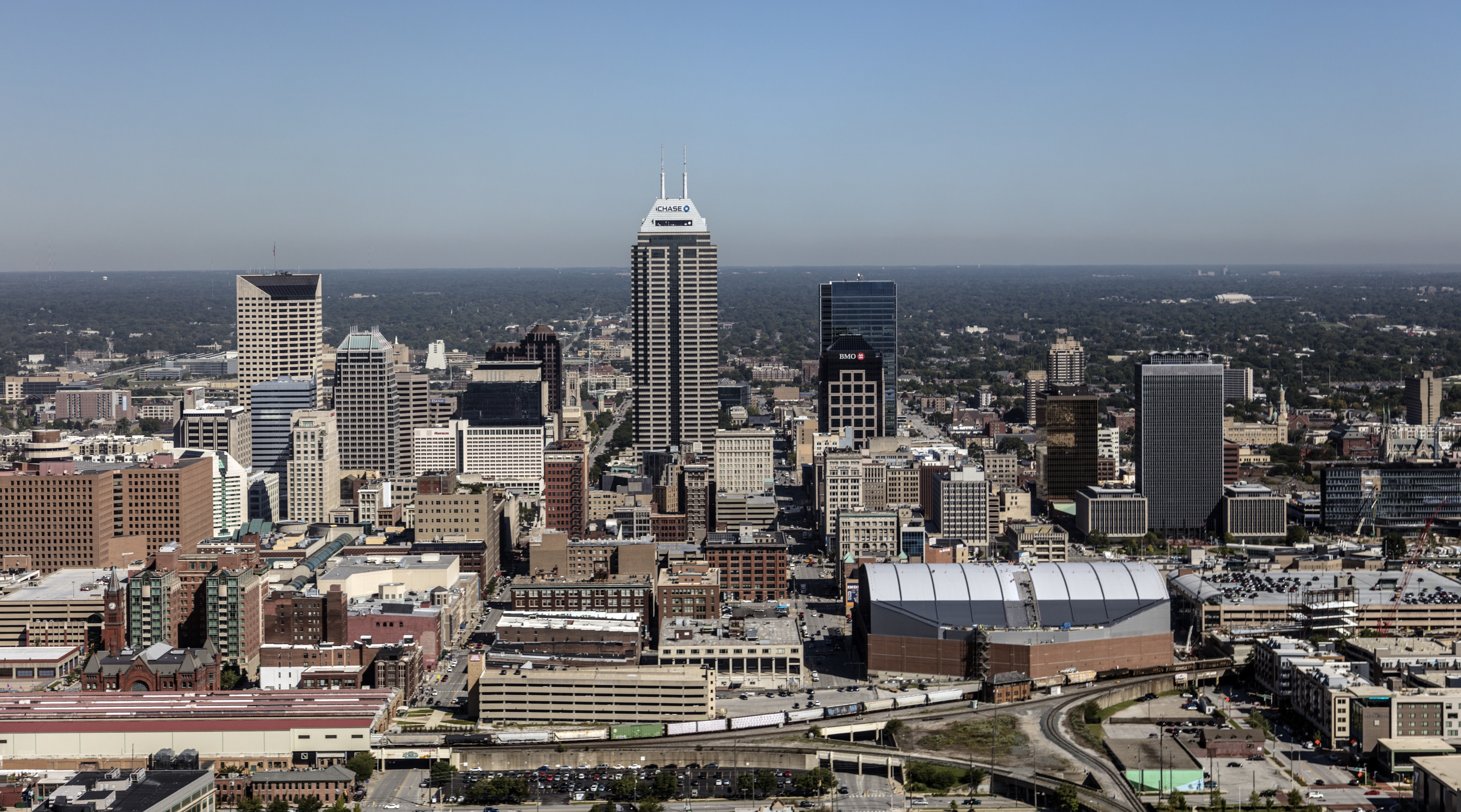
16. Indianapolis, Indiana

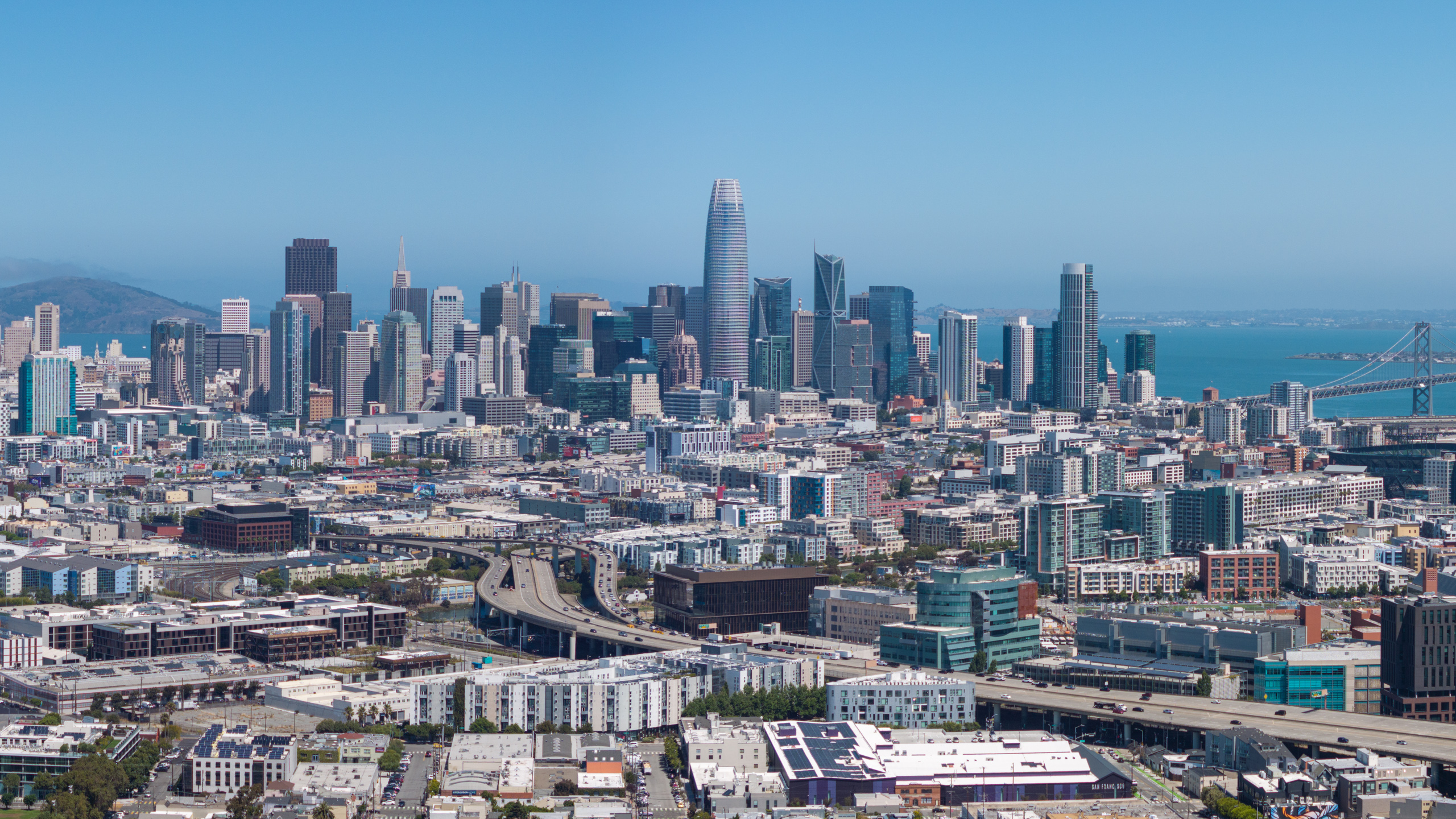
17. San Francisco, California

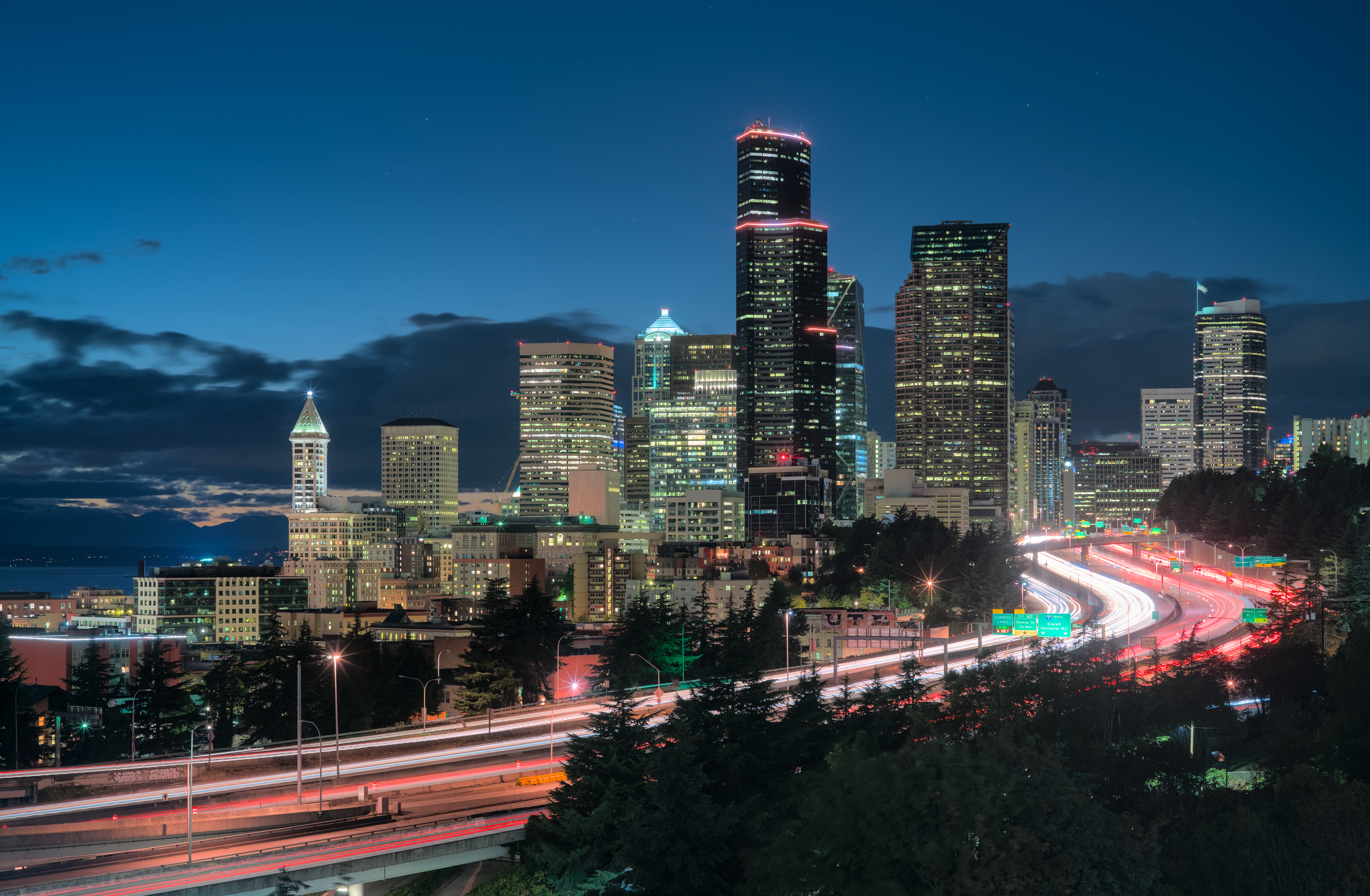
18. Seattle, Washington

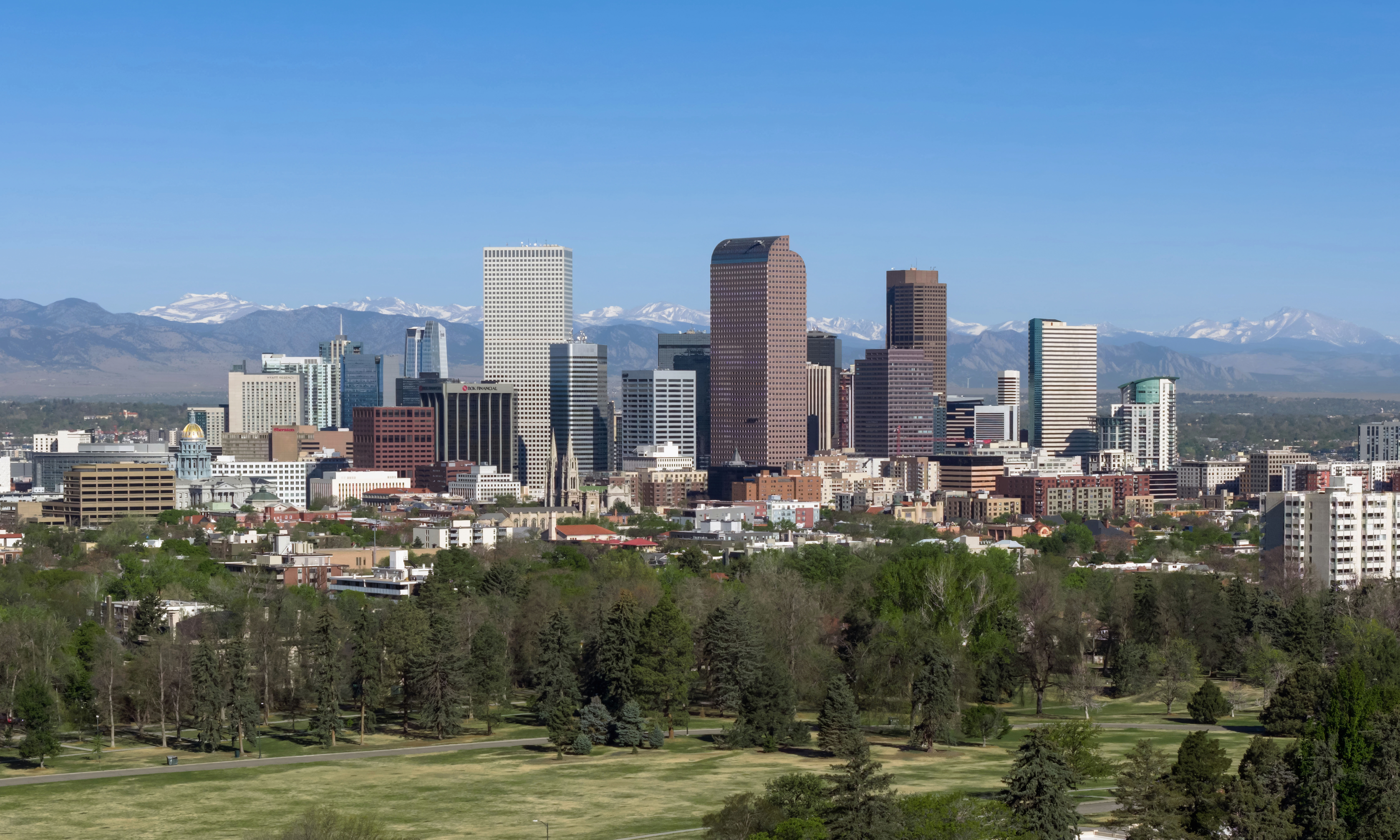
19. Denver, Colorado

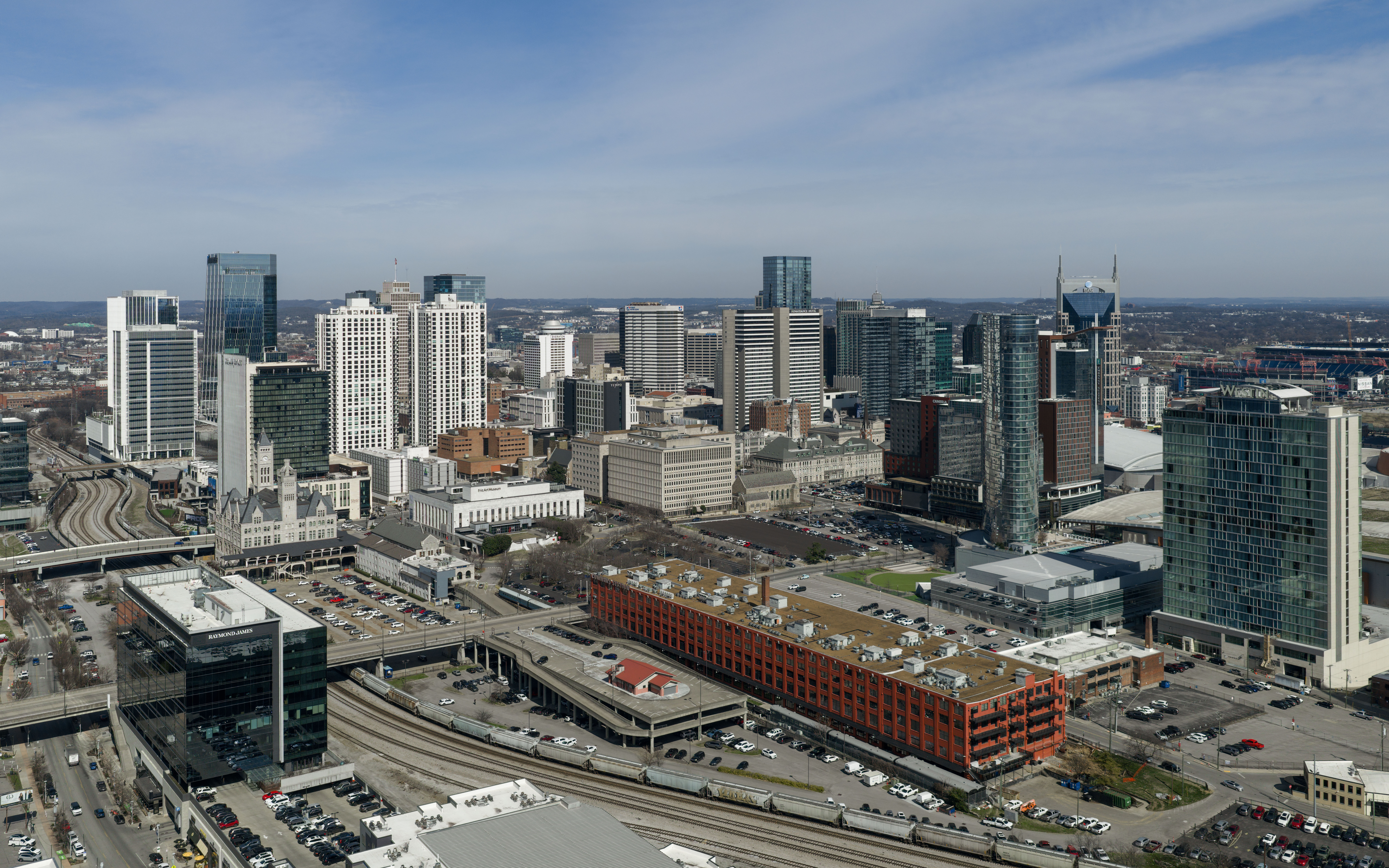
20. Nashville, Tennessee

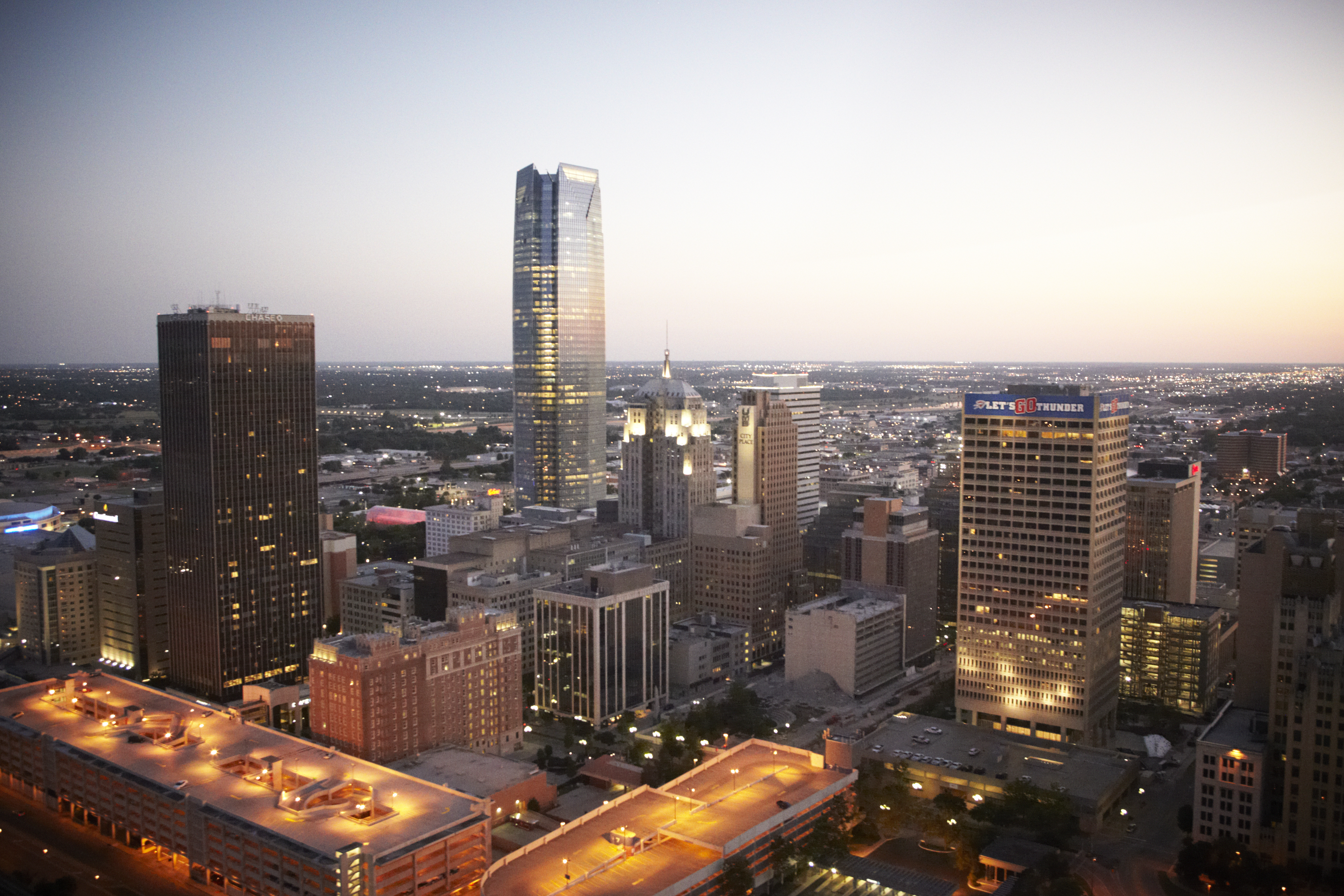
21. Oklahoma City, Oklahoma

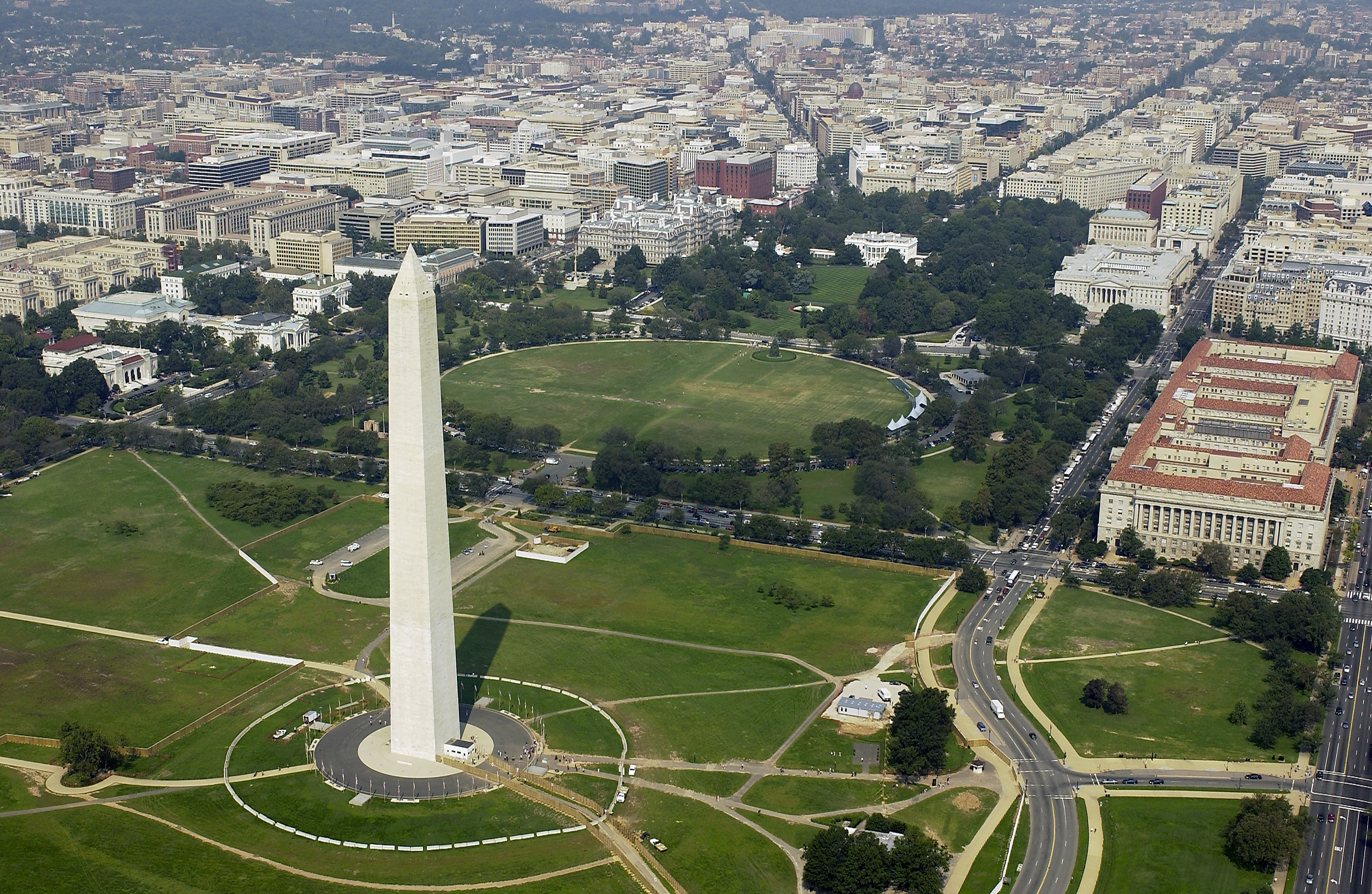
22. Washington, District of Columbia

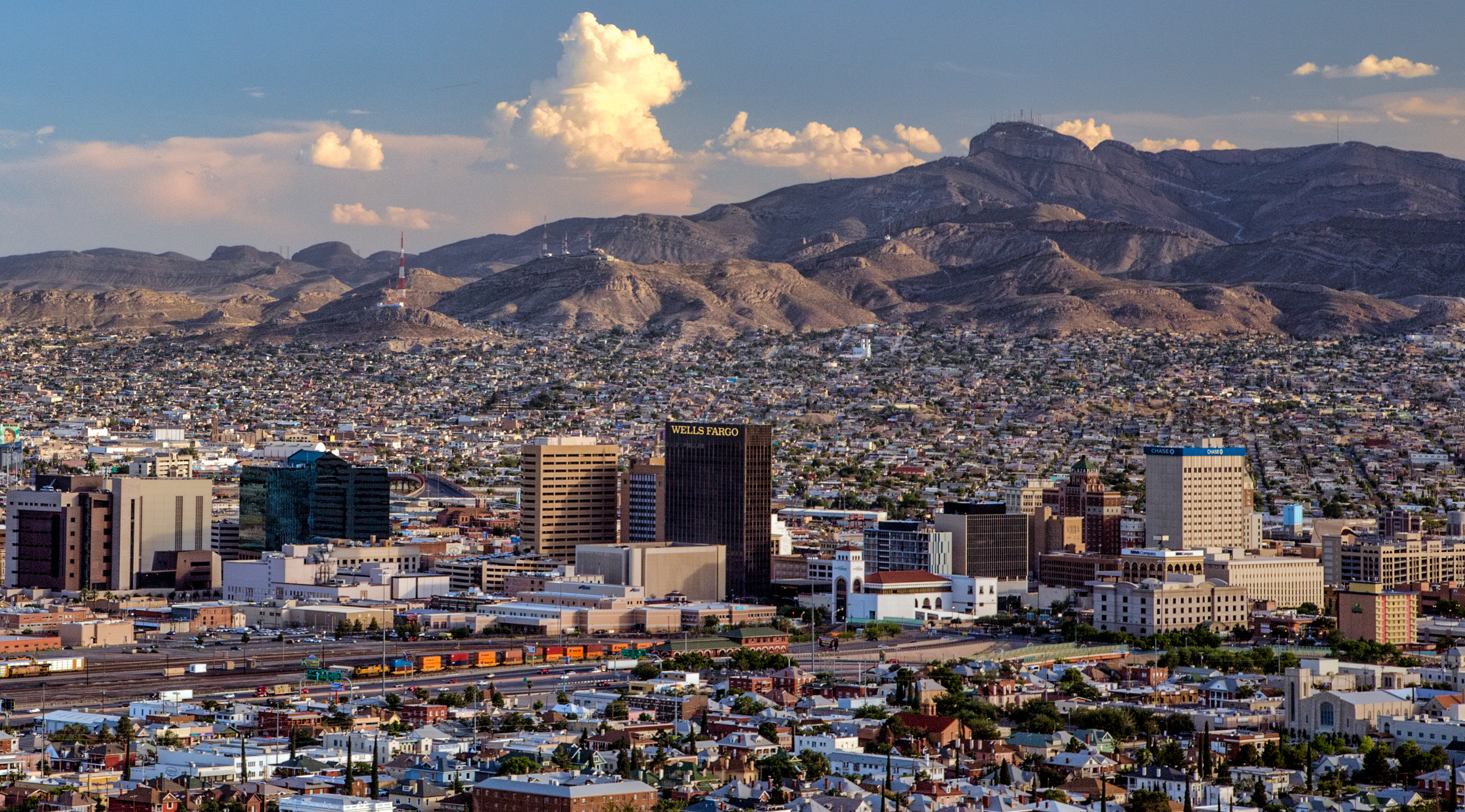
23. El Paso, Texas

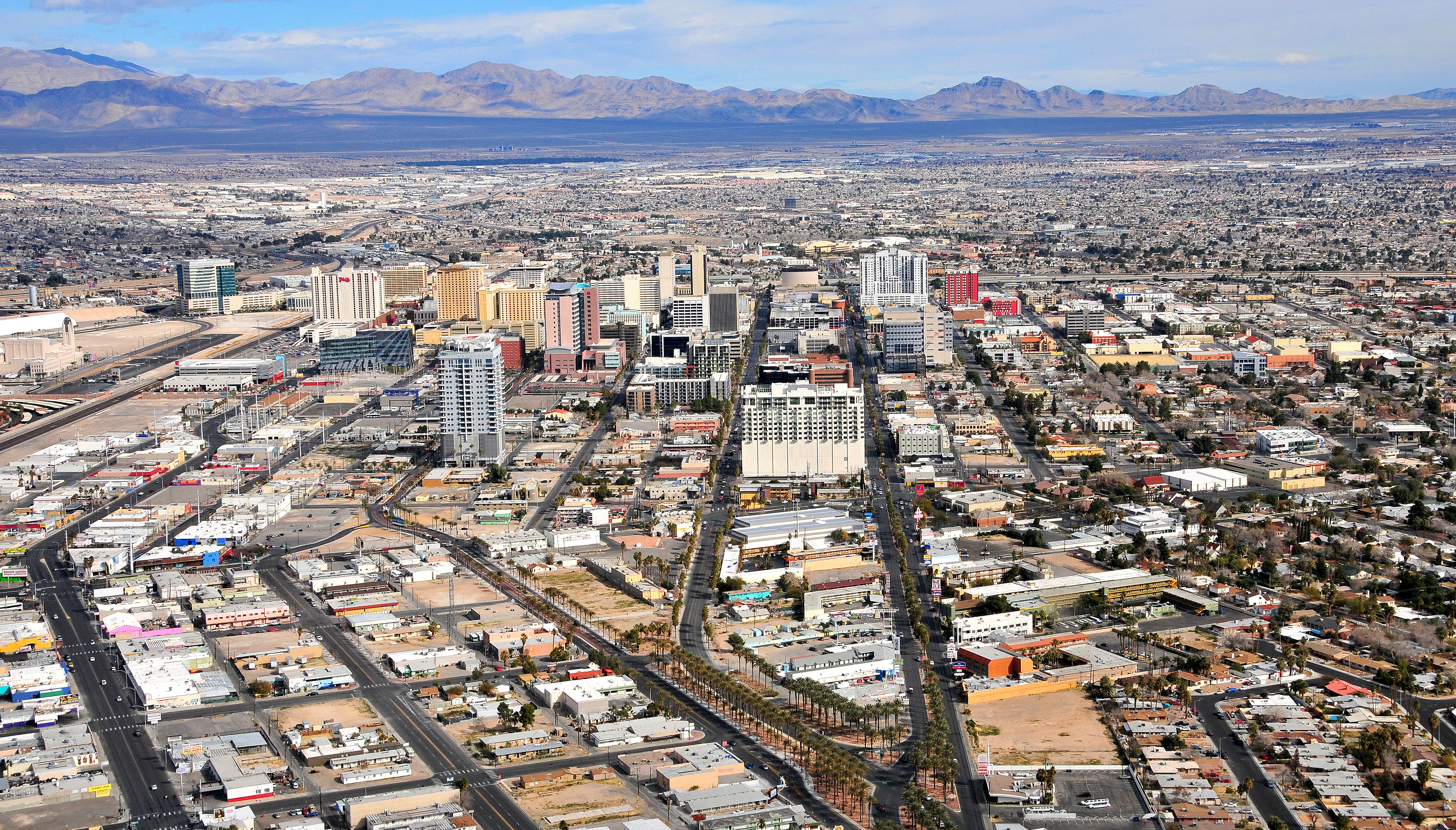
24. Las Vegas, Nevada

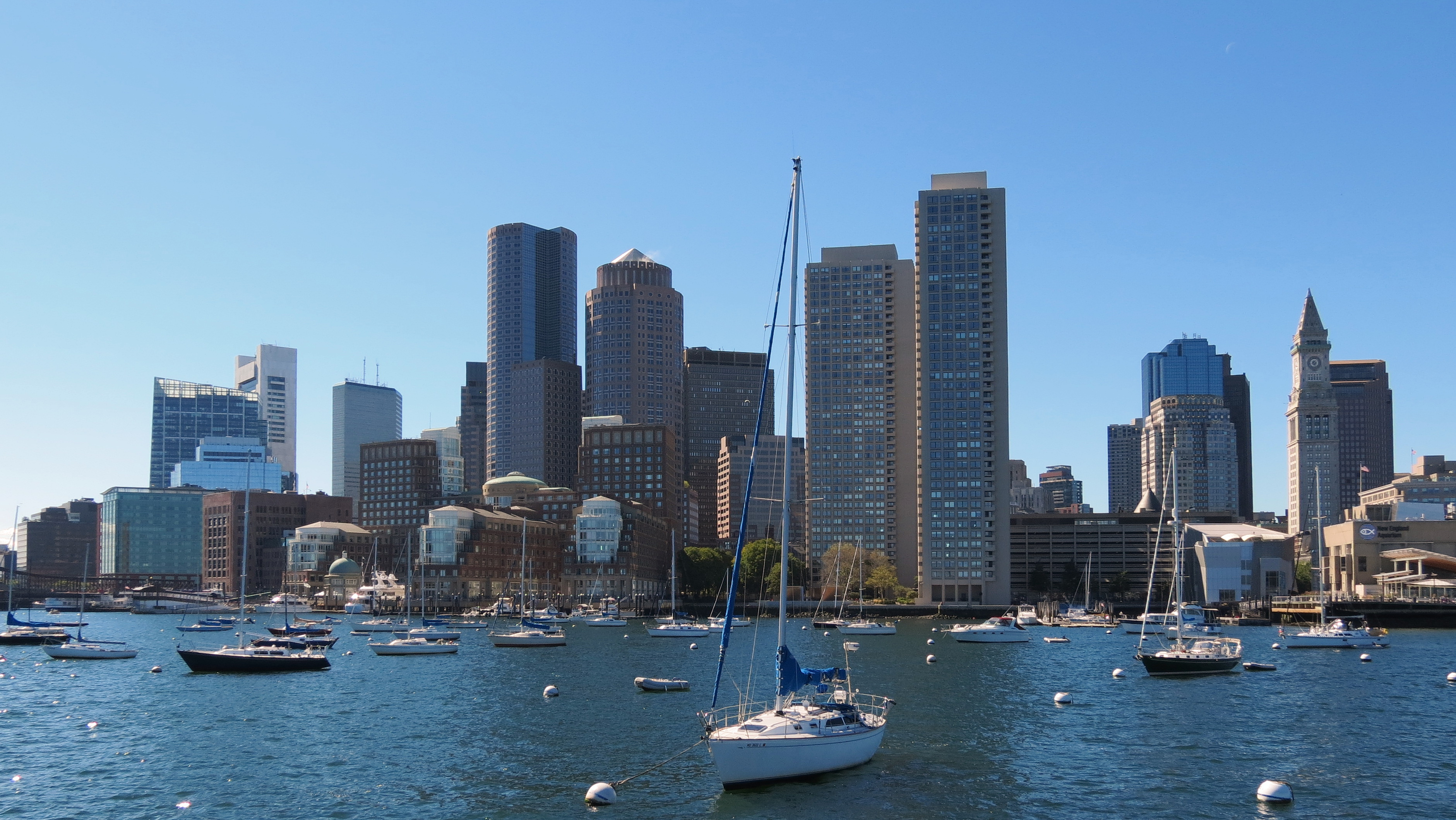
25. Boston, Massachusetts

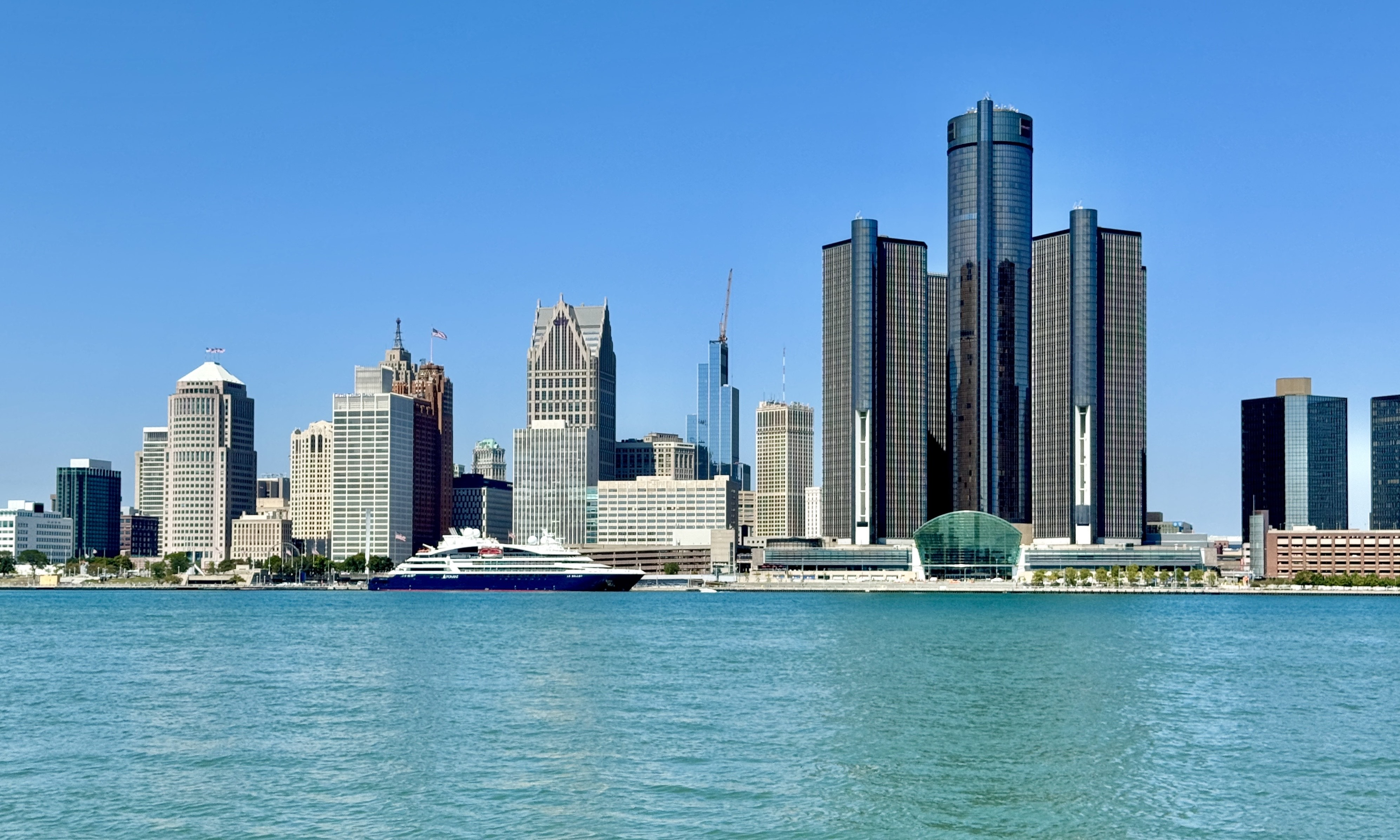
26. Detroit, Michigan

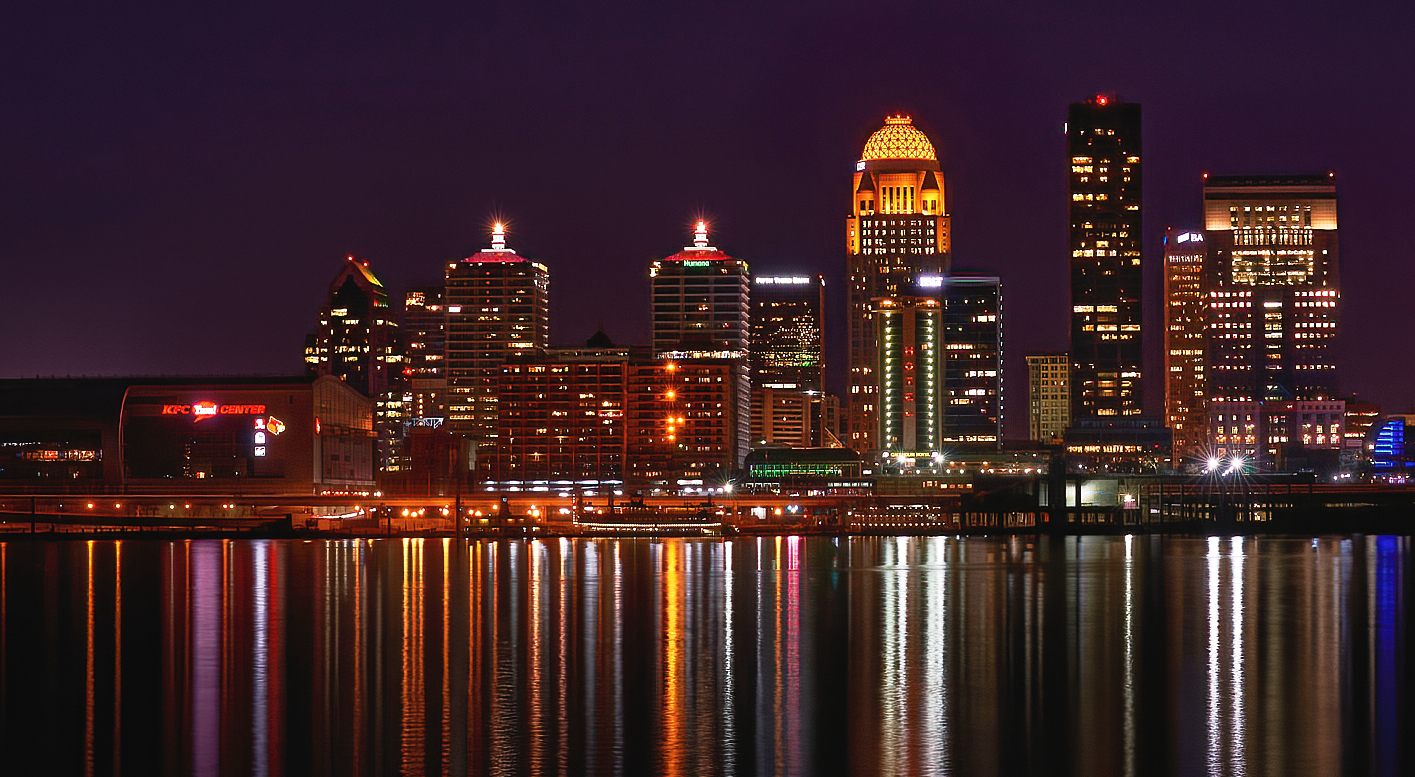
27. Louisville, Kentucky

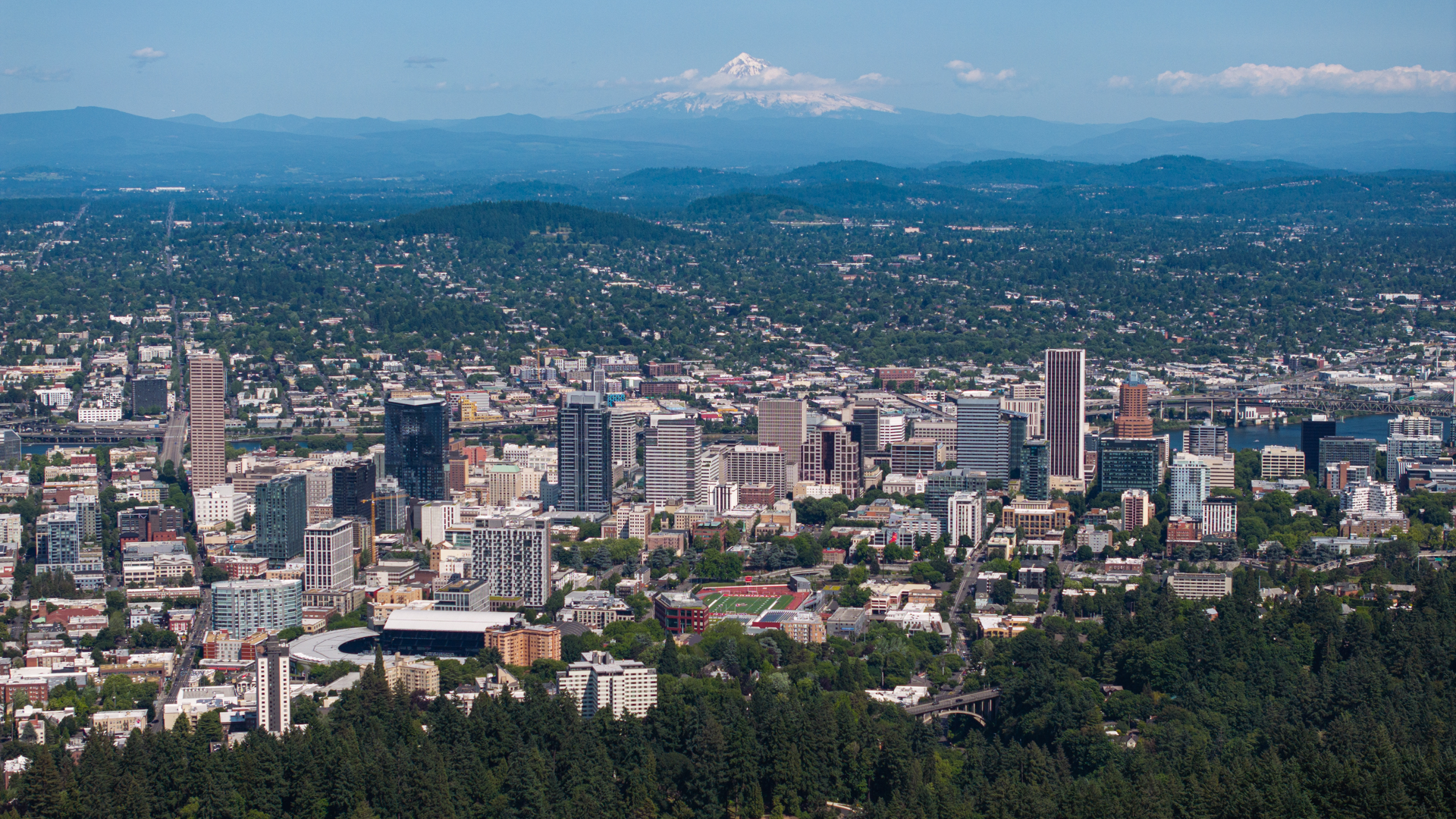
28. Portland, Oregon

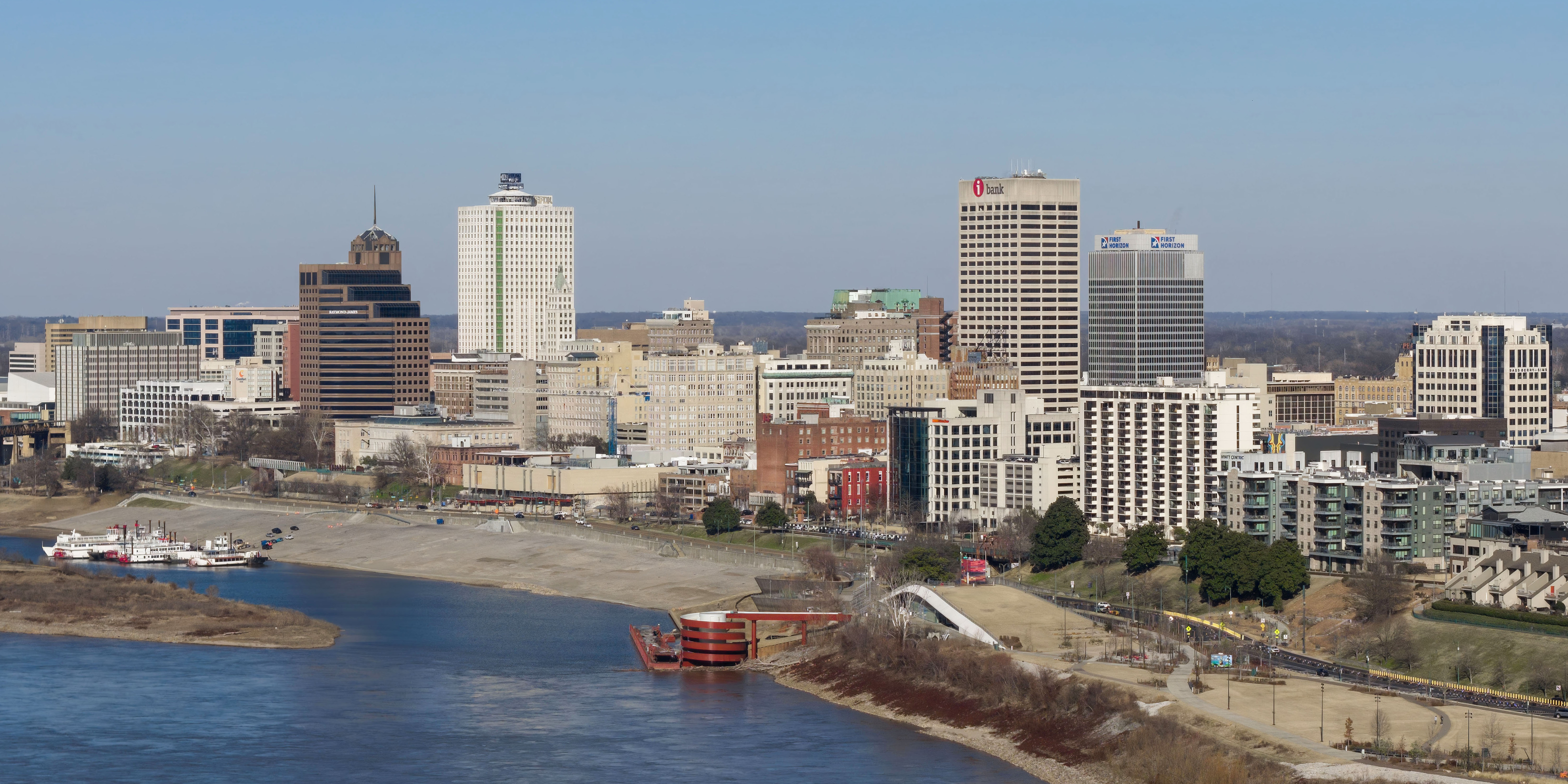
29. Memphis, Tennessee

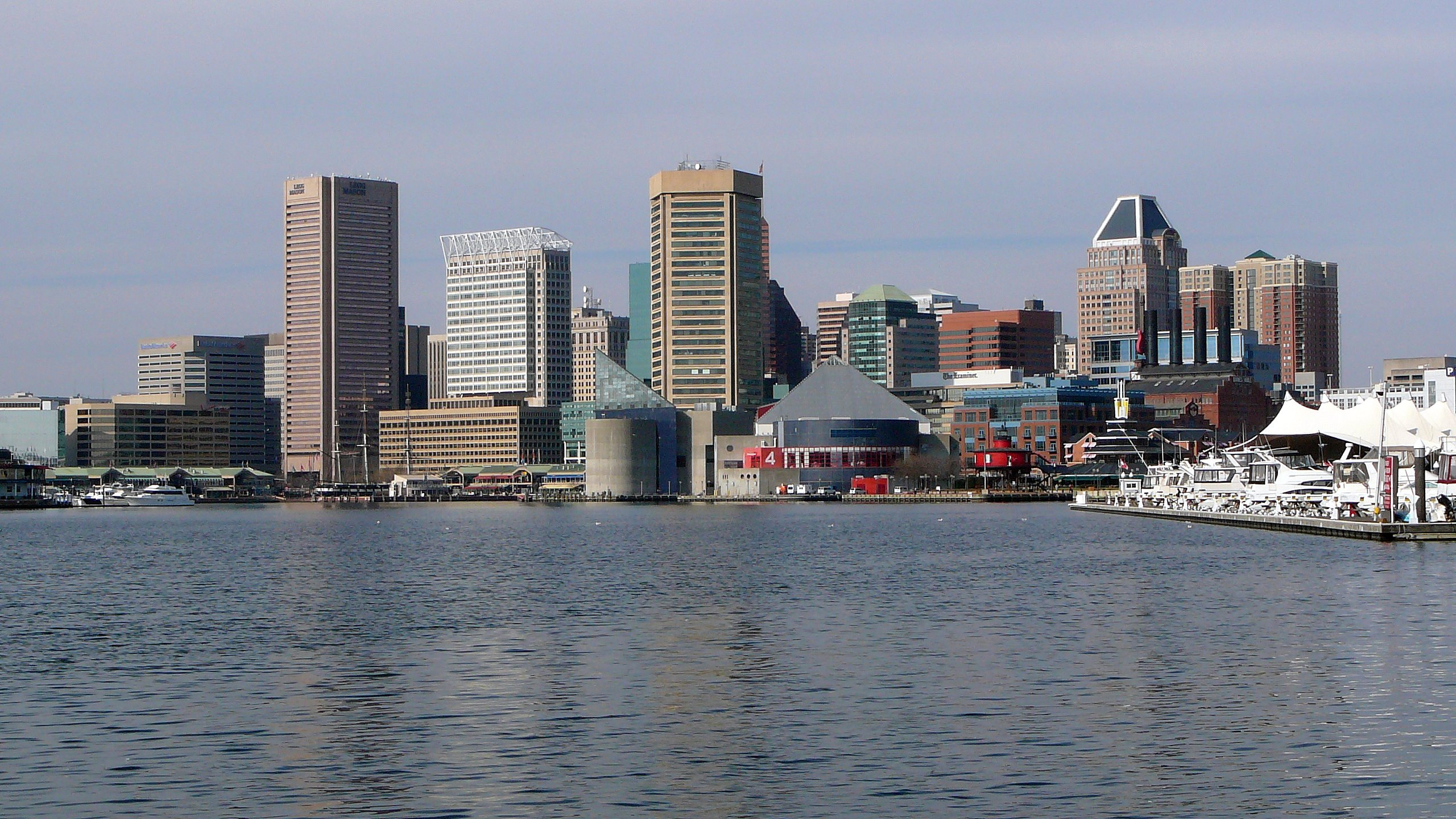
30. Baltimore, Maryland

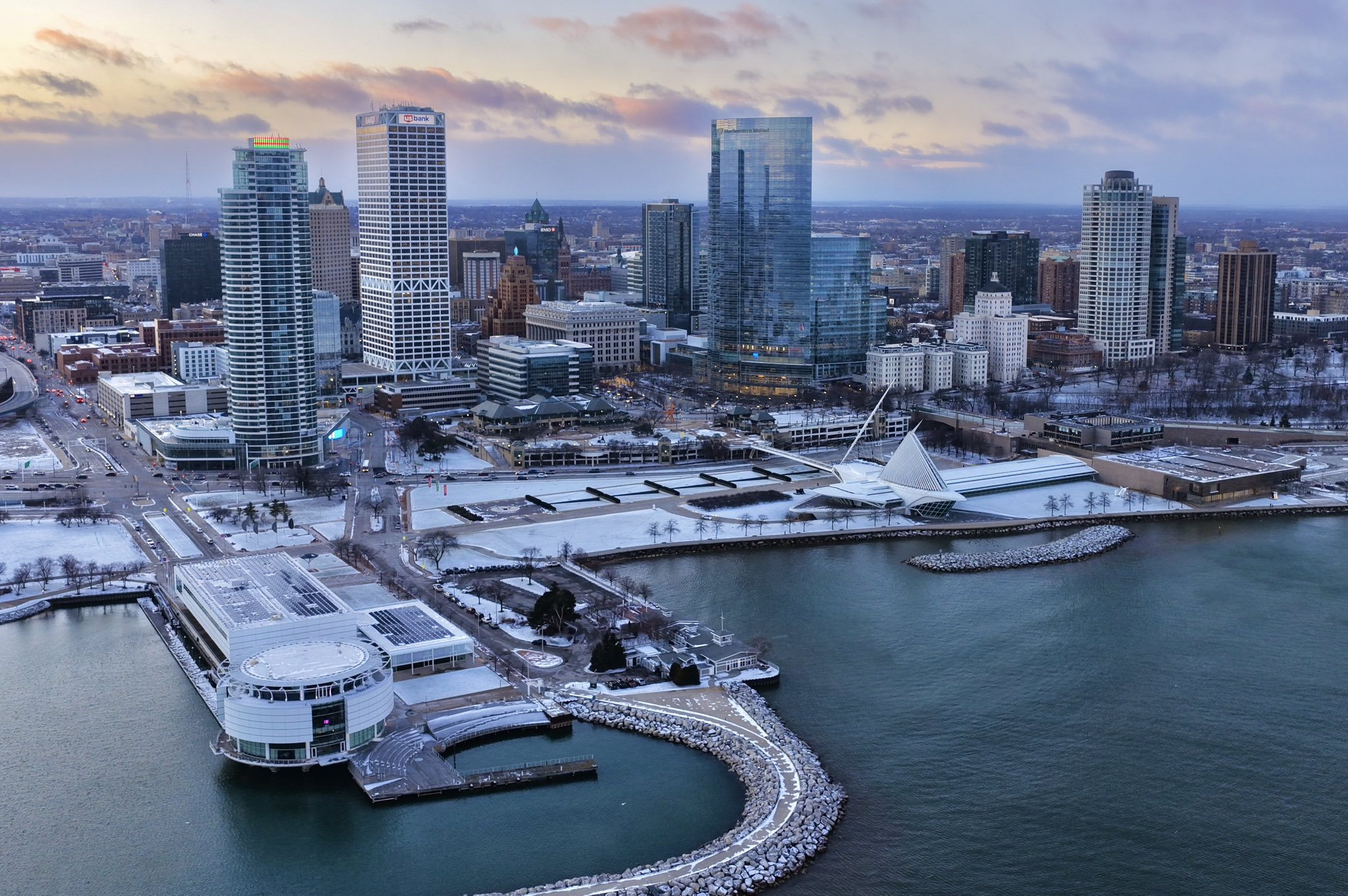
31. Milwaukee, Wisconsin

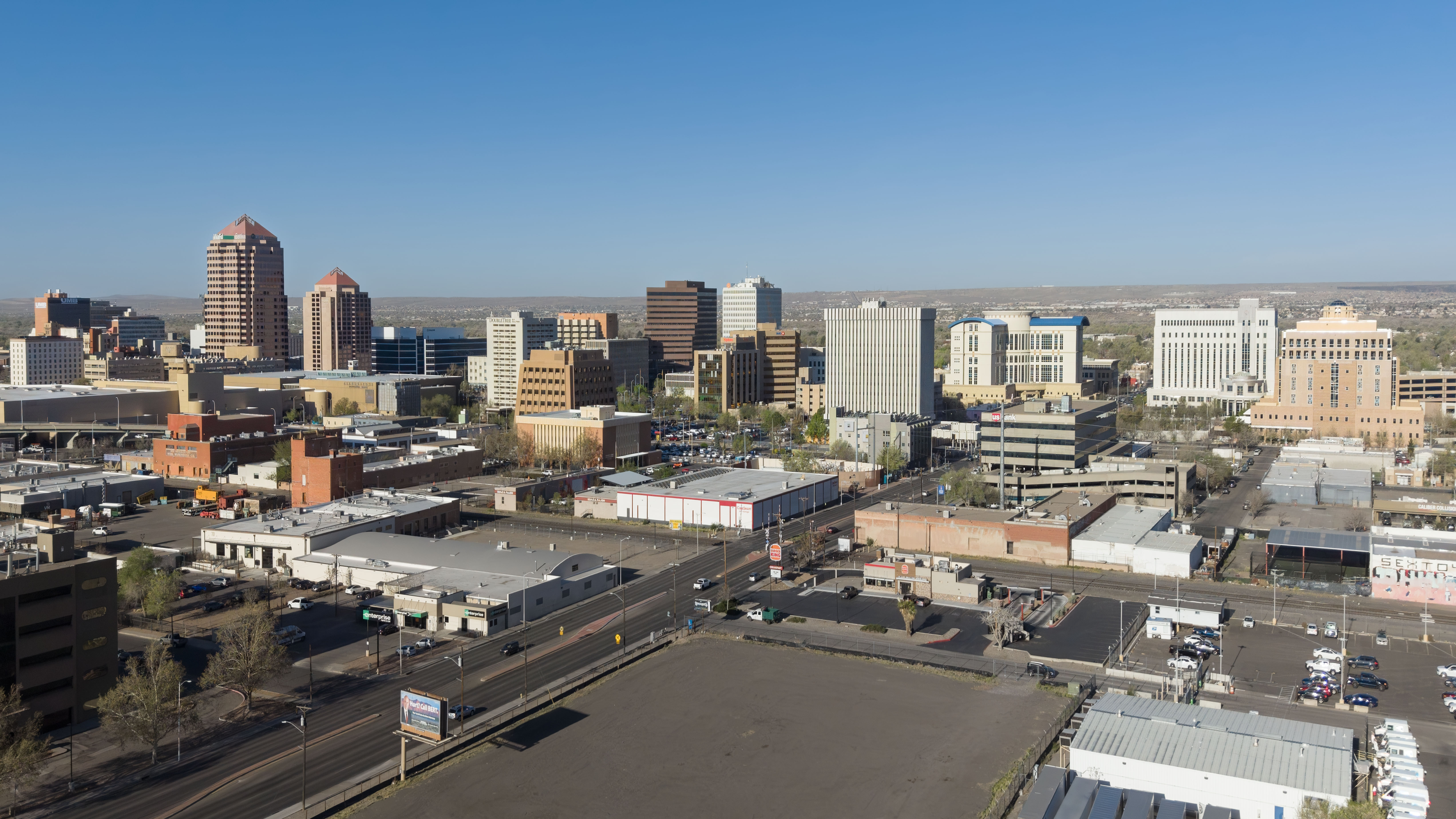
32. Albuquerque, New Mexico

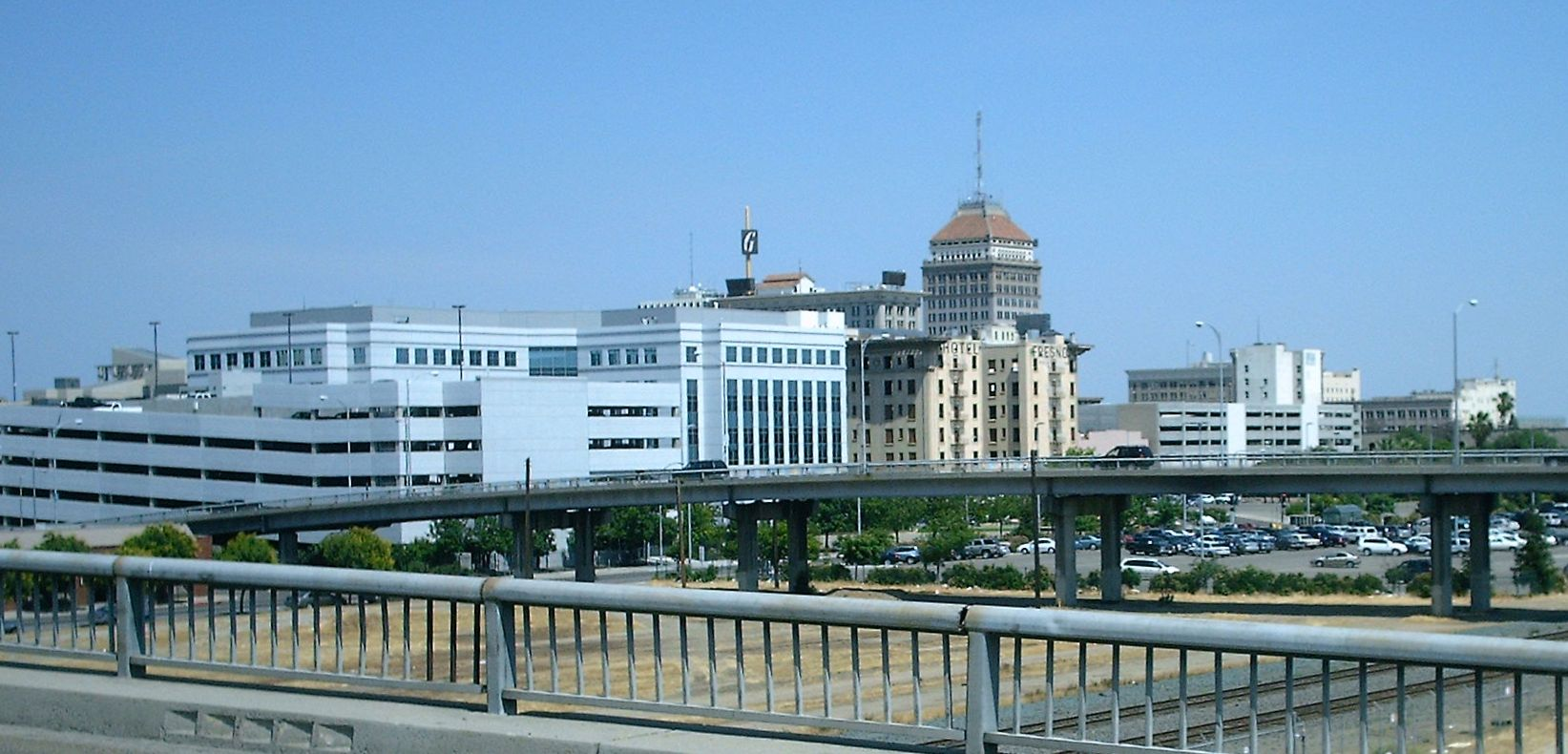
33. Fresno, California

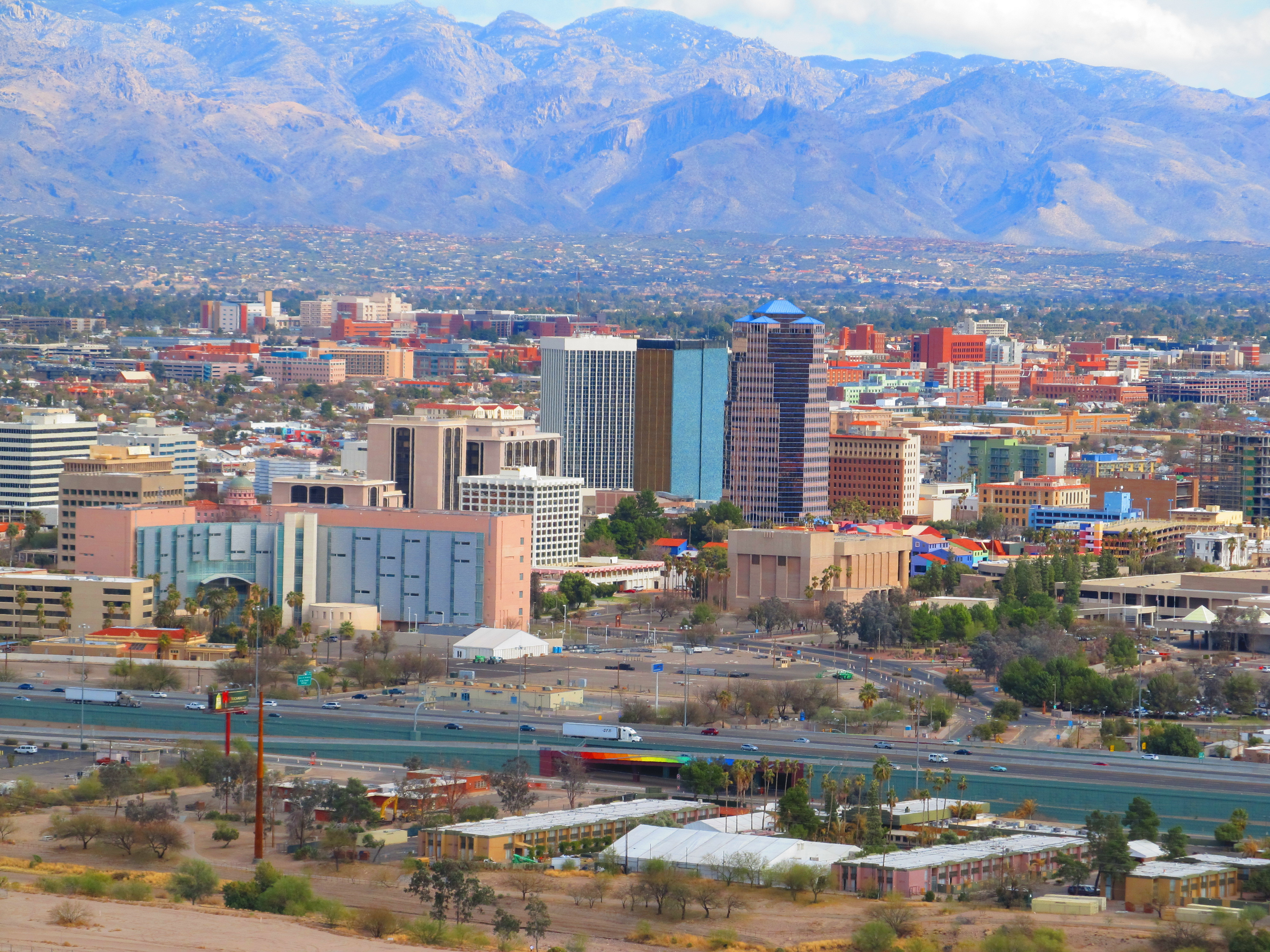
34. Tucson, Arizona

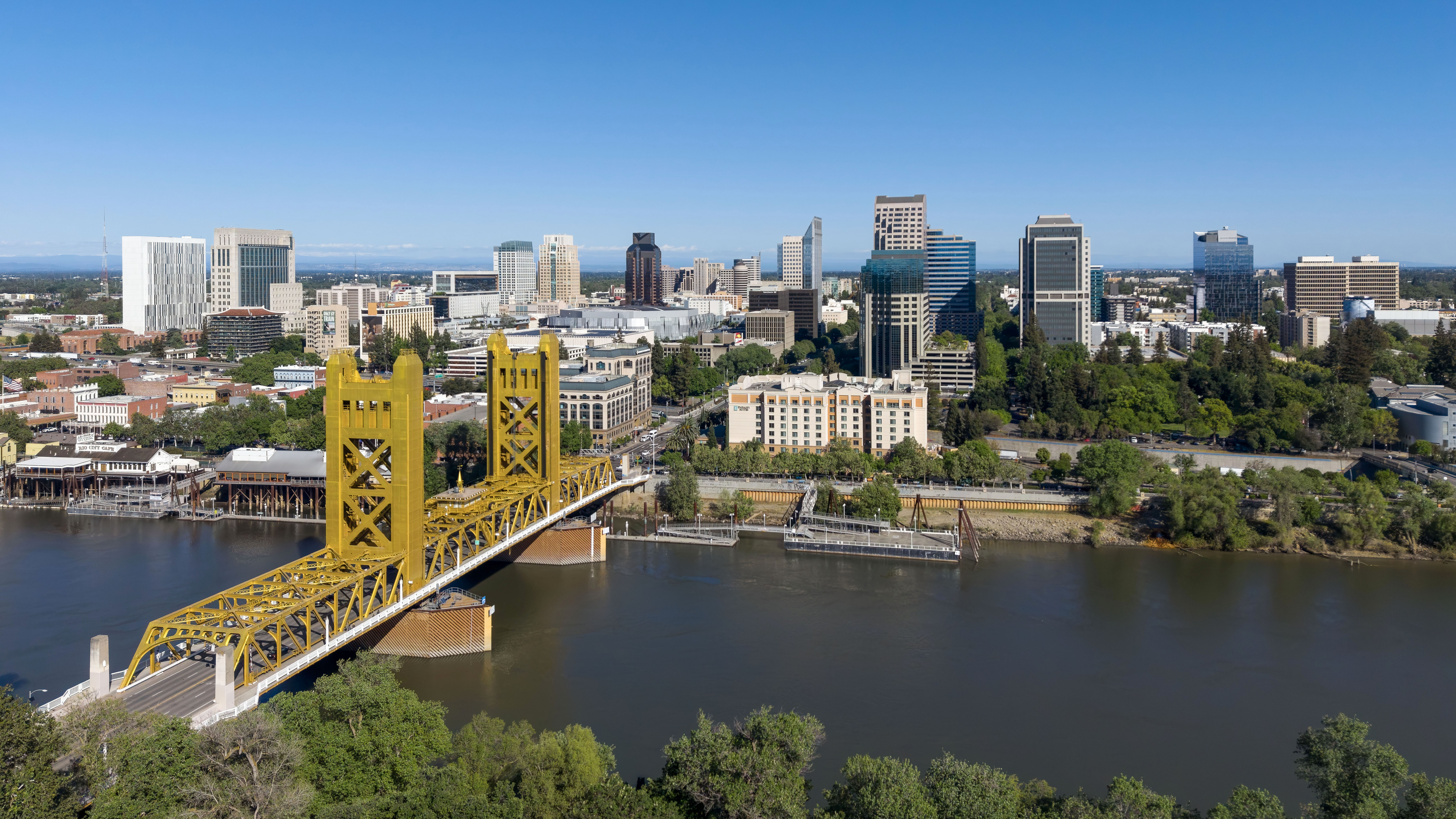
35. Sacramento, California

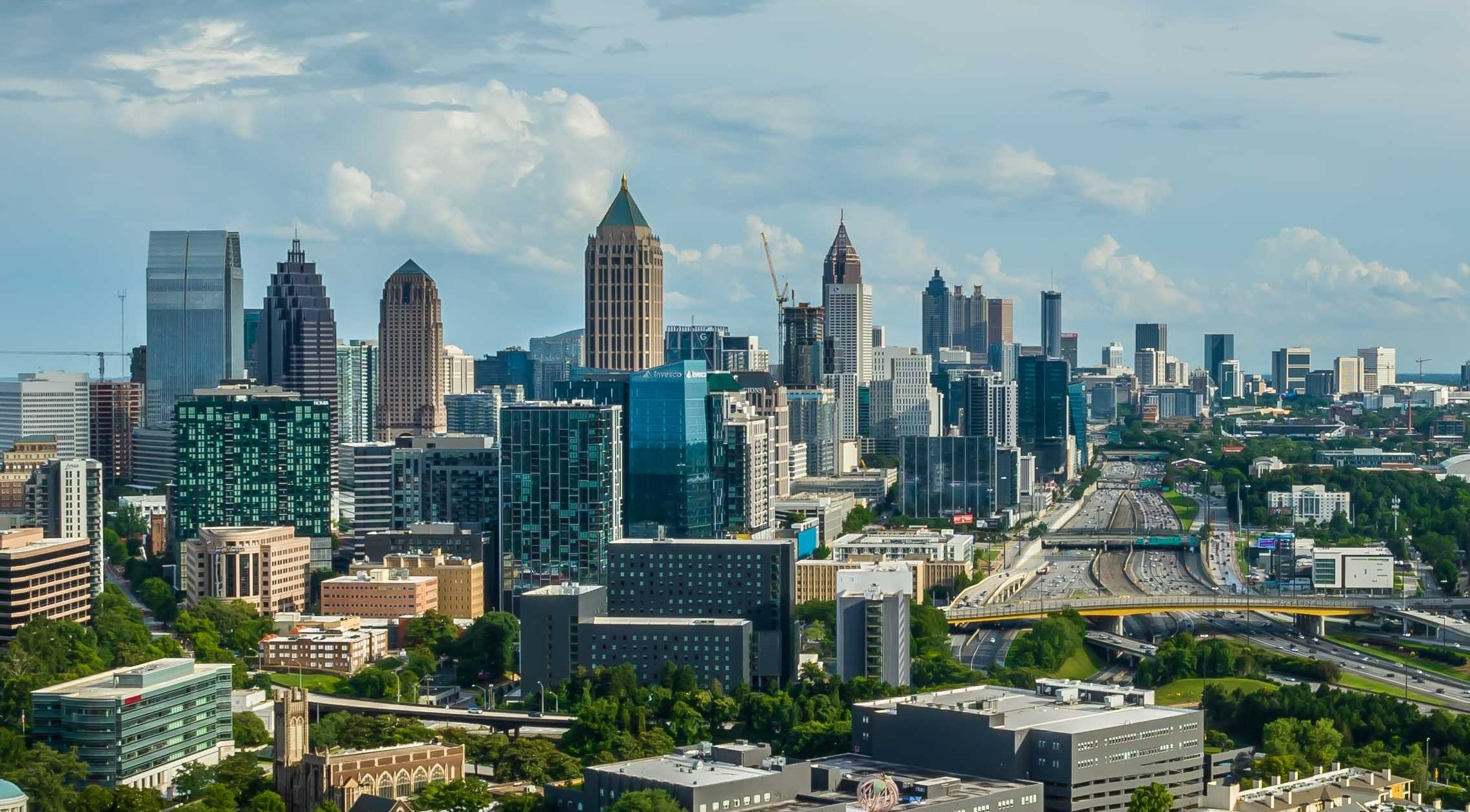
36. Atlanta, Georgia

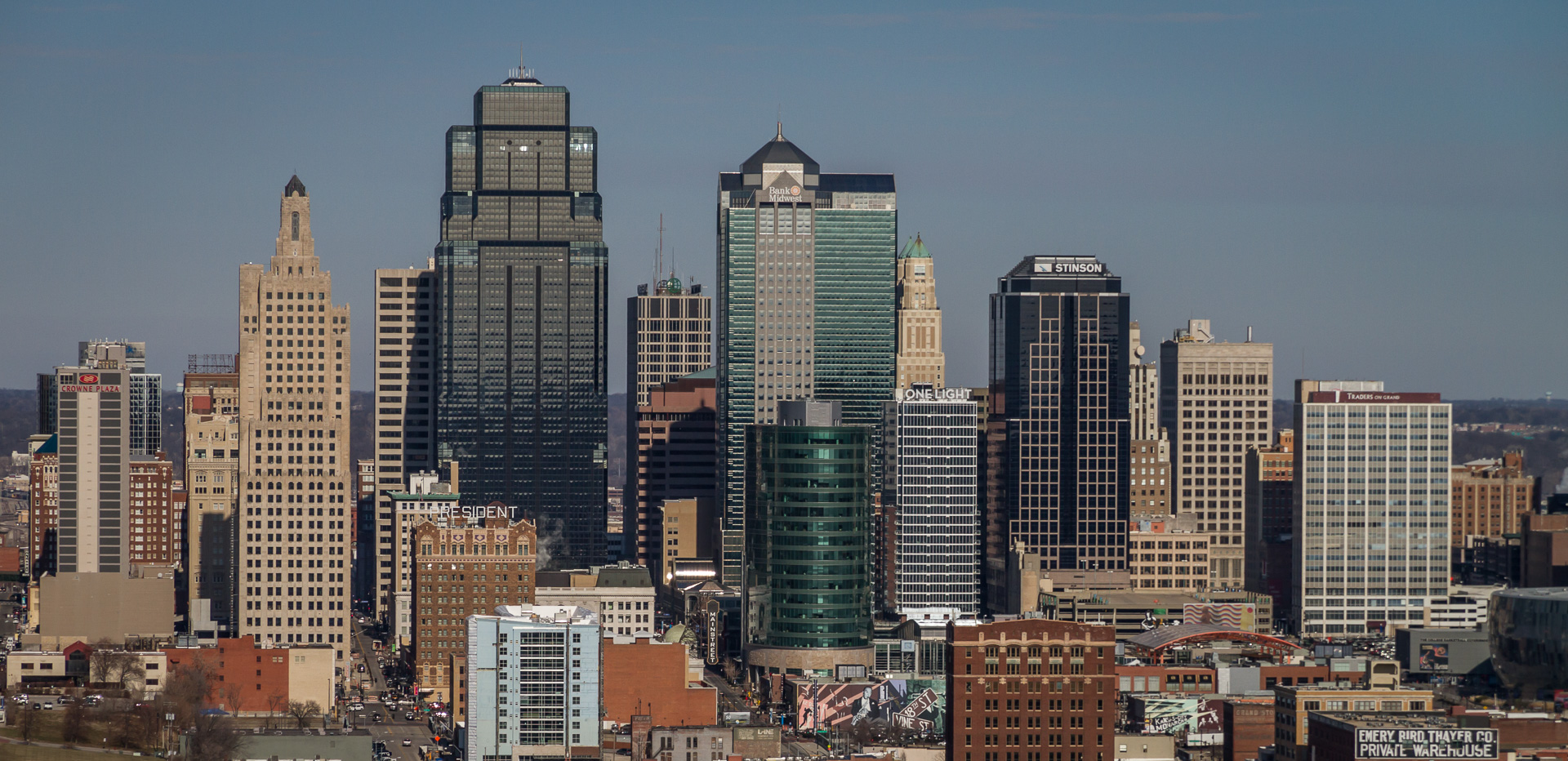
37. Kansas City, Missouri

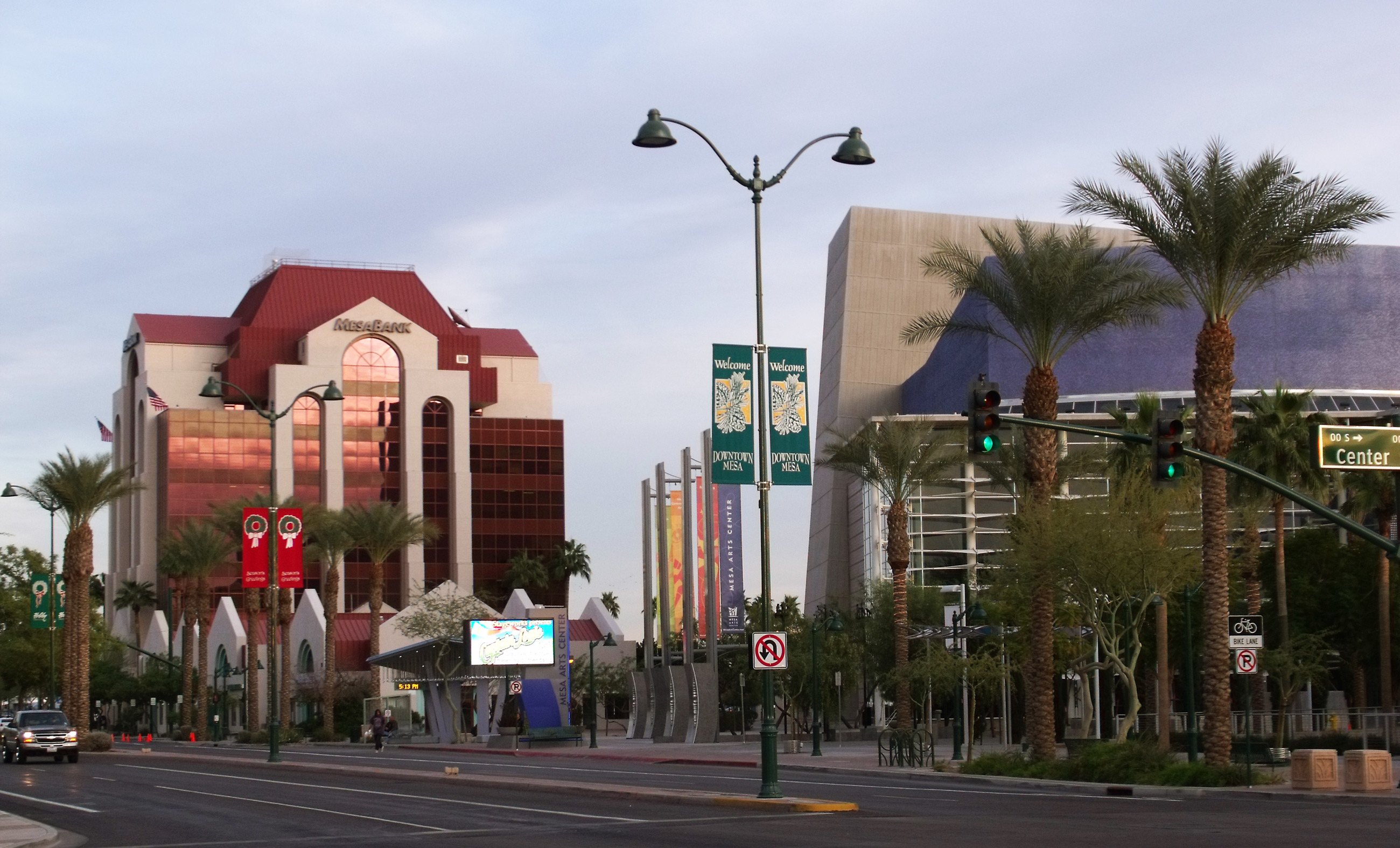
38. Mesa, Arizona

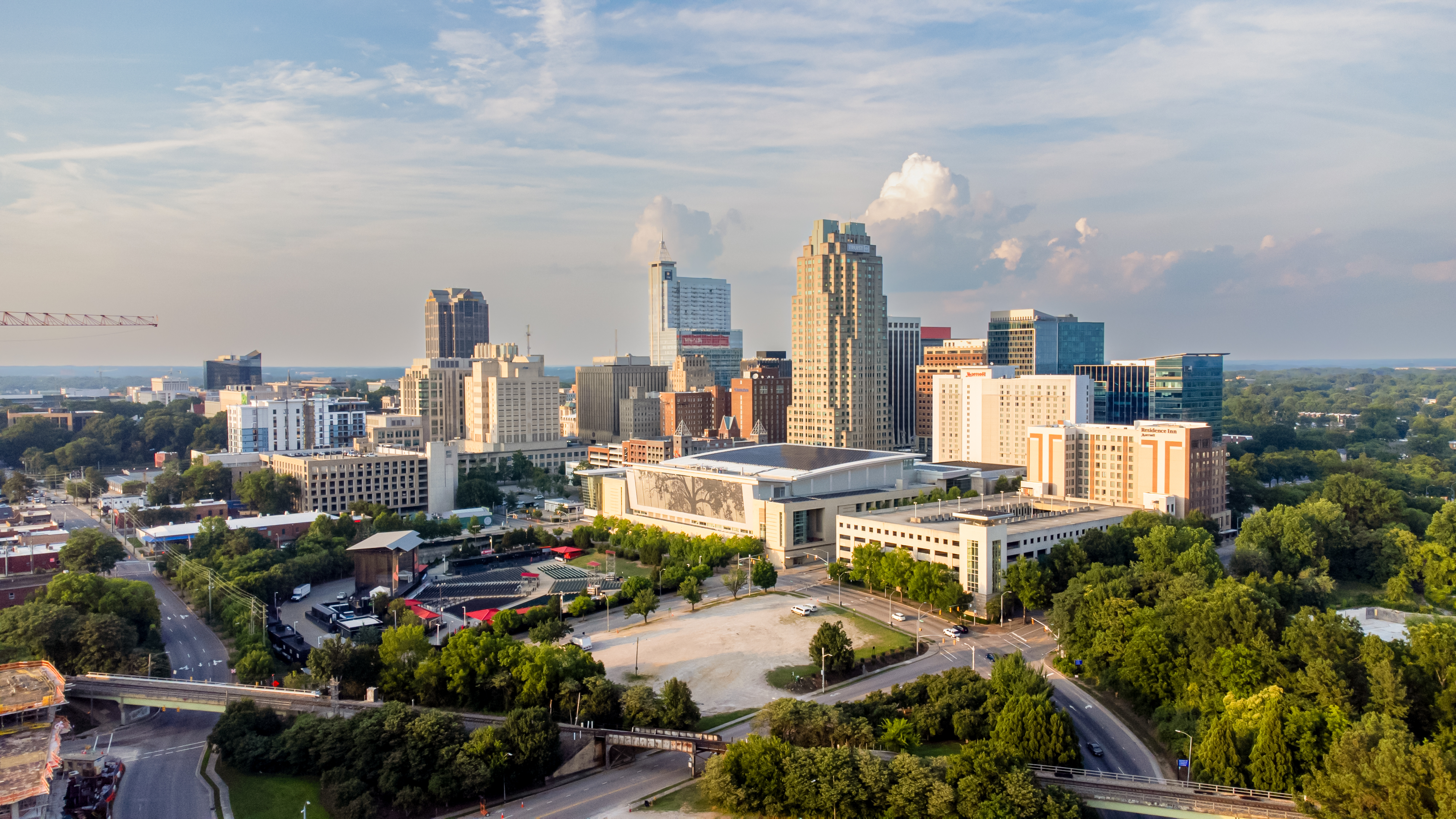
39. Raleigh, North Carolina

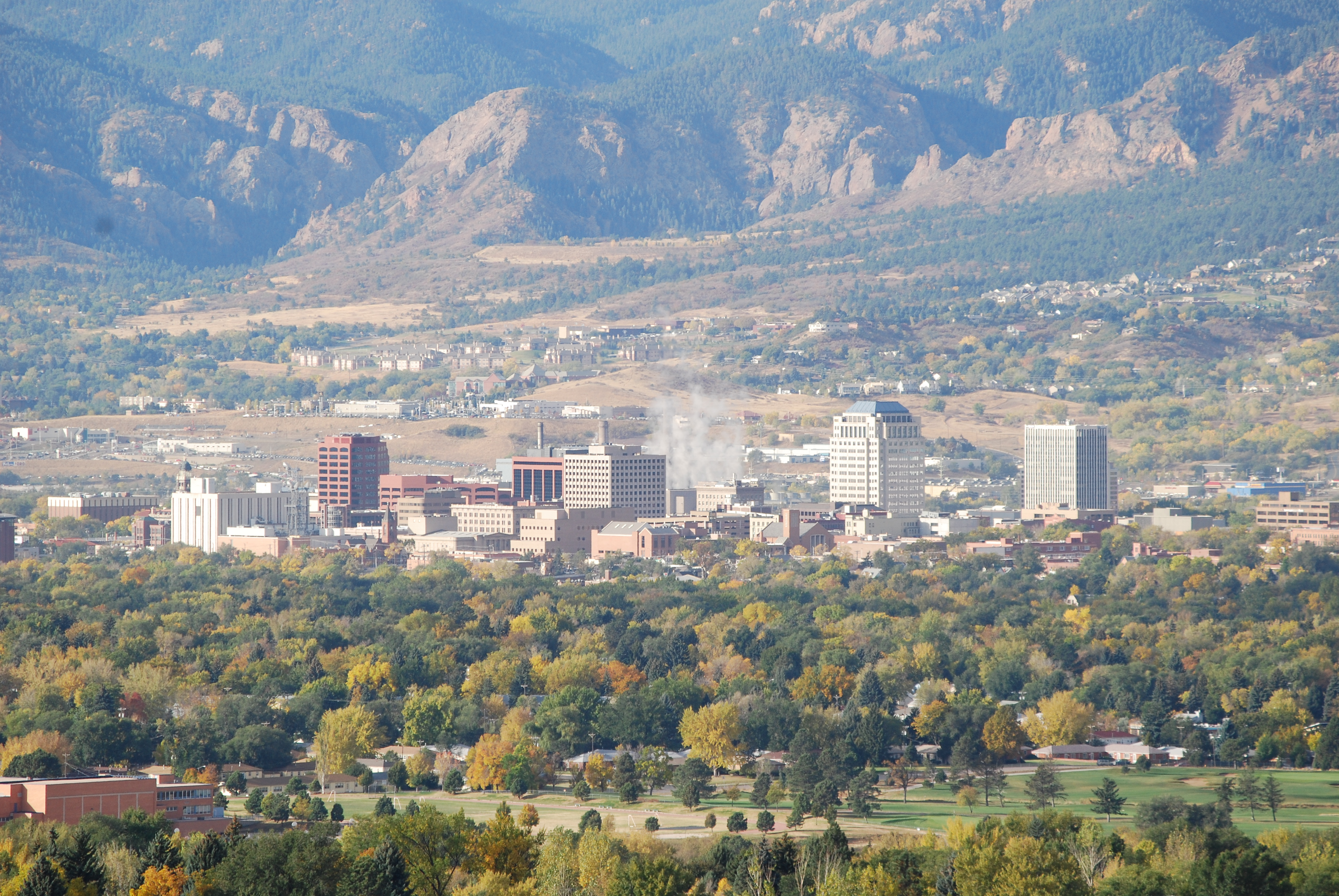
40. Colorado Springs, Colorado

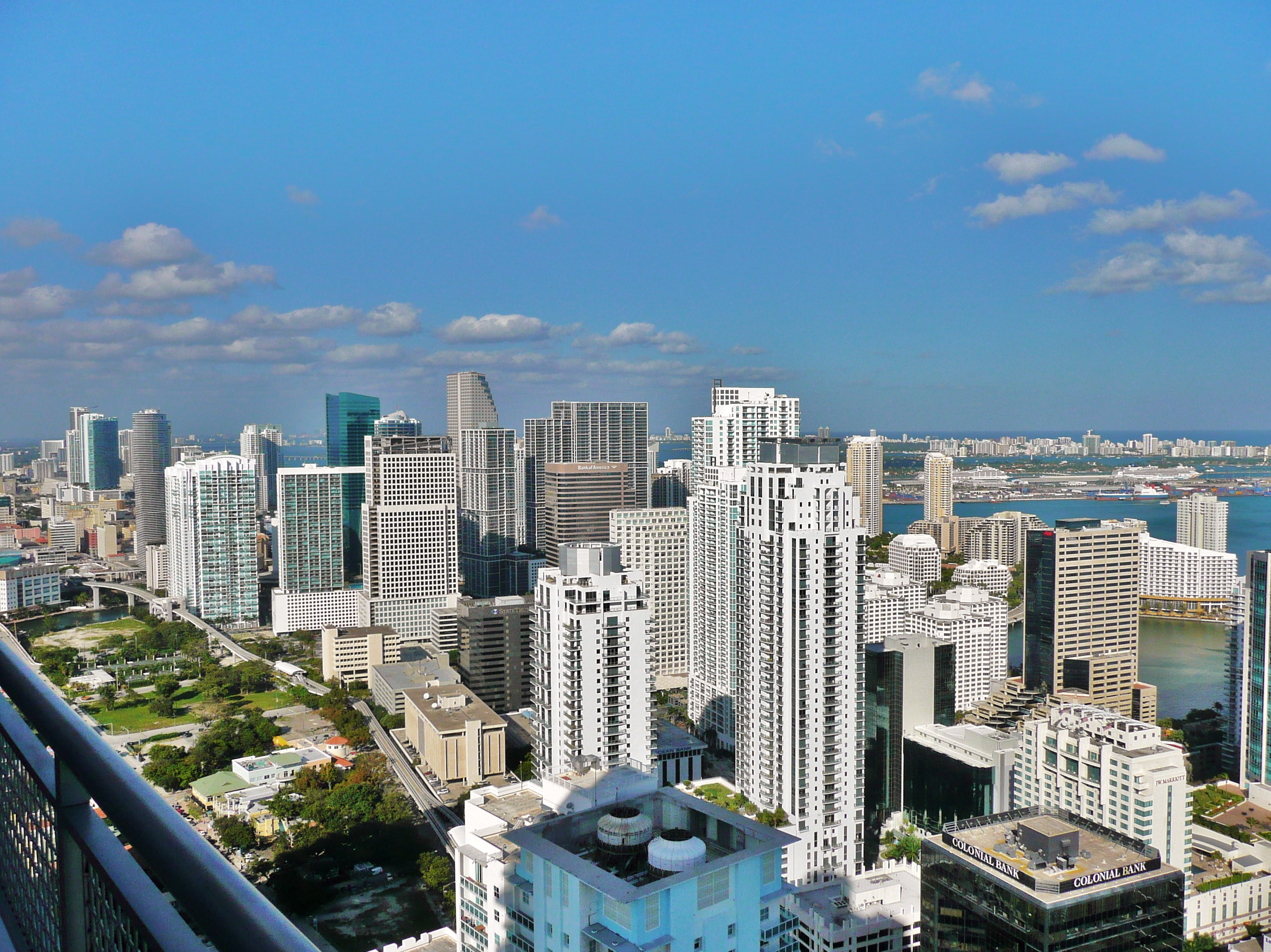
41. Miami, Florida

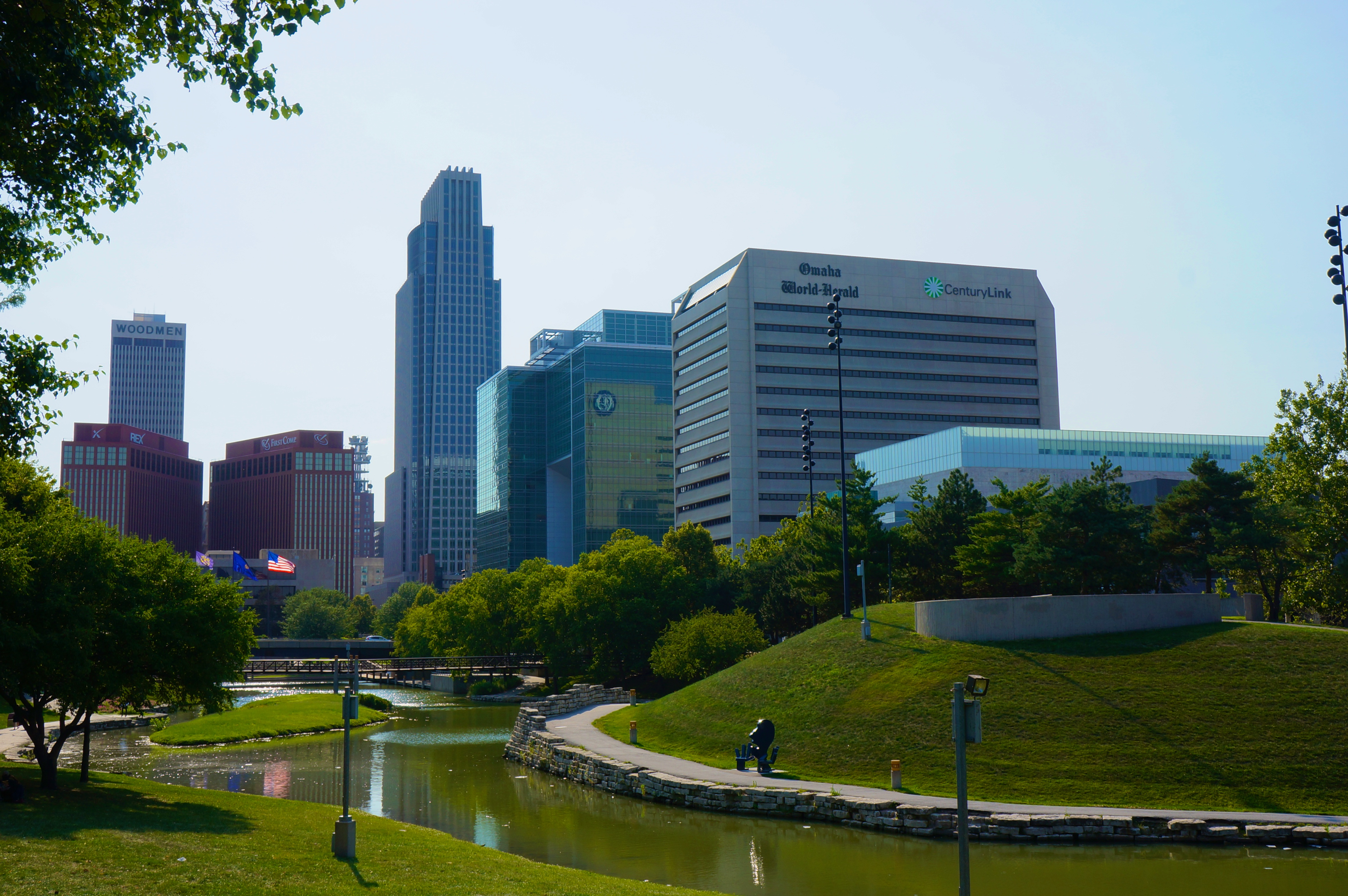
42. Omaha, Nebraska

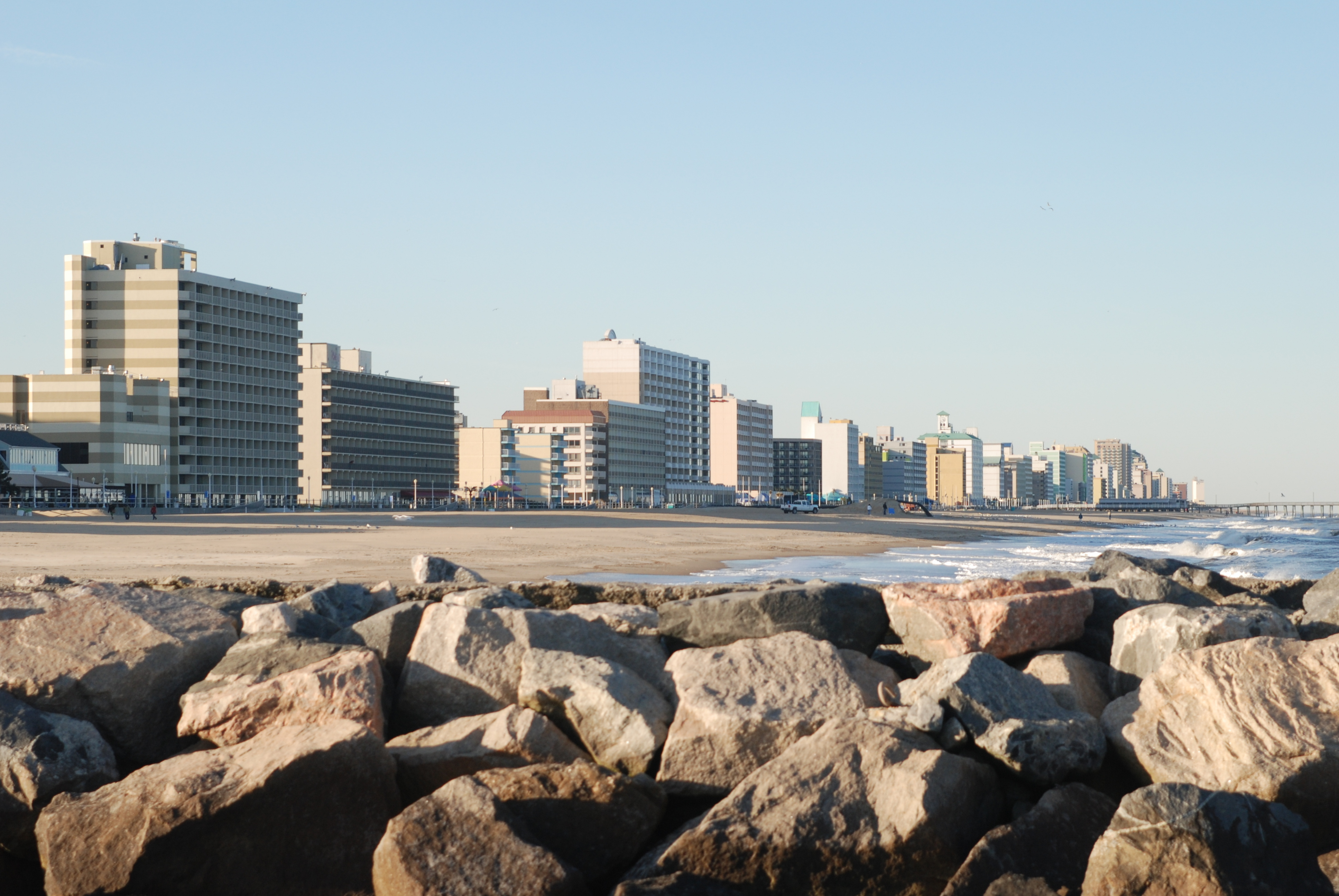
43. Virginia Beach, Virginia

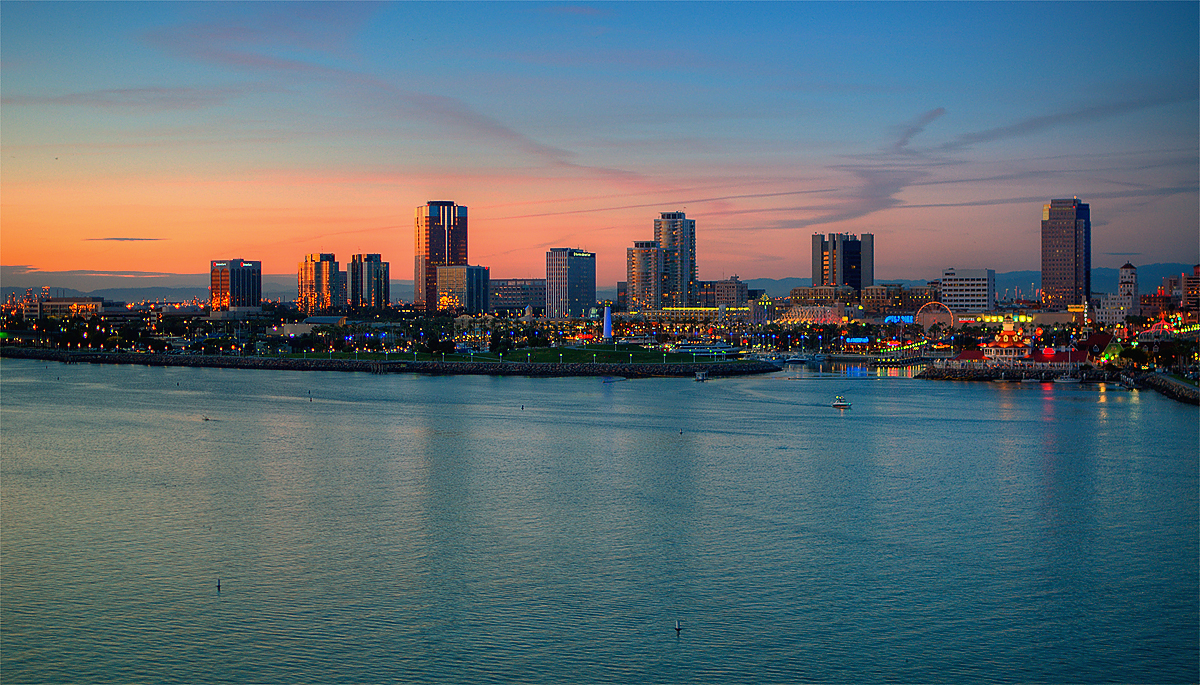
44. Long Beach, California

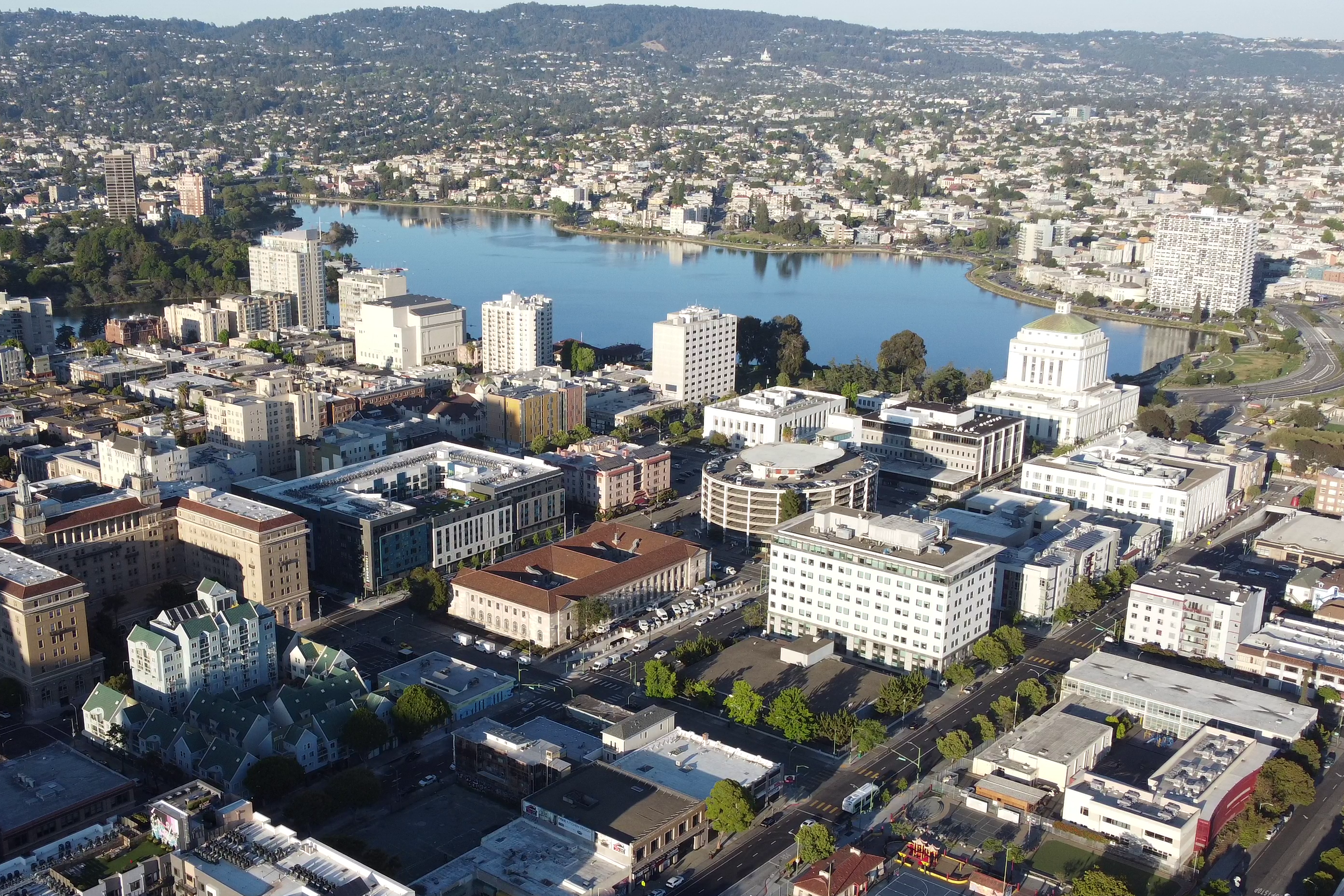
45. Oakland, California

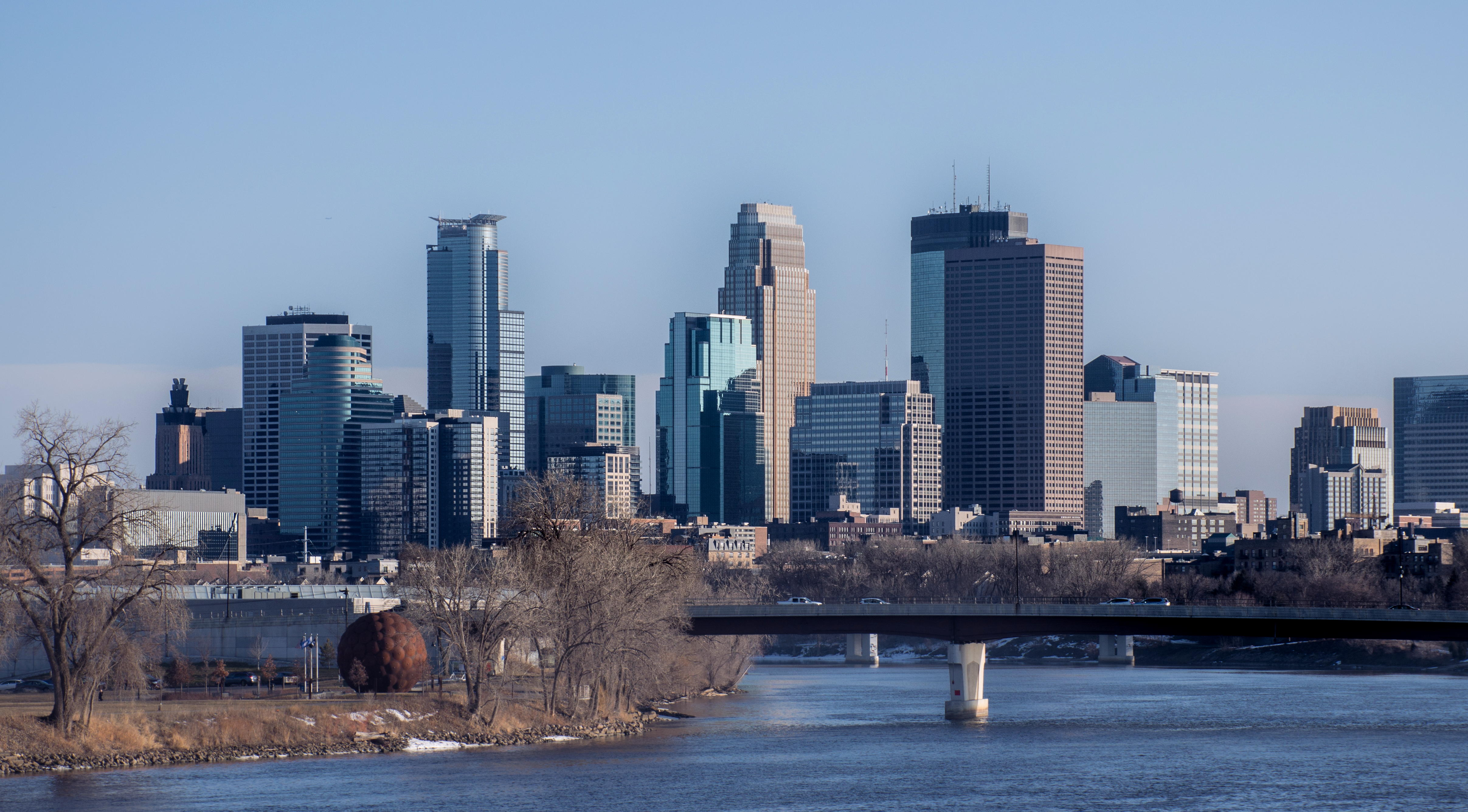
46. Minneapolis, Minnesota

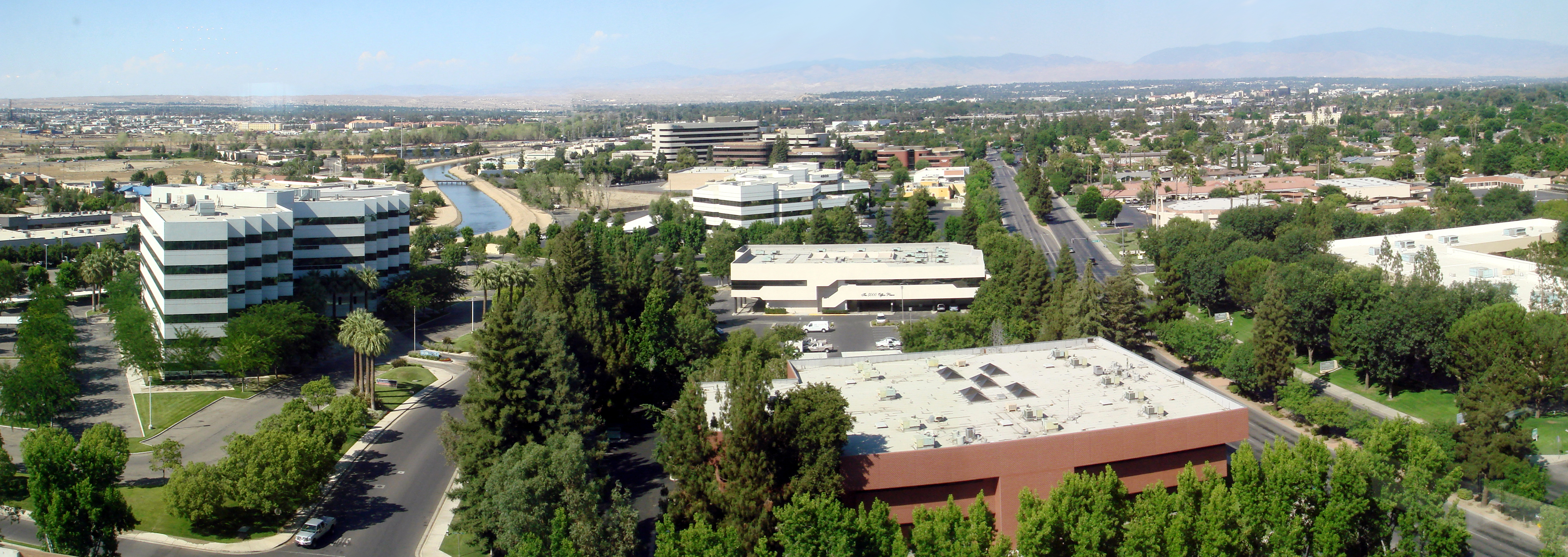
47. Bakersfield, California

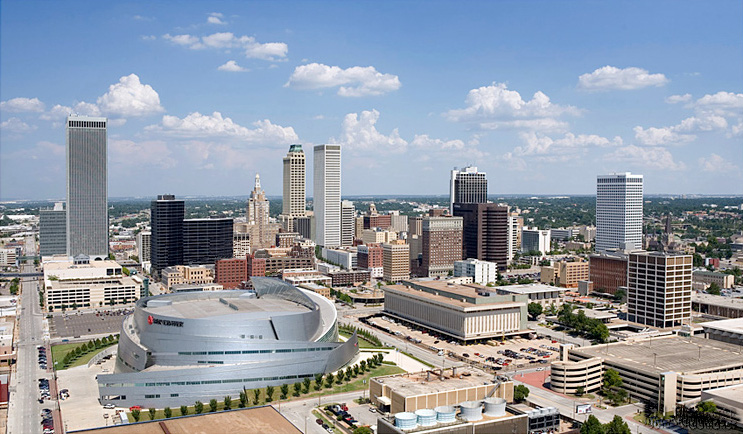
48. Tulsa, Oklahoma

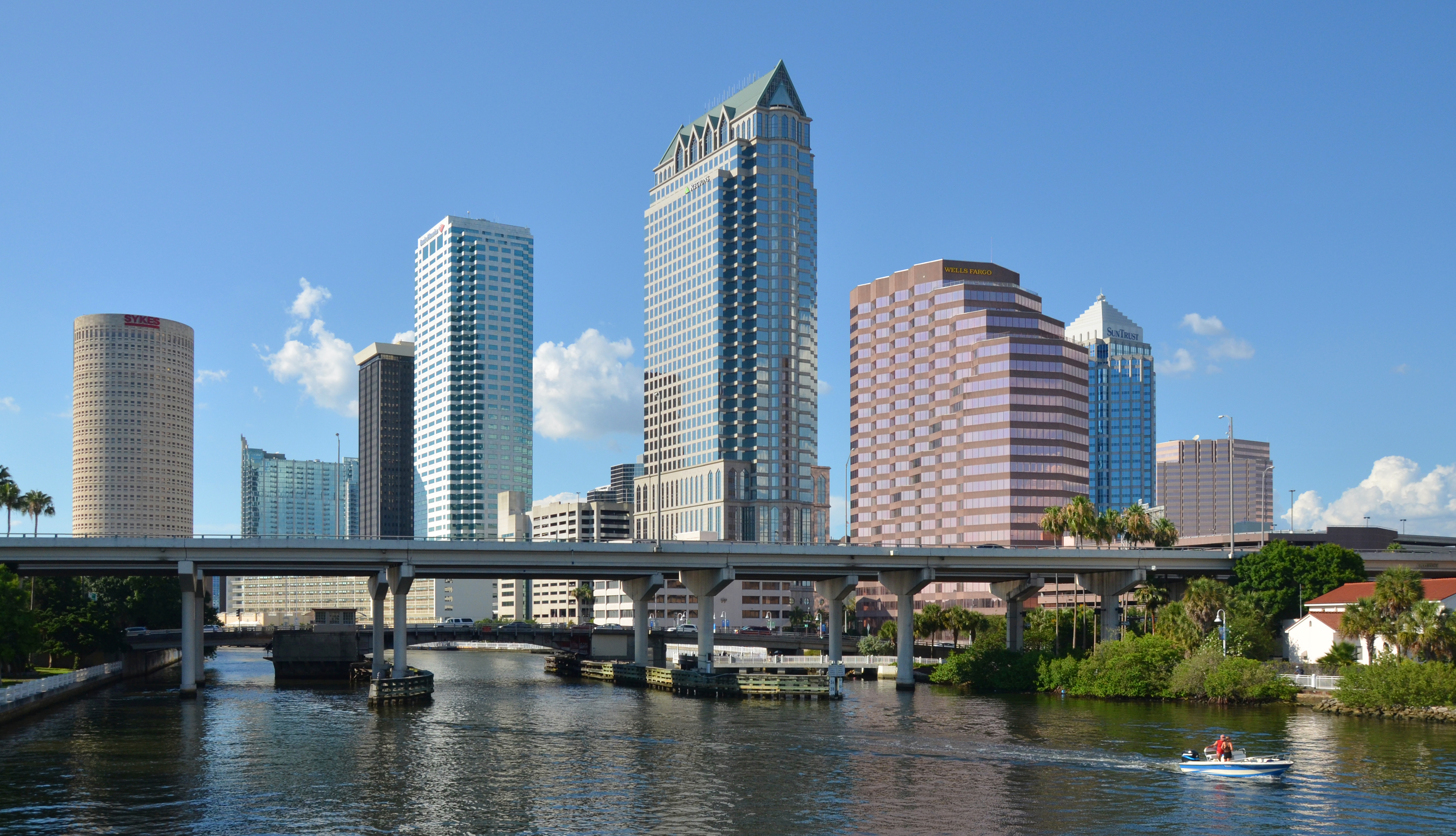
49. Tampa, Florida

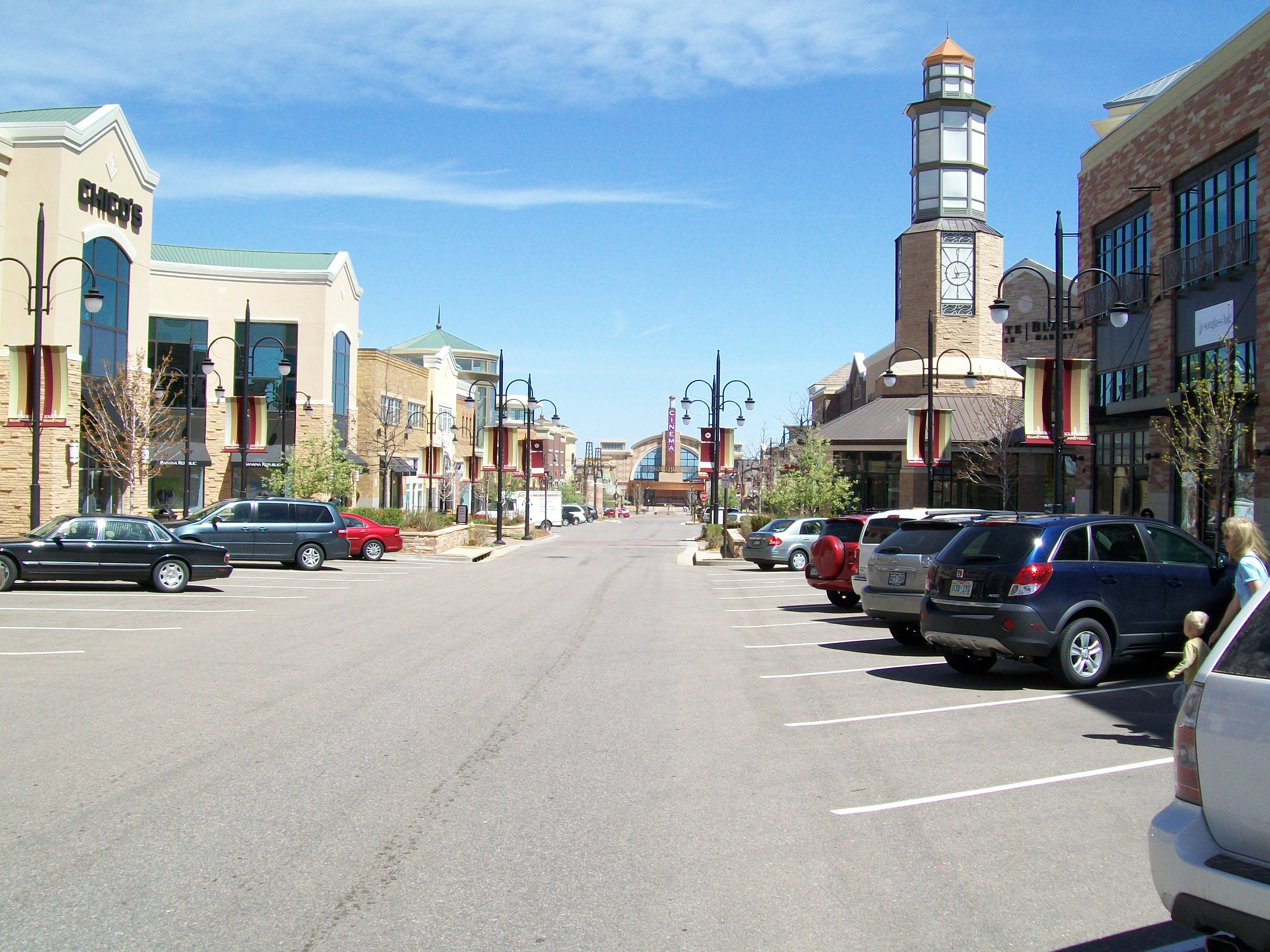
50. Aurora, Colorado

== Puerto Rico ==
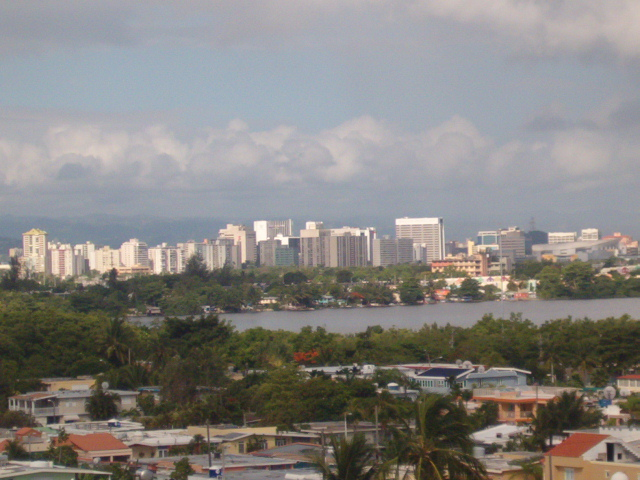
1. San Juan, Puerto Rico

The following table lists the five municipalities (municipios) of Puerto Rico with a population greater than 100,000 on July 1, 2024, as estimated by the United States Census Bureau. If Puerto Rican cities were included among the broader U.S. list, San Juan would rank as the 58th largest city in the country.

The table below contains the following information:

1. The municipality rank by population as of July 1, 2025, as estimated by the United States Census Bureau
2. The municipality
3. The municipality population as of July 1, 2025, as estimated by the United States Census Bureau
4. The municipality population as of April 1, 2020, as enumerated by the 2020 United States census
5. The municipality percent population change from April 1, 2020, to July 1, 2025
6. The municipality land area as of January 1, 2020
7. The municipality population density as of April 1, 2020 (residents per land area)
8. The municipality latitude and longitude coordinates

Municipio	2025 estimate	2020 census	Change	2020 land area		2020 density		Location
San Juan	329,737	342,259	−3.66%	39.8 sq mi	103.1 km^{2}	8,599/sq mi	3,320/km^{2}	18°24′N 66°04′W
Bayamón	180,562	185,187	−2.50%	27.0 sq mi	69.9 km^{2}	6,859/sq mi	2,648/km^{2}	18°23′N 66°10′W
Carolina	149,874	154,815	−3.19%	20.7 sq mi	53.6 km^{2}	7,479/sq mi	2,888/km^{2}	18°25′N 65°59′W
Ponce	128,384	137,491	−6.62%	28.4 sq mi	73.6 km^{2}	4,841/sq mi	1,869/km^{2}	18°00′N 66°37′W
Caguas	124,161	127,244	−2.42%	10.9 sq mi	28.2 km^{2}	11,674/sq mi	4,507/km^{2}	18°14′N 66°02′W

== Other U.S. territories ==
The other U.S. territories — American Samoa, Guam, the Northern Mariana Islands, and the U.S. Virgin Islands — have no cities with at least 100,000 people.

== Census-designated places ==
The following table lists U.S. census-designated places (CDPs) with populations of at least 100,000 according to the 2020 census. A CDP is a concentration of population identified by the United States Census Bureau for statistical purposes. CDPs are delineated for each decennial census as the statistical counterparts of incorporated places such as cities, towns and villages. CDPs are populated areas that lack separate municipal government, but which otherwise physically resemble incorporated places. Unlike the incorporated cities in the main list, the US Census Bureau does not release annual population estimates for CDPs.

The table below contains the following information:

1. The census-designated place
2. The state
3. The census-designated place population as of April 1, 2020, as enumerated by the 2020 United States census
4. The census-designated place population as of April 1, 2010, as enumerated by the 2010 United States census
5. The census-designated place percent population change from April 1, 2010, to April 1, 2020
6. The census-designated place land area as of January 1, 2020
7. The census-designated place population density as of April 1, 2020 (residents per land area)
8. The census-designated place latitude and longitude coordinates

Census- designated place	ST	2020 census	2010 census	Change	2020 land area		2020 density		Location
Census- designated place	ST	2020 census	2010 census	Change	mi^{2}	km^{2}	/ mi^{2}	/ km^{2}	Location
Arlington	VA	238,643	207,627	+14.94%	26.0	67.340	9,179	3,544	38°53′N 77°06′W
Enterprise	NV	221,831	108,481	+104.49%	66.0	170.939	3,361	1,298	36°01′N 115°14′W
Spring Valley	NV	215,597	178,395	+20.85%	35.5	91.945	6,073	2,345	36°06′N 115°16′W
Sunrise Manor	NV	205,618	189,372	+8.58%	33.7	87.283	6,101	2,356	36°11′N 115°03′W
Paradise	NV	191,238	223,167	−14.31%	42.4	109.815	4,510	1,740	36°05′N 115°08′W
Metairie	LA	143,507	138,481	+3.63%	23.3	60.347	6,159	2,378	30°00′N 90°11′W
East Los Angeles	CA	118,786	126,496	−6.10%	7.5	19.425	15,838	6,115	34°02′N 118°10′W
Brandon	FL	114,626	103,483	+10.77%	33.1	85.729	3,463	1,337	27°56′N 82°18′W
The Woodlands	TX	114,436	93,847	+21.94%	43.3	112.146	2,643	1,020	30°10′N 95°31′W
Lehigh Acres	FL	114,287	86,784	+31.69%	92.7	240.092	1,233	476	26°37′N 81°38′W
Spring Hill	FL	113,568	98,621	+15.16%	59.9	155.140	1,896	732	28°29′N 82°32′W
Riverview	FL	107,396	71,050	+51.16%	46.2	119.657	2,325	898	27°49′N 82°18′W
Columbia	MD	104,681	99,615	+5.09%	31.9	82.621	3,282	1,267	39°12′N 76°52′W
Highlands Ranch	CO	103,444	96,713	+6.96%	24.3	62.937	4,257	1,644	39°32′N 104°58′W

== Cities formerly over 100,000 people ==
The following table lists U.S. cities that, in past censuses, have had populations of at least 100,000 but have since decreased beneath this threshold or have been consolidated with or annexed into a neighboring city.

City	ST	2025 estimate	Peak population	% decline from peak	Peak year	
Allegheny	PA	NA	129,896	NA	1907	(Note: Peak as an independent city, annexed by Pittsburgh in 1907. In the 2010 census, the population of all neighborhoods of Pittsburgh that were formerly part of Allegheny City totalled 43,421. All North Side neighborhoods of Pittsburgh (41,120), plus an additional 2,301 in Census Tract 4270 Blocks 2 & 3, which are the sections of Millvale, Pennsylvania that were formerly part of Allegheny City.)
Brooklyn	NY	NA	806,343	NA	1898	(Note: Peak as an independent city, consolidated with New York City in 1898. The estimated 2025 population for Brooklyn was 2,653,963.)
Camden	NJ	71,430	124,555	−42.65%	1950	
Canton	OH	69,001	116,912	−40.98%	1950	
Citrus Heights	CA	86,348	107,439	−19.63%	1990	
Duluth	MN	88,330	107,312	−17.69%	1960	
Erie	PA	91,838	138,440	−33.66%	1960	
Fall River	MA	95,298	120,485	−20.90%	1920	
Federal Way	WA	99,729	101,030	−1.29%	2020	
Flint	MI	79,306	196,940	−59.73%	1960	
Gary	IN	67,289	178,320	−62.27%	1960	
Hammond	IN	75,712	111,698	−32.22%	1960	
Livonia	MI	92,603	110,109	−15.90%	1970	
Niagara Falls	NY	47,255	102,394	−53.85%	1960	
Norwalk	CA	97,104	105,549	−8.00%	2010	
Parma	OH	78,581	100,216	−21.59%	1970	
Portsmouth	VA	96,777	114,773	−15.68%	1960	
Reading	PA	95,832	111,171	−13.80%	1930	
Roanoke	VA	99,111	100,220	−1.11%	1980	
Scranton	PA	75,514	143,333	−47.32%	1930	
Somerville	MA	84,211	103,908	−18.96%	1930	
St. Joseph	MO	71,001	102,979	−31.05%	1900	(Note: Official peak in 1900, but there is evidence the count was padded by about 25,000; −1.90% since 2020.)
Trenton	NJ	91,506	128,009	−28.52%	1950	
Utica	NY	62,978	101,740	−38.10%	1930	
Wilmington	DE	73,512	112,504	−34.66%	1940	
Youngstown	OH	58,832	170,002	−65.39%	1930	

== Locations of 50 most populous cities ==
Location of 50 largest cities by population in the United States

== See also ==
- Demographics of the United States
- Largest cities in the United States by population by decade
- List of largest cities – (world)
- List of largest cities of U.S. states and territories by population
- List of largest cities of U.S. states and territories by historical population
- List of United States cities by area
- List of United States cities by elevation
- List of United States cities by population density
- Lists of populated places in the United States
- United States Census Bureau
  - List of United States urban areas
  - List of U.S. states and territories by population
  - List of United States counties and county equivalents
- Office of Management and Budget
  - Statistical area (United States)
    - Combined statistical area
      - Core-based statistical area
        - List of core-based statistical areas
      - Metropolitan statistical area
        - List of metropolitan statistical areas
      - Micropolitan statistical area
        - List of micropolitan statistical areas
