= Greater Toronto Area =

Metropolitan area in Southern Ontario, Canada

- Metropolitan area
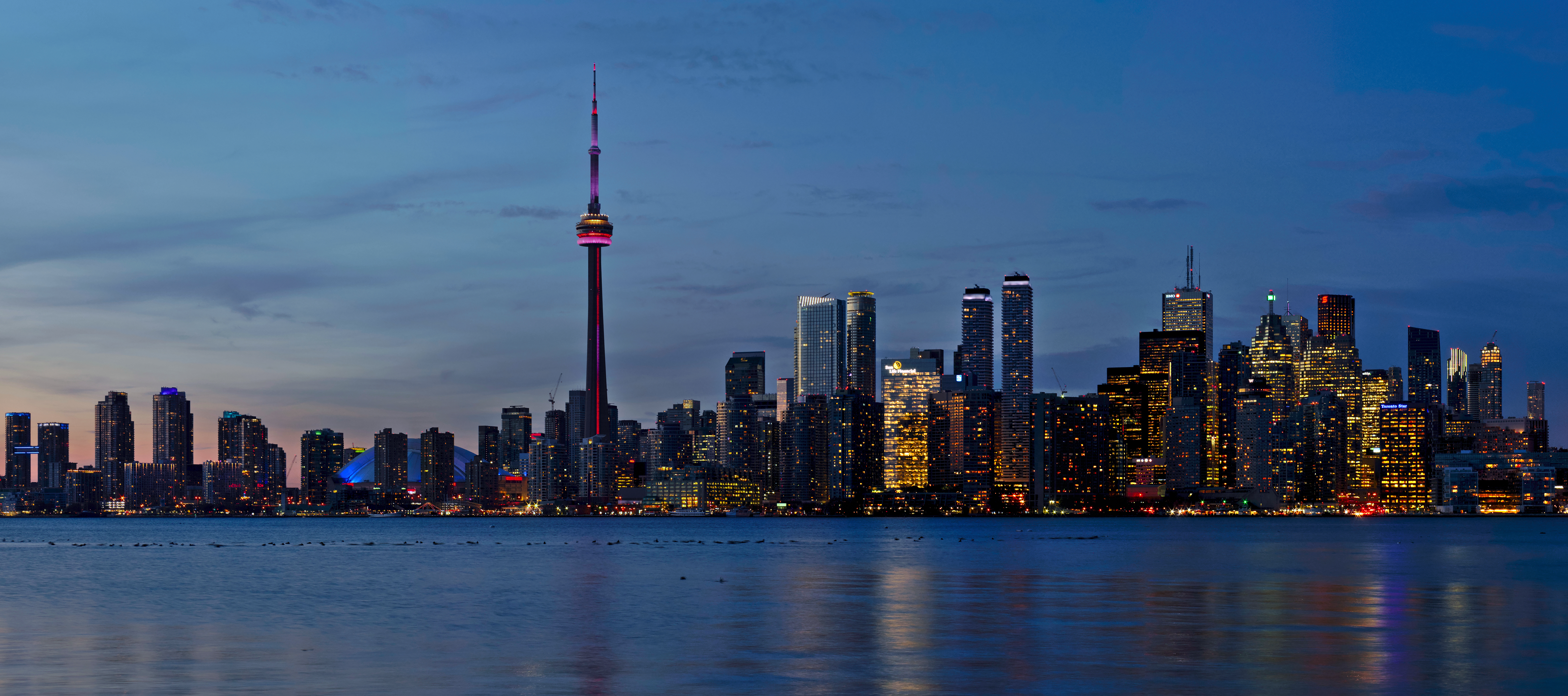
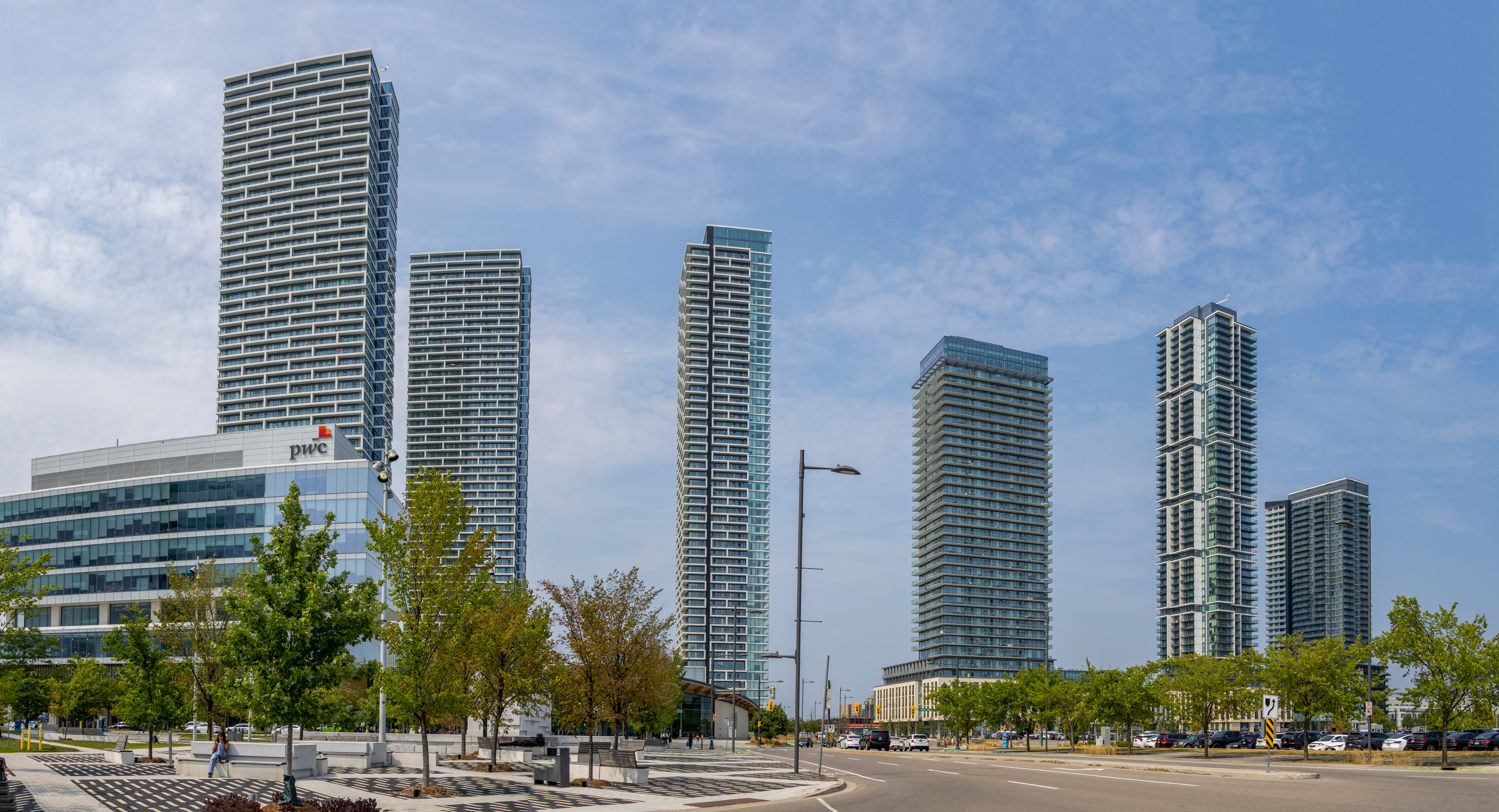
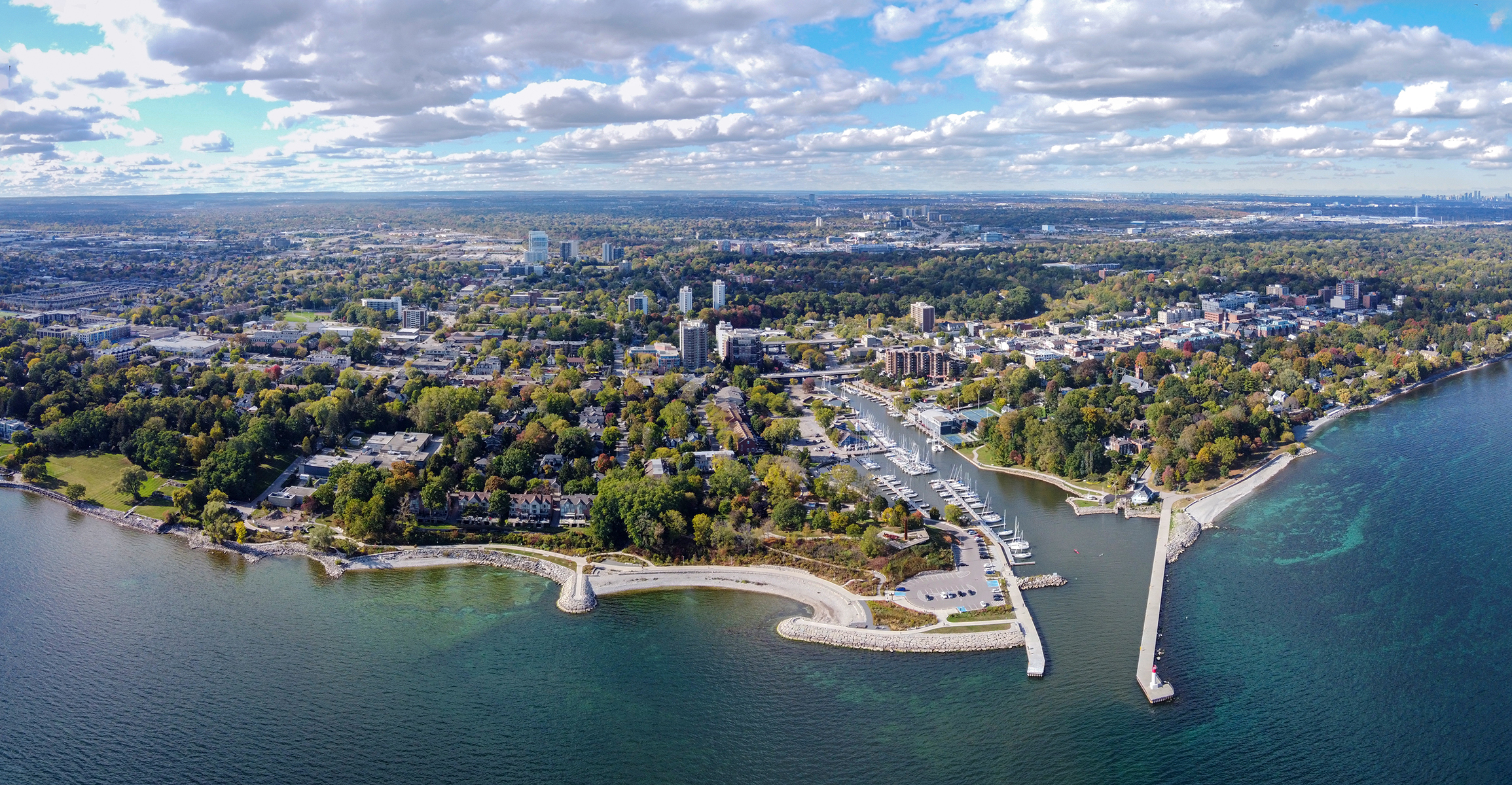
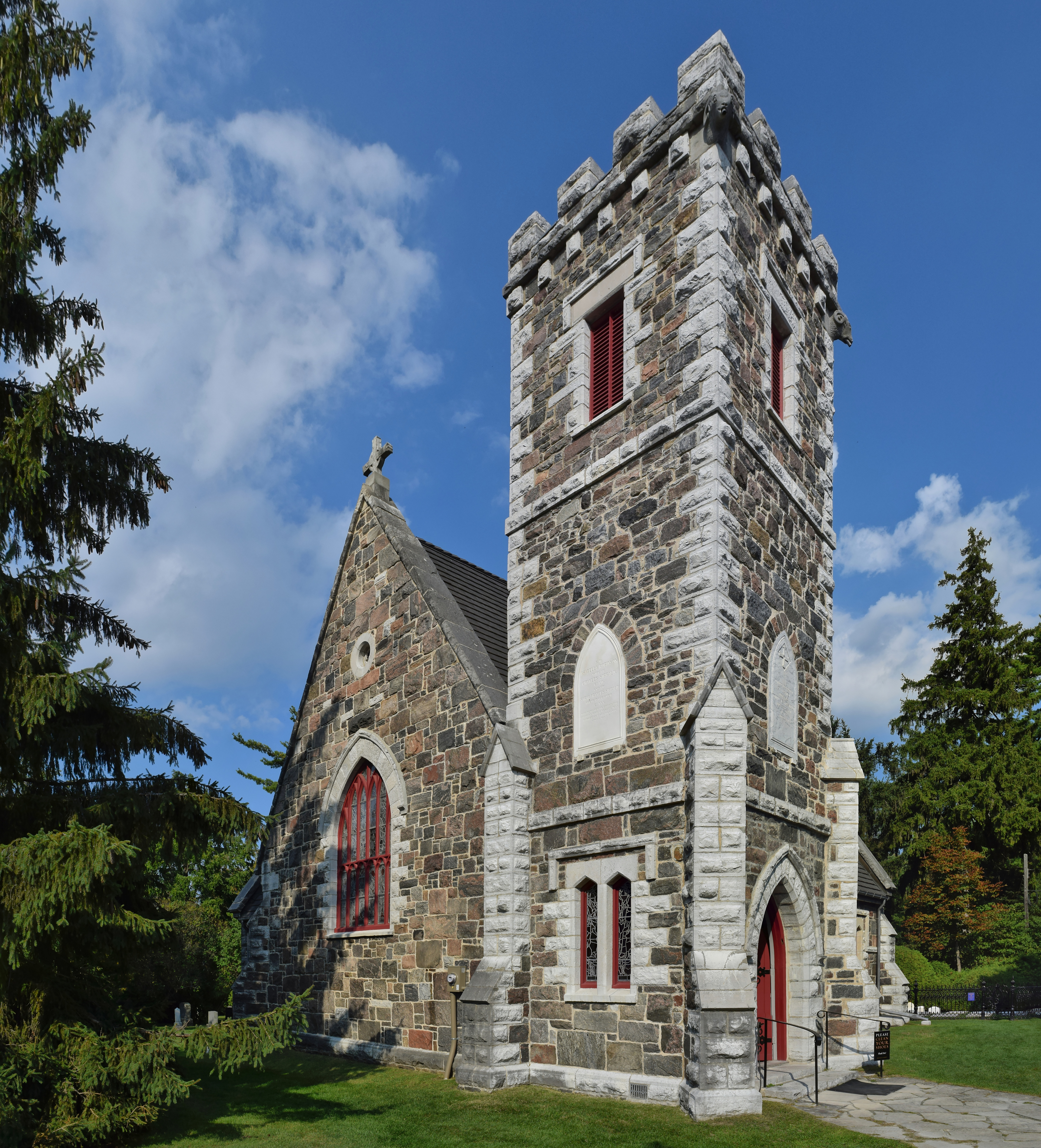
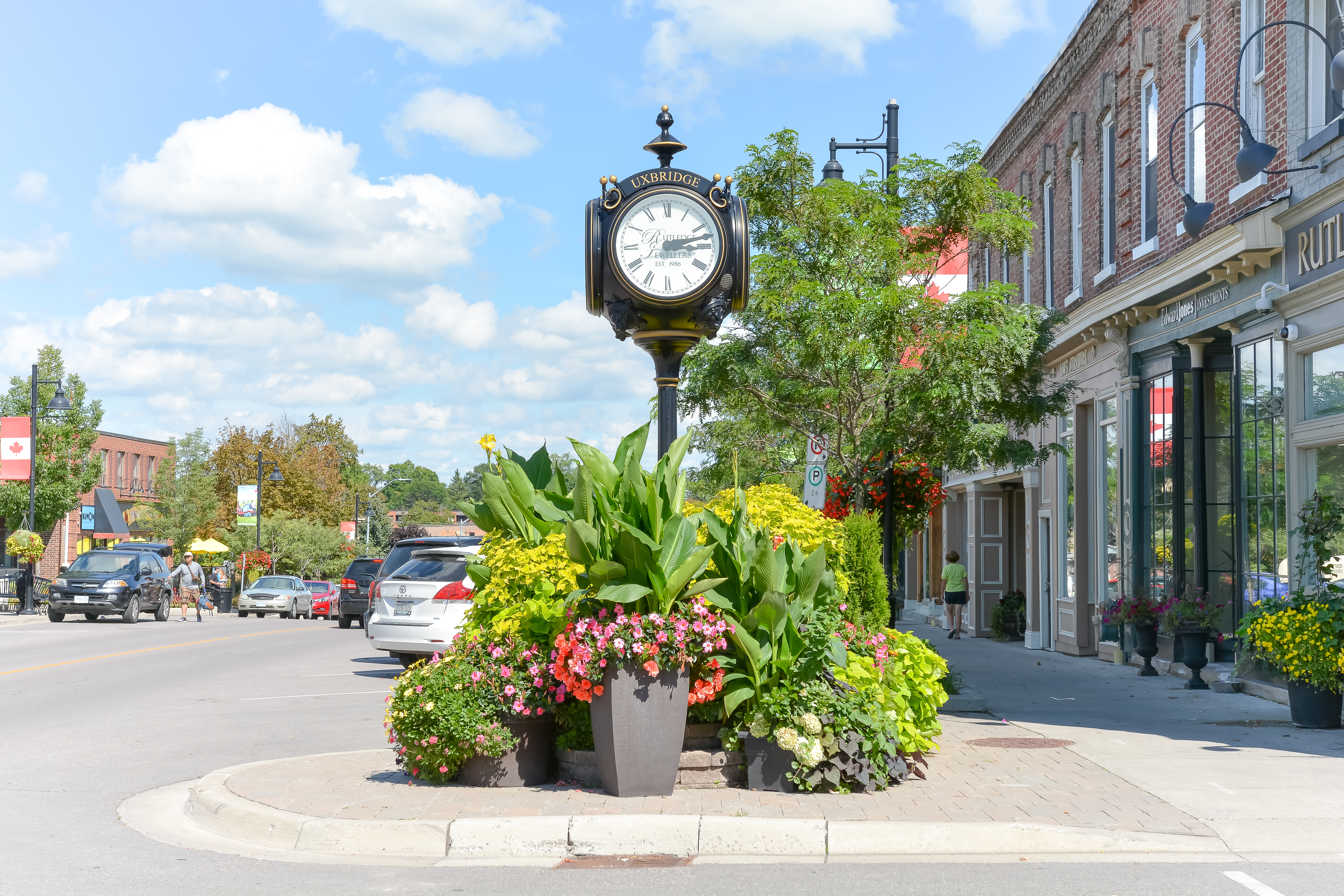
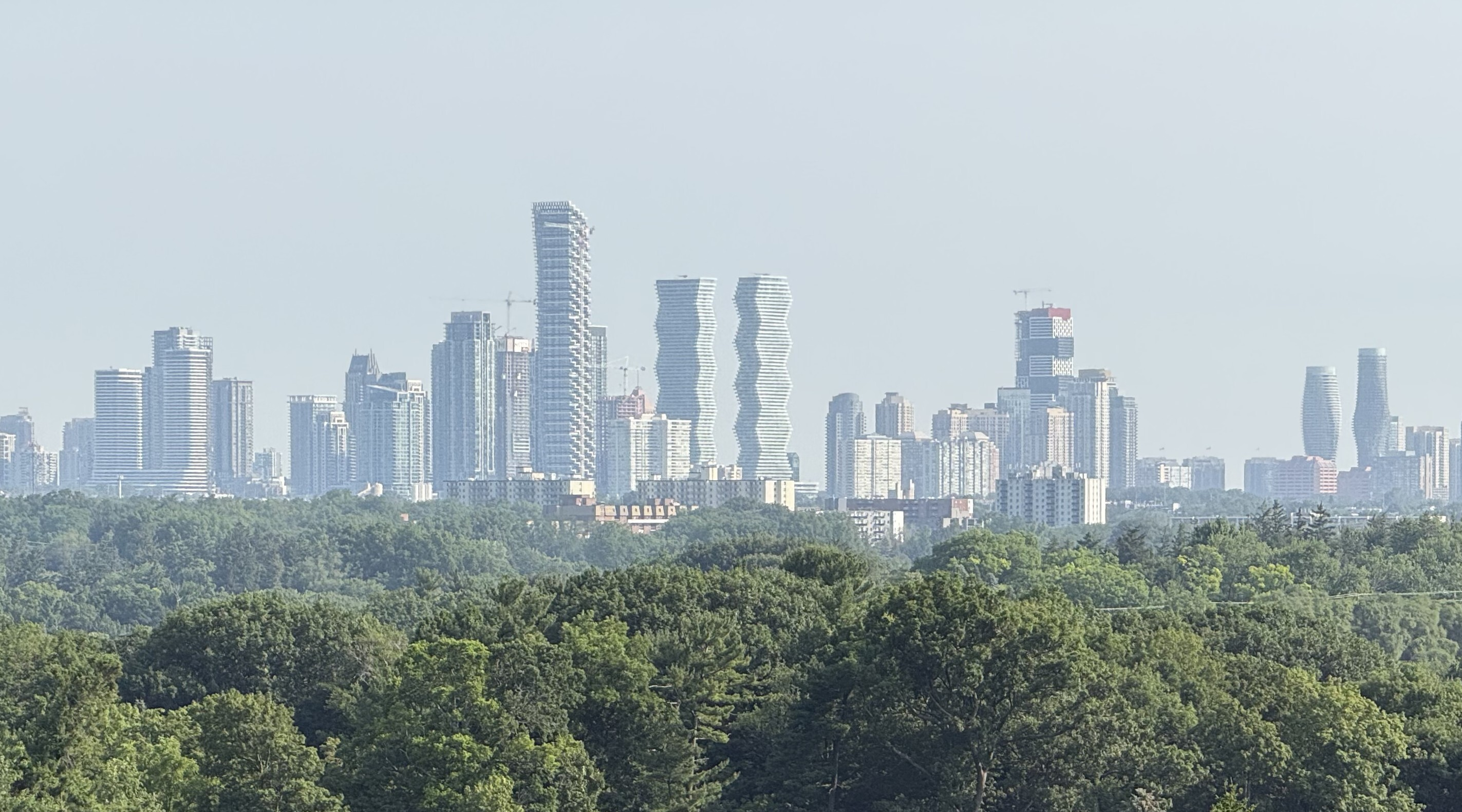
- From top, left to right: the southern portion of downtown Toronto; Vaughan Metropolitan Centre; Oakville; St. George's Anglican Church in Georgina; downtown Uxbridge; Mississauga City Centre
- Nickname: GTA
- Municipalities in the Greater Toronto Area
- Interactive map of Greater Toronto Area
- Location within Ontario Location within Canada
- Coordinates: 43°38′33″N 79°23′14″W
- Country: Canada
- Province: Ontario
- Composition: Durham Region; Halton Region; Peel Region; Toronto; York Region

Area
  - Land: 7,123.64 km^{2} (2,750.45 sq mi)

Population (2021)
  - Total: 6,711,985
  - Estimate (2025): 7,108,874
  - Rank: 1st in Canada
  - Density: 1,076.79/km^{2} (2,788.9/sq mi)

GDP (Nominal, 2022)
  - Total: CA$522.38 billion
- Time zone: UTC−5 (EST)
  - Summer (DST): UTC−4 (EDT)
- Postal code: L, M
- Area codes: 226, 249, 289, 416, 437, 519, 647, 705, 905, 365

The Greater Toronto Area, commonly referred to as the GTA, includes Canada's most populous city, Toronto, and the regional municipalities of Durham, Halton, Peel, and York. In total, the region contains 25 urban, suburban, and rural municipalities. The Greater Toronto Area begins in Burlington in Halton Region to the west, and extends along Lake Ontario past downtown Toronto eastward to Clarington in Durham Region.

According to the 2021 census, the Census Metropolitan Area (CMA) of Toronto has a total population of 6.202 million residents, making it Canada's most populous metropolitan area, and the 7th-largest in North America. However, the Greater Toronto Area, which is an economic area defined by the Government of Ontario, includes communities that are not included in the CMA, as defined by Statistics Canada. Extrapolating the data for all 25 communities in the Greater Toronto Area from the 2021 Census, the total population for the economic region included 6,711,985 people.

The Greater Toronto Area is a part of several larger areas in Southern Ontario. The area is also combined with the city of Hamilton to form a conurbation known as the Greater Toronto and Hamilton Area (GTHA). The GTHA combined with Niagara Region form the core of the Golden Horseshoe.

== Etymology ==
The term "Greater Toronto" was first used in writing as early as the 1900s although at the time, the term referred only to the old city of Toronto and to its immediate townships and villages, which became Metropolitan Toronto in 1954 and became the current city of Toronto in 1998. The use of the term involving the four surrounding regional municipalities came into formal use in the mid-1980s, when it was used in a widely discussed report on municipal governance restructuring in the region and was later made official as a provincial planning area. However, it did not come into everyday usage until the mid-to-late 1990s.

In 2006, the term began to be supplanted in the field of spatial planning as provincial policy increasingly began to refer to either the "Greater Toronto and Hamilton Area" (GTHA) (Note: Adopters include the regional transportation planning body Metrolinx, the Ministry of Energy and Infrastructure and the Regional Municipality of Halton.) or the still-broader "Greater Golden Horseshoe". The latter includes the Greater Toronto Area's satellite municipalities, such as Peterborough, Barrie, Guelph, Kitchener, Waterloo, Cambridge and Niagara Region. The GTA continues, however, to be in official use elsewhere in the Government of Ontario, such as the Ministry of Finance.

== Census metropolitan area ==
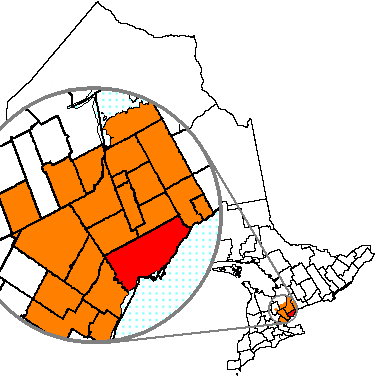
A map of Toronto's Census Metropolitan Area, which contains a large portion of the GTA

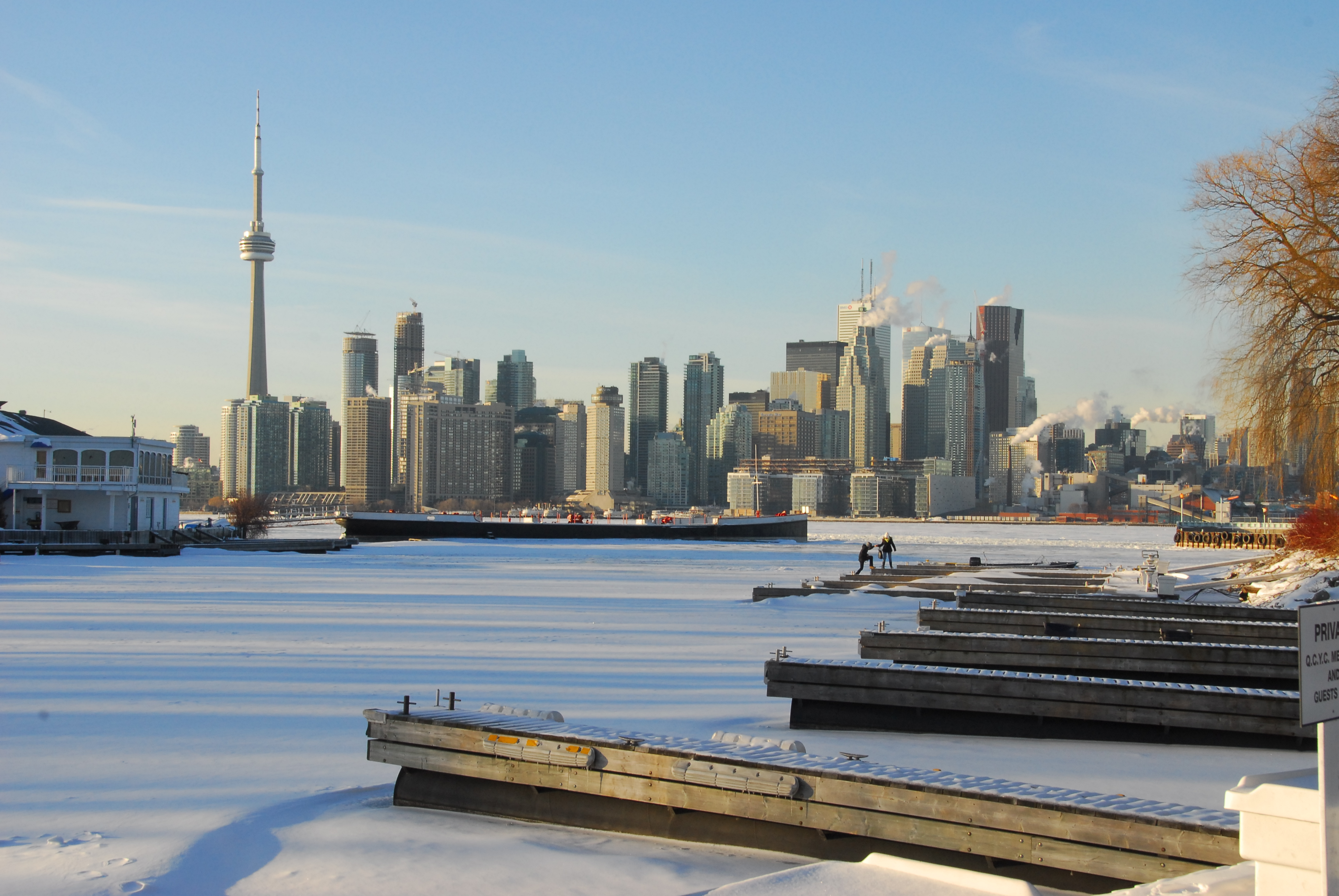
Toronto is the central city of the Greater Toronto Area.

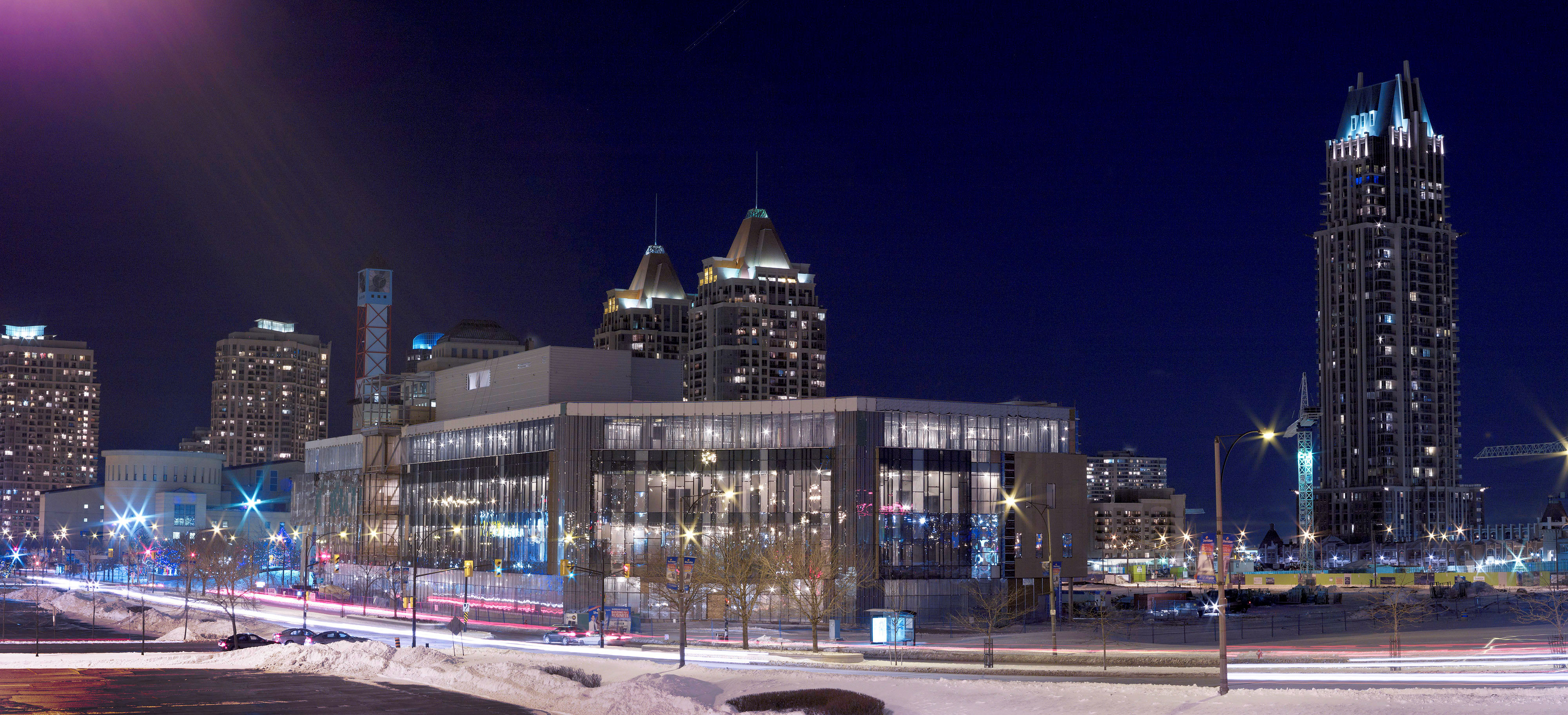
Mississauga is the largest city in Peel Region and the second-largest city in the Greater Toronto Area.

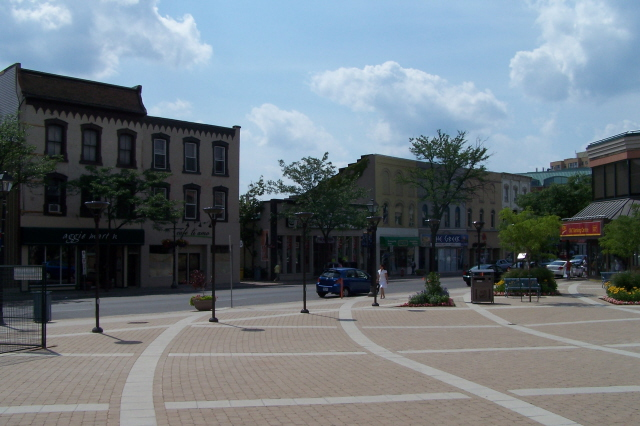
Brampton, also in Peel Region, is the third-largest city in the Greater Toronto Area.

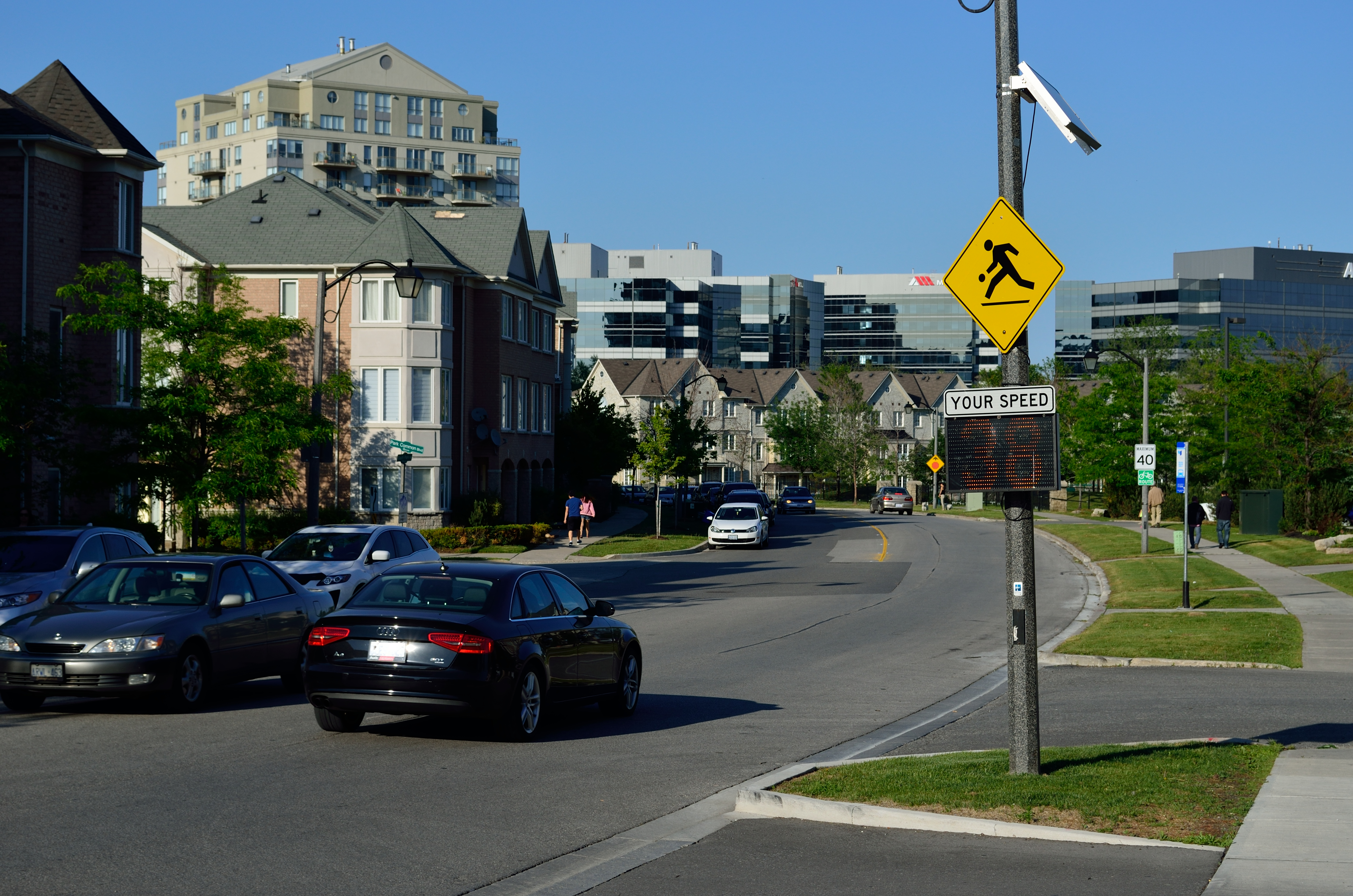
Markham is the largest city in York Region and the fourth-largest city in the Greater Toronto Area.

Some municipalities considered part of the GTA are not within the Toronto Census Metropolitan Area (CMA), which is smaller than the land area and population of the GTA planning area. For example, Oshawa is the centre of its own CMA, yet deemed part of the Greater Toronto Area, while other municipalities, such as New Tecumseth in southern Simcoe County and Mono Township in Dufferin County are included in the Toronto CMA but not in the GTA. These different border configurations result in the GTA's population being higher than the Toronto CMA by nearly one-half million people, often leading to confusion amongst people when trying to sort out Toronto's urban population.

Other nearby urban areas, such as Hamilton, Barrie, St. Catharines-Niagara, or Kitchener-Waterloo, are not part of the GTA or the Toronto CMA, but form their own CMAs near the GTA. Ultimately, all the aforementioned places are part of the Greater Golden Horseshoe metropolitan region, an urban agglomeration, which is the fifth most populous in North America. It is part of the Great Lakes megalopolis, containing an estimated 59.1 million people in 2011.

Municipalities in Greater Toronto Area and related CMAs
Census division	Census subdivision	In GTA	Toronto CMA	Oshawa CMA	Hamilton CMA
Toronto		✓	✓		
Durham Region	Ajax	✓	✓		
Durham Region	Clarington	✓		✓	
Durham Region	Brock	✓			
Durham Region	Oshawa	✓		✓	
Durham Region	Pickering	✓	✓		
Durham Region	Scugog	✓			
Durham Region	Uxbridge	✓	✓		
Durham Region	Whitby	✓		✓	
Halton Region	Burlington	✓			✓
Halton Region	Halton Hills	✓	✓		
Halton Region	Milton	✓	✓		
Halton Region	Oakville	✓	✓		
Peel Region	Brampton	✓	✓		
Peel Region	Caledon	✓	✓		
Peel Region	Mississauga	✓	✓		
York Region	Aurora	✓	✓		
York Region	East Gwillimbury	✓	✓		
York Region	Georgina	✓	✓		
York Region	King	✓	✓		
York Region	Markham	✓	✓		
York Region	Newmarket	✓	✓		
York Region	Richmond Hill	✓	✓		
York Region	Vaughan	✓	✓		
York Region	Whitchurch-Stouffville	✓	✓		
York Region	Chippewas of Georgina Island First Nation	✓	✓		
Dufferin County	Mono		✓		
Dufferin County	Orangeville		✓		
Simcoe County	Bradford West Gwillimbury		✓		
Simcoe County	New Tecumseth		✓		

=== Extended area ===
The term "Greater Toronto and Hamilton Area" (GTHA) refers to the GTA, and the city of Hamilton, located along the western border of the Greater Toronto Area. The term has been adopted by several organizations, including Metrolinx and the Ministry of Energy) because of the growing commuter population in the combined region. The GTHA and the Regional Municipality of Niagara form the inner ring of the larger Greater Golden Horseshoe, an urban agglomeration and secondary region of Ontario.

== History ==
=== Early history ===
Historically, the Greater Toronto Area was home to a number of First Nations who lived on the shore of Lake Ontario long before the first Europeans arrived in the region. At various times, the Neutral, the Seneca, the Mohawk and the Wendat (Huron) nations were living in the vicinity. The Mississaugas arrived in the late 17th or early 18th century, driving out the occupying Haudenosaunee. While it is unclear as to who was the first European to reach the Toronto area, there is no question it occurred in the 17th century.

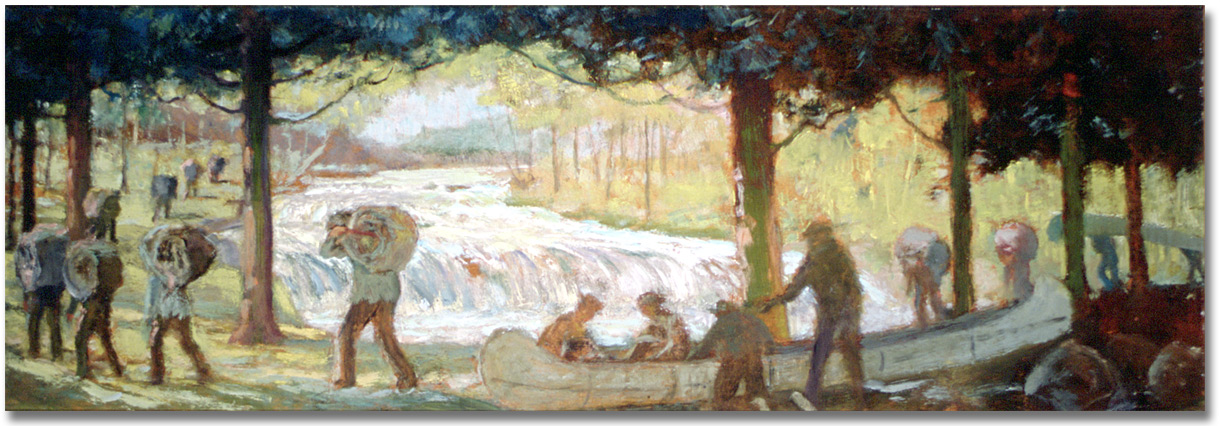
By the 17th century, the area was a crucial point for travel, with the Humber and Rouge River providing a shortcut to Lake Simcoe and the upper Great Lakes. These routes were known as the Toronto Passage.

The area would later become very crucial for its series of trails and water routes that led from northern and western Canada to the Gulf of Mexico. Known as the "Toronto Carrying-Place Trail", it followed the Humber River, as an important overland shortcut between Lake Ontario, Lake Simcoe and the upper Great Lakes. For this reason the area, under French fur traders, became a major part of the North American fur trade. The French would later establish three trading forts, Magasin Royal in the 1720s, although abandoned within the decade, Fort Toronto in 1750 and Fort Rouillé in 1751. During the Seven Years' War both forts were abandoned but Fort Toronto was later renovated. Fort Rouillé was burnt down after the Battle of Fort Niagara in 1759 by the French garrison during the French and Indian War.

The first large influx of European settlers to settle the region were the United Empire Loyalists arriving after the American Revolution, when various individuals petitioned the Crown for land in and around the Toronto area. In 1787, the British negotiated the purchase of more than a quarter million acres (1,000 km^{2} [390 sq mi]) of land in the area of Toronto with the Mississaugas of New Credit. York County, would later be created by Governor John Graves Simcoe in 1792, which would at its largest size, comprise all of what is now Halton Region, Toronto, Peel Region, York Region and parts of Durham Region.

The GTA saw three American incursions during the War of 1812. The Town of York (present-day Toronto) was attacked by American forces at Battle of York, on April 27, 1813; and was subsequently occupied until May 8. The second incursion occurred several months later, in July 1813, with two landings in the GTA. On July 29, American forces landed at Burlington Beach (present-day Burlington) in an attempt to dislodge British forces at the adjacent Burlington Heights. However, finding the British forces too well-entrenched for any assault to be successful, the American naval force withdrew and proceeded east towards York. The American landings at York on July 31 went unopposed, with most of the soldiers garrisoned at York directed to defend Burlington Heights. The third incursion occurred a year later, when an American naval squadron arrived outside of York's harbour on August 6, 1814. The squadron dispatched USS Lady of the Lake to enter the harbour in order to gauge the town's defences, where it briefly exchanged cannon fire with Fort York before withdrawing to rejoin the American squadron outside the harbour. American forces did not attempt a landing during this incursion, although remained outside York's harbour for three days before departing.

In 1816, Wentworth County (which would later become the city of Hamilton) and Halton County were created from York County. York County would later serve as the setting for the beginnings of the Upper Canada Rebellion with William Lyon Mackenzie's armed march from Holland Landing towards York Township on Yonge Street, eventually leading up to the battle at Montgomery's Tavern. In 1851, Ontario County (present-day Durham Region) and Peel County were separated from York.

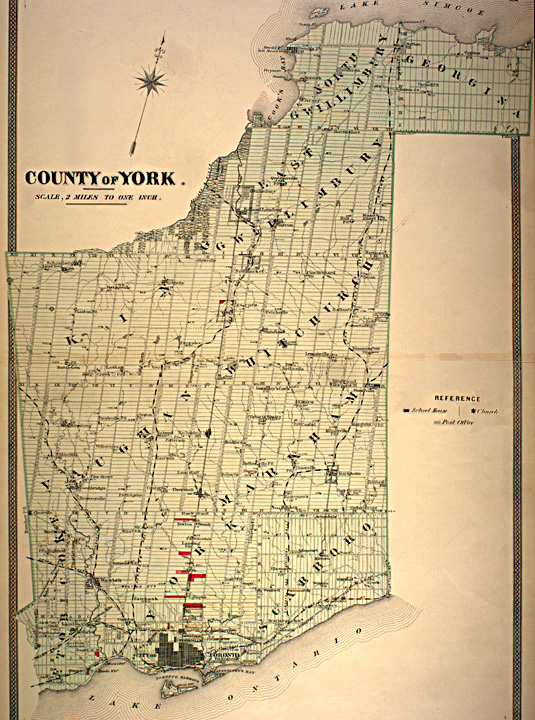
Although the original boundaries of York County encompassed nearly all of the GTA, by 1851, its boundaries had been reduced to the present-day City of Toronto and York Region as depicted on the 1871 map.

=== Since 1901 ===
The idea towards a streamlined local government to control local infrastructure was made as early as 1907 by, William Findlay Maclean, a member of parliament and founder of The Toronto World, who called for the expansion of the government of the former City of Toronto in order to create a Greater Toronto. The idea for a single government municipality would not be seriously explored until the late 1940s when planners decided the city needed to incorporate its immediate suburbs. However, due to strong opposition from suburban politicians, a compromise was struck, which resulted in the creation of Metropolitan Toronto. In 1953, the portion of York County south of Steeles Avenue, a concession road which formed a common boundary between several townships across the width of the county, was severed from it and incorporated as the Municipality of Metropolitan Toronto. With the concession of Metro Toronto, the offices of York County were moved from Toronto to Newmarket.

Originally, the membership in Metropolitan Toronto included the City of Toronto and five townships: East York, Etobicoke, North York, Scarborough and York; as well as seven villages and towns, which became amalgamated into their surrounding townships in 1967. The early Metro Toronto government debated over the annexation of surrounding townships of Markham, Pickering and Vaughan. Frederick Goldwin Gardiner, the first Metro Toronto Chairman, planned on the conversion of these townships into boroughs of the Metro Toronto government. In 1971, the remaining areas of York County was replaced by the Ontario government with the Regional Municipality of York. In 1974, Ontario and Durham Counties were reorganized to become the Regional Municipality of Durham; Pickering west of Rouge River was transferred to Scarborough at that time. Peel County became Peel Region in 1974 as well. In 1980, North York would be incorporated into a city, with York following suit in 1983 and Etobicoke and Scarborough in 1984, although still part of the Metropolitan Toronto municipal government.

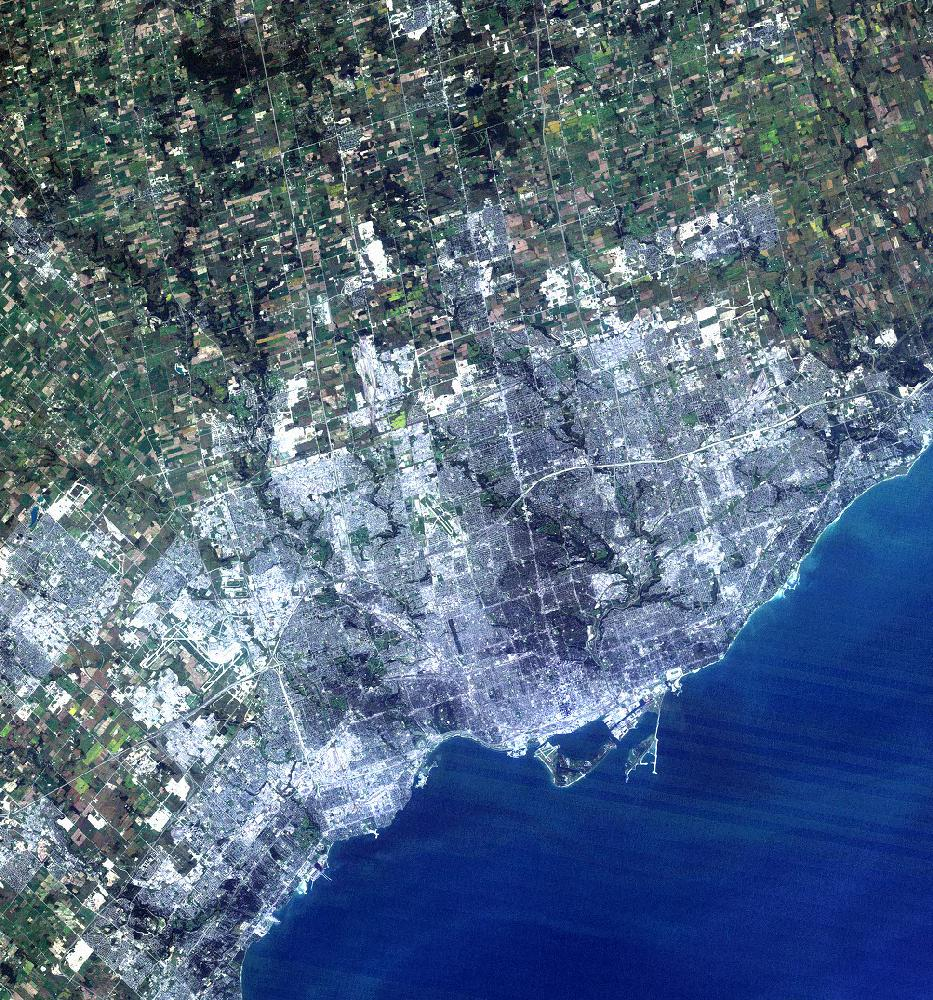
Satellite image of Toronto and Mississauga during the mid-1980s

In 1992, the Ontario government passed legislation requiring Metropolitan Toronto to include the rest of the Greater Toronto Area into its planning. However, there was fear different parts of the municipal system were working against one another. Therefore, Bob Rae, the Premier of Ontario, appointed Anne Golden to head a GTA task force to govern the region's quality of life, competitiveness and governance. During this time, the Metro Toronto government advocated to the task force the creation of a new GTA authority, which would be made up of 21 of the 30 existing municipalities in the GTA at the time. The proposal from Metro Toronto would have resulted in 15 new municipalities. The City of Mississauga argued consolidation should take place only in such a way the new municipalities would have a population between 400,000 and 800,000. The Town of Markham had similarly advocated municipal consolidation in York Region but opposed to complete consolidation into a single municipality. Municipal consolidation faced stiff opposition, however, from smaller communities such as Ajax, Milton, and the borough of East York.

The task force's recommendation to eliminate the Metro Toronto government, and consolidate its remaining municipalities into an enlarged City of Toronto was completed in 1997 and became official in 1998, under the Common Sense Revolution of the then premier, Mike Harris. However, the task force's recommendation to create a GTA-wide upper-tier municipality was not taken up by the Harris government for fear that a GTA-wide municipality would recreate the intermunicipal competitiveness that was believed to have impaired the former Metro Toronto government.

Metrolinx, an agency of the Government of Ontario, was established to oversee public transit development across the Greater Toronto Area.

The Greater Toronto Area hosted the 2015 Pan American Games.

As of the 2016 census, the GTA was the only region in Ontario to have a greater share of their population under the age of 14 than over the age of 65.

== Geography ==
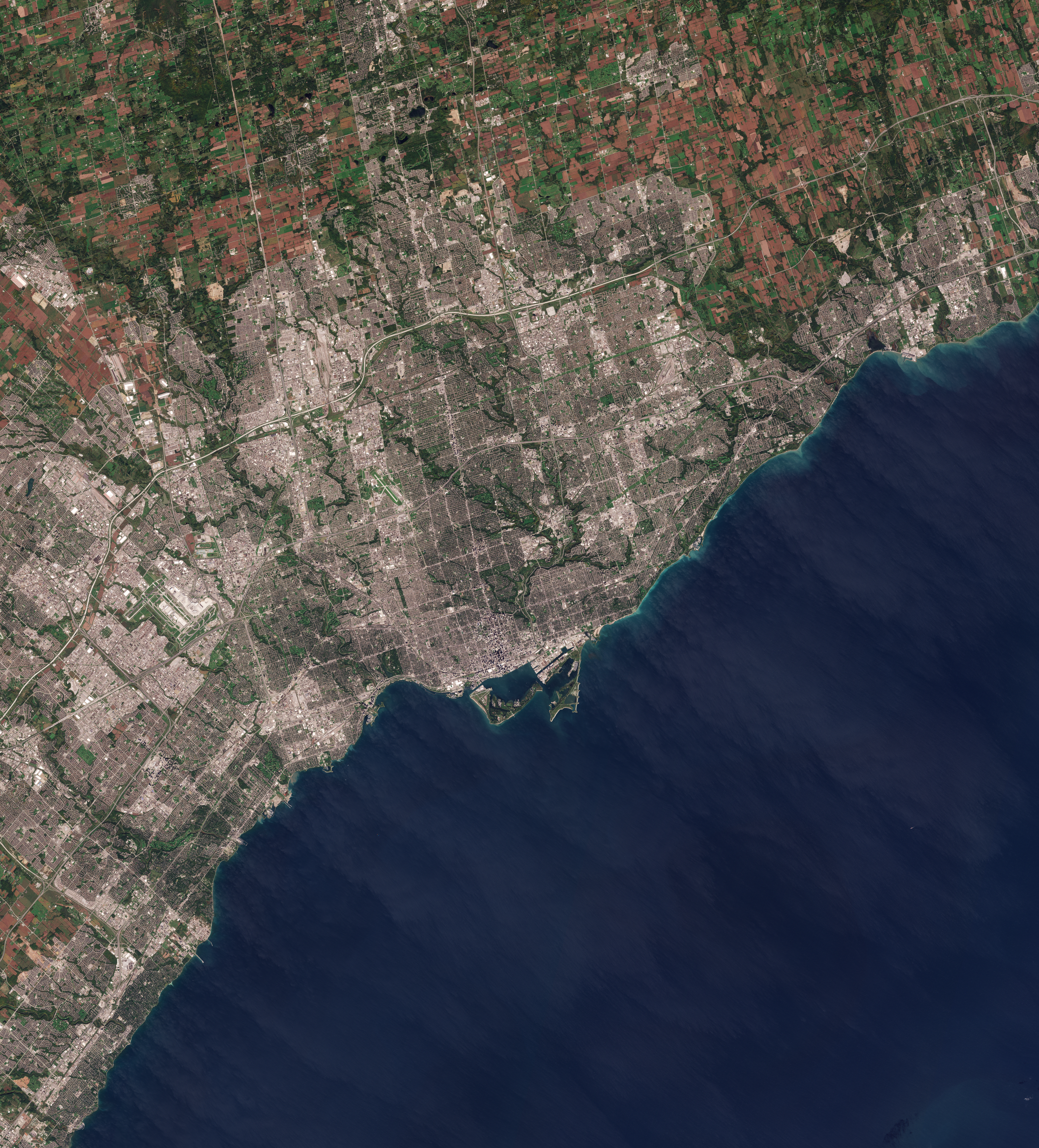
Satellite image of the Greater Toronto Area in 2018

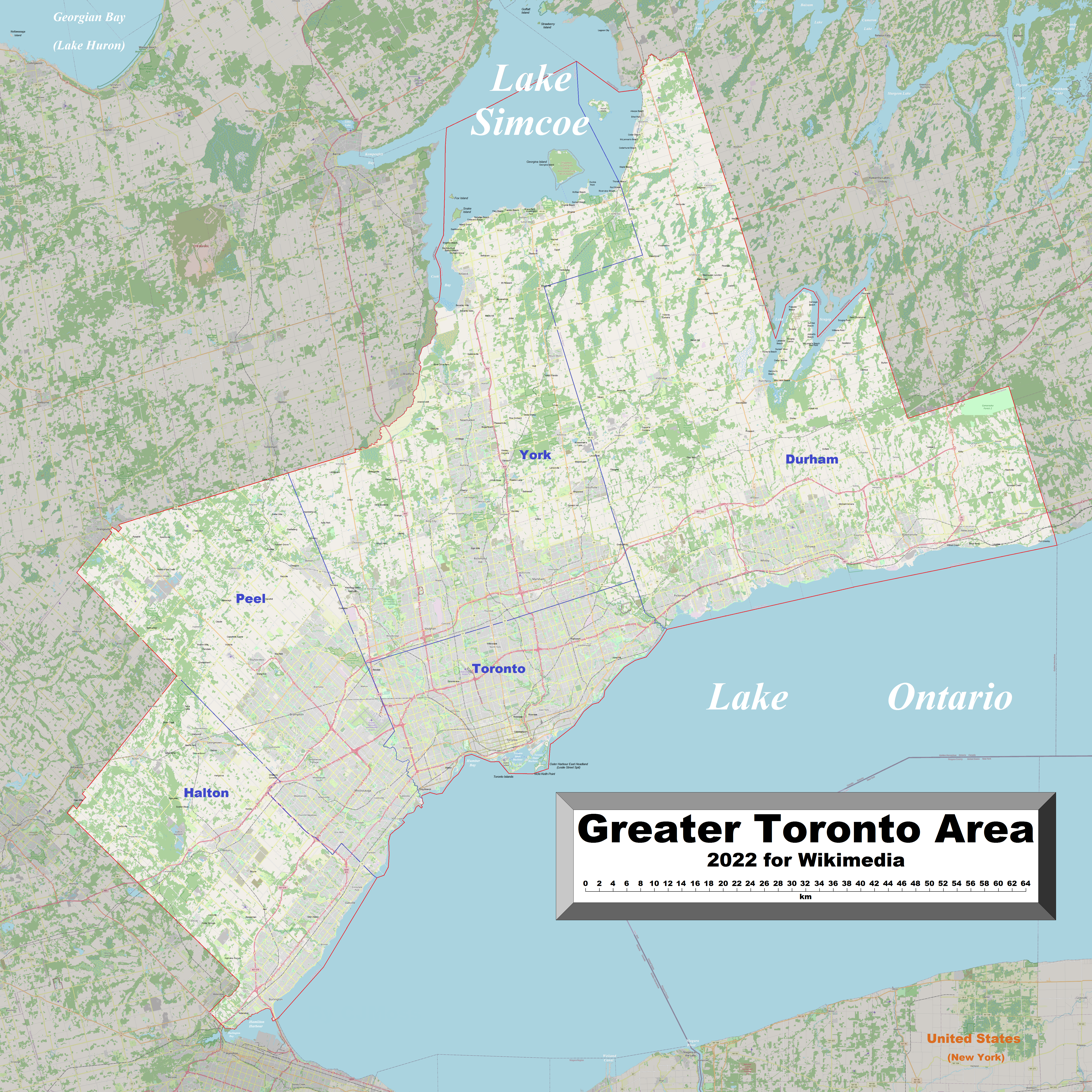
Detailed map of the Greater Toronto Area in 2022

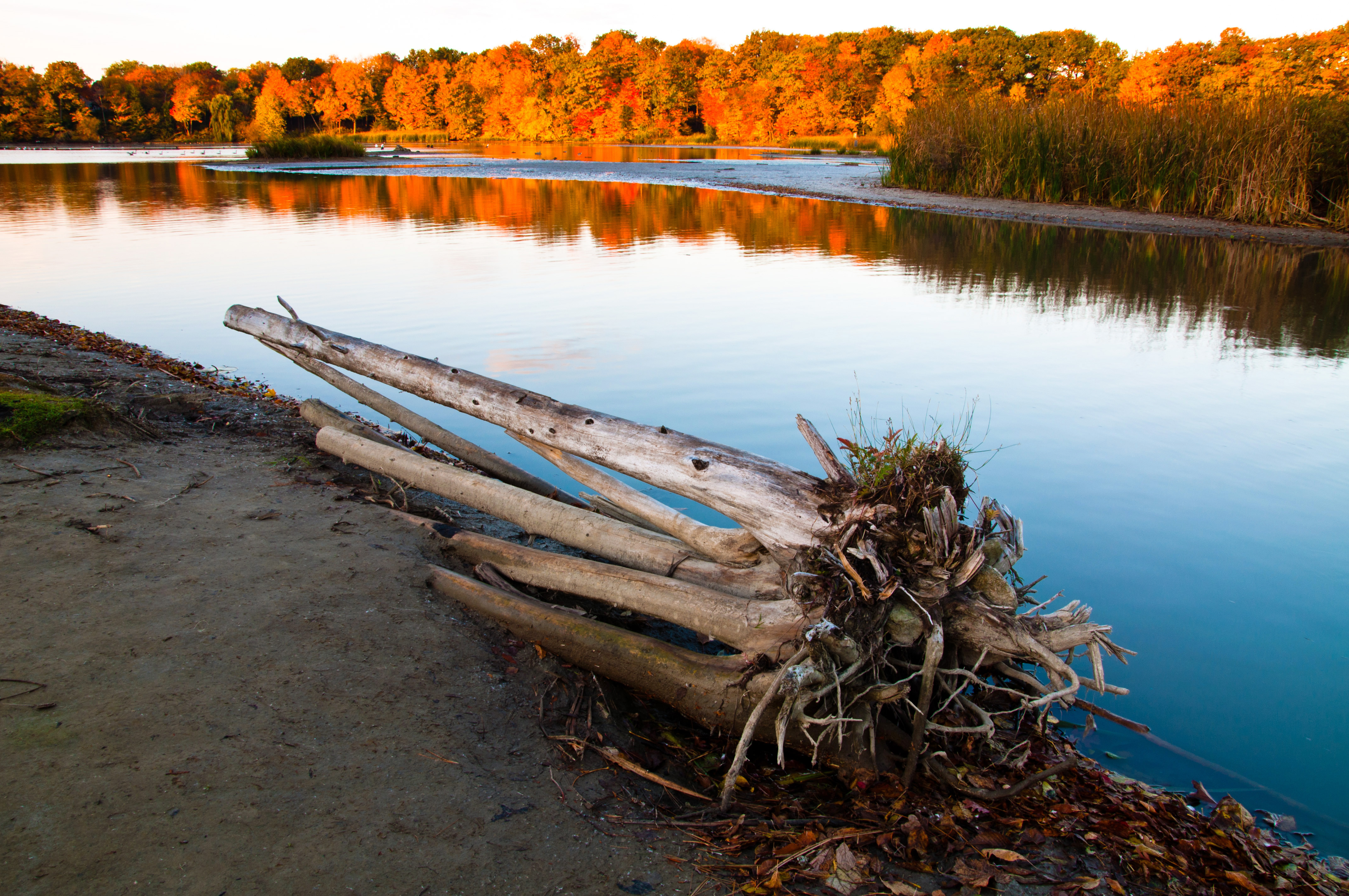
Rouge National Urban Park is an urban national park in the GTA. It includes parts of the municipalities of Markham, Pickering, Toronto, and Uxbridge.

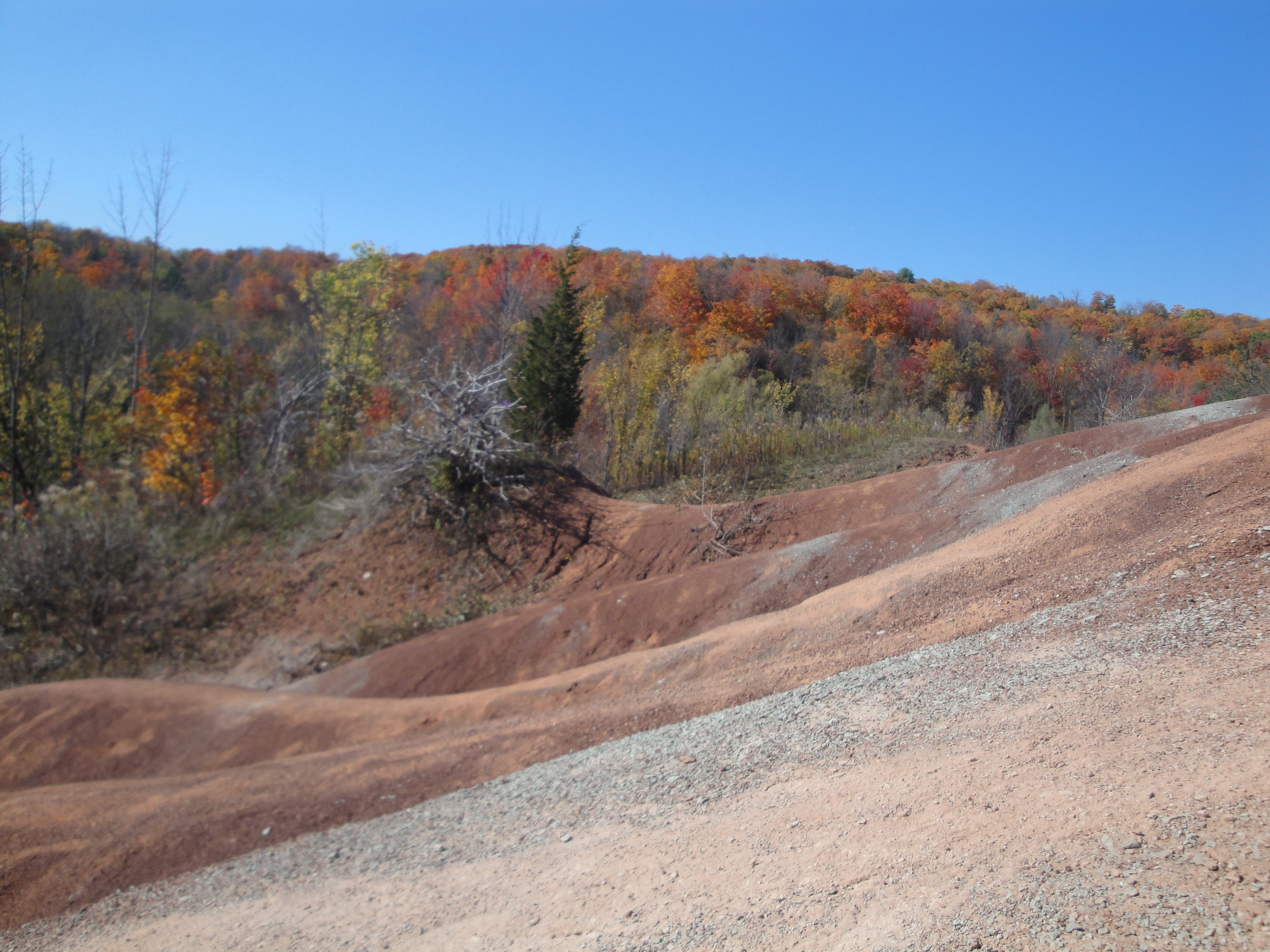
Cheltenham Badlands in Caledon

The Greater Toronto Area covers an area of 7,125 square kilometres (2,751 square miles). The region itself is bordered by Lake Ontario to the south, Kawartha Lakes to the east, the Niagara Escarpment to the west, and Lake Simcoe to the north. The region creates a natural ecosystem known as the Greater Toronto Bioregion. The Greater Toronto Area forms part of the neck of the Ontario Peninsula.

Vast parts of the region remain farmland and forests, making it one of the distinctive features of the geography of the GTA. Most of the urban areas in the GTA hold large urban forest. For the most part designated as parkland, the ravines are largely undeveloped. Rouge Park is also one of the largest nature parks within the core of a metropolitan area. Much of these areas also constitute the Toronto ravine system, which consists of deep and steep valleys, and a number of conservation areas in the region which are managed by Toronto and Region Conservation Authority. The Cheltenham Badlands, in Caledon, is an example of environmental degradation from poor agricultural practice. The Scarborough Bluffs are part of the Glacial Lake Iroquois shoreline.

In 2005, the Government of Ontario also passed legislation to prevent urban development and sprawl on environmentally sensitiveland in the Greater Toronto Area, known as the Greenbelt; many of the areas include protected sections of the Oak Ridges Moraine, Rouge Park, and the Niagara Escarpment. Nevertheless, low-density suburban developments continue to be built, some of which is on or near ecologically sensitive and protected areas. The provincial government attempted to address the issue through the "Places to Grow" legislation passed in 2005, which emphasizes higher-density growth in existing urban centres over the next 25 years (i.e., until 2030).

=== Climate ===
The climate of the Greater Toronto Area is classified as humid continental, according to the Köppen climate classification. Much of the Greater Toronto Area is under Köppen Dfb (warm summer subtype) zone. Old Toronto (excluding the Toronto Islands) and some areas between there and Burlington to the southwest are under the Köppen Dfa climate zone, the hot summer subtype; this is the result of the urban heat island effect, especially in Old Toronto. Precipitation averages 832 millimetres (32.8 inches) annually, which is fairly distributed through the year but is driest in later winter with higher average totals in the later summer.

In winter, typical high temperatures will range from −5 to 3 °C (23 to 37 °F) and low temperatures from −12 to −5 °C (10 to 23 °F). Cold arctic outbreaks keep daytime highs below −10 °C (14 °F) for several days but that does not occur in every winter, and low temperatures sometimes drop below −18 °C (0 °F), with the accompanying wind chill making that feel much colder. Annual snowfall averages between 80 and 150 centimetres (31 and 59 inches) across the area. Mild and snow-free spells are also a feature of Toronto's winter, with temperatures surpassing 5 °C (41 °F) for several days to occasionally above 15 °C (59 °F). Spring is short and often cool to mild, and snow can sometimes fall well into April but rarely accumulates. The transition from spring into summer can be rapid. Summer is warm on average to hot and moderately humid with high temperatures typically between 24 and 31 °C (75 and 88 °F), while low temperatures average between 15 °C (59 °F) in the suburbs and 18 to 20 °C (64 to 68 °F) downtown and near the lake. Although fairly sunny, summers have long stretches of humid conditions that give rise to frequent thunderstorm activity, and very heavy rainfall sometimes results in flash flooding. Heat wave conditions with temperatures between 32 and 35 °C (90 and 95 °F) are common but typically do not last long, and rarely temperatures rarely reach 38 °C (100 °F). Humidex values can be high during heat episodes; at their highest, they have exceeded 50 °C (122 °F). Immediate lakeshore locations have generally lower average maximum temperatures but they can also experience hot conditions when offshore winds prevail. Normally, autumns alternate between wet and dry with lengthy periods of mild and calm weather. Temperatures fall and windspeeds increase sharply in November. By December, cold and snowy weather is more common, and the average temperature falls close to or just below 0 °C (32 °F).

==== Climate data ====
Climate data for Toronto (The Annex) WMO ID: 71266; coordinates 43°40′N 79°24′W; elevation: 112.5 m (369 ft); 1991–2020 (Note: Humidex, wind chill, average rain, average snow, rain days, snow days, and sunshine are from 1981 to 2010) normals, extremes 1840–present (Note: Maximum and minimum temperature data at The Annex was recorded by human observers from March 1840 to June 2003 under the station name "TORONTO". From July 2003 to present, climate data has been recorded by an automatic weather station under the name "TORONTO CITY".)
Month	Jan	Feb	Mar	Apr	May	Jun	Jul	Aug	Sep	Oct	Nov	Dec	Year
Record high humidex	15.7	12.2	21.7	31.6	39.8	44.5	43.0	42.6	43.8	31.2	26.1	17.7	44.5
Record high °C (°F)	16.1 (61.0)	19.1 (66.4)	26.7 (80.1)	32.2 (90.0)	34.4 (93.9)	36.7 (98.1)	40.6 (105.1)	38.9 (102.0)	37.8 (100.0)	30.8 (87.4)	23.9 (75.0)	19.9 (67.8)	40.6 (105.1)
Mean daily maximum °C (°F)	−0.3 (31.5)	0.6 (33.1)	5.1 (41.2)	11.7 (53.1)	18.8 (65.8)	24.2 (75.6)	27.0 (80.6)	26.1 (79.0)	22.0 (71.6)	14.6 (58.3)	8.1 (46.6)	2.6 (36.7)	13.4 (56.1)
Daily mean °C (°F)	−3.5 (25.7)	−2.7 (27.1)	1.7 (35.1)	7.8 (46.0)	14.5 (58.1)	19.8 (67.6)	22.5 (72.5)	21.9 (71.4)	17.9 (64.2)	11.2 (52.2)	5.2 (41.4)	−0.1 (31.8)	9.7 (49.5)
Mean daily minimum °C (°F)	−6.7 (19.9)	−6.0 (21.2)	−1.8 (28.8)	3.9 (39.0)	10.0 (50.0)	15.3 (59.5)	18.1 (64.6)	17.7 (63.9)	13.8 (56.8)	7.7 (45.9)	2.3 (36.1)	−2.7 (27.1)	6.0 (42.8)
Record low °C (°F)	−32.8 (−27.0)	−31.7 (−25.1)	−26.7 (−16.1)	−15.0 (5.0)	−3.9 (25.0)	−2.2 (28.0)	3.9 (39.0)	4.4 (39.9)	−2.2 (28.0)	−8.9 (16.0)	−20.6 (−5.1)	−30.0 (−22.0)	−32.8 (−27.0)
Record low wind chill	−37	−34	−26	−17	−8	0	0	0	0	−8	−17	−34	−37
Average precipitation mm (inches)	64.6 (2.54)	53.9 (2.12)	52.8 (2.08)	78.0 (3.07)	76.4 (3.01)	81.6 (3.21)	76.5 (3.01)	71.9 (2.83)	69.4 (2.73)	69.1 (2.72)	70.8 (2.79)	57.8 (2.28)	822.7 (32.39)
Average rainfall mm (inches)	29.1 (1.15)	29.7 (1.17)	33.6 (1.32)	61.1 (2.41)	82.0 (3.23)	70.9 (2.79)	63.9 (2.52)	81.1 (3.19)	84.7 (3.33)	64.3 (2.53)	75.4 (2.97)	38.2 (1.50)	714.0 (28.11)
Average snowfall cm (inches)	37.2 (14.6)	27.0 (10.6)	19.8 (7.8)	5.0 (2.0)	0.0 (0.0)	0.0 (0.0)	0.0 (0.0)	0.0 (0.0)	0.0 (0.0)	0.1 (0.0)	8.3 (3.3)	24.1 (9.5)	121.5 (47.8)
Average precipitation days (≥ 0.2 mm)	16.3	12.8	13.0	13.1	13.4	12.1	11.7	9.5	10.2	11.4	13.0	13.7	150.2
Average rainy days (≥ 0.2 mm)	5.4	4.8	7.9	11.2	12.7	11.0	10.4	10.2	11.1	11.7	10.9	7.0	114.1
Average snowy days (≥ 0.2 cm)	12.0	8.7	6.5	2.2	0.0	0.0	0.0	0.0	0.0	0.08	3.1	8.4	40.9
Average relative humidity (%) (at 15:00 LST)	68.0	65.4	58.5	53.4	53.1	55.2	54.3	56.7	59.6	65.0	67.1	70.9	60.6
Mean monthly sunshine hours	85.9	111.3	161.0	180.0	227.7	259.6	279.6	245.6	194.4	154.3	88.9	78.1	2,066.3
Percentage possible sunshine	29.7	37.7	43.6	44.8	50.0	56.3	59.8	56.7	51.7	45.1	30.5	28.0	44.5
Source: Environment and Climate Change Canada

Climate data for Bowmanville Mostert (Clarington) Climate ID: 6150830; coordinates 43°55′N 78°40′W; elevation 99.1 m (325 ft), 1981–2010 normals, extremes 1966–2002
Month	Jan	Feb	Mar	Apr	May	Jun	Jul	Aug	Sep	Oct	Nov	Dec	Year
Record high °C (°F)	13.0 (55.4)	12.5 (54.5)	21.5 (70.7)	29.0 (84.2)	33.0 (91.4)	33.5 (92.3)	36.0 (96.8)	35.0 (95.0)	32.2 (90.0)	26.0 (78.8)	21.1 (70.0)	17.5 (63.5)	36.0 (96.8)
Mean daily maximum °C (°F)	−1.4 (29.5)	0.0 (32.0)	4.3 (39.7)	11.3 (52.3)	18.0 (64.4)	23.1 (73.6)	25.8 (78.4)	24.8 (76.6)	20.4 (68.7)	13.7 (56.7)	7.2 (45.0)	1.6 (34.9)	12.4 (54.3)
Daily mean °C (°F)	−5.6 (21.9)	−4.4 (24.1)	−0.2 (31.6)	6.4 (43.5)	12.4 (54.3)	17.5 (63.5)	20.0 (68.0)	19.2 (66.6)	15.0 (59.0)	8.7 (47.7)	3.4 (38.1)	−2.2 (28.0)	7.5 (45.5)
Mean daily minimum °C (°F)	−9.9 (14.2)	−8.8 (16.2)	−4.6 (23.7)	1.5 (34.7)	6.8 (44.2)	11.8 (53.2)	14.3 (57.7)	13.5 (56.3)	9.5 (49.1)	3.6 (38.5)	−0.4 (31.3)	−6.0 (21.2)	2.6 (36.7)
Record low °C (°F)	−34.0 (−29.2)	−30.0 (−22.0)	−26.0 (−14.8)	−14.4 (6.1)	−5.0 (23.0)	−1.0 (30.2)	2.8 (37.0)	−0.5 (31.1)	−3.3 (26.1)	−8.3 (17.1)	−17.8 (0.0)	−34.5 (−30.1)	−34.5 (−30.1)
Average precipitation mm (inches)	63.1 (2.48)	50.5 (1.99)	55.0 (2.17)	70.6 (2.78)	75.9 (2.99)	83.8 (3.30)	63.2 (2.49)	78.1 (3.07)	98.7 (3.89)	70.8 (2.79)	88.6 (3.49)	68.1 (2.68)	866.5 (34.11)
Average rainfall mm (inches)	32.2 (1.27)	32.8 (1.29)	41.0 (1.61)	68.0 (2.68)	75.9 (2.99)	83.8 (3.30)	63.2 (2.49)	78.1 (3.07)	98.7 (3.89)	70.6 (2.78)	83.1 (3.27)	46.1 (1.81)	773.3 (30.44)
Average snowfall cm (inches)	31.0 (12.2)	17.7 (7.0)	14.1 (5.6)	2.6 (1.0)	0.0 (0.0)	0.0 (0.0)	0.0 (0.0)	0.0 (0.0)	0.0 (0.0)	0.1 (0.0)	5.6 (2.2)	22.0 (8.7)	93.1 (36.7)
Average precipitation days (≥ 0.2 mm)	12.5	10.8	11.2	12.5	12.2	12.0	10.4	11.5	13.0	13.0	14.3	13.0	146.4
Average rainy days (≥ 0.2 mm)	5.5	5.3	8.0	11.8	12.2	12.0	10.4	11.5	13.0	13.0	12.7	7.4	122.7
Average snowy days (≥ 0.2 cm)	7.8	6.3	4.0	1.1	0.0	0.0	0.0	0.0	0.0	0.1	2.1	6.5	27.9
Source: Environment Canada

Climate data for Oshawa WCPC Climate ID: 6155878; coordinates 43°52′N 78°50′W, elevation: 83.8 m (275 ft); 1991−2020 normals, extremes 1882–present
Month	Jan	Feb	Mar	Apr	May	Jun	Jul	Aug	Sep	Oct	Nov	Dec	Year
Record high °C (°F)	14.0 (57.2)	18.3 (64.9)	23.5 (74.3)	29.5 (85.1)	32.0 (89.6)	34.5 (94.1)	39.4 (102.9)	36.0 (96.8)	34.4 (93.9)	28.2 (82.8)	23.0 (73.4)	16.5 (61.7)	39.4 (102.9)
Mean daily maximum °C (°F)	−1.1 (30.0)	−0.2 (31.6)	4.5 (40.1)	10.6 (51.1)	17.5 (63.5)	22.7 (72.9)	25.7 (78.3)	24.8 (76.6)	20.9 (69.6)	13.6 (56.5)	7.5 (45.5)	2.2 (36.0)	12.4 (54.3)
Daily mean °C (°F)	−5 (23)	−4.2 (24.4)	0.3 (32.5)	6.2 (43.2)	12.6 (54.7)	17.8 (64.0)	20.9 (69.6)	20.1 (68.2)	16.2 (61.2)	9.5 (49.1)	3.9 (39.0)	−1.2 (29.8)	8.1 (46.6)
Mean daily minimum °C (°F)	−8.9 (16.0)	−8.3 (17.1)	−3.9 (25.0)	1.7 (35.1)	7.6 (45.7)	12.9 (55.2)	15.8 (60.4)	15.4 (59.7)	11.4 (52.5)	5.3 (41.5)	0.3 (32.5)	−4.6 (23.7)	3.7 (38.7)
Record low °C (°F)	−32.8 (−27.0)	−34.4 (−29.9)	−28.3 (−18.9)	−17.2 (1.0)	−6.1 (21.0)	0.0 (32.0)	2.8 (37.0)	0.0 (32.0)	−5 (23)	−12.8 (9.0)	−19.4 (−2.9)	−32.2 (−26.0)	−34.4 (−29.9)
Average precipitation mm (inches)	74.7 (2.94)	53.5 (2.11)	53.9 (2.12)	86.9 (3.42)	85.1 (3.35)	94.0 (3.70)	85.8 (3.38)	74.2 (2.92)	86.2 (3.39)	71.8 (2.83)	72.5 (2.85)	67.8 (2.67)	906.3 (35.68)
Average rainfall mm (inches)	41.2 (1.62)	27.7 (1.09)	42.9 (1.69)	85.3 (3.36)	85.1 (3.35)	94.0 (3.70)	85.8 (3.38)	74.2 (2.92)	86.2 (3.39)	71.7 (2.82)	67.4 (2.65)	43.1 (1.70)	804.6 (31.68)
Average snowfall cm (inches)	33.5 (13.2)	25.8 (10.2)	10.9 (4.3)	1.6 (0.6)	0.0 (0.0)	0.0 (0.0)	0.0 (0.0)	0.0 (0.0)	0.0 (0.0)	0.1 (0.0)	5.1 (2.0)	24.7 (9.7)	101.7 (40.0)
Average precipitation days (≥ 0.2 mm)	13.8	10.2	10.6	12.4	12.2	11.8	10.8	10.3	11.0	13.5	13.6	12.9	143.1
Average rainy days (≥ 0.2 mm)	6.0	4.3	7.9	12.1	12.2	11.8	10.8	10.3	11.0	13.5	12.4	7.8	120.1
Average snowy days (≥ 0.2 cm)	8.5	6.8	3.3	0.74	0.0	0.0	0.0	0.0	0.0	0.09	1.6	5.8	26.8
Source: Environment and Climate Change Canada

Climate data for Burlington TS Climate ID: 6151064; coordinates 43°20′N 79°50′W, elevation: 99.1 m (325 ft); 1981–2010 normals, extremes 1866–present (Note: Long term records have been recorded at various climate stations in or nearby Burlington since 1866)
Month	Jan	Feb	Mar	Apr	May	Jun	Jul	Aug	Sep	Oct	Nov	Dec	Year
Record high °C (°F)	18.4 (65.1)	17.9 (64.2)	27.2 (81.0)	32.0 (89.6)	36.1 (97.0)	38.9 (102.0)	41.1 (106.0)	38.3 (100.9)	37.8 (100.0)	31.1 (88.0)	26.7 (80.1)	22.0 (71.6)	41.1 (106.0)
Mean daily maximum °C (°F)	−0.6 (30.9)	0.8 (33.4)	5.2 (41.4)	12.4 (54.3)	19.4 (66.9)	25.0 (77.0)	28.0 (82.4)	26.7 (80.1)	21.8 (71.2)	15.1 (59.2)	8.0 (46.4)	2.4 (36.3)	13.7 (56.7)
Daily mean °C (°F)	−4.4 (24.1)	−3.2 (26.2)	1.0 (33.8)	7.5 (45.5)	13.9 (57.0)	19.4 (66.9)	22.5 (72.5)	21.4 (70.5)	16.9 (62.4)	10.4 (50.7)	4.4 (39.9)	−1 (30)	9.1 (48.4)
Mean daily minimum °C (°F)	−8.1 (17.4)	−7.1 (19.2)	−3.3 (26.1)	2.6 (36.7)	8.3 (46.9)	13.8 (56.8)	16.9 (62.4)	16.1 (61.0)	11.9 (53.4)	5.7 (42.3)	0.7 (33.3)	−4.3 (24.3)	4.4 (39.9)
Record low °C (°F)	−30.6 (−23.1)	−29.4 (−20.9)	−27.2 (−17.0)	−14.4 (6.1)	−7.2 (19.0)	0.0 (32.0)	1.1 (34.0)	1.7 (35.1)	−3.9 (25.0)	−11.1 (12.0)	−22.8 (−9.0)	−27.8 (−18.0)	−30.6 (−23.1)
Average precipitation mm (inches)	66.0 (2.60)	54.5 (2.15)	61.6 (2.43)	70.6 (2.78)	81.0 (3.19)	69.1 (2.72)	75.3 (2.96)	82.0 (3.23)	83.1 (3.27)	71.9 (2.83)	84.9 (3.34)	63.0 (2.48)	863.1 (33.98)
Average rainfall mm (inches)	31.8 (1.25)	33.0 (1.30)	44.7 (1.76)	68.2 (2.69)	81.0 (3.19)	69.1 (2.72)	75.3 (2.96)	82.0 (3.23)	83.1 (3.27)	71.9 (2.83)	79.7 (3.14)	43.5 (1.71)	763.3 (30.05)
Average snowfall cm (inches)	34.2 (13.5)	21.5 (8.5)	16.9 (6.7)	2.4 (0.9)	0.0 (0.0)	0.0 (0.0)	0.0 (0.0)	0.0 (0.0)	0.0 (0.0)	0.0 (0.0)	5.3 (2.1)	19.5 (7.7)	99.9 (39.3)
Average precipitation days (≥ 0.2 mm)	12.4	9.6	11.0	12.5	11.8	10.9	10.1	10.2	10.9	10.7	13.9	11.9	135.8
Average rainy days (≥ 0.2 mm)	4.9	4.5	8.0	11.7	11.8	10.9	10.1	10.2	10.9	10.7	12.7	7.7	113.9
Average snowy days (≥ 0.2 cm)	8.1	6.0	3.6	0.84	0.0	0.0	0.0	0.0	0.0	0.0	1.6	5.4	25.5
Source: Environment and Climate Change Canada

Climate data for Georgetown WWTP (Halton Hills) Climate ID: 6152695; coordinates 43°28′34″N 79°52′45″W; elevation: 221 m (725 ft); 1981–2010 normals
Month	Jan	Feb	Mar	Apr	May	Jun	Jul	Aug	Sep	Oct	Nov	Dec	Year
Record high °C (°F)	17.0 (62.6)	15.5 (59.9)	25.0 (77.0)	31.5 (88.7)	34.5 (94.1)	36.0 (96.8)	37.0 (98.6)	36.5 (97.7)	35.5 (95.9)	29.5 (85.1)	22.0 (71.6)	20.5 (68.9)	37.0 (98.6)
Mean daily maximum °C (°F)	−1.7 (28.9)	−0.2 (31.6)	4.6 (40.3)	12.1 (53.8)	19.1 (66.4)	24.4 (75.9)	26.9 (80.4)	25.8 (78.4)	21.4 (70.5)	14.3 (57.7)	7.3 (45.1)	1.1 (34.0)	12.9 (55.2)
Daily mean °C (°F)	−6.3 (20.7)	−5.2 (22.6)	−0.9 (30.4)	6.0 (42.8)	12.3 (54.1)	17.4 (63.3)	20.0 (68.0)	19.0 (66.2)	14.8 (58.6)	8.4 (47.1)	2.8 (37.0)	−2.9 (26.8)	7.1 (44.8)
Mean daily minimum °C (°F)	−10.9 (12.4)	−10.2 (13.6)	−6.4 (20.5)	−0.2 (31.6)	5.3 (41.5)	10.4 (50.7)	13.0 (55.4)	12.1 (53.8)	8.1 (46.6)	2.4 (36.3)	−1.7 (28.9)	−6.9 (19.6)	1.3 (34.3)
Record low °C (°F)	−33.0 (−27.4)	−31.5 (−24.7)	−28.0 (−18.4)	−13.0 (8.6)	−5.0 (23.0)	−0.5 (31.1)	3.0 (37.4)	0.0 (32.0)	−4.0 (24.8)	−8.5 (16.7)	−15.5 (4.1)	−29.5 (−21.1)	−33.0 (−27.4)
Average precipitation mm (inches)	67.8 (2.67)	60.0 (2.36)	57.2 (2.25)	76.5 (3.01)	79.3 (3.12)	74.8 (2.94)	73.5 (2.89)	79.3 (3.12)	86.2 (3.39)	68.3 (2.69)	88.5 (3.48)	65.9 (2.59)	877.4 (34.54)
Average rainfall mm (inches)	29.7 (1.17)	28.4 (1.12)	35.2 (1.39)	71.3 (2.81)	79.0 (3.11)	74.8 (2.94)	73.5 (2.89)	79.3 (3.12)	86.2 (3.39)	67.8 (2.67)	79.9 (3.15)	36.4 (1.43)	741.5 (29.19)
Average snowfall cm (inches)	38.1 (15.0)	31.7 (12.5)	22.1 (8.7)	5.2 (2.0)	0.3 (0.1)	0.0 (0.0)	0.0 (0.0)	0.0 (0.0)	0.0 (0.0)	0.5 (0.2)	8.6 (3.4)	29.5 (11.6)	135.9 (53.5)
Average precipitation days (≥ 0.2 mm)	12.6	9.4	10.6	12.4	11.9	11.2	10.6	10.6	11.7	12.3	13.3	12.3	138.9
Average rainy days (≥ 0.2 mm)	4.1	4.1	6.4	11.6	11.8	11.2	10.6	10.6	11.7	12.2	11.4	6.5	112.1
Average snowy days (≥ 0.2 cm)	9.4	6.2	4.8	1.4	0.04	0.0	0.0	0.0	0.0	0.27	2.5	6.9	31.5
Source: Environment and Climate Change Canada

Climate data for Oakville Southeast WPCP Climate ID: 615N745; coordinates 43°29′N 79°38′W; elevation: 86.9 m (285 ft); 1981–2010 normals, extremes 1971–2001
Month	Jan	Feb	Mar	Apr	May	Jun	Jul	Aug	Sep	Oct	Nov	Dec	Year
Record high °C (°F)	13.9 (57.0)	15.6 (60.1)	27.5 (81.5)	32.0 (89.6)	33.0 (91.4)	38.0 (100.4)	37.0 (98.6)	37.5 (99.5)	35.0 (95.0)	28.9 (84.0)	23.3 (73.9)	22.0 (71.6)	38.0 (100.4)
Mean daily maximum °C (°F)	−0.4 (31.3)	0.6 (33.1)	4.7 (40.5)	11.3 (52.3)	17.9 (64.2)	23.2 (73.8)	26.3 (79.3)	25.2 (77.4)	20.9 (69.6)	14.3 (57.7)	8.3 (46.9)	2.8 (37.0)	12.9 (55.2)
Daily mean °C (°F)	−4.7 (23.5)	−3.9 (25.0)	0.1 (32.2)	6.4 (43.5)	12.3 (54.1)	17.7 (63.9)	20.9 (69.6)	20.1 (68.2)	15.6 (60.1)	9.3 (48.7)	4.0 (39.2)	−1.3 (29.7)	8.1 (46.6)
Mean daily minimum °C (°F)	−8.9 (16.0)	−8.3 (17.1)	−4.5 (23.9)	1.5 (34.7)	6.8 (44.2)	12.1 (53.8)	15.4 (59.7)	15.0 (59.0)	10.2 (50.4)	4.3 (39.7)	−0.2 (31.6)	−5.5 (22.1)	3.2 (37.8)
Record low °C (°F)	−30.0 (−22.0)	−25.0 (−13.0)	−22.0 (−7.6)	−14.4 (6.1)	−3.3 (26.1)	1.1 (34.0)	7.0 (44.6)	3.0 (37.4)	−1.7 (28.9)	−7.0 (19.4)	−14.0 (6.8)	−27.0 (−16.6)	−30.0 (−22.0)
Average precipitation mm (inches)	59.8 (2.35)	46.7 (1.84)	54.4 (2.14)	65.2 (2.57)	73.9 (2.91)	71.0 (2.80)	75.8 (2.98)	78.3 (3.08)	73.5 (2.89)	70.0 (2.76)	79.3 (3.12)	58.8 (2.31)	806.7 (31.76)
Average rainfall mm (inches)	31.5 (1.24)	30.7 (1.21)	37.2 (1.46)	63.1 (2.48)	73.9 (2.91)	71.0 (2.80)	75.8 (2.98)	78.3 (3.08)	73.5 (2.89)	70.0 (2.76)	76.8 (3.02)	43.9 (1.73)	725.6 (28.57)
Average snowfall cm (inches)	28.3 (11.1)	16.1 (6.3)	17.2 (6.8)	2.1 (0.8)	0.0 (0.0)	0.0 (0.0)	0.0 (0.0)	0.0 (0.0)	0.0 (0.0)	0.0 (0.0)	2.5 (1.0)	14.9 (5.9)	81.0 (31.9)
Average precipitation days (≥ 0.2 mm)	9.6	7.2	9.0	11.1	10.4	10.3	8.8	9.8	10.2	10.4	11.1	9.7	117.6
Average rainy days (≥ 0.2 mm)	4.4	3.8	6.4	10.6	10.4	10.3	8.8	9.8	10.2	10.4	10.6	6.8	102.4
Average snowy days (≥ 0.2 cm)	5.6	3.7	3.2	0.7	0.0	0.0	0.0	0.0	0.0	0.0	1.0	3.4	17.6
Source: Environment and Climate Change Canada

Climate data for Lester B. Pearson International Airport (Brampton and North Mississauga) WMO ID: 71624; coordinates 43°40′38″N 79°37′50″W, elevation: 173.4 m (569 ft), 1991–2020 normals, extremes 1937–present
Month	Jan	Feb	Mar	Apr	May	Jun	Jul	Aug	Sep	Oct	Nov	Dec	Year
Record high humidex	19.0	18.3	29.6	37.9	42.6	45.6	50.3	46.6	48.0	39.1	28.6	23.9	50.3
Record high °C (°F)	17.6 (63.7)	17.7 (63.9)	26.0 (78.8)	31.1 (88.0)	34.4 (93.9)	36.7 (98.1)	37.9 (100.2)	38.3 (100.9)	36.7 (98.1)	31.8 (89.2)	25.1 (77.2)	20.0 (68.0)	38.3 (100.9)
Mean maximum °C (°F)	10.0 (50.0)	9.6 (49.3)	16.9 (62.4)	23.6 (74.5)	29.3 (84.7)	32.6 (90.7)	33.1 (91.6)	32.7 (90.9)	31.1 (88.0)	25.6 (78.1)	17.8 (64.0)	11.3 (52.3)	34.5 (94.1)
Mean daily maximum °C (°F)	−1.2 (29.8)	−0.3 (31.5)	5.0 (41.0)	12.0 (53.6)	19.2 (66.6)	24.5 (76.1)	27.4 (81.3)	26.3 (79.3)	22.3 (72.1)	14.6 (58.3)	7.9 (46.2)	1.9 (35.4)	13.3 (55.9)
Daily mean °C (°F)	−5 (23)	−4.4 (24.1)	0.6 (33.1)	7.0 (44.6)	13.7 (56.7)	19.2 (66.6)	22.1 (71.8)	21.1 (70.0)	16.9 (62.4)	10.0 (50.0)	4.1 (39.4)	−1.6 (29.1)	8.6 (47.5)
Mean daily minimum °C (°F)	−8.9 (16.0)	−8.5 (16.7)	−3.8 (25.2)	1.9 (35.4)	8.2 (46.8)	13.9 (57.0)	16.6 (61.9)	15.8 (60.4)	11.6 (52.9)	5.3 (41.5)	0.2 (32.4)	−5 (23)	3.9 (39.0)
Mean minimum °C (°F)	−19.9 (−3.8)	−18.7 (−1.7)	−13.8 (7.2)	−4.8 (23.4)	1.2 (34.2)	7.3 (45.1)	11.4 (52.5)	10.6 (51.1)	4.5 (40.1)	−1.5 (29.3)	−7.9 (17.8)	−14.9 (5.2)	−22.0 (−7.6)
Record low °C (°F)	−31.3 (−24.3)	−31.1 (−24.0)	−28.9 (−20.0)	−17.2 (1.0)	−5.6 (21.9)	0.6 (33.1)	3.9 (39.0)	1.1 (34.0)	−3.9 (25.0)	−8.3 (17.1)	−18.3 (−0.9)	−31.1 (−24.0)	−31.3 (−24.3)
Record low wind chill	−44.7	−38.9	−36.2	−25.4	−9.5	0.0	0.0	0.0	−8.0	−13.5	−25.4	−38.5	−44.7
Average precipitation mm (inches)	61.6 (2.43)	50.2 (1.98)	50.5 (1.99)	76.7 (3.02)	77.6 (3.06)	80.7 (3.18)	74.0 (2.91)	68.5 (2.70)	69.4 (2.73)	67.2 (2.65)	71.8 (2.83)	58.6 (2.31)	806.8 (31.76)
Average rainfall mm (inches)	33.8 (1.33)	23.9 (0.94)	34.0 (1.34)	70.7 (2.78)	77.5 (3.05)	80.7 (3.18)	74.0 (2.91)	68.5 (2.70)	69.4 (2.73)	67.0 (2.64)	62.7 (2.47)	35.3 (1.39)	697.4 (27.46)
Average snowfall cm (inches)	31.5 (12.4)	27.7 (10.9)	17.2 (6.8)	4.5 (1.8)	0.1 (0.0)	0.0 (0.0)	0.0 (0.0)	0.0 (0.0)	0.0 (0.0)	0.2 (0.1)	9.3 (3.7)	24.1 (9.5)	114.5 (45.1)
Average precipitation days (≥ 0.2 mm)	16.2	12.0	12.3	12.5	12.7	10.8	10.3	9.8	10.2	12.8	12.6	14.9	147.3
Average rainy days (≥ 0.2 mm)	6.2	4.6	7.2	11.7	12.7	10.8	10.3	9.8	10.2	12.8	10.4	7.5	114.1
Average snowy days (≥ 0.2 cm)	12.7	9.7	6.8	2.2	0.12	0.0	0.0	0.0	0.0	0.24	3.6	9.2	44.7
Average relative humidity (%) (at 15:00)	69.7	65.7	58.5	53.4	53.6	54.4	52.9	55.2	57.3	61.6	66.7	70.5	60.0
Average dew point °C (°F)	−8.6 (16.5)	−8.4 (16.9)	−5.2 (22.6)	−0.4 (31.3)	6.4 (43.5)	12.3 (54.1)	14.9 (58.8)	14.9 (58.8)	11.6 (52.9)	5.5 (41.9)	−0.1 (31.8)	−4.9 (23.2)	3.2 (37.8)
Mean monthly sunshine hours	79.7	112.2	159.4	204.4	228.2	249.7	294.4	274.5	215.7	163.7	94.2	86.2	2,161.4
Percentage possible sunshine	27.6	38.0	43.2	50.8	50.1	54.1	63.0	63.4	57.4	47.8	32.0	30.9	46.5
Source 1: Environment and Climate Change Canada
Source 2: weatherstats.ca (for dewpoint and monthly/yearly average absolute maximum/minimum temperature)

Climate data for Albion Field Centre (Albion Township and Caledon) Climate ID: 6150103; coordinates 43°55′N 79°50′W; elevation: 281.9 m (925 ft); 1981–2010 normals, extremes 1969–2001
Month	Jan	Feb	Mar	Apr	May	Jun	Jul	Aug	Sep	Oct	Nov	Dec	Year
Record high °C (°F)	12.0 (53.6)	14.5 (58.1)	24.5 (76.1)	30.0 (86.0)	33.0 (91.4)	34.5 (94.1)	36.1 (97.0)	35.0 (95.0)	34.4 (93.9)	30.6 (87.1)	22.2 (72.0)	19.5 (67.1)	36.1 (97.0)
Mean daily maximum °C (°F)	−2.8 (27.0)	−1.4 (29.5)	3.7 (38.7)	11.6 (52.9)	18.8 (65.8)	23.7 (74.7)	26.3 (79.3)	25.1 (77.2)	19.9 (67.8)	13.2 (55.8)	5.8 (42.4)	−0.3 (31.5)	12.0 (53.6)
Daily mean °C (°F)	−7.0 (19.4)	−5.9 (21.4)	−1.4 (29.5)	6.1 (43.0)	12.4 (54.3)	17.3 (63.1)	19.9 (67.8)	19.1 (66.4)	14.3 (57.7)	8.1 (46.6)	2.1 (35.8)	−3.9 (25.0)	6.7 (44.1)
Mean daily minimum °C (°F)	−11.2 (11.8)	−10.4 (13.3)	−6.6 (20.1)	0.5 (32.9)	5.9 (42.6)	10.9 (51.6)	13.5 (56.3)	13.0 (55.4)	8.6 (47.5)	2.9 (37.2)	−1.7 (28.9)	−7.4 (18.7)	1.5 (34.7)
Record low °C (°F)	−36.5 (−33.7)	−35.0 (−31.0)	−31.5 (−24.7)	−21.1 (−6.0)	−6.1 (21.0)	−1.5 (29.3)	1.7 (35.1)	−0.5 (31.1)	−5.0 (23.0)	−11.5 (11.3)	−19.0 (−2.2)	−32.0 (−25.6)	−36.5 (−33.7)
Average precipitation mm (inches)	60.4 (2.38)	50.2 (1.98)	50.3 (1.98)	67.0 (2.64)	76.1 (3.00)	75.5 (2.97)	81.8 (3.22)	77.4 (3.05)	75.0 (2.95)	68.3 (2.69)	81.7 (3.22)	57.7 (2.27)	821.5 (32.34)
Average rainfall mm (inches)	24.0 (0.94)	22.2 (0.87)	27.3 (1.07)	63.0 (2.48)	76.1 (3.00)	75.5 (2.97)	81.8 (3.22)	77.4 (3.05)	75.0 (2.95)	64.9 (2.56)	67.8 (2.67)	25.9 (1.02)	681.0 (26.81)
Average snowfall cm (inches)	36.4 (14.3)	28.0 (11.0)	23.0 (9.1)	4.0 (1.6)	0.0 (0.0)	0.0 (0.0)	0.0 (0.0)	0.0 (0.0)	0.0 (0.0)	3.4 (1.3)	13.8 (5.4)	31.9 (12.6)	140.5 (55.3)
Average precipitation days (≥ 0.2 mm)	12.4	9.4	9.6	10.8	10.3	10.2	9.0	9.8	10.8	11.3	12.1	9.8	125.5
Average rainy days (≥ 0.2 mm)	3.3	3.6	5.2	9.9	10.3	10.2	9.0	9.8	10.8	11.2	9.3	3.7	96.2
Average snowy days (≥ 0.2 cm)	9.8	6.4	5.3	1.4	0.1	0.0	0.0	0.0	0.0	0.6	4.0	6.8	34.3
Source: Environment and Climate Change Canada

Climate data for Markham (Buttonville at Toronto Buttonville Airport) WMO ID: 71639; coordinates 43°51′44″N 79°22′12″W; elevation: 198.1 m (650 ft); 1991–2020 normals, extremes 1895–present (Note: Long term records have been recorded at various climate stations in or nearby Markham since 1895. From 1895 to 1908 at Toronto Agincourt, 1908 to 1918 at Aurora, 1918 to 1959 at Oak Ridges, 1959 to 1986 at Richmond Hill and 1986 to present at Toronto Buttonville Airport)
Month	Jan	Feb	Mar	Apr	May	Jun	Jul	Aug	Sep	Oct	Nov	Dec	Year
Record high humidex	16.0	18.0	29.2	35.7	41.0	46.0	50.9	47.4	44.2	38.0	25.8	20.6	50.9
Record high °C (°F)	14.9 (58.8)	17.3 (63.1)	26.3 (79.3)	31.7 (89.1)	34.6 (94.3)	36.6 (97.9)	40.0 (104.0)	37.8 (100.0)	35.6 (96.1)	31.0 (87.8)	23.8 (74.8)	20.0 (68.0)	40.0 (104.0)
Mean daily maximum °C (°F)	−1.7 (28.9)	−1.0 (30.2)	4.6 (40.3)	11.8 (53.2)	19.3 (66.7)	24.6 (76.3)	27.3 (81.1)	26.3 (79.3)	21.9 (71.4)	14.3 (57.7)	7.4 (45.3)	1.5 (34.7)	13.0 (55.4)
Daily mean °C (°F)	−6.0 (21.2)	−5.6 (21.9)	−0.2 (31.6)	6.5 (43.7)	13.4 (56.1)	18.8 (65.8)	21.5 (70.7)	20.6 (69.1)	16.2 (61.2)	9.4 (48.9)	3.3 (37.9)	−2.2 (28.0)	8.0 (46.4)
Mean daily minimum °C (°F)	−10.1 (13.8)	−10.1 (13.8)	−5.0 (23.0)	1.2 (34.2)	7.4 (45.3)	13.0 (55.4)	15.6 (60.1)	14.8 (58.6)	10.4 (50.7)	4.3 (39.7)	−0.8 (30.6)	−5.8 (21.6)	2.9 (37.2)
Record low °C (°F)	−35.2 (−31.4)	−34.4 (−29.9)	−26.1 (−15.0)	−15.6 (3.9)	−5.6 (21.9)	0.0 (32.0)	2.2 (36.0)	1.1 (34.0)	−3.3 (26.1)	−9.4 (15.1)	−20.6 (−5.1)	−33.9 (−29.0)	−35.2 (−31.4)
Record low wind chill	−42.6	−41.7	−35.6	−18.6	−7.9	0.0	0.0	0.0	−4.2	−8.8	−23.9	−36.6	−42.6
Average precipitation mm (inches)	63.5 (2.50)	51.1 (2.01)	52.3 (2.06)	78.9 (3.11)	80.0 (3.15)	86.7 (3.41)	85.2 (3.35)	71.9 (2.83)	83.1 (3.27)	70.6 (2.78)	76.7 (3.02)	62.5 (2.46)	862.4 (33.95)
Average rainfall mm (inches)	27.6 (1.09)	21.0 (0.83)	32.8 (1.29)	71.8 (2.83)	79.9 (3.15)	86.7 (3.41)	85.2 (3.35)	71.9 (2.83)	83.1 (3.27)	70.1 (2.76)	65.5 (2.58)	33.4 (1.31)	728.9 (28.70)
Average snowfall cm (inches)	40.3 (15.9)	33.9 (13.3)	19.7 (7.8)	7.2 (2.8)	0.1 (0.0)	0.0 (0.0)	0.0 (0.0)	0.0 (0.0)	0.0 (0.0)	0.6 (0.2)	11.7 (4.6)	32.8 (12.9)	146.4 (57.6)
Average precipitation days (≥ 0.2 mm)	17.0	13.1	12.0	12.6	12.3	11.6	11.2	10.0	10.5	13.3	14.3	15.5	153.5
Average rainy days (≥ 0.2 mm)	5.5	3.7	6.5	11.2	12.3	11.6	11.2	10.0	10.5	13.2	10.9	6.8	113.4
Average snowy days (≥ 0.2 cm)	14.2	11.0	7.2	2.8	0.13	0.0	0.0	0.0	0.0	0.42	4.8	10.6	51.1
Average relative humidity (%) (at 1500 LST)	68.3	63.5	57.7	52.9	52.8	53.9	52.9	55.2	57.6	62.1	66.8	70.4	59.5
Source: Environment and Climate Change Canada

Climate data for Richmond Hill Climate ID: 6157012; coordinates 43°52′38″N 79°26′52″W; elevation: 240 m (790 ft); 1981–2010 normals
Month	Jan	Feb	Mar	Apr	May	Jun	Jul	Aug	Sep	Oct	Nov	Dec	Year
Record high °C (°F)	14.5 (58.1)	14.5 (58.1)	25.5 (77.9)	31.0 (87.8)	34.5 (94.1)	35.0 (95.0)	37.0 (98.6)	37.0 (98.6)	34.4 (93.9)	29.4 (84.9)	23.3 (73.9)	20.0 (68.0)	37.0 (98.6)
Mean daily maximum °C (°F)	−2.2 (28.0)	−0.6 (30.9)	4.4 (39.9)	12.1 (53.8)	19.0 (66.2)	24.2 (75.6)	26.8 (80.2)	25.6 (78.1)	20.9 (69.6)	13.7 (56.7)	6.7 (44.1)	0.8 (33.4)	12.6 (54.7)
Daily mean °C (°F)	−6.2 (20.8)	−4.9 (23.2)	−0.3 (31.5)	6.9 (44.4)	13.3 (55.9)	18.7 (65.7)	21.4 (70.5)	20.3 (68.5)	15.9 (60.6)	9.1 (48.4)	3.1 (37.6)	−2.7 (27.1)	7.9 (46.2)
Mean daily minimum °C (°F)	−10.2 (13.6)	−9.1 (15.6)	−5 (23)	1.7 (35.1)	7.7 (45.9)	13.1 (55.6)	15.9 (60.6)	15.1 (59.2)	10.8 (51.4)	4.5 (40.1)	−0.5 (31.1)	−6.1 (21.0)	3.2 (37.8)
Record low °C (°F)	−32.5 (−26.5)	−29 (−20)	−27 (−17)	−15 (5)	−5.6 (21.9)	0.6 (33.1)	4.4 (39.9)	3.0 (37.4)	−3.3 (26.1)	−7.8 (18.0)	−15.5 (4.1)	−30 (−22)	−32.5 (−26.5)
Average precipitation mm (inches)	62.3 (2.45)	58.0 (2.28)	58.8 (2.31)	70.1 (2.76)	81.6 (3.21)	80.2 (3.16)	83.5 (3.29)	89.2 (3.51)	88.4 (3.48)	69.1 (2.72)	87.2 (3.43)	66.8 (2.63)	895.2 (35.24)
Average rainfall mm (inches)	25.2 (0.99)	26.3 (1.04)	33.6 (1.32)	62.5 (2.46)	81.5 (3.21)	80.2 (3.16)	83.5 (3.29)	89.2 (3.51)	88.4 (3.48)	67.6 (2.66)	73.5 (2.89)	33.1 (1.30)	744.6 (29.31)
Average snowfall cm (inches)	37.1 (14.6)	31.7 (12.5)	25.2 (9.9)	7.6 (3.0)	0.1 (0.0)	0.0 (0.0)	0.0 (0.0)	0.0 (0.0)	0.0 (0.0)	1.5 (0.6)	13.7 (5.4)	33.7 (13.3)	150.6 (59.3)
Average precipitation days (≥ 0.2 mm)	18.3	13.9	14.4	13.6	13.6	11.9	11.3	11.2	12.4	13.4	15.2	16.2	165.2
Average rainy days (≥ 0.2 mm)	4.9	4.3	7.4	11.7	13.6	11.9	11.3	11.2	12.4	13.3	11.4	7.0	120.2
Average snowy days (≥ 0.2 cm)	15.3	11.3	9.0	3.2	0.12	0.0	0.0	0.0	0.0	0.62	5.3	11.6	56.5
Source: Environment and Climate Change Canada

Climate data for Stouffville Climate ID: 6158084; coordinates 43°58′N 79°15′W; elevation: 266.7 m (875 ft), 1971–2000 normals, extremes 1971–1993
Month	Jan	Feb	Mar	Apr	May	Jun	Jul	Aug	Sep	Oct	Nov	Dec	Year
Record high °C (°F)	11.0 (51.8)	13.5 (56.3)	23.0 (73.4)	30.5 (86.9)	32.0 (89.6)	34.0 (93.2)	35.5 (95.9)	36.5 (97.7)	32.8 (91.0)	25.5 (77.9)	22.8 (73.0)	18.0 (64.4)	36.5 (97.7)
Mean daily maximum °C (°F)	−3.2 (26.2)	−2.4 (27.7)	3.1 (37.6)	11.1 (52.0)	18.5 (65.3)	23.1 (73.6)	26.2 (79.2)	24.7 (76.5)	19.9 (67.8)	12.8 (55.0)	6.0 (42.8)	−0.6 (30.9)	11.6 (52.9)
Mean daily minimum °C (°F)	−11.6 (11.1)	−10.9 (12.4)	−5.7 (21.7)	1.2 (34.2)	7.4 (45.3)	11.8 (53.2)	14.8 (58.6)	14 (57)	9.6 (49.3)	3.5 (38.3)	−1.0 (30.2)	−7.7 (18.1)	2.1 (35.8)
Record low °C (°F)	−35.5 (−31.9)	−28.3 (−18.9)	−28.0 (−18.4)	−17.0 (1.4)	−3.3 (26.1)	0.0 (32.0)	7.0 (44.6)	2.5 (36.5)	−2.0 (28.4)	−7.2 (19.0)	−15.0 (5.0)	−31.5 (−24.7)	−35.5 (−31.9)
Average precipitation mm (inches)	52.8 (2.08)	53.5 (2.11)	62.8 (2.47)	65.5 (2.58)	81.2 (3.20)	73.3 (2.89)	75.8 (2.98)	99.3 (3.91)	79.2 (3.12)	81.2 (3.20)	78.5 (3.09)	65.6 (2.58)	868.6 (34.20)
Average rainfall mm (inches)	17.9 (0.70)	23.3 (0.92)	43.5 (1.71)	60.5 (2.38)	81.1 (3.19)	73.3 (2.89)	75.8 (2.98)	99.3 (3.91)	79.2 (3.12)	80.6 (3.17)	70.3 (2.77)	33.0 (1.30)	737.7 (29.04)
Average snowfall cm (inches)	34.9 (13.7)	30.2 (11.9)	19.3 (7.6)	5.0 (2.0)	0.1 (0.0)	0.0 (0.0)	0.0 (0.0)	0.0 (0.0)	0.0 (0.0)	0.6 (0.2)	8.2 (3.2)	32.7 (12.9)	131.0 (51.6)
Average precipitation days (≥ 0.2 mm)	11.0	10.3	10.1	10.8	11.0	10.7	9.2	10.8	10.4	13.0	12.6	12.3	131.9
Average rainy days (≥ 0.2 mm)	2.9	3.1	6.2	9.8	11.0	10.7	9.2	10.8	10.4	13.0	10.7	5.1	102.6
Average snowy days (≥ 0.2 cm)	8.4	7.7	4.7	1.2	0.1	0.0	0.0	0.0	0.0	0.2	2.6	8.3	33.1
Source: Environment and Climate Change Canada

Climate data for Woodbridge (Vaughan) Climate ID: 6159575; coordinates 43°47′N 79°36′W; elevation: 164 m (538 ft); 1981–2010 normals, 1948–2005
Month	Jan	Feb	Mar	Apr	May	Jun	Jul	Aug	Sep	Oct	Nov	Dec	Year
Record high °C (°F)	17.0 (62.6)	15.5 (59.9)	26.5 (79.7)	31.5 (88.7)	33.0 (91.4)	36.0 (96.8)	39.0 (102.2)	37.2 (99.0)	36.1 (97.0)	30.6 (87.1)	25.0 (77.0)	19.5 (67.1)	39.0 (102.2)
Mean daily maximum °C (°F)	−2.5 (27.5)	−0.5 (31.1)	4.3 (39.7)	12.0 (53.6)	18.8 (65.8)	24.1 (75.4)	26.9 (80.4)	25.4 (77.7)	20.9 (69.6)	13.9 (57.0)	6.9 (44.4)	0.8 (33.4)	12.6 (54.7)
Daily mean °C (°F)	−6.6 (20.1)	−4.8 (23.4)	−0.4 (31.3)	6.6 (43.9)	12.9 (55.2)	18.1 (64.6)	20.8 (69.4)	19.6 (67.3)	15.4 (59.7)	9.0 (48.2)	3.1 (37.6)	−2.8 (27.0)	7.6 (45.7)
Mean daily minimum °C (°F)	−10.7 (12.7)	−9.2 (15.4)	−5.2 (22.6)	1.2 (34.2)	6.8 (44.2)	12.0 (53.6)	14.7 (58.5)	13.8 (56.8)	9.8 (49.6)	4.0 (39.2)	−0.8 (30.6)	−6.4 (20.5)	2.5 (36.5)
Record low °C (°F)	−34.5 (−30.1)	−30.0 (−22.0)	−29.4 (−20.9)	−17.2 (1.0)	−6.7 (19.9)	−1.7 (28.9)	2.8 (37.0)	−0.6 (30.9)	−5.0 (23.0)	−11.7 (10.9)	−18.3 (−0.9)	−30.0 (−22.0)	−34.5 (−30.1)
Average precipitation mm (inches)	50.3 (1.98)	44.2 (1.74)	49.2 (1.94)	63.3 (2.49)	79.1 (3.11)	76.3 (3.00)	70.4 (2.77)	80.4 (3.17)	84.6 (3.33)	66.5 (2.62)	78.3 (3.08)	57.4 (2.26)	799.8 (31.49)
Average rainfall mm (inches)	20.4 (0.80)	23.2 (0.91)	31.4 (1.24)	59.6 (2.35)	79.1 (3.11)	76.3 (3.00)	70.4 (2.77)	80.4 (3.17)	84.6 (3.33)	66.0 (2.60)	71.1 (2.80)	34.6 (1.36)	697.0 (27.44)
Average snowfall cm (inches)	29.9 (11.8)	21.1 (8.3)	17.8 (7.0)	3.7 (1.5)	0.0 (0.0)	0.0 (0.0)	0.0 (0.0)	0.0 (0.0)	0.0 (0.0)	0.45 (0.18)	7.2 (2.8)	22.8 (9.0)	102.8 (40.5)
Average precipitation days (≥ 0.2 mm)	13.5	10.3	10.7	11.8	12.0	10.8	9.5	9.6	10.6	12.7	13.1	12.8	137.4
Average rainy days (≥ 0.2 mm)	4.2	4.4	6.4	10.7	12.0	10.8	9.5	9.6	10.6	12.6	11.1	6.5	108.3
Average snowy days (≥ 0.2 cm)	10.2	6.8	5.1	1.5	0.0	0.0	0.0	0.0	0.0	0.23	3.0	7.5	34.3
Source: Environment and Climate Change Canada

== Economy ==
The Greater Toronto Area is a commercial, distribution, financial and economic centre and is the second-largest financial centre in North America. The region generates about a fifth of Canada's GDP and is home to 40 per cent of Canada's corporate headquarters. The economies of the municipalities in Greater Toronto are largely intertwined. The work force is made up of approximately 2.9 million people and more than 100,000 companies The Greater Toronto Area produces nearly 20 per cent of the entire nation's GDP with $323 billion, and from 1992 to 2002, experienced an average GDP growth rate of 4.0 per cent and a job creation rate of 2.4 per cent (compared with the national average GDP growth rate of 3 per cent and job creation rate of 1.6 per cent). The Greater Toronto Area has the largest regional economy in Canada, with its GDP surpassing the province of Quebec in 2015.

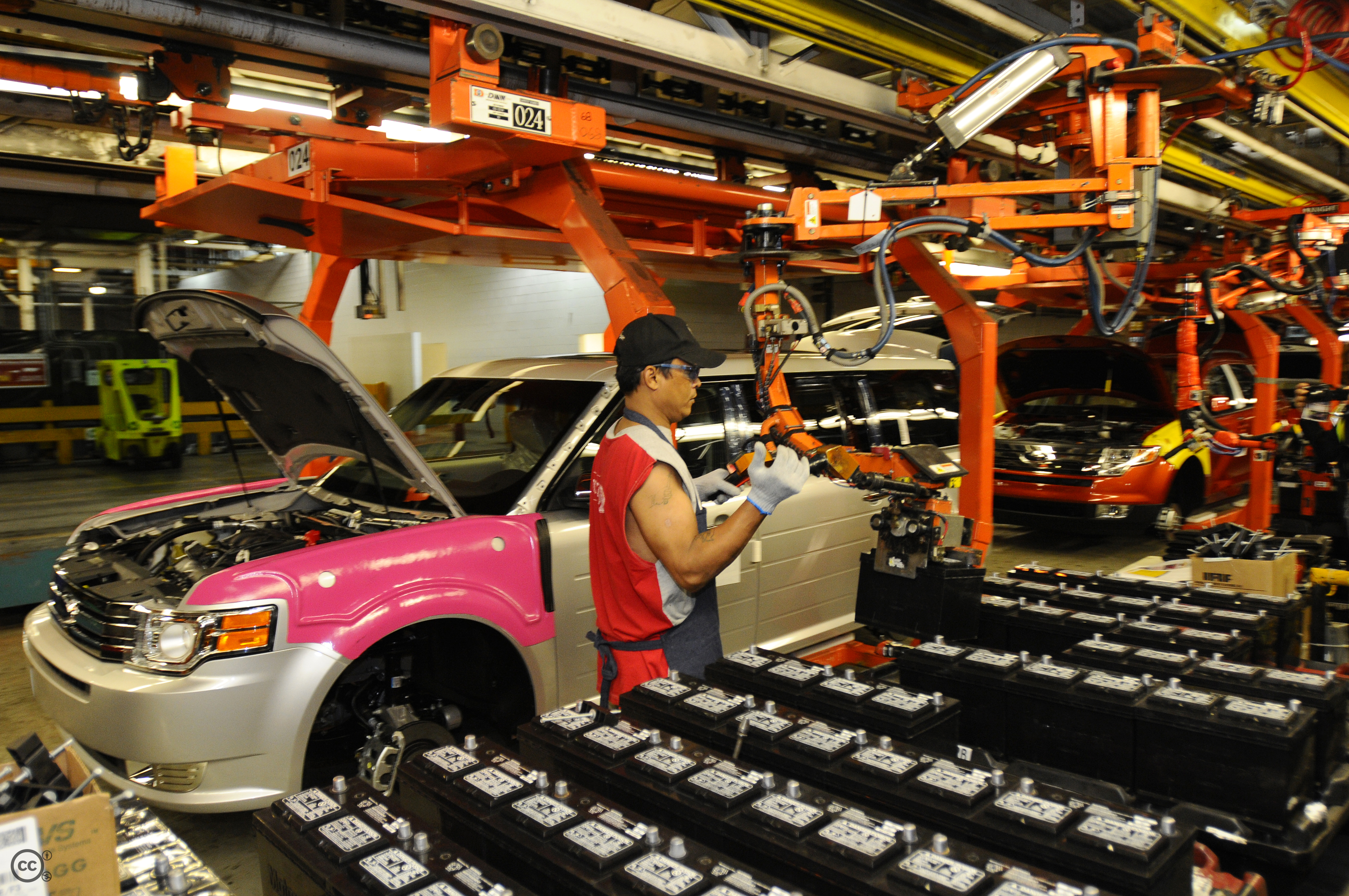
A worker at Oakville Assembly installs a battery on a Ford Flex. In 2010, the automotive industry accounted for roughly 10 per cent of Greater Toronto's GDP.

In 2010, over 51 per cent of the labour force in the Greater Toronto Area is employed in the service sector, with 19 per cent in the manufacturing, 17 per cent of the labour force employed in wholesale & retail trade, 8% of the labour force involved in transportation, communication and utilities, and 5% of the workforce is involved in construction. Although the service industry makes up only 51% of Greater Toronto's workforce, over 72% of the region's GDP is generated by service industries.

The largest industry in the Greater Toronto Area is the financial services in the province, accounting for an estimated 25% of the region's GDP. Notably, the five largest banks in Canada all have their operational headquarters in Toronto's Financial District. Toronto is also home to the headquarters of the Toronto Stock Exchange and the Standard and Poor TSX Composite Index and offices of the TSX Venture Exchange. The TMX Group, the owners and operators of TSX Exchanges as well as the Montreal Exchange, are also headquartered in Toronto. The TSX and the TSX Venture Exchange represent 3,369 companies, including more than half of the world's publicly traded mining companies.

Markham also attracted the highest concentration of high tech companies in Canada, and because of it, has positioned itself as Canada's High-Tech Capital. The Greater Toronto Area is the second-largest automotive centre in North America (after Detroit). Currently, General Motors, Ford and Chrysler run six assembly plants in the area, with Honda and Toyota having assembly plants just outside the GTA. General Motors, Ford, Honda, KIA, Mazda, Suzuki, Nissan, Volkswagen, Toyota, Hyundai, Aston Martin, Jaguar, Land Rover, Subaru, Volvo, BMW, and Mitsubishi have chosen the Greater Toronto Area for their Canadian headquarters. Magna International, the world's most diversified car supplier, also has its headquarters in Aurora. The automobile industry accounts for roughly 10% of the region's GDP.

=== Agriculture ===
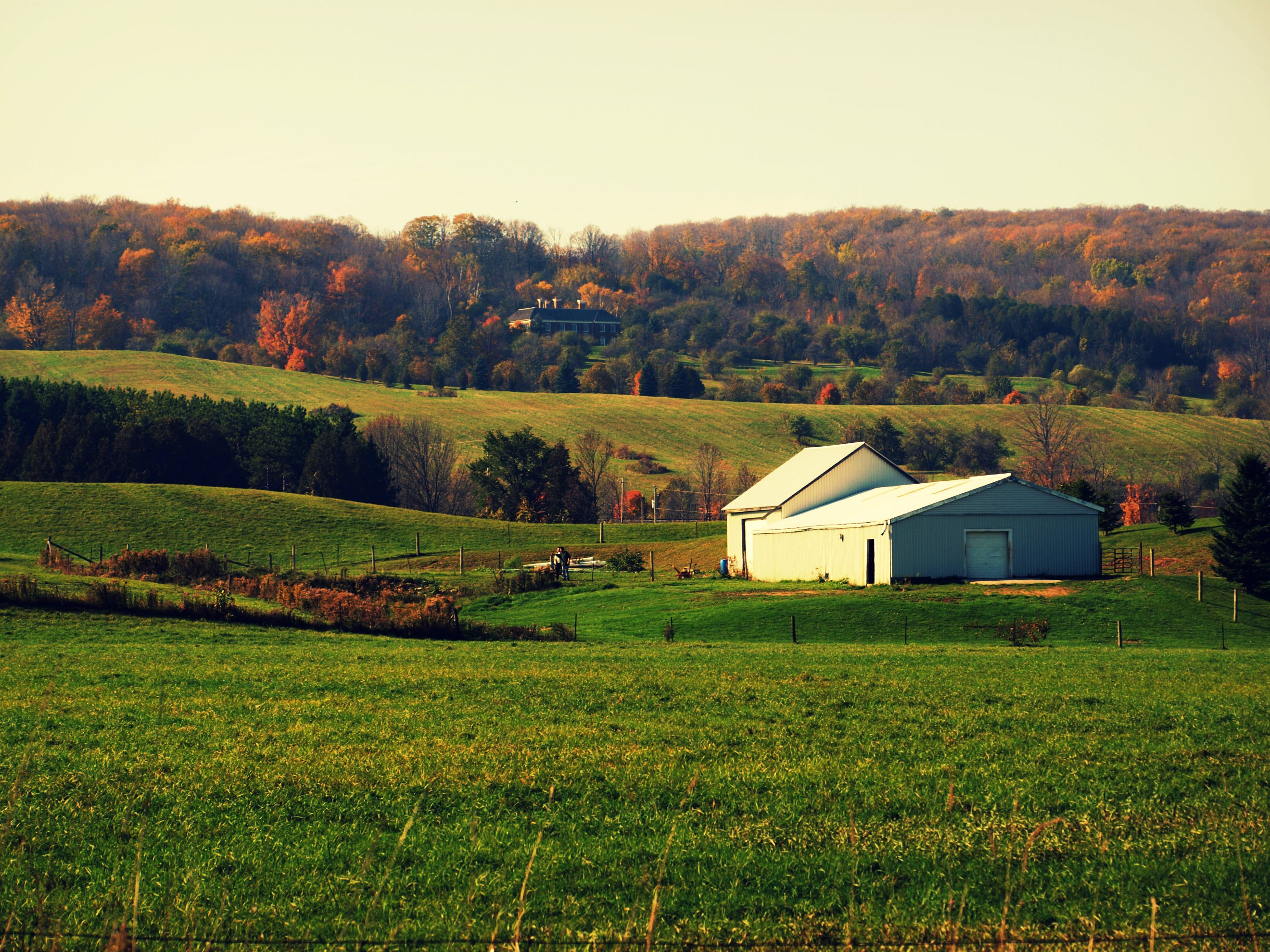
A farm in Caledon. There were 3,707 farms in the Greater Toronto Area according to the 2006 census.

While it was once the most dominant industry for residents in the Greater Toronto Area, agriculture now occupies a small percentage of the population though it is still a large part of land in the surrounding four regional municipalities. Census data from 2006 has shown there are 3,707 census farms in the GTA, down 4.2 per cent from 2001 and covering 274,363 ha (677,970 acres). Almost every community in the GTA is currently experiencing a decrease in the acreage of farmland, with Mississauga seeing the most significant one. The only communities in the GTA that are experiencing a growth in the acreage of farmland are Aurora, Georgina, Newmarket, Oshawa, Richmond Hill, and Scugog, with Markham experiencing no growth or decline. Most of the GTA's farmland is in Durham Region, with 55 per cent of their total land area being farmland. This is followed by York Region with 41 per cent of their lands being farmland, Peel Region with 34 per cent, and Halton Region with 41 per cent. Toronto's remaining farmland is completely within Rouge Park in the Rouge Valley. The average size of the farm in the GTA (74 hectares [183 acres]) is much lower than the farms in the rest of Ontario (averaging 94 hectares [233 acres]). This has been attributed to the shift of farm types in the GTA from the traditional livestock and cash crop farms (requiring an extensive land base), towards more intensive enterprises including greenhouse, floriculture, nursery, vegetable, fruit, sheep and goats.

The most numerous farm types in the GTA are miscellaneous specialty farms (including horse and pony, sheep and lamb, and other livestock specialty), followed by cattle, grain and oilseed, dairy and field crop farms. Although the output of dairy production has dropped with farms from within the GTA, dairy has remained the most productive sector in the agricultural industry by annual gross farm receipts. Despite the decreased amount of farmland around the region, farm capital value increased from $5.2 billion in 1996 to $6.1 billion in 2001, making the average farm capital value in the GTA continued to be the highest in the province.

== Infrastructure ==
=== Transportation ===
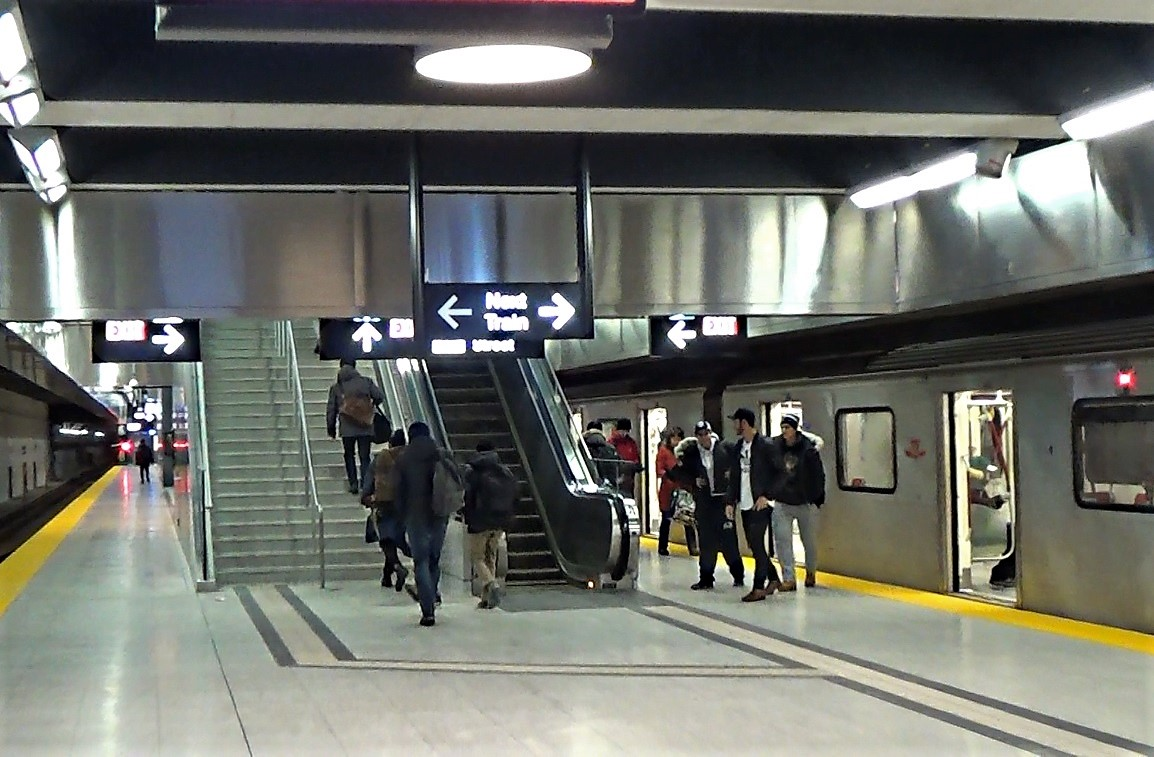
The Vaughan Metropolitan Centre station of the Toronto subway. The expansion of Line 1 Yonge–University in 2017 resulted in the first stations built outside the City of Toronto's post-1998 limits.

There are several public transportation operators within the Greater Toronto Area that provide services within their jurisdictions. While those operators are largely independent, provisions are being made to integrate them under Metrolinx, which manages transportation planning including public transport in the Greater Toronto and Hamilton Area. GO Transit, which merged with Metrolinx during the late 2000s, is Ontario's only intra-regional public transit service, linking the communities in the GTA and the city of Hamilton, as well as the rest of the Greater Golden Horseshoe. The implementation of the Presto card by Metrolinx has created a common means for all fare payments and allows for seamless connection between these and other transit operators.

Public transit operators in the GTA include Brampton Transit, Burlington Transit, Durham Region Transit, GO Transit, Milton Transit, MiWay (serving Mississauga), Oakville Transit, Toronto Transit Commission (TTC), and York Region Transit. The TTC operates the Toronto subway system, which consists of three heavy rail lines and runs in Toronto and in Vaughan, the latter of which began to be served by the system in December 2017 with an extension of Line 1 Yonge–University to Vaughan Metropolitan Centre station on Highway 7 at Jane Street; the subway system also consists of two light rail lines: Line 5 Eglinton and Line 6 Finch West.

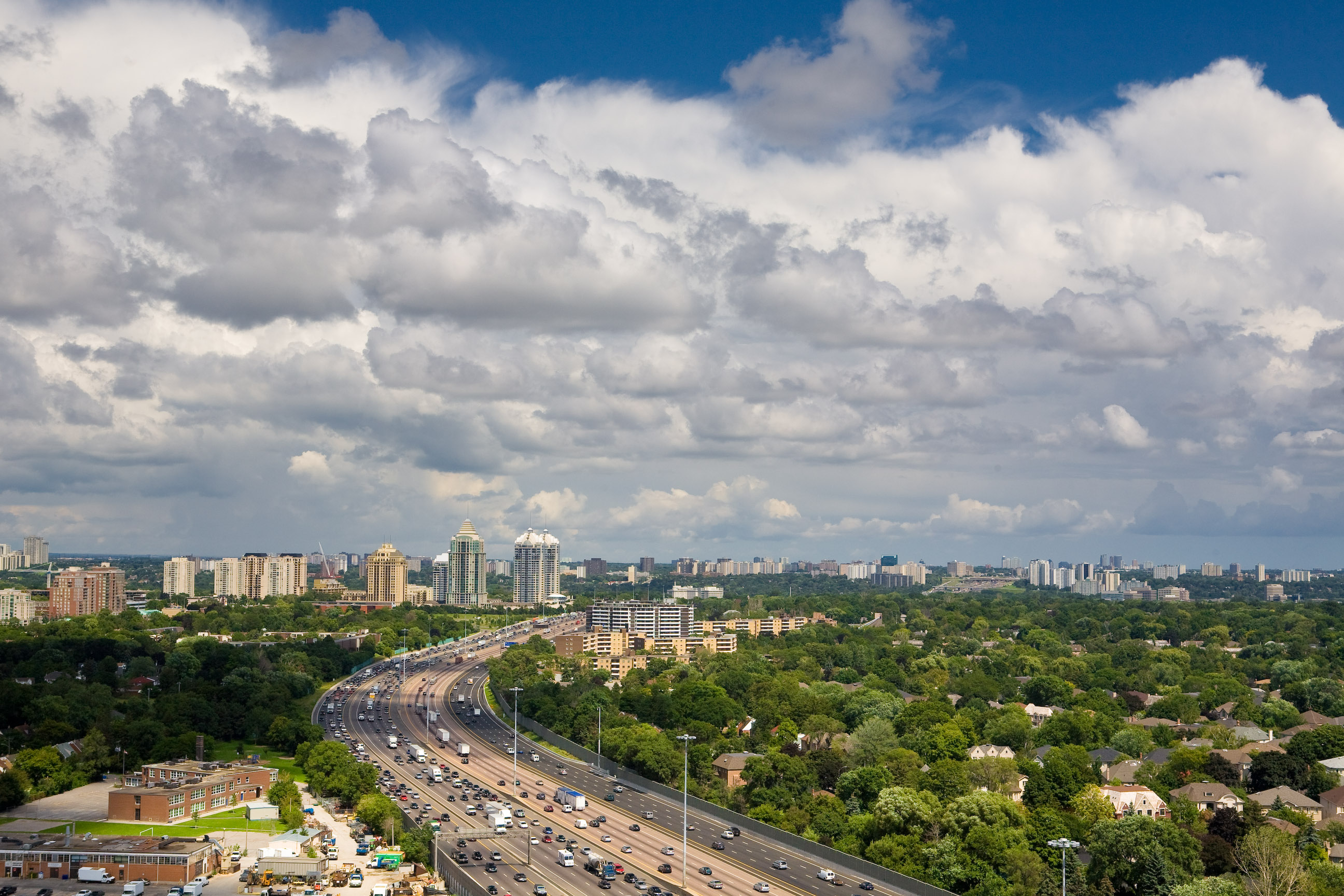
Highway 401 serves as a major roadway in the Greater Toronto Area.

The GTA also consists of several King's Highways and is supplemented by municipal expressways. One of the principal highways in the GTA, Highway 401, is also the longest in Ontario and is also one of the widest and busiest highways in the world. Notably, a segment of the highway passing through the GTA is North America's busiest highway. The GTA is laced with a number of limited-access highways including the 400-series highways. These include:

Note: "York", "Peel", "Durham" and "Halton" here refer to the regional municipalities.

- Highway 400 – York, Toronto
- Highway 401 – Durham, Toronto, Peel, Halton
- Highway 403 – Peel, Halton
- Highway 404 – York, Toronto
- / 407 ETR / Highway 407 – Durham, Peel, York, Halton (toll route)
- Highway 409 – Toronto, Peel
- Highway 410 – Peel
- Highway 412 – Durham
- Highway 418 – Durham
- Highway 427 – York, Toronto, Peel
- Queen Elizabeth Way – Peel, Halton, Toronto
- Gardiner Expressway – Toronto
- Don Valley Parkway – Toronto
- William R. Allen Road – Toronto

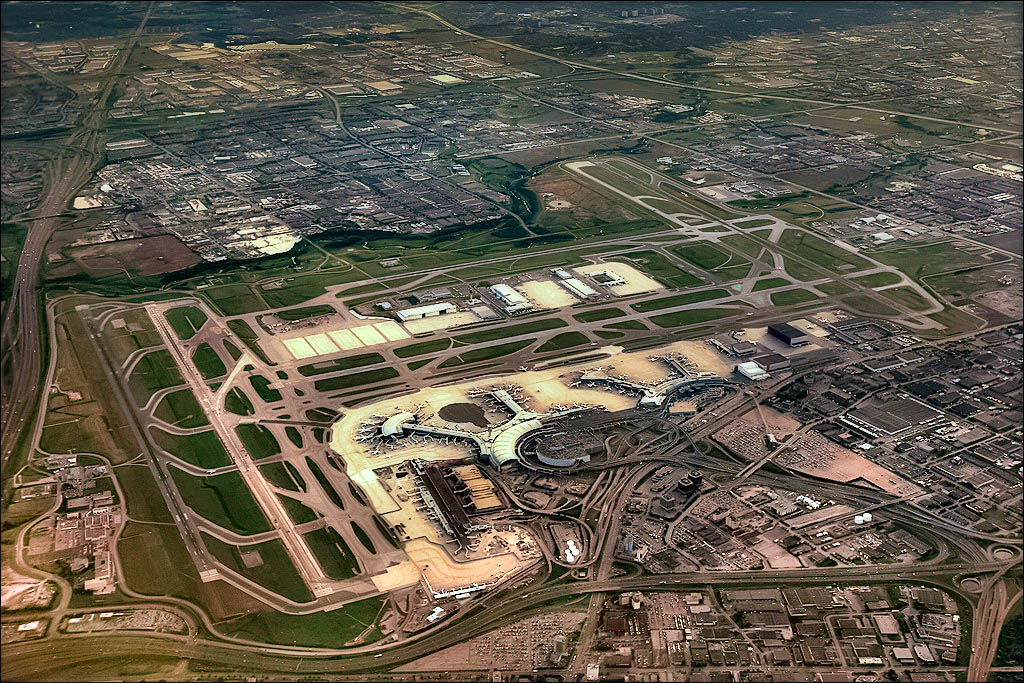
The Toronto Pearson International Airport in Mississauga is the GTA's primary airport, and ranks among the world's busiest airports.

The main airport serving the GTA is Toronto Pearson International Airport in Mississauga, which is Canada's largest and busiest airport. It processed over 47 million passengers in 2017 and nearly 50 million passengers in 2018. Toronto Pearson International Airport is operated by the Greater Toronto Airports Authority (GTAA). John C. Munro Hamilton International Airport in nearby Hamilton also handles international flights, handles some discount flights and charters, and acts as an alternative to Pearson. The Billy Bishop Toronto City Airport, on the Toronto Islands near downtown, is used for civil aviation, air ambulance traffic and regional scheduled airlines (it handled nearly two million passengers in 2012). There are also a number of smaller airports scattered throughout the GTA. The International Air Transport Association (IATA) uses YTO as a code for multiple airports in the area, including those without passenger service.

The Greater Toronto Airport Authority has also placed a tentative proposal to develop a new airport in Pickering, which would also extend over into Markham and Uxbridge. As the GTAA predicts Toronto Pearson would be unable to be the sole provider for the bulk of Toronto's commercial air traffic in the next 20 years from the report's publication in 2004 (i.e. in 2024), it believes that a new airport in Pickering would address the need for a regional/reliever airport east of Toronto Pearson and complement the airport in Hamilton, Ontario. The GTAA also stated the new airport would create more opportunities for economic development in the eastern region of the Greater Toronto Area. However, demand for the new airport lessened because of the COVID-19 pandemic and its aftermath, as well as the planned Alto high-speed rail network, which would eliminate many short-haul flights along the route between Toronto and Quebec City.

The region also has significant maritime infrastructure being on the Great Lakes-St. Lawrence Seaway system. The Port of Oshawa and Port of Toronto handle between 2 and 4 million tonnes of cargo annually. The Port of Toronto also has an International Marine Passenger Terminal, which had 12,000 cruise passengers in 2019.

=== Communication ===
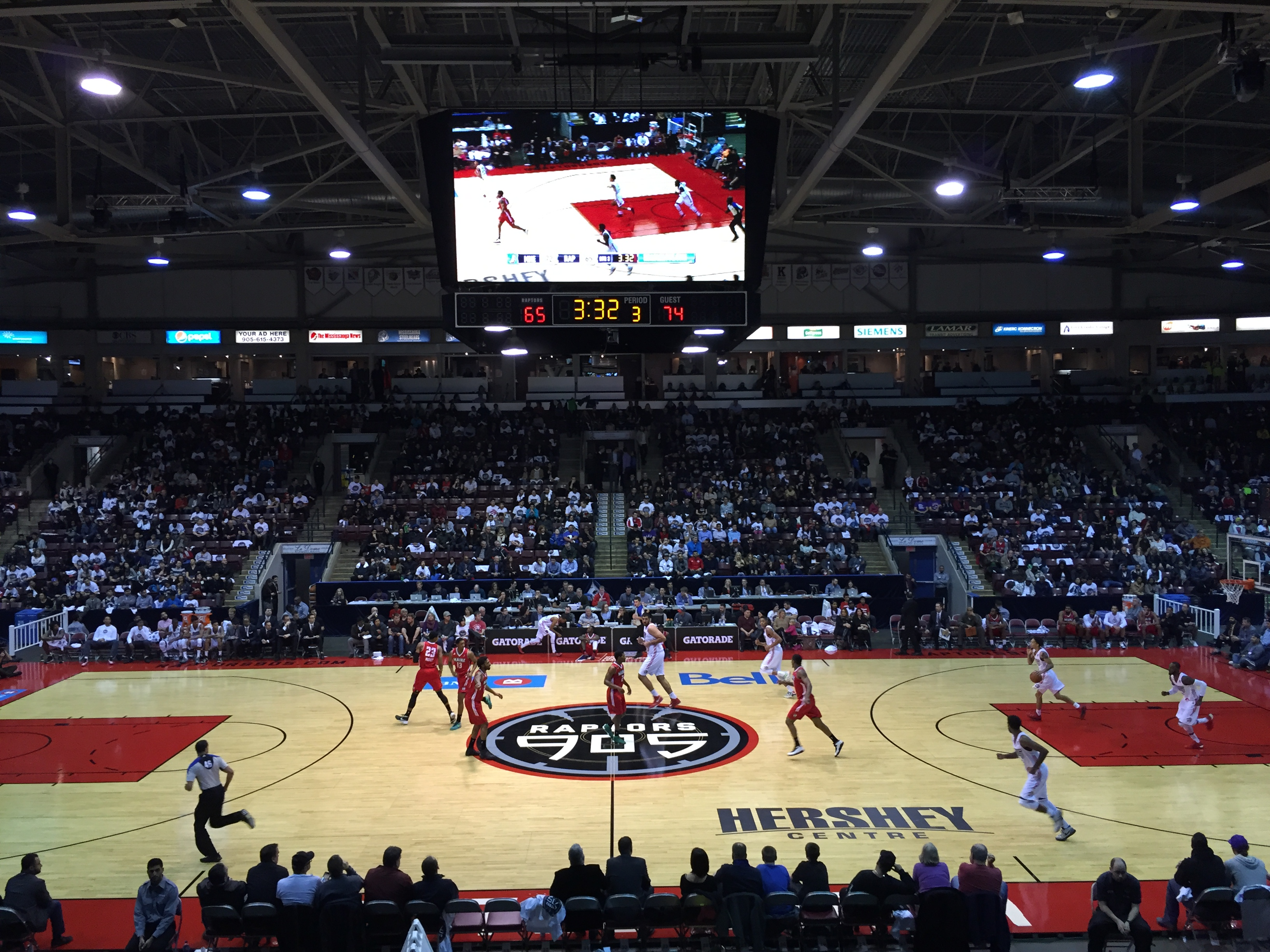
One of the most notable uses of area code 905 as a geographical region is the Raptors 905 of the NBA G League as they play at Mississauga Sports and Entertainment Centre in Mississauga for their regular home games.

The Greater Toronto Area is served by seven distinct telephone area codes. Before 1993, the GTA used the 416 area code. In a 1993 zone split, Metropolitan Toronto retained the 416 code, while the other municipalities of the Greater Toronto Area were assigned the new area code 905. This division by area code has become part of the local culture to the point where local media refer to something inside Toronto as "the 416" and outside of Toronto as "the 905". For example, the Raptors 905 basketball team in the NBA G League is named after the area code the team represents. Though for the most part, the use of the area 905 as shorthand for the suburban areas outside Toronto city limits was correct, it is not entirely true as some portions of Durham and York Regions use the 705 area code. Furthermore, there are areas, such as Hamilton, the Regional Municipality of Niagara and Port Hope (in Northumberland County) that use the 905 area code, but are not part of the GTA. The unincorporated community of Acton (in Halton Hills), is the only community in the GTA that uses the 519 area code, which covers most of Southwestern Ontario.

To meet the increased demand for phone numbers, two overlay area codes were introduced in 2001. Area code 647 (supplementing the 416 area code) was introduced in March 2001 and area code 289 (supplementing the 905 area code) was introduced in July 2001. Some individuals within the 905 area code region may have to dial long distance to reach each other; although residents of Mississauga and Hamilton share the same area code (905), an individual from Toronto, for example, would have to dial "1" to reach Hamilton, but not to reach Mississauga. Ten-digit telephone dialling, including the area code for local calls, is required throughout the GTA. In March 2013, two additional area codes were introduced to the GTA: area code 437 in Toronto and area code 365 in the area served by 905 and 289. More overlaid area codes have been added since then.

== Government ==
Since the 2015 election, the Greater Toronto Area has been represented by 58 Members of Parliament in the House of Commons of Canada. Forty-six Members of the Provincial Parliament also represent the GTA in the Ontario Legislature. Five Senators from Ontario have also designated themselves as representatives of certain areas in the GTA in the Canadian Senate.

=== Federal politics ===
Federally, the Conservatives, Liberals, and the New Democrats (NDP) all hold several electoral districts in the GTA. The City of Toronto has often been supportive of the Liberal Party. Traditionally, Liberal support is strongest in Downtown Toronto, while Conservative support is stronger in the surrounding communities outside Toronto. The NDP also has a strong base within the GTA. The Greater Toronto Area has the ability to influence election results and determine the governing party in Canada, due in part to its large population and riding count.

From 1993 to 2011, a centre-right party failed to win a single seat in the former Metro Toronto. In the 2011 election, however, a surge in NDP support combined with a collapse in Liberal support allowed the Conservatives to win eight seats in Toronto itself, and another 24 in the suburbs. Toronto's political leanings now appeared to mirror those of surrounding communities that leaned toward the Conservatives.

The election of 2011 showed Liberal support, based on votes in the GTA, had collapsed from 43.7% to 30.6%, giving the Liberals only 14.9% of the local seats in the House of Commons. However, the support of the Conservatives and NDP increased accordingly, with the Conservatives increasing their vote share from 31.5% to 42.2% (and capturing 68.1% of the GTA seats) and the NDP increasing from 14.6% to 23.2% of the vote and 17% of the local Federal ridings.

In the 2015 federal election, the Liberals regained their dominance of the GTA after suffering devastating losses there four years earlier. They defeated a number of prominent incumbents from both the NDP and the Conservatives. The Liberals took all of Toronto itself. They also took back almost all of the suburban ridings they had lost in 2011. Both the NDP and the Conservatives suffered heavily as their support collapsed in the inner city and the suburbs respectively. Only a few Conservatives held onto their seats in the outer ring of the GTA, while the NDP failed to elect any MPs in this area. The 2019, 2021 and 2025 federal elections have similar results.

=== Provincial politics ===
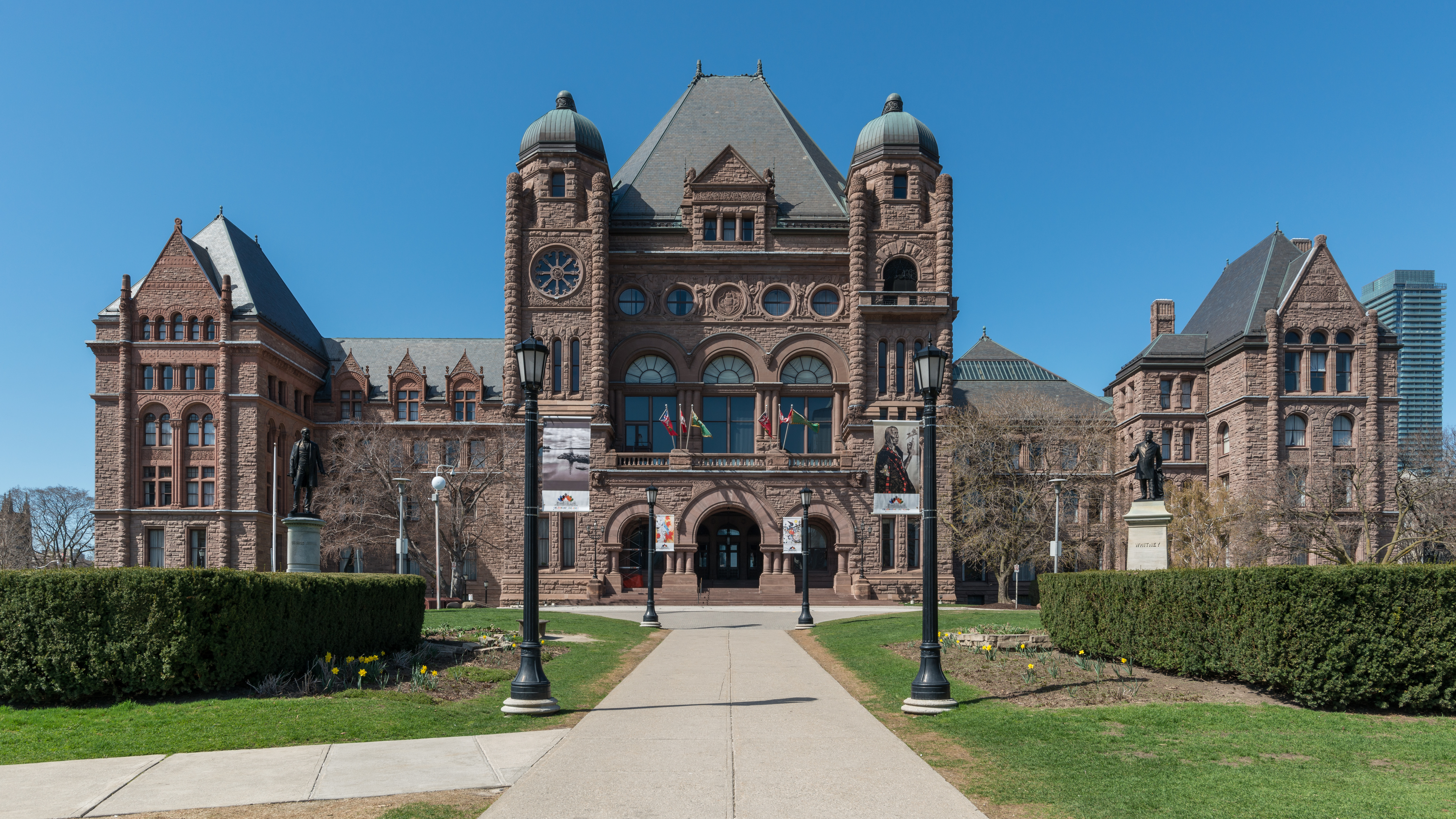
Ontario Legislative Building in Downtown Toronto

Toronto is the capital of Ontario with the Ontario Legislative Building, often metonymically known as Queen's Park after the street and park surrounding it, being located in Downtown Toronto. Most of the provincial government offices are also located in downtown Toronto.

On the provincial level of government, the Ontario Progressive Conservatives (PCs), Ontario Liberals, and the Ontario New Democrats all hold electoral districts in the GTA. While the GTA provided a strong base of support for the Progressive Conservative government between 1995 and 2003, the Ontario Liberal Party achieved a major victory in the GTA during the 2003 election and has enjoyed strong support from the region ever since. In the 2011 election, the Liberals won 33 of the 44 available seats in the GTA, allowing Premier Dalton McGuinty to hold onto a minority government. The 2014 election under McGuinty's successor, Kathleen Wynne, was an even bigger electoral landslide for the Liberals, as they won 38 seats in the region. They even took several ridings in territory that had voted PC for decades, like Durham, Burlington, Newmarket-Aurora and Halton. The PCs hold no seats in Peel Region and only one seat in each of the Halton, York, and Durham regions. While the NDP has been weak in the GTA since the 1995 election, it has seen some successes in Brampton and Durham Region, where they hold one seat each.

The Progressive Conservative Party of Ontario did not win a riding in the City of Toronto during a general election from 1999 to 2018. On the other end of the spectrum, the NDP saw major losses in Toronto during the 2014 election and held only two seats in the city. That is no longer the case since the 2018 provincial election, as the Progressive Conservatives and the NDP made significant gains at the expense of the Liberals; that continues to hold true in the 2022 and 2025 provincial elections.

=== Municipal politics ===
In 2011, 244 politicians govern the Greater Toronto Area below the provincial and federal levels, holding offices in cities, towns, and regional municipalities. There are no political parties at the municipal level in the Greater Toronto Area. Unusual for a large North American urban agglomeration, the GTA has very few agencies with powers that can cross boundaries. Attempts to create an interregional organization have been made, such as the province of Ontario's Office of the Greater Toronto Area (OGTA) in 1988 and the Greater Toronto Services Board (GTSB) in 1998, but they have failed by the lack of real authority in those agencies.

Consequently, there are few interregional public authorities: Metrolinx, an agency of the provincial government, manages the GTA-wide GO Transit system, while the Toronto and Region Conservation Authority manages some of the GTA's watersheds and natural areas. Notably, there is no organization with broad powers as in other Canadian cities, such as the Communauté métropolitaine de Montréal and Metro Vancouver Regional District.

== Demographics ==
=== Population ===
Greater Toronto Area (Note: Combined population of Toronto, Peel Region, York Region, Durham Region and Halton Region.) population history
Year	Pop.	±%
2001	5,081,826	—
2006	5,555,912	+9.3%
2011	6,054,196	+9.0%
2016	6,417,516	+6.0%
2021	6,712,341	+4.6%
Source: Statistics Canada

According to the latest census data from 2021 from Statistics Canada, the population of this area is 6,712,341. Population growth studies have projected the City of Toronto's population in 2031 to be 3,000,000 and the Greater Toronto Area's population to be 7,450,000, while the Ontario Ministry of Finance states it could reach 7.7 million by 2025. Statistics Canada identified in 2001 that four major urban regions in Canada exhibited a cluster pattern of concentrated population growth among which included the Greater Golden Horseshoe Census Region, which includes all of the Greater Toronto Area (which includes Oshawa), as well as other Southern Ontario cities including Hamilton, Guelph, Barrie, and the cities in Niagara Region and Waterloo Region. Combined, the Greater Golden Horseshoe has a population of 9,765,188 in 2021, containing over 20 per cent of Canada's population.

Name	Population in 2021	Land area	Density	Location
Province of Ontario	14,223,942	892,411.76 km^{2} (344,562.11 sq mi)	15.9 km^{2} (6.1 sq mi)	49°15′00″N 84°30′00″W
City of Toronto	2,794,356	631.10 km^{2} (243.67 sq mi)	4,427.8 km^{2} (1,709.6 sq mi)	43°44′30″N 79°22′24″W
Regional Municipality of Durham	696,992	2,521.11 km^{2} (973.41 sq mi)	276.5 km^{2} (106.8 sq mi)	44°04′32″N 78°56′16″W
Regional Municipality of Peel	1,451,022	1,247.45 km^{2} (481.64 sq mi)	1,163.2 km^{2} (449.1 sq mi)	43°45′10″N 79°47′33″W
Regional Municipality of York	1,173,334	1,758.27 km^{2} (678.87 sq mi)	667.3 km^{2} (257.6 sq mi)	44°00′08″N 79°28′20″W
Regional Municipality of Halton	596,637	965.71 km^{2} (372.86 sq mi)	617.8 km^{2} (238.5 sq mi)	43°30′30″N 79°53′16″W
Greater Toronto Area	6,712,341	7,123.64 km^{2} (2,750.45 sq mi)	942.4 km^{2} (363.9 sq mi)	43°38′33″N 79°23′14″W

=== Ethnicity ===
Largest panethnic group in Toronto CMA by census tract based on the 2021 census

Largest panethnic group in Toronto CMA by census tract based on the 2011 census

Largest panethnic group in Toronto CMA by census tract based on the 2001 census

Statistics Canada found in 2006, there were 31,910 Indigenous people living in the Greater Toronto Area, which represented 2.7 per cent of all Indigenous peoples in Canada and 13.2 per cent of those in Ontario. Most of them, however, are not registered with the Indian reserves within the Greater Toronto Area, the Chippewas of Georgina Island First Nation and the Mississaugas of Scugog Island First Nation.

Panethnic groups in the Greater Toronto Area (2001−2021)
Panethnic group	2021 Canadian census		2016 Canadian census		2011 Canadian census		2006 Canadian census		2001 Canadian census	
Panethnic group	Pop.	%	Pop.	%	Pop.	%	Pop.	%	Pop.	%
European (Note: Statistic includes all persons that did not make up part of a visible minority or an indigenous identity.)	2,961,545	44.55%	3,195,695	50.36%	3,288,345	54.93%	3,258,770	59.14%	3,277,970	65%
South Asian	1,224,890	18.43%	994,865	15.68%	847,435	14.16%	694,405	12.6%	481,265	9.54%
East Asian (Note: Statistic includes total responses of "Chinese", "Korean", and "Japanese" under visible minority section on census.)	789,180	11.87%	732,740	11.55%	621,570	10.38%	568,585	10.32%	474,905	9.42%
Black	521,610	7.85%	465,295	7.33%	413,155	6.9%	366,290	6.65%	319,125	6.33%
Southeast Asian (Note: Statistic includes total responses of "Filipino" and "Southeast Asian" under visible minority section on census.)	394,800	5.94%	345,865	5.45%	327,445	5.47%	246,040	4.46%	188,915	3.75%
Middle Eastern (Note: Statistic includes total responses of "West Asian" and "Arab" under visible minority section on census.)	299,910	4.51%	236,170	3.72%	176,310	2.95%	132,610	2.41%	97,790	1.94%
Latin American	161,460	2.43%	136,950	2.16%	120,695	2.02%	101,715	1.85%	77,375	1.53%
Indigenous	55,915	0.84%	56,090	0.88%	43,825	0.73%	31,910	0.58%	23,950	0.47%
Other/multiracial (Note: Statistic includes total responses of "Visible minority, n.i.e." and "Multiple visible minorities" under visible minority section on census.)	237,800	3.58%	182,075	2.87%	147,565	2.47%	110,345	2%	102,055	2.02%
Total responses	6,647,100	99.03%	6,345,725	98.88%	5,986,310	98.88%	5,510,710	99.19%	5,043,355	99.24%
Total population	6,712,341	100%	6,417,516	100%	6,054,196	100%	5,555,912	100%	5,081,826	100%
Note: Totals greater than 100% due to multiple origin responses.

Distribution of visible minority groups in the Toronto CMA in the 2021 census.
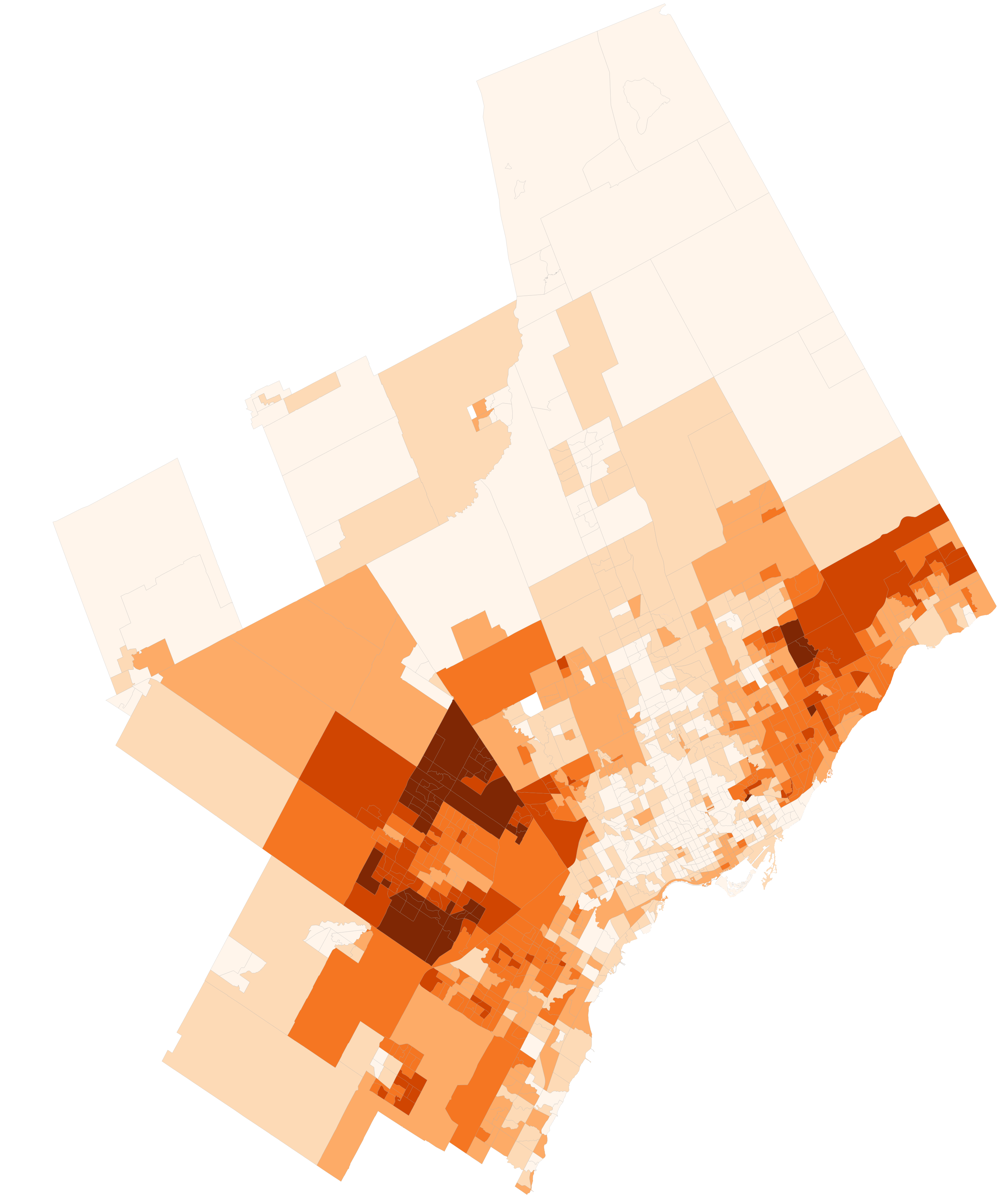
South Asians

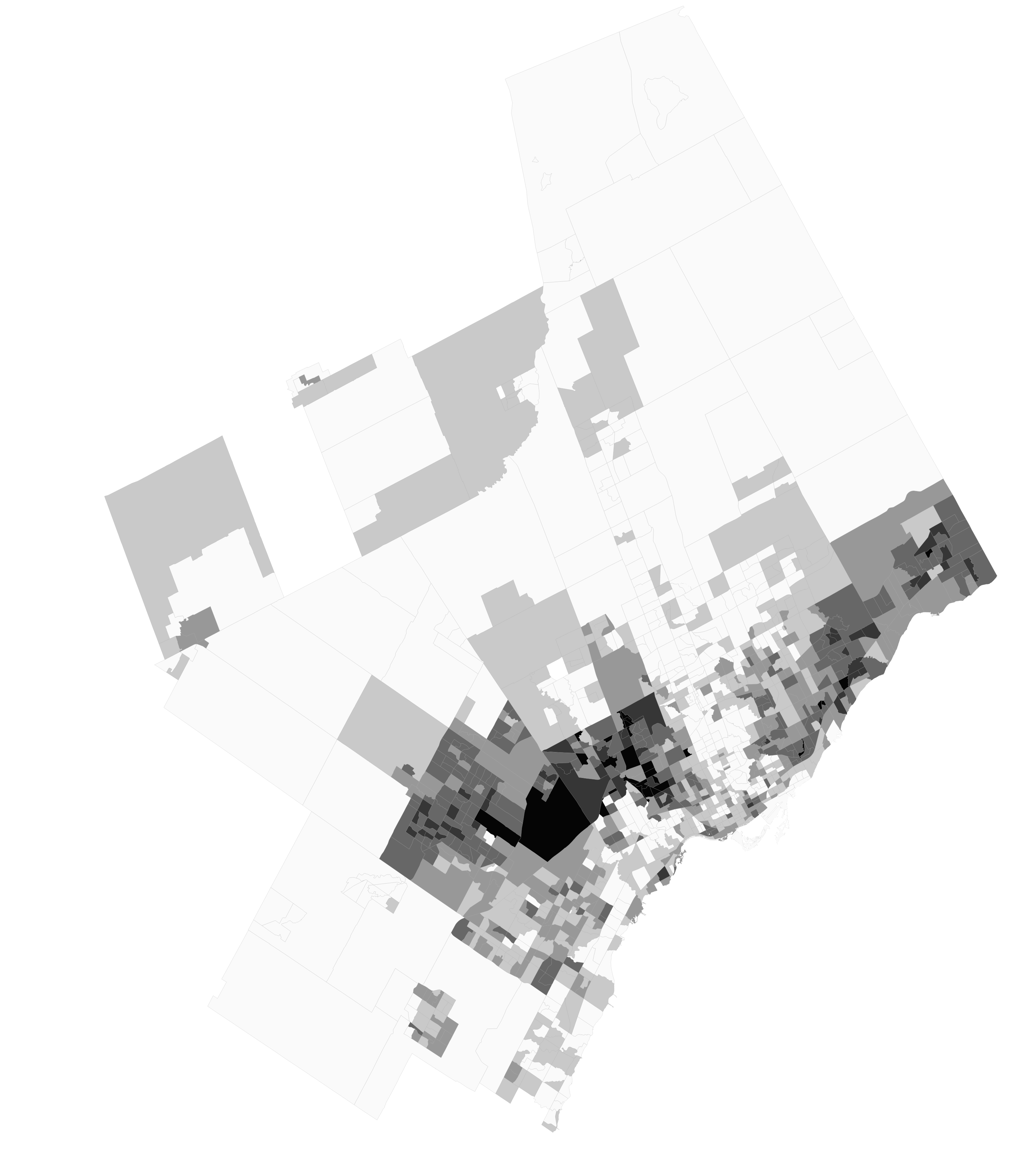
Black

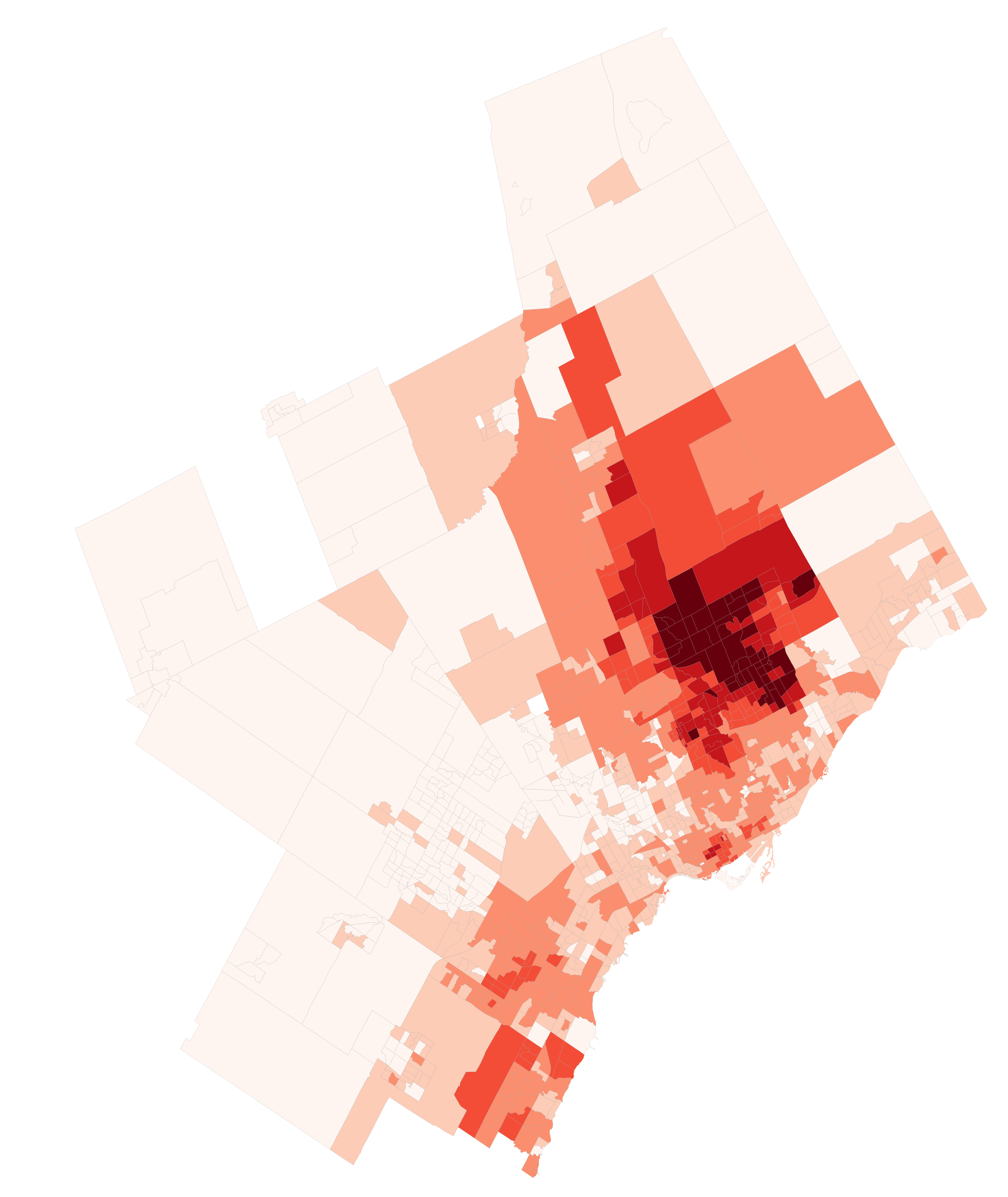
Chinese

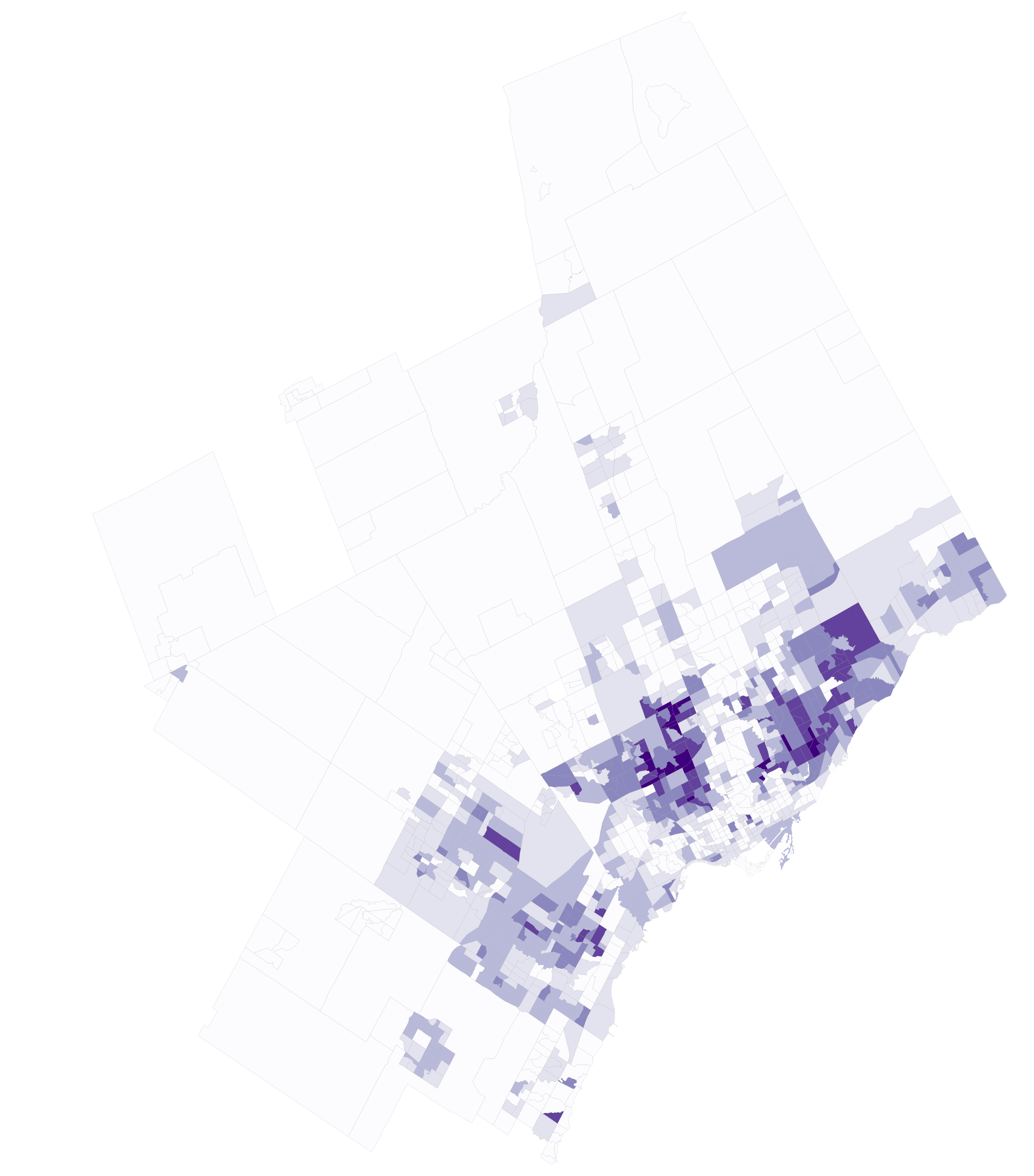
Filipinos

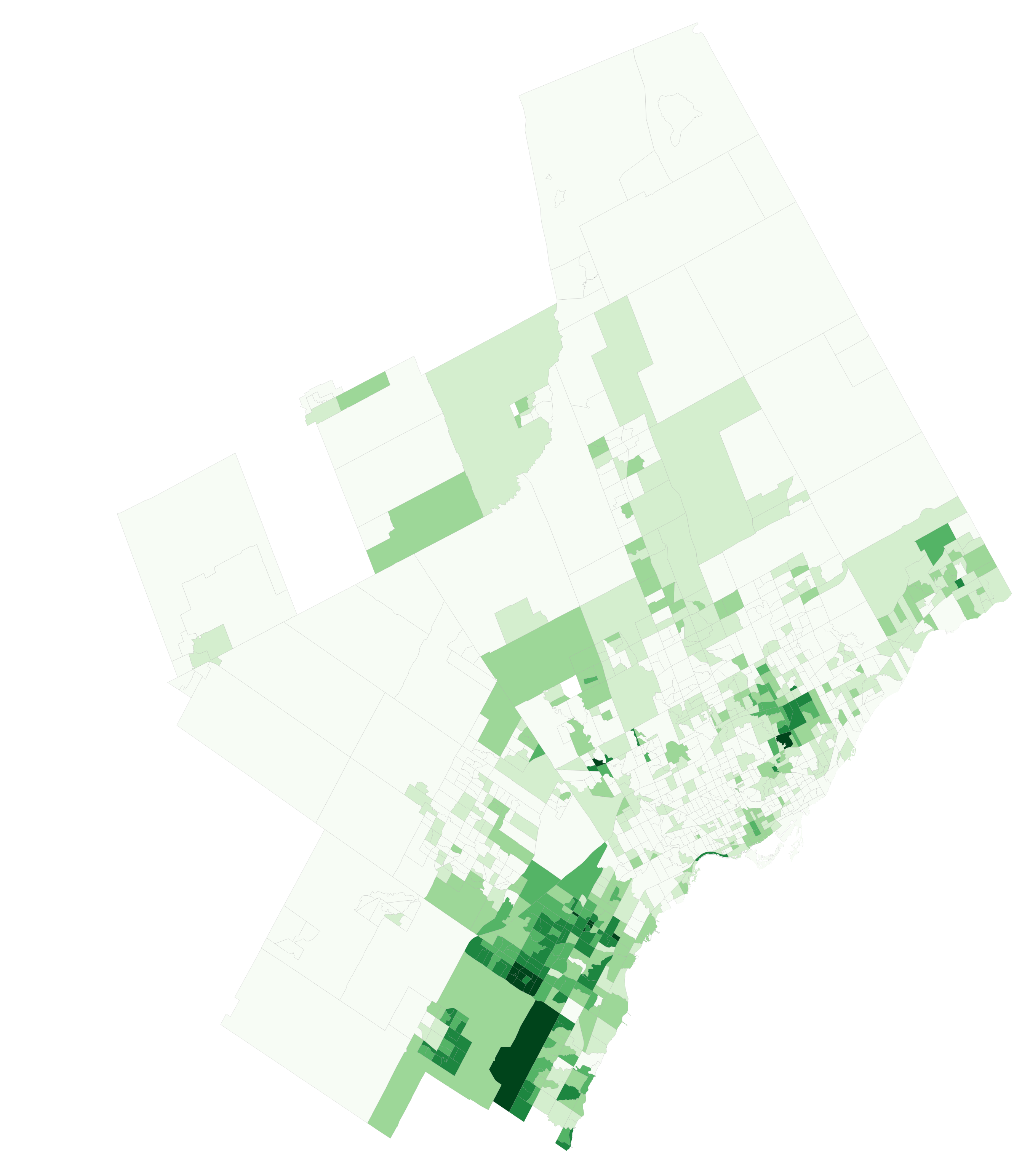
Arabs

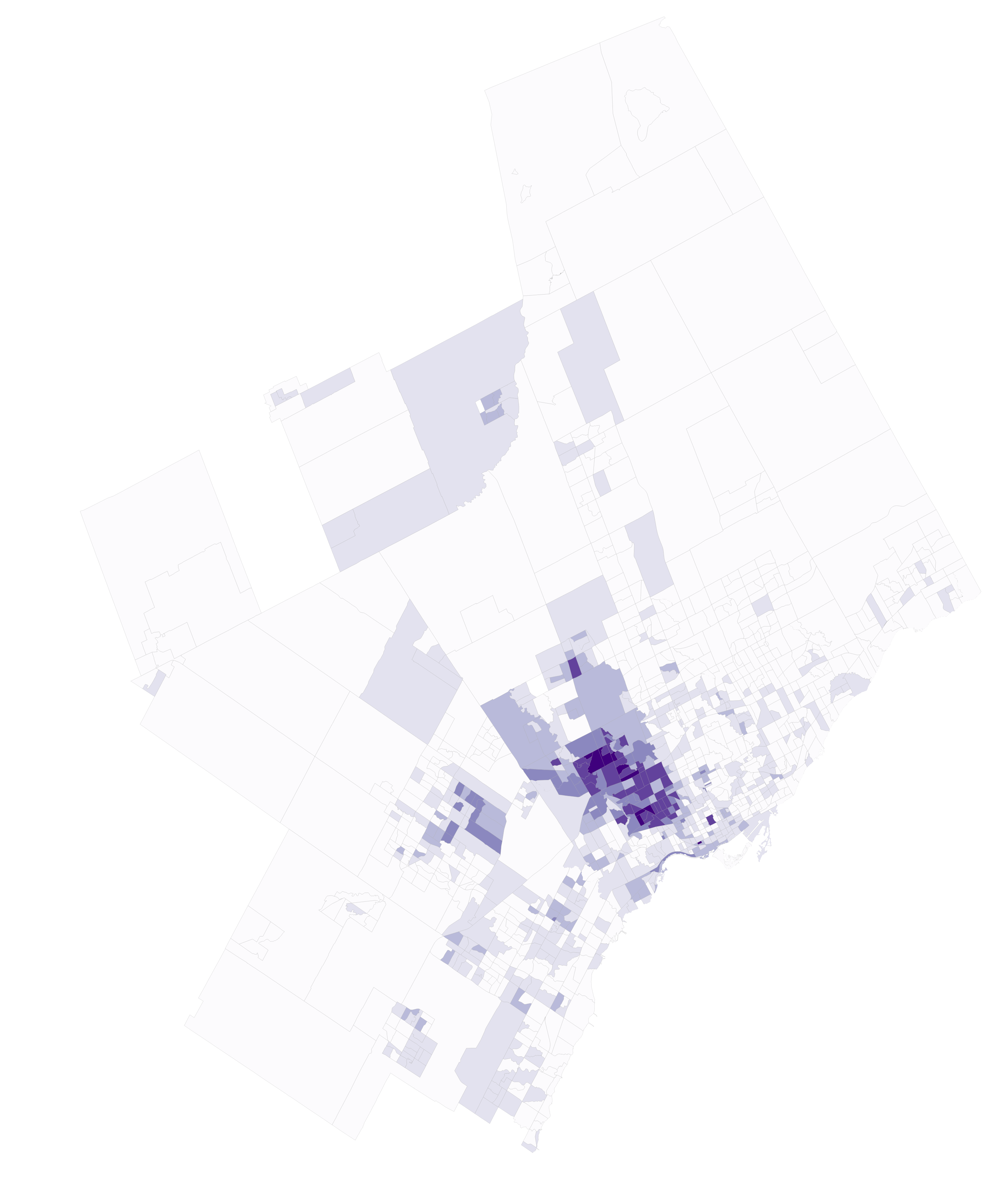
Latin Americans

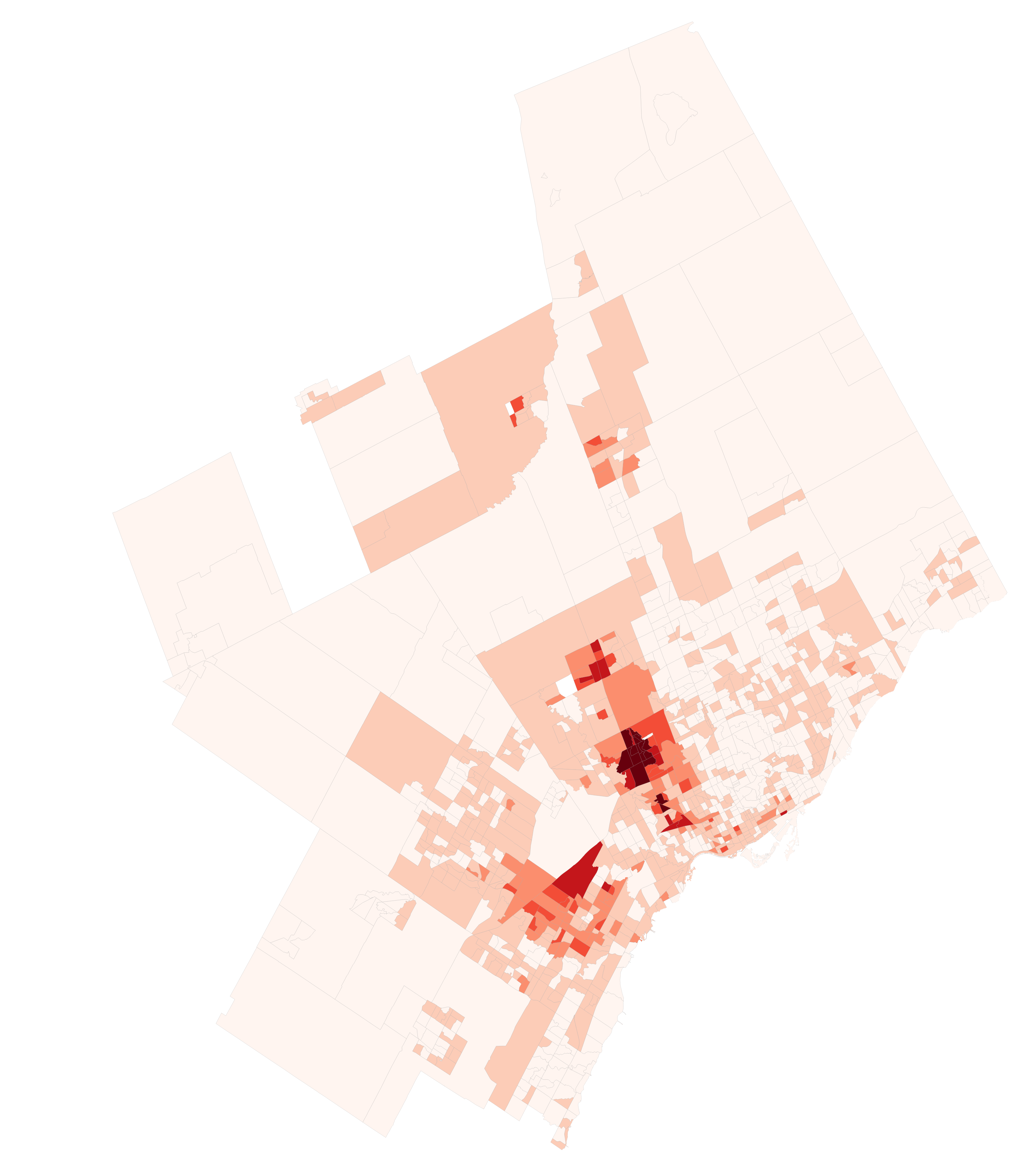
Southeast Asians (excluding Filipinos)

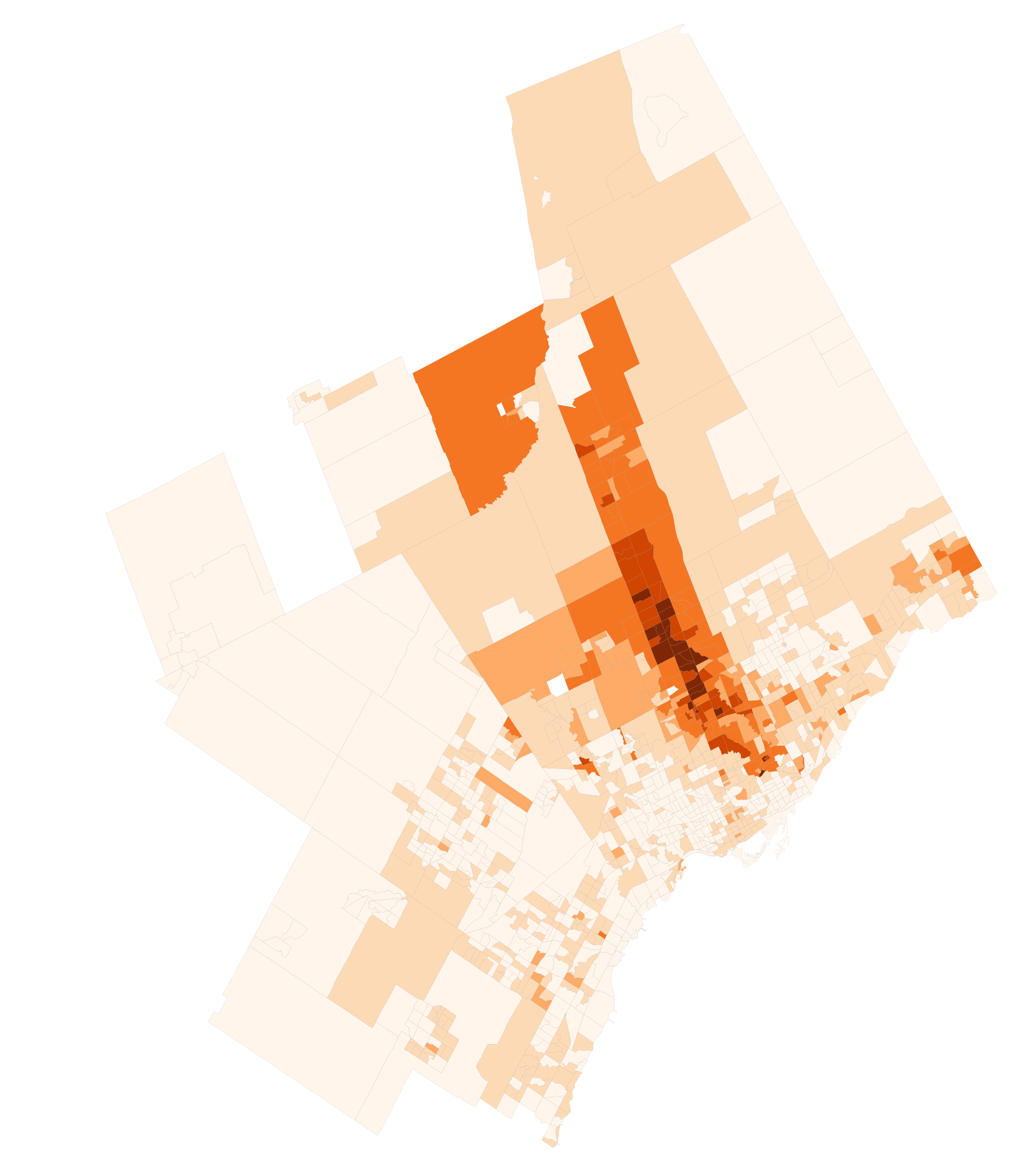
West Asians (excluding Arabs)

=== Religion ===
Religious affiliation with the most followers by census tract as of the 2021 census

Largest non-Christian religion in Toronto CMA by census tract based on the 2021 census

=== Immigration ===
In 2009, the Toronto CMA also has one of the largest proportions of foreign-born residents (46 per cent) as a share of the total population out of all metropolitan areas in the Organization for Economic Co-operation and Development (OECD). The Toronto region is also unusually diverse in the composition of its ethnicities. The four largest foreign-born populations of Toronto constitute only 15 per cent of the total foreign-born population. That is opposed to the four largest foreign-born populations of other metropolitan areas such as New York City and London, where they make up 25 per cent of their respective foreign-born populations.

== Education ==
Education in the Greater Toronto Area is managed by the provincial Ministry of Education, who manages preschool, elementary and secondary education, while the provincial Ministry of Colleges and Universities administers laws relating to tertiary education, including colleges, universities, and vocational schools.

=== Primary and secondary education ===
There are presently twelve public English first language school boards, and two French first language school boards operating within the GTA. Seven of these school boards operate secular schools, whereas the other seven operate separate schools; the seven separate school boards in the Greater Toronto Area all serve the Roman Catholic faith. In addition to public schools, there are also many private schools that operate within Greater Toronto.

Three of these GTA-based public school boards also manage institutions outside Greater Toronto, the two French first language school boards, based in Toronto, as well as the Dufferin-Peel Catholic District School Board (DPCDSB). Conversely, English first language public schools in Clarington, a municipality within Durham Region, are managed by school boards based outside the GTA.

Public school boards in the Greater Toronto Area
Region	Durham Region	Halton Region	Peel Region	City of Toronto	York Region
English secular	Durham District School Board; Kawartha Pine Ridge District School Board (Note: The school board is based outside the GTA, although it operates schools in Clarington, a municipality in Durham Region. In addition to Clarington, the school board also operates institutions in the City of Peterborough, Peterborough County, Northumberland County, and parts of Hastings County.)	Halton District School Board	Peel District School Board	Toronto District School Board	York Region District School Board
English separate	Durham Catholic District School Board; Peterborough Victoria Northumberland and Clarington Catholic District School Board	Halton Catholic District School Board	Dufferin-Peel Catholic District School Board (Note: In addition to Peel Region, the school board oversees schools in Dufferin County.)	Toronto Catholic District School Board	York Catholic District School Board
French secular	Conseil scolaire Viamonde				
French separate	Conseil scolaire catholique MonAvenir				

=== Post-secondary education ===
==== Colleges ====
The Greater Toronto Area is also home to six publicly funded colleges that have campuses spread in and around the metropolitan area. The six publicly funded colleges based in the Greater Toronto Area include:

- Centennial College (Toronto, Pickering)
- Durham College (Pickering, Brock, Scugog, Oshawa, Uxbridge) (Note: In addition to the Greater Toronto Area, Durham College also operates a campus in Cobourg and Port Hope, two municipalities situated outside the Greater Toronto Area.)
- George Brown Polytechnic (Toronto)
- Humber Polytechnic (Toronto; formerly Humber College) (Note: In addition to the Greater Toronto Area, Humber Polytechnic also operates a campus in Orangeville, a municipality situated outside the Greater Toronto Area.)
- Seneca Polytechnic (King, Markham, Toronto; formerly Seneca College) (Note: In addition to the Greater Toronto Area, Seneca Polytechnic also operates a campus in Peterborough, a municipality situated outside Greater Toronto Area.)
- Sheridan College (Brampton, Mississauga, Oakville)

Another publicly funded college, Collège Boréal, also maintains a satellite campus in Toronto. However, Collège Boréal's main campus and administration is based outside the GTA, in Greater Sudbury. In addition to publicly funded colleges, there are also many private career colleges spread throughout the Greater Toronto Area.

==== Universities ====
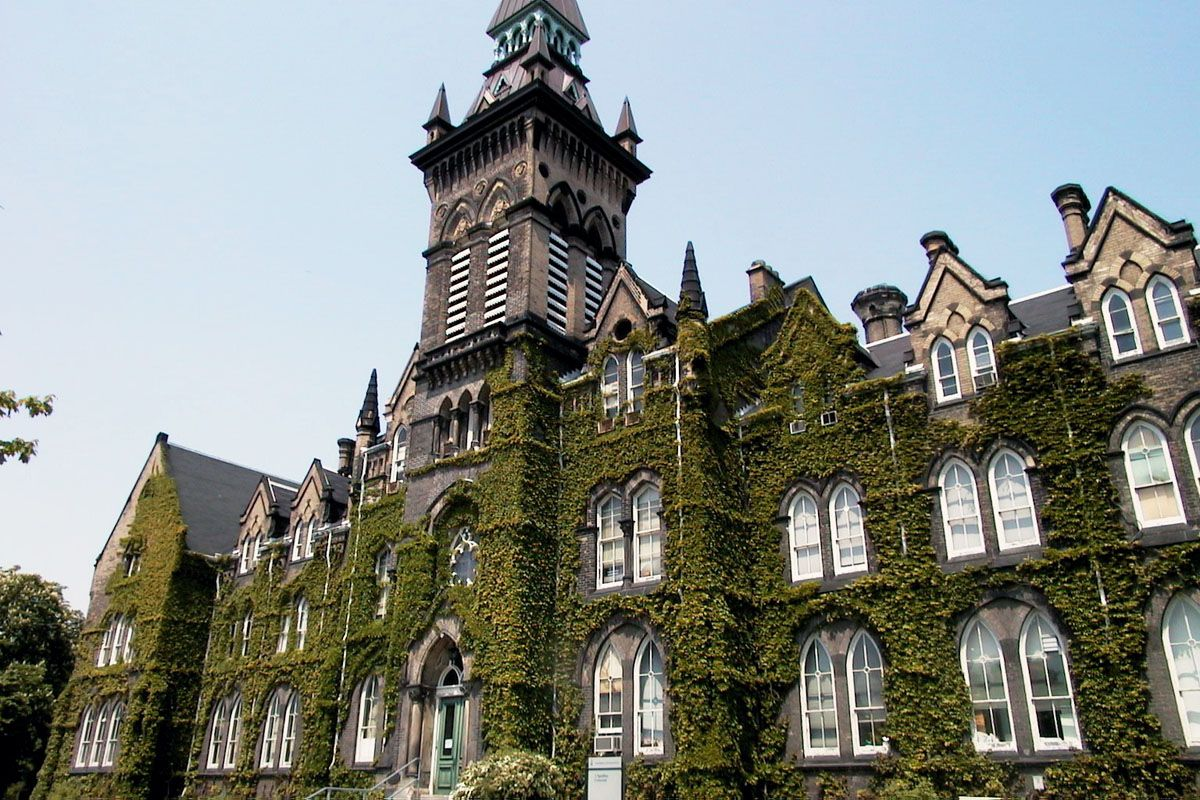
The University of Toronto, which was established in 1827, is the largest higher education institution in Canada. Building shown is 1 Spadina Crescent before renovation in the late 2010s; 1 Spadina Crescent is in the university's St. George campus.

The Greater Toronto Area is home to six publicly funded universities. Universities based within Greater Toronto include:

- OCAD University (Toronto)
- Ontario Tech University (Oshawa)
- Toronto Metropolitan University (formerly Ryerson University; Toronto, Brampton)
- Université de l'Ontario français (Toronto)
- University of Toronto (Toronto, Mississauga)
- York University (Toronto, Markham)

Three publicly funded universities based outside of the GTA operate satellite campuses within the GTA, including the Hamilton-based McMaster University, Peterborough-based Trent University, and the Guelph-based University of Guelph. McMaster's DeGroote School of Business operates the Ron Joyce Centre in Burlington; Trent University operates a satellite campus in Oshawa, referred to as Trent in Oshawa; The University of Guelph operates an affiliated institution alongside Humber College, the University of Guelph-Humber, in Toronto. One American university, Boston-based Northeastern University, operates a satellite campus in Toronto.

There also are eleven private religious universities spread throughout the GTA.

== See also ==
- Greater Toronto Hockey League
- Environmental issues in Toronto
