= List of North American cities by population =

For the majority of cities in North America (including the Caribbean), the most recent official population census results, estimates or short-term projections date to 2020, with some dating 2022 at the latest. This list compiles figures for all North American cities with a population within city limits exceeding 500,000 that year. These figures do not reflect the population of the urban agglomeration or metropolitan area, which typically does not coincide with the administrative boundaries of the city. They refer to mid-2020 populations with the following exceptions:

1. Mexican cities, whose figures derive from the 2015 Intercensal Survey conducted by INEGI with a reference date of March 15, 2020.

== List ==
Bold represents largest city in country; italic represents capital city.

Rank	City	Image	Country	Population	Year
1	**Mexico City**		Mexico	9,209,942 (Note: Population estimate is that of the federal entity known since 2020 as Ciudad de México and previously as the Distrito Federal.)	2021
2	**New York City**		United States	8,584,629	2025
3	Los Angeles		United States	3,869,089	2025
4	**Toronto**		Canada	3,273,119	2024
5	Chicago		United States	2,731,585	2025
6	Houston		United States	2,397,315	2025
7	**Havana**		Cuba	2,137,847	2022
8	Montreal		Canada	1,945,359	2024
9	Tijuana		Mexico	1,810,645 (Note: Population estimate is that of the cabecera municipal (municipal seat).)	2020 (Note: Population estimate has a reference date of 2023.)
10	Phoenix		United States	1,665,481	2025
11	Ecatepec de Morelos		Mexico	1,643,623 (Note: Population estimate is that of the entire municipio.)	2020
12	León		Mexico	1,579,803	2020
13	Philadelphia		United States	1,574,281	2025
14	Calgary		Canada	1,569,133	2024
15	San Antonio		United States	1,548,422	2025
16	Puebla		Mexico	1,542,232	2020
17	Juárez		Mexico	1,501,551	2020
18	Zapopan		Mexico	1,476,491	2020
19	San Diego		United States	1,406,106	2025
20	Guadalajara		Mexico	1,385,621	2020
21	Dallas		United States	1,329,491	2025
22	**Guatemala City**		Guatemala	1,221,739	2023
23	**Port-au-Prince**		Haiti	1,200,000	2022
24	Edmonton		Canada	1,190,458	2024
25	Ottawa		Canada	1,153,843	2024
26	Monterrey		Mexico	1,142,952	2020
27	**Tegucigalpa**		Honduras	1,132,000	2023
28	**Panama City**		Panama	1,086,990	2023
29	Nezahualcóyotl		Mexico	1,072,676	2020
30	**Managua**		Nicaragua	1,051,236	2022
31	**Santo Domingo**		Dominican Republic	1,029,110	2022
32	Fort Worth		United States	1,028,117	2025
33	Jacksonville		United States	1,017,689	2025
34	Austin		United States	1,002,632	2025
35	San Jose		United States	971,233	2022
36	Chihuahua		Mexico	925,762	2020
37	Mérida		Mexico	921,771	2020
38	Naucalpan		Mexico	911,168 (Note: The administration of Naucalpan is divided between the municipalities of Naucalpan and Huixquilucan. The population projections for each portion of the city have been combined.)	2020
39	Toluca		Mexico	910,608	2020
40	Columbus		United States	907,971	2022
41	Charlotte		United States	897,720	2022
42	Cancún		Mexico	888,797	2020
43	Indianapolis		United States	880,621 (Note: The City of Indianapolis, Indiana, and Marion County, Indiana, are separate entities with a single consolidated city-county government. The City of Indianapolis comprises all of Marion County except the other incorporated municipalities within the county. See Indianapolis (balance).)	2022
44	Saltillo		Mexico	864,431	2020
45	Aguascalientes		Mexico	863,893	2020
46	Hermosillo		Mexico	855,563	2020
47	Mexicali		Mexico	854,186	2020
48	San Luis Potosí		Mexico	845,941	2020
49	Winnipeg		Canada	843,640	2024
50	San Francisco		United States	808,437	2022
51	Culiacán		Mexico	808,416	2020
52	Querétaro		Mexico	794,789	2020
53	Brampton		Canada	791,486	2024
54	Seattle		United States	784,777	2025
55	Mississauga		Canada	780,747	2024
56	Vancouver		Canada	756,008	2024
57	Santiago de los Caballeros		Dominican Republic	744,890	2019
58	Morelia		Mexico	743,275	2020
59	Denver		United States	713,252	2022
60	Chimalhuacán		Mexico	703,215	2020
61	San Pedro Sula		Honduras	701,200	2023
62	Surrey		Canada	700,459	2024
63	Oklahoma City		United States	694,800	2022
64	Reynosa		Mexico	691,557	2020
65	Torreón		Mexico	690,193	2020
66	Nashville		United States	683,622 (Note: Nashville is a consolidated city-county. The population given is for the entire city-county, excluding other incorporated places lying within the city-county limits. See Nashville-Davidson (balance), Tennessee.)	2022
67	El Paso		United States	677,456	2022
68	Washington, D.C.		United States	671,803	2022
69	Tlalnepantla		Mexico	658,907	2020
70	Acapulco		Mexico	658,609	2020
71	Las Vegas		United States	656,274	2022
72	Boston		United States	650,706	2022
73	Tlaquepaque		Mexico	650,123	2020
74	Guadalupe		Mexico	635,862	2020
75	Portland		United States	635,067	2022
76	Hamilton		Canada	632,111	2024
77	Louisville		United States	624,444 (Note: The City of Louisville, Kentucky, and Jefferson County, Kentucky, are separate entities with a single consolidated city–county government. The City of Louisville comprises all of Jefferson County except the other incorporated municipalities within the county. See Louisville/Jefferson County metro government (balance), Kentucky.)	2022
78	Memphis		United States	621,056	2022
79	Detroit		United States	620,376	2022
80	Durango		Mexico	616,068	2020
81	**Kingston**		Jamaica	597,000	2023
82	Quebec City		Canada	592,884	2024
83	Tuxtla Gutiérrez		Mexico	578,830	2020
84	Baltimore		United States	569,931	2022
85	Tonalá		Mexico	569,913	2020
86	Milwaukee		United States	563,305	2022
87	Albuquerque		United States	561,008	2022
88	Tucson		United States	546,574	2022
89	Fresno		United States	545,567	2022
90	Veracruz		Mexico	537,963 (Note: The administration of Veracruz is divided between the municipalities of Veracruz and Boca del Río. The population estimates of the two municipalities have been combined.)	2020
91	Apodaca		Mexico	536,436	2020
92	Sacramento		United States	528,001	2022
93	Ciudad López Mateos		Mexico	523,065	2022
94	Tultitlán		Mexico	516,341	2020
95	Cuautitlán Izcalli		Mexico	515,353	2020
96	Mesa		United States	512,498	2022
97	Carrefour		Haiti	511,345	2015
98	Matamoros (Heroica Matamoros)		Mexico	510,739	2020
99	Kansas City, MO (Note: Does not include Kansas City, KS)		United States	509,297	2022
100	Santiago de Cuba		Cuba	507,167	2022

== See also ==
- List of North American metropolitan areas by population
- List of the largest urban agglomerations in North America
- List of cities in Canada
- List of cities in Mexico
- List of the largest municipalities in Canada by population
- List of United States cities by population
