= List of United States cities by area =

This list ranks the top 150 U.S. cities (incorporated places) by 2026 land area. Total areas including water are also given, but when ranked by total area, a number of coastal cities appear disproportionately larger. San Francisco is an extreme example: water makes up nearly 80% of its total area of 232 square miles (601 km^{2}).

In many cases an incorporated place is geographically large because its municipal government has merged with the government of the surrounding county. In some cases the county no longer exists, while in others the arrangement has formed a consolidated city-county (or city-borough in Alaska, or city-parish in Louisiana); these are shown in bold. Some consolidated city-counties, however, include multiple incorporated places. In such cases, this list presents only that portion (or “balance”) of such consolidated city-counties that are not a part of another incorporated place; these are indicated with asterisks (*). Cities that are not consolidated with or part of any county are independent cities, indicated with two asterisks (**).

== List ==
All data is from the United States census.

City	ST	Land area		Water area		Total area		Population (2020)
City	ST	(mi^{2})	(km^{2})	(mi^{2})	(km^{2})	(mi^{2})	(km^{2})	Population (2020)
**Sitka**	AK	2,870.3	7,434	1,904.2	4,932	4,774.5	12,366	8,458
**Juneau**	AK	2,703.0	7,001	555.0	1,437	3,258.0	8,438	32,255
**Wrangell**	AK	2,556.3	6,621	914.8	2,369	3,471.1	8,990	2,127
**Anchorage**	AK	1,706.8	4,421	237.7	616	1,944.5	5,036	291,247
**Tribune** (Note: Merged with Greeley County.)*	KS	778.2	2,016	0	0	778.2	2,016	1,182
**Jacksonville**	FL	747.3	1,935	127.1	329	874.5	2,265	949,611
**Anaconda** *	MT	736.7	1,908	4.7	12	741.4	1,920	9,421
**Butte** *	MT	715.8	1,854	0.6	1.6	716.3	1,855	34,494
Houston	TX	640.8	1,660	31.2	81	672.0	1,740	2,304,580
Oklahoma City	OK	607.0	1,572	14.3	37	621.3	1,609	681,054
Phoenix	AZ	518.5	1,343	1.0	2.6	519.5	1,345	1,608,139
San Antonio	TX	506.7	1,312	5.8	15	512.5	1,327	1,434,625
**Nashville** *	TN	475.6	1,232	21.6	56	497.2	1,288	689,447
Los Angeles	CA	470.5	1,219	31.5	82	502.0	1,300	3,898,747
**Statenville** (Note: Merged with Echols County.)	GA	420.4	1,089	0.3	0.78	420.7	1,090	3,697
Suffolk (Note: Consolidated with the independent city of Nansemond in 1974, which had been Nansemond County until 1972.)**	VA	399.2	1,034	29.7	77	428.9	1,111	94,324
Buckeye	AZ	396.1	1,026	0.2	0.52	396.3	1,026	91,502
**Indianapolis** *	IN	361.0	935	6.9	18	367.9	953	887,642
Fort Worth	TX	354.4	918	8.2	21	362.6	939	918,915
Dallas	TX	339.6	880	44.0	114	383.6	994	1,304,379
Chesapeake (Note: Consolidated with remaining unincorporated portions of Norfolk County in 1963.)**	VA	338.5	877	12.5	32	350.9	909	249,422
San Diego	CA	326.1	845	16.2	42	342.4	887	1,386,932
Austin	TX	324.8	841	6.5	17	331.3	858	961,855
**Louisville** *	KY	324.5	840	16.5	43	341.0	883	633,045
Kansas City	MO	314.5	815	4.1	11	318.6	825	508,090
Charlotte	NC	313.0	811	2.0	5.2	315.0	816	874,579
**Augusta** *	GA	302.3	783	4.1	11	306.5	794	202,081
New York City	NY	300.5	778	171.9	445	472.4	1,224	8,804,190
Memphis	TN	289.8	751	8.9	23	298.7	774	633,104
**Lexington**	KY	283.9	735	1.7	4.4	285.6	740	322,570
El Paso	TX	258.9	671	0.5	1.3	259.4	672	678,815
**Macon**	GA	249.4	646	5.5	14	254.9	660	157,346
**Cusseta**	GA	248.7	644	2.4	6.2	251.2	651	9,565
Virginia Beach (Note: Consolidated with Princess Anne County in 1963.)**	VA	244.7	634	252.8	655	497.5	1,289	459,470
Tucson	AZ	242.9	629	0.3	0.78	243.2	630	542,629
Huntsville	AL	230.1	596	1.5	3.9	231.6	600	215,006
Chicago	IL	227.7	590	6.8	18	234.5	607	2,746,388
Columbus	OH	222.9	577	6.7	17	229.5	594	905,748
**Columbus**	GA	216.5	561	4.5	12	221.0	572	206,922
Boulder City	NV	212.3	550	0.0	0	212.3	550	14,885
Valdez	AK	211.7	548	60.3	156	271.9	704	3,985
**Preston** (Note: Merged with Webster County.)	GA	209.7	543	0.9	2.3	210.6	545	2,348
California City	CA	203.6	527	0.1	0.26	203.7	528	14,973
Colorado Springs	CO	202.2	524	0.4	1.0	202.6	525	478,961
Tulsa	OK	197.3	511	4.2	11	201.5	522	413,066
Goodyear	AZ	191.3	495	0.0	0	191.3	495	95,294
Albuquerque	NM	187.4	485	1.5	3.9	189.0	490	564,559
Scottsdale	AZ	184.0	477	0.4	1.0	184.4	478	241,361
Hibbing	MN	182.0	471	4.4	11	186.5	483	16,214
Norman	OK	178.7	463	10.5	27	189.2	490	128,026
San Jose	CA	177.9	461	3.1	8.0	181.1	469	1,013,240
Peoria	AZ	177.4	459	3.2	8.3	180.6	468	190,985
**New Orleans**	LA	169.6	439	180.3	467	349.8	906	383,997
Corpus Christi	TX	167.7	434	324.3	840	492.0	1,274	317,863
Wichita	KS	166.3	431	4.5	12	170.8	442	397,532
Aurora	CO	164.6	426	0.6	1.6	165.2	428	386,261
Montgomery	AL	162.3	420	2.4	6.2	164.8	427	200,603
Raleigh	NC	153.3	397	1.1	2.8	154.4	400	467,665
**Denver**	CO	153.1	397	1.7	4.4	154.7	401	715,522
Sierra Vista	AZ	152.4	395	0.3	0.78	152.7	395	45,308
**Georgetown**	GA	151.2	392	9.3	24	160.6	416	2,235
Mobile	AL	150.8	391	40.6	105	191.5	496	187,041
Bakersfield	CA	150.4	390	1.5	3.9	151.9	393	403,455
Fayetteville	NC	149.3	387	1.8	4.7	151.1	391	208,501
Birmingham	AL	147.0	381	2.5	6.5	149.5	387	200,733
Omaha	NE	145.2	376	3.6	9.3	148.8	385	486,051
Carson City (Note: Consolidated with Ormsby County in 1969.)**	NV	144.5	374	12.6	33	157.1	407	58,639
Lubbock	TX	143.2	371	1.3	3.4	144.5	374	257,141
Chattanooga	TN	142.4	369	7.7	20	150.1	389	181,099
Mesa	AZ	142.1	368	0.6	1.6	142.7	370	504,258
Las Vegas	NV	141.9	368	0.1	0.26	141.9	368	641,903
Columbia	SC	139.8	362	2.9	7.5	142.7	370	136,632
Detroit	MI	138.7	359	4.2	11	142.9	370	639,111
Bunnell	FL	136.3	353	0.1	0.26	136.3	353	3,276
Greensboro	NC	135.7	351	5.2	13	140.9	365	299,035
Atlanta	GA	135.3	350	1.1	2.8	136.4	353	498,715
**Philadelphia**	PA	134.3	348	8.1	21	142.4	369	1,603,797
Winston-Salem	NC	133.9	347	1.2	3.1	135.1	350	249,545
Portland	OR	133.5	346	11.5	30	145.0	376	652,503
Orlando	FL	129.6	336	8.4	22	138.0	357	307,573
**Lynchburg**	TN	129.2	335	1.2	3.1	130.4	338	6,461
Kansas City	KS	124.7	323	3.6	9.3	128.3	332	156,607
Fernley	NV	123.2	319	6.7	17	129.9	336	22,895
Little Rock	AR	123.0	319	3.0	7.8	125.9	326	202,591
Brownsville	TX	122.1	316	6.4	17	128.5	333	186,738
Marana	AZ	121.7	315	0.7	1.8	122.4	317	51,908
Yuma	AZ	121.1	314	0.1	0.26	121.2	314	95,548
Henderson	NV	121.1	314	0.5	1.3	121.6	315	317,610
Durham	NC	120.3	312	0.8	2.1	121.1	314	283,506
Port St. Lucie	FL	119.2	309	1.6	4.1	120.8	313	204,851
Casa Grande	AZ	117.2	304	0.0	0	117.2	304	53,658
**Athens** *	GA	116.4	301	1.8	4.7	118.2	306	127,315
Fresno	CA	116.2	301	1.2	3.1	117.4	304	542,107
Charleston	SC	115.5	299	20.2	52	135.7	351	150,227
Eloy	AZ	114.8	297	0.1	0.26	114.9	298	15,635
Tampa	FL	114.5	297	63.3	164	177.8	460	384,959
**Hartsville**	TN	114.3	296	2.3	6.0	116.6	302	11,615
Fort Wayne	IN	111.8	290	0.3	0.78	112.1	290	263,886
Jackson	MS	111.7	289	2.1	5.4	113.8	295	153,701
Salt Lake City	UT	110.9	287	0.4	1.0	111.3	288	199,723
Surprise	AZ	110.5	286	0.2	0.52	110.7	287	143,148
Savannah	GA	109.5	284	4.8	12	114.3	296	147,780
Reno	NV	109.3	283	2.8	7.3	112.1	290	264,165
Laredo	TX	109.1	283	1.5	3.9	110.5	286	255,205
Shreveport	LA	108.2	280	15.7	41	123.8	321	187,593
Abilene	TX	106.7	276	5.4	14	112.1	290	125,182
Cape Coral	FL	106.3	275	13.3	34	119.6	310	194,016
Amarillo	TX	106.1	275	2.0	5.2	108.0	280	200,393
Palmdale	CA	106.1	275	0.2	0.52	106.3	275	169,450
Babbitt	MN	106.0	275	0.8	2.1	106.8	277	1,397
North Las Vegas	NV	105.4	273	0.0	0	105.4	273	262,527
Rio Rancho	NM	103.6	268	0.0	0	103.6	268	104,046
Lincoln	NE	102.9	267	1.4	3.6	104.2	270	291,082
Tallahassee	FL	102.6	266	2.9	7.5	105.6	274	196,169
Unalaska	AK	102.1	264	108.8	282	210.9	546	4,254
El Reno	OK	101.1	262	0.6	1.6	101.8	264	16,989
Clarksville	TN	100.1	259	0.7	1.8	100.8	261	166,722
North Port	FL	99.4	257	4.8	12	104.2	270	74,793
St. Marys	PA	99.3	257	0.2	0.52	99.5	258	12,738
Nightmute	AK	98.8	256	5.0	13	103.8	269	306
Knoxville	TN	98.8	256	5.5	14	104.3	270	190,740
Sacramento	CA	98.7	256	2.1	5.4	100.7	261	524,943
Denton	TX	97.0	251	1.4	3.6	98.4	255	139,869
Palm Coast	FL	96.4	250	1.2	3.1	97.6	253	89,258
Milwaukee	WI	96.2	249	0.6	1.6	96.8	251	577,222
Arlington	TX	95.8	248	3.6	9.3	99.4	257	394,266
Palm Springs	CA	94.5	245	0.1	0.26	94.7	245	44,575
Lancaster	CA	94.3	244	0.3	0.78	94.5	245	173,516
South Fulton	GA	92.9	241	1.3	3.4	94.2	244	107,436
Waco	TX	92.2	239	12.4	32	104.7	271	138,486
Dothan	AL	90.6	235	0.3	0.78	90.9	235	71,072
Des Moines	IA	88.2	228	2.6	6.7	90.7	235	214,133
Baton Rouge	LA	86.9	225	2.2	5.7	89.1	231	227,470
Boise	ID	86.7	225	1.0	2.6	87.7	227	235,684
Palm Bay	FL	86.7	225	1.5	3.9	88.2	228	119,760
Sioux Falls	SD	85.7	222	0.5	1.3	86.2	223	192,517
Oak Ridge	TN	85.3	221	4.7	12	90.0	233	31,402
Springfield	MO	84.5	219	0.6	1.6	85.1	220	169,176
Edmond	OK	84.4	219	3.1	8.0	87.5	227	94,428
Coolidge	AZ	84.3	218	0.2	0.52	84.5	219	13,218
Madison	WI	84.3	218	21.4	55	105.7	274	269,840
Seattle	WA	84.0	218	58.0	150	142.1	368	737,015
Beaumont	TX	82.1	213	2.8	7.3	84.9	220	115,282
Lawton	OK	81.9	212	0.0	0	81.9	212	90,381
Riverside	CA	81.1	210	0.3	0.78	81.5	211	314,998
Baltimore **	MD	80.9	210	11.1	29	92.1	239	585,708
Toledo	OH	80.5	208	3.3	8.5	83.8	217	270,871
Jonesboro	AR	80.2	208	0.6	1.6	80.7	209	78,576
Grand Prairie	TX	79.4	206	9.0	23	88.4	229	196,100
Ellsworth	ME	79.3	205	14.6	38	93.9	243	8,399

== Gallery ==
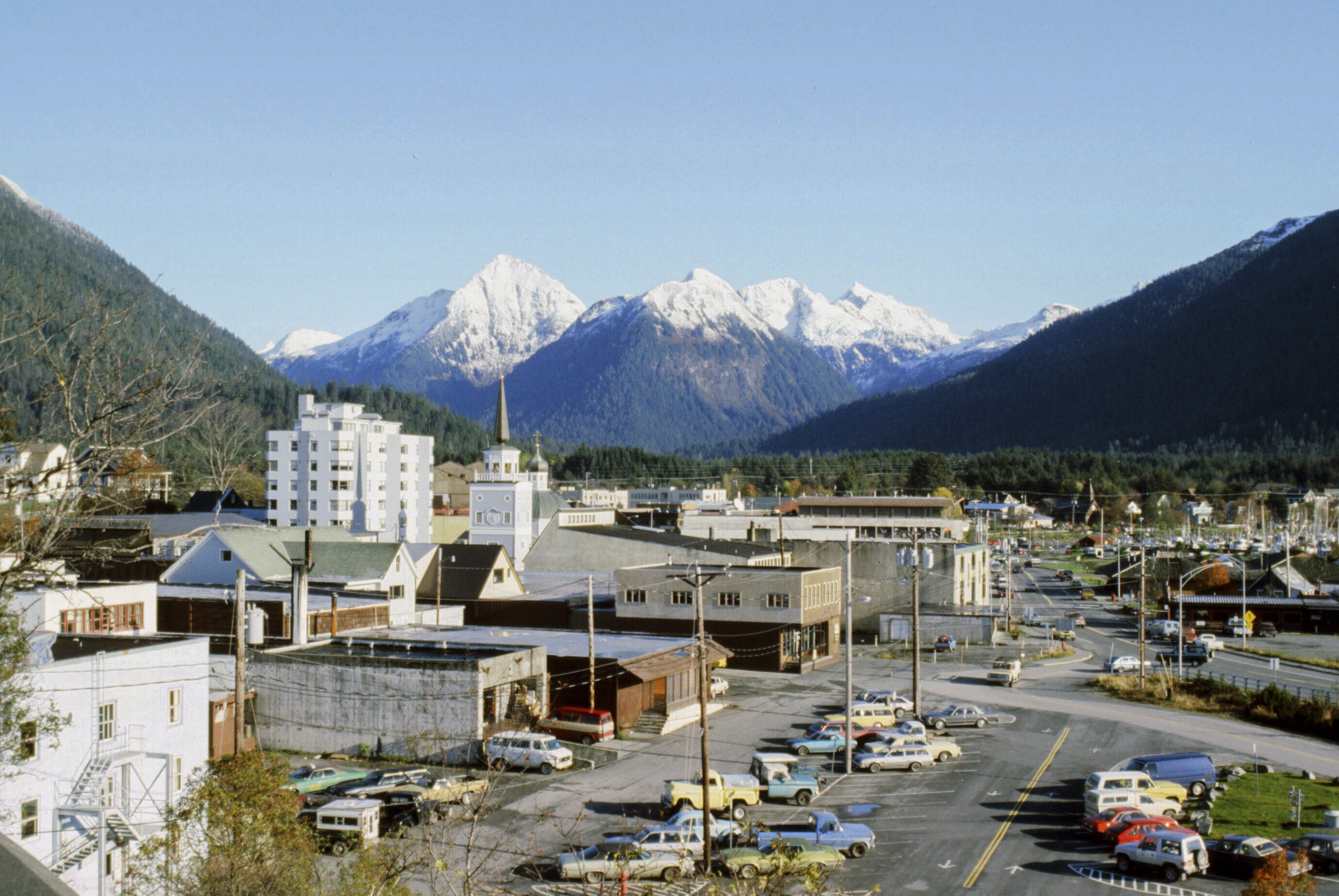
1 - Sitka, Alaska

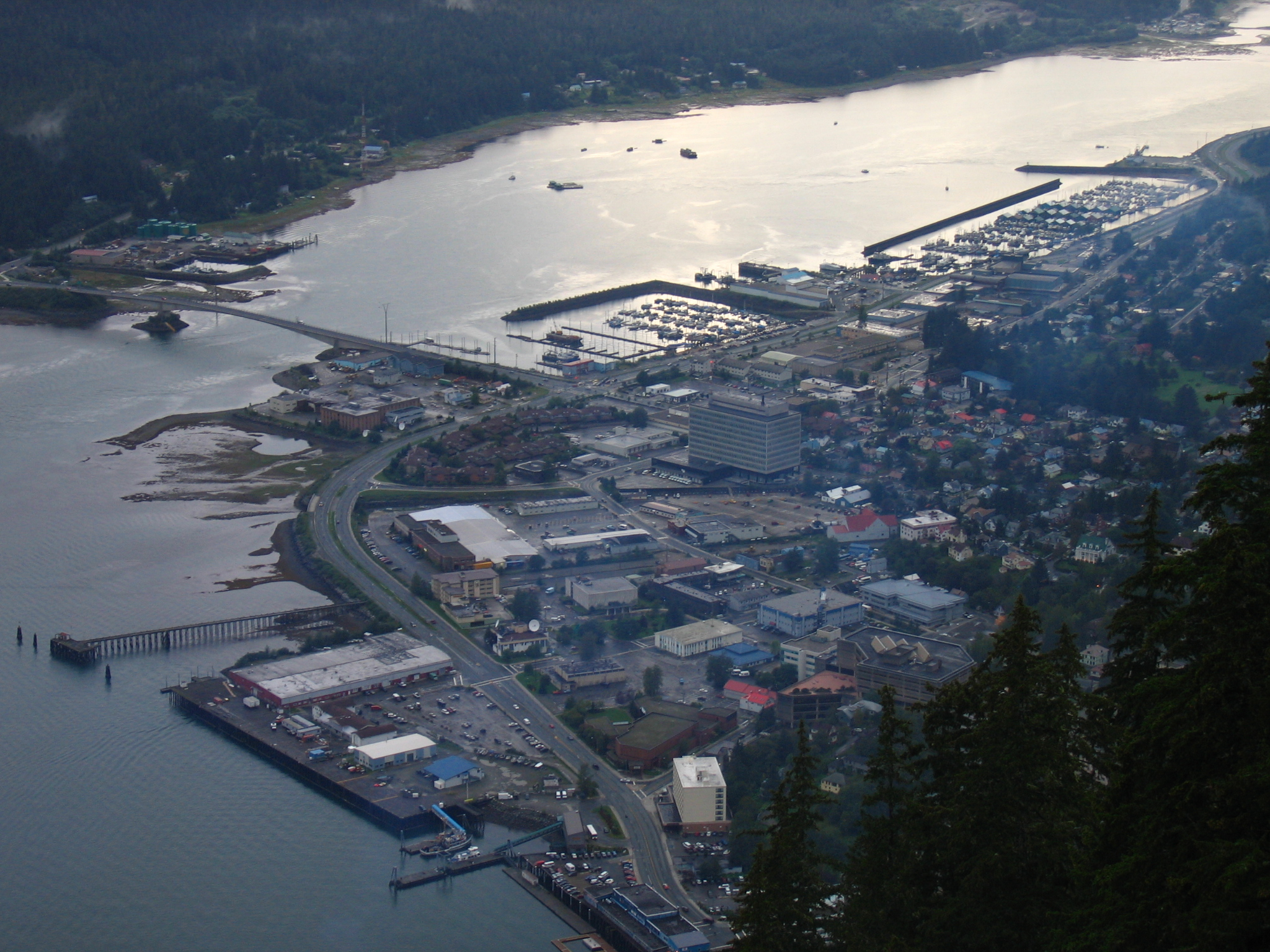
2 - Juneau, Alaska

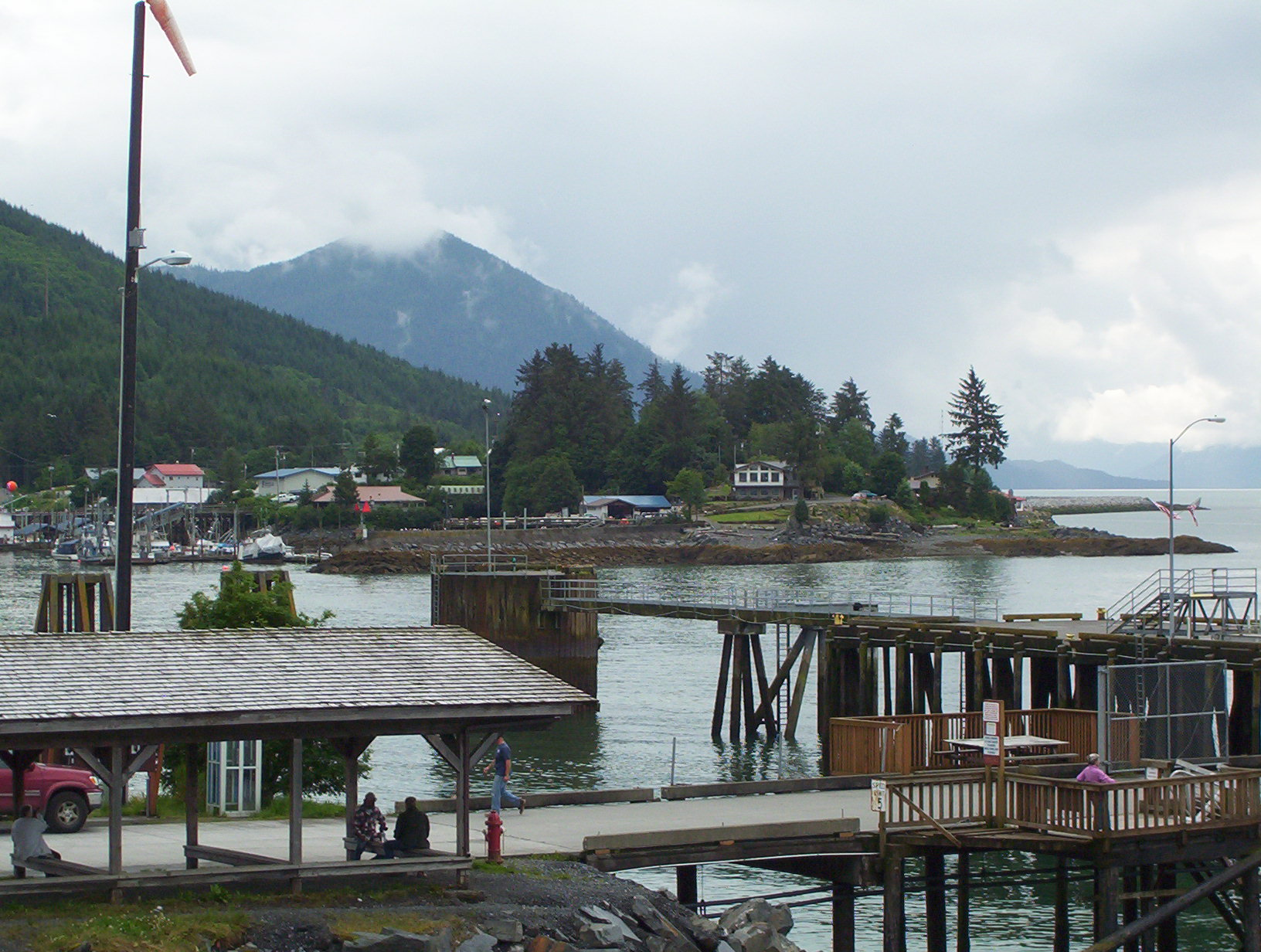
3 - Wrangell, Alaska

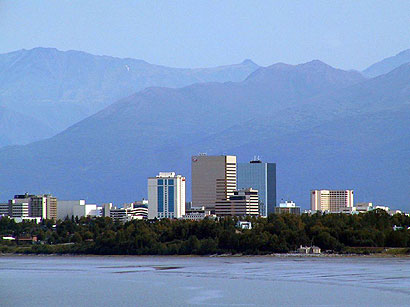
4 - Anchorage, Alaska

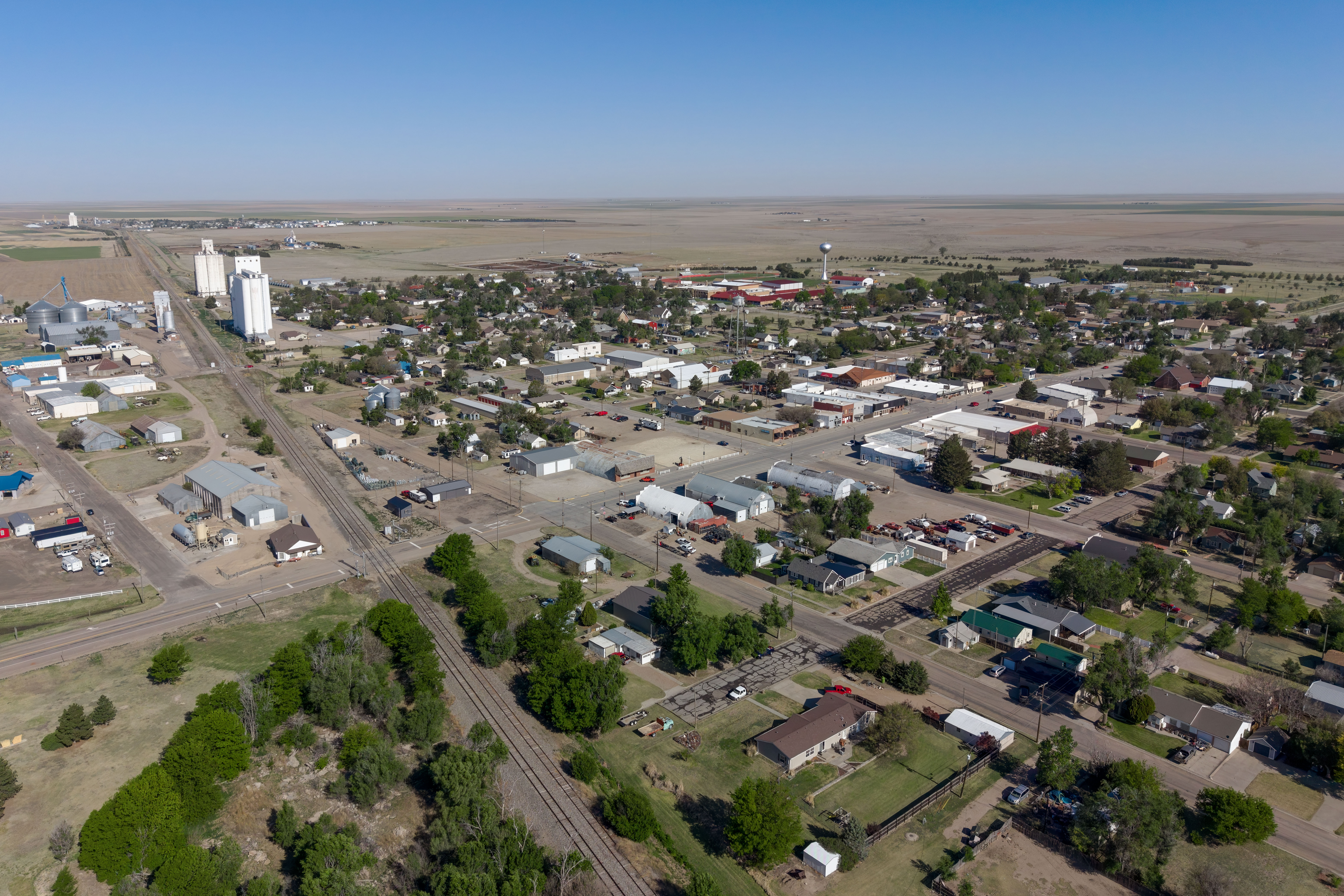
5 - Tribune, Kansas

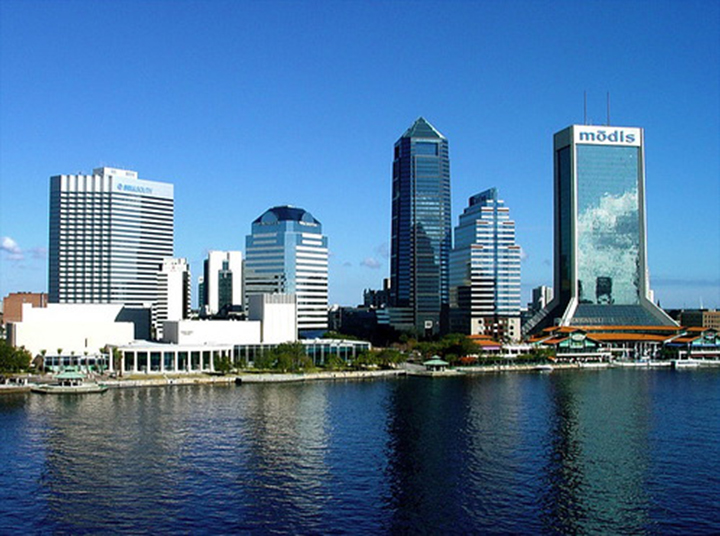
6 - Jacksonville, Florida

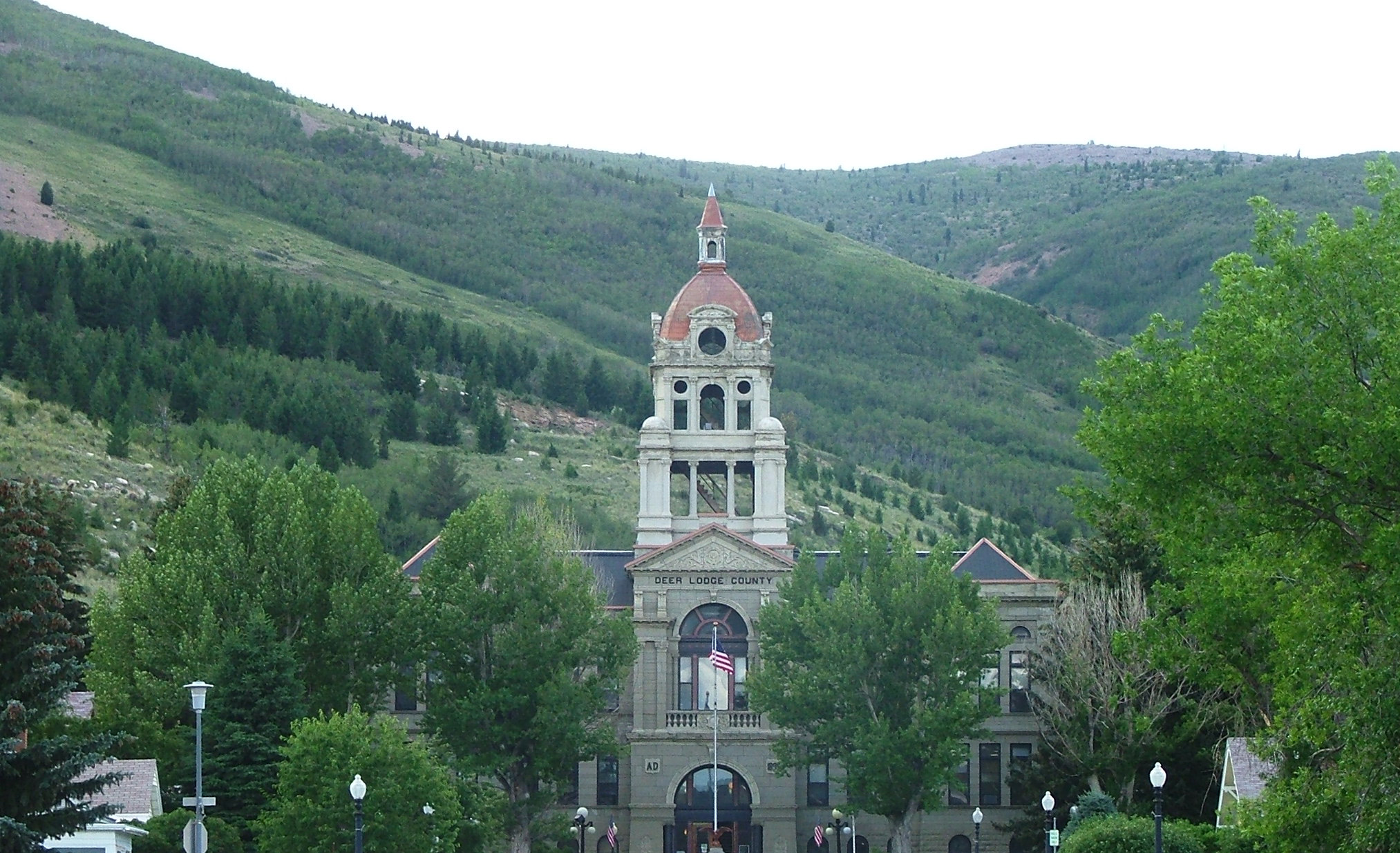
7 - Anaconda, Montana

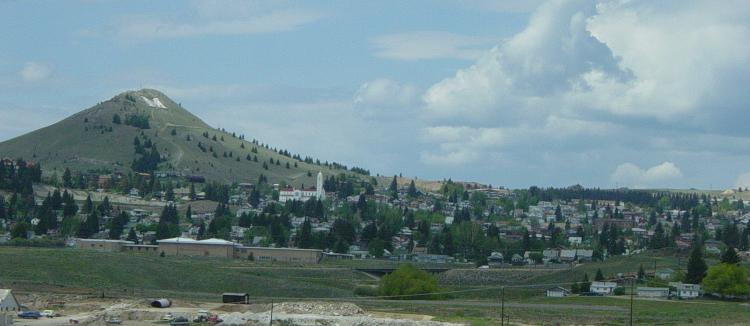
8 - Butte, Montana

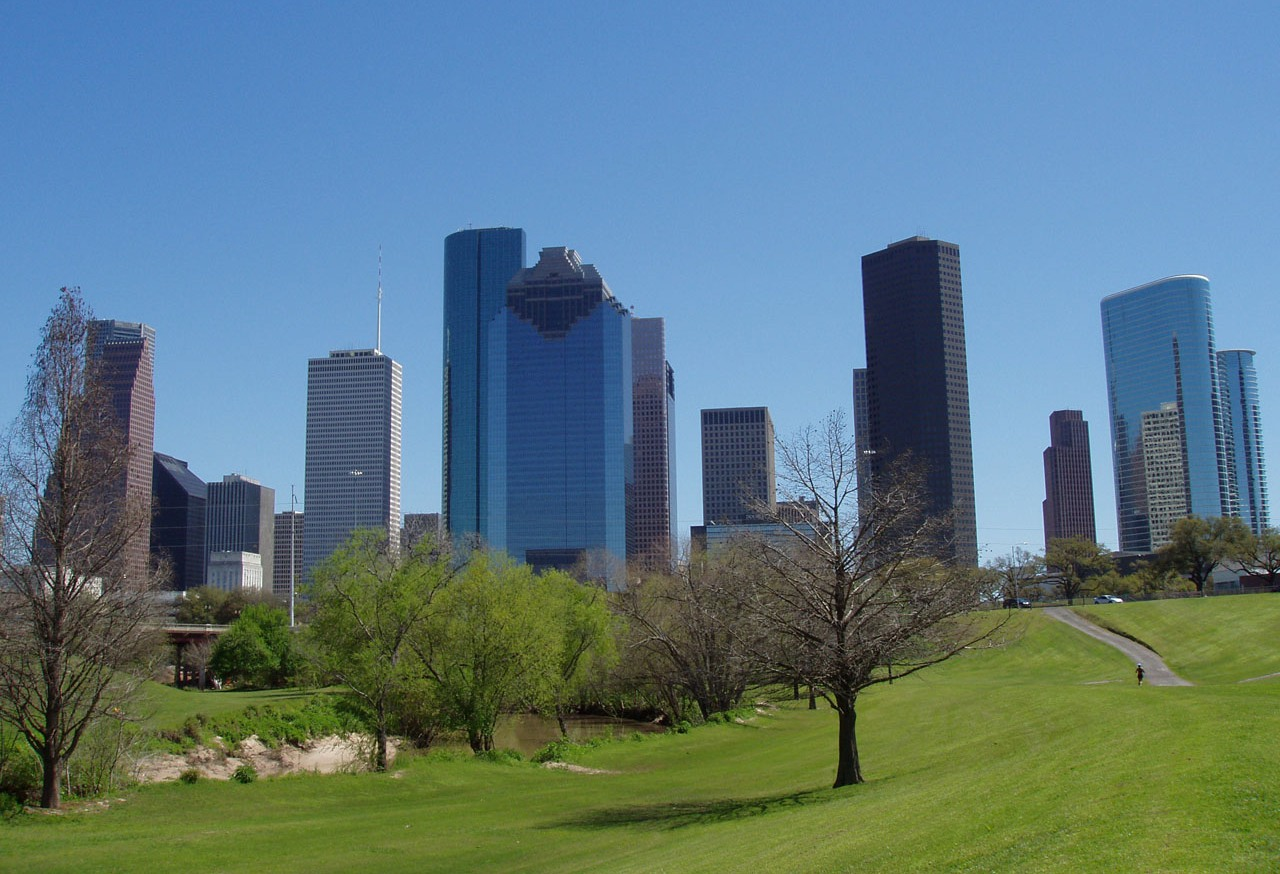
9 - Houston, Texas

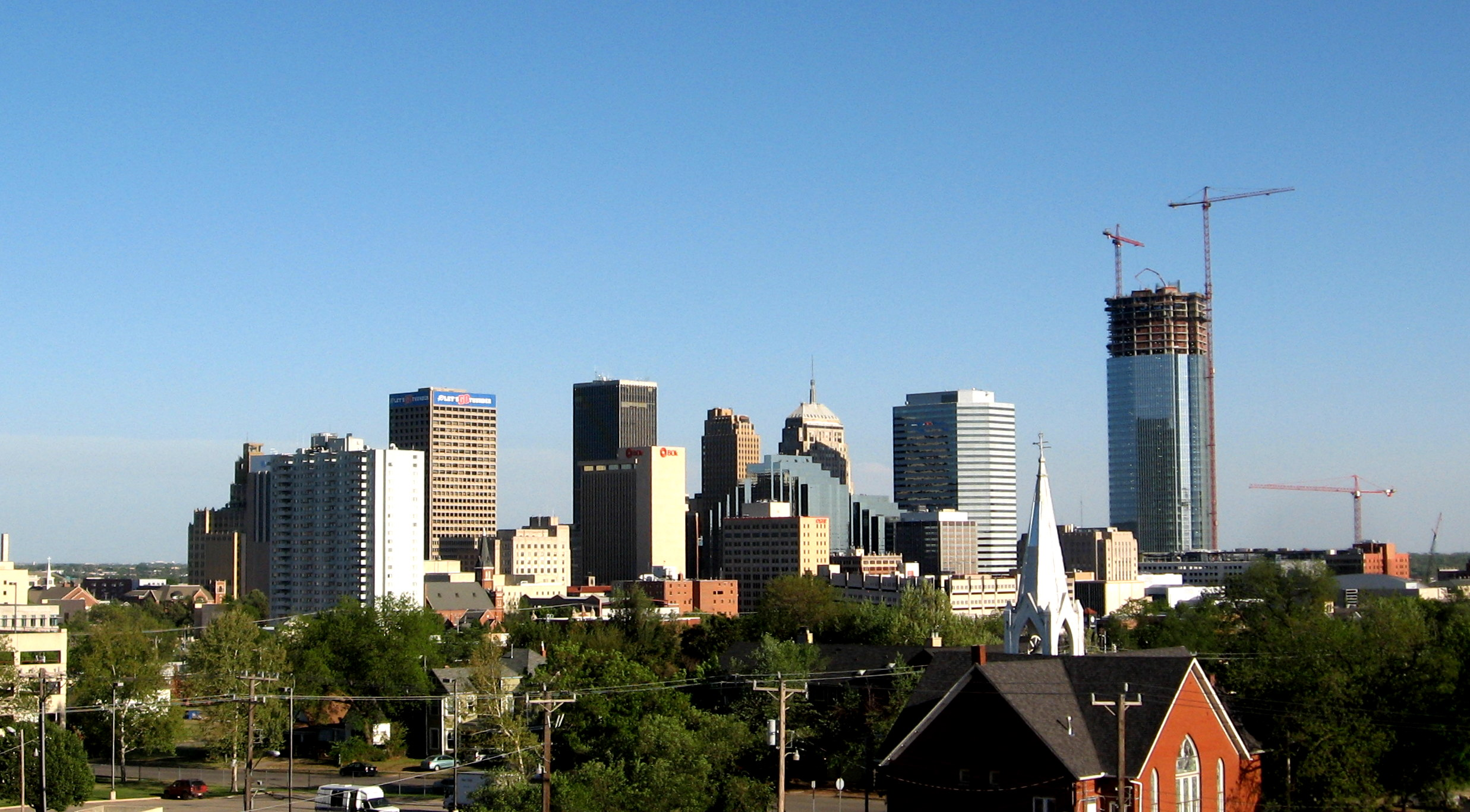
10 - Oklahoma City, Oklahoma

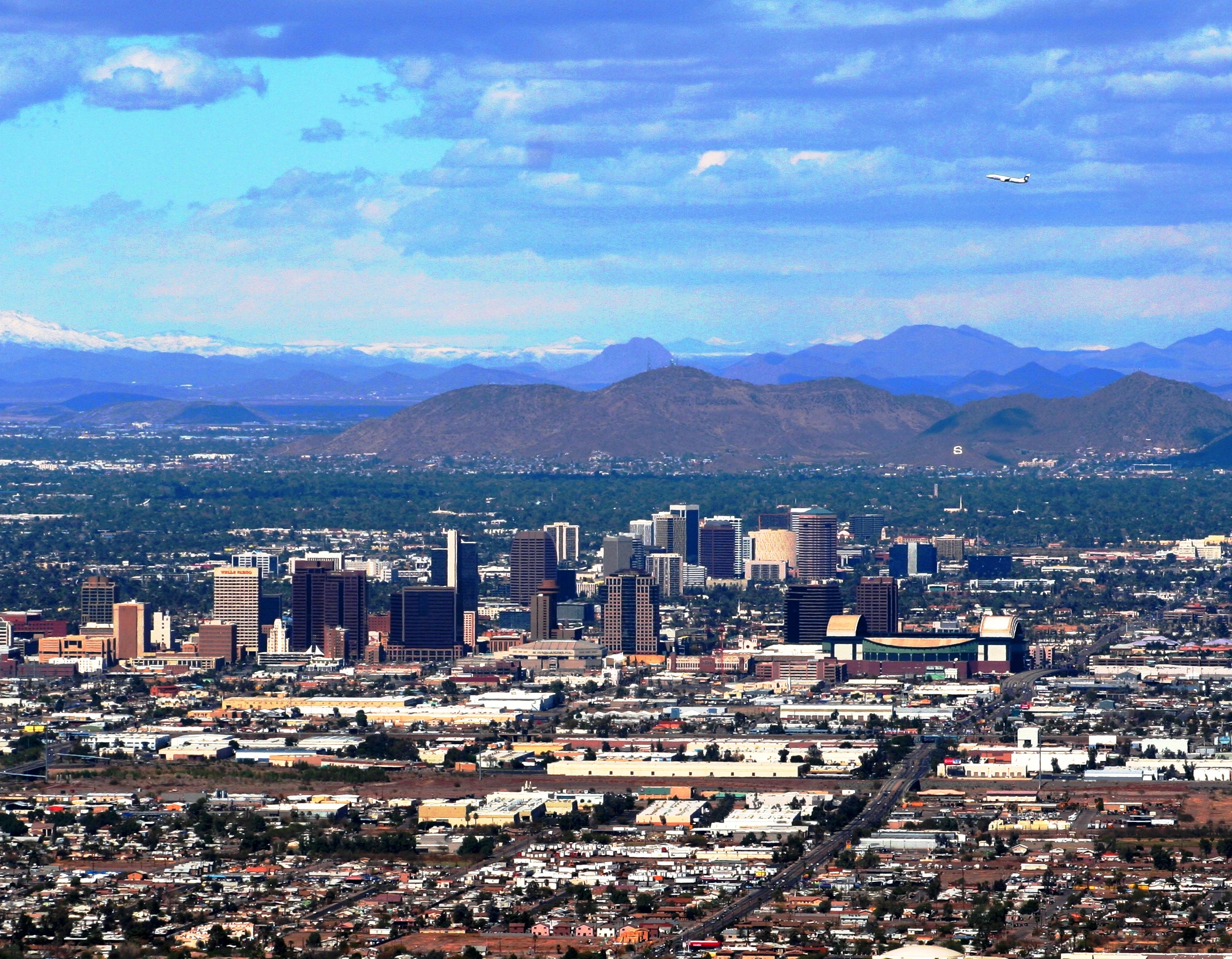
11 - Phoenix, Arizona

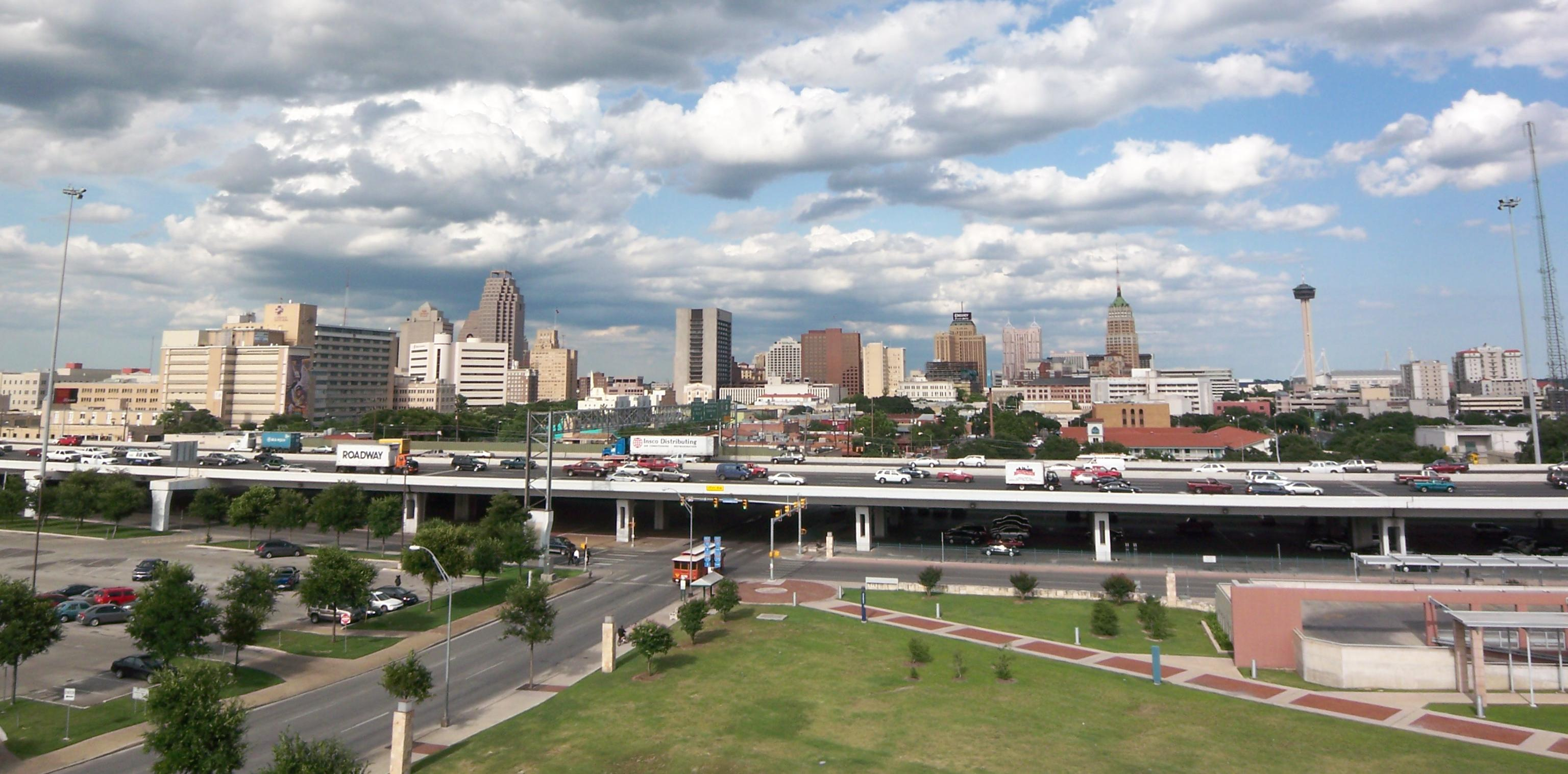
12 - San Antonio, Texas

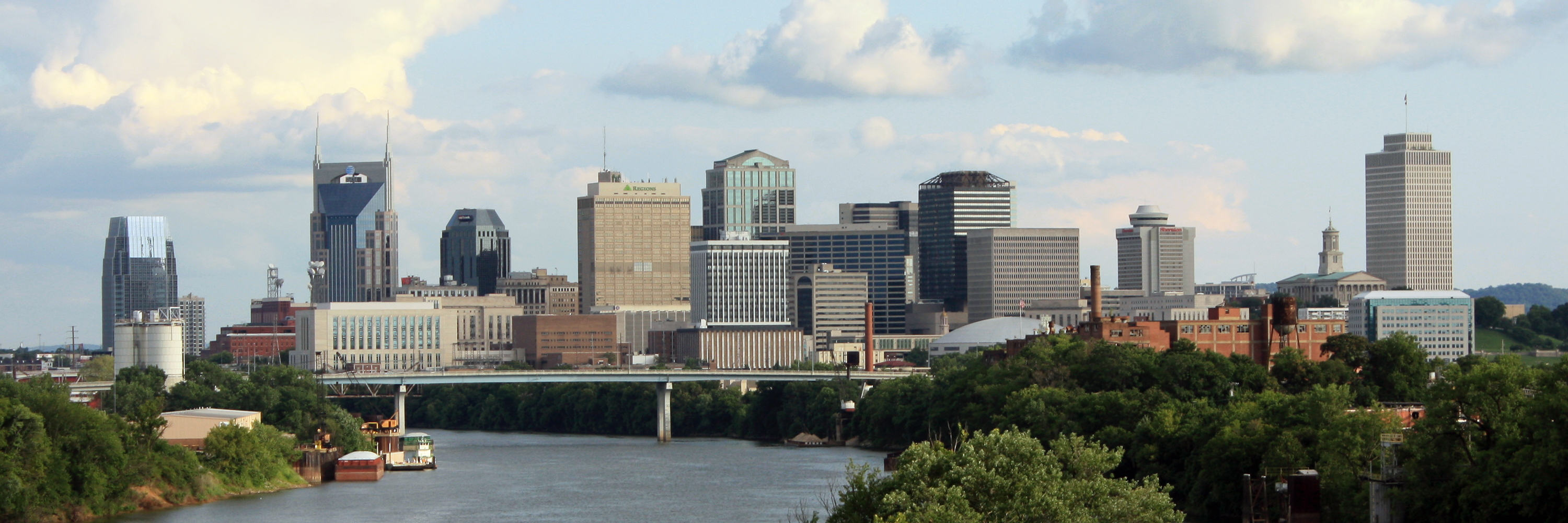
13 - Nashville, Tennessee

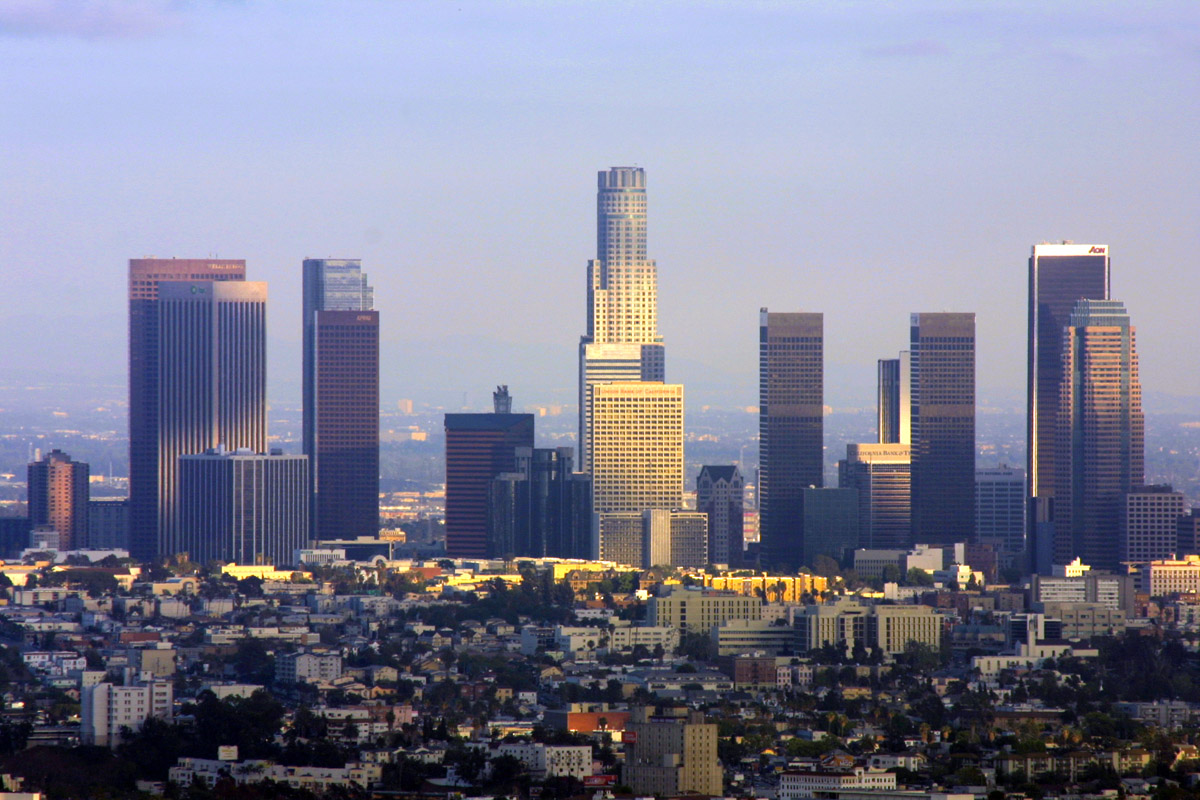
14 - Los Angeles, California

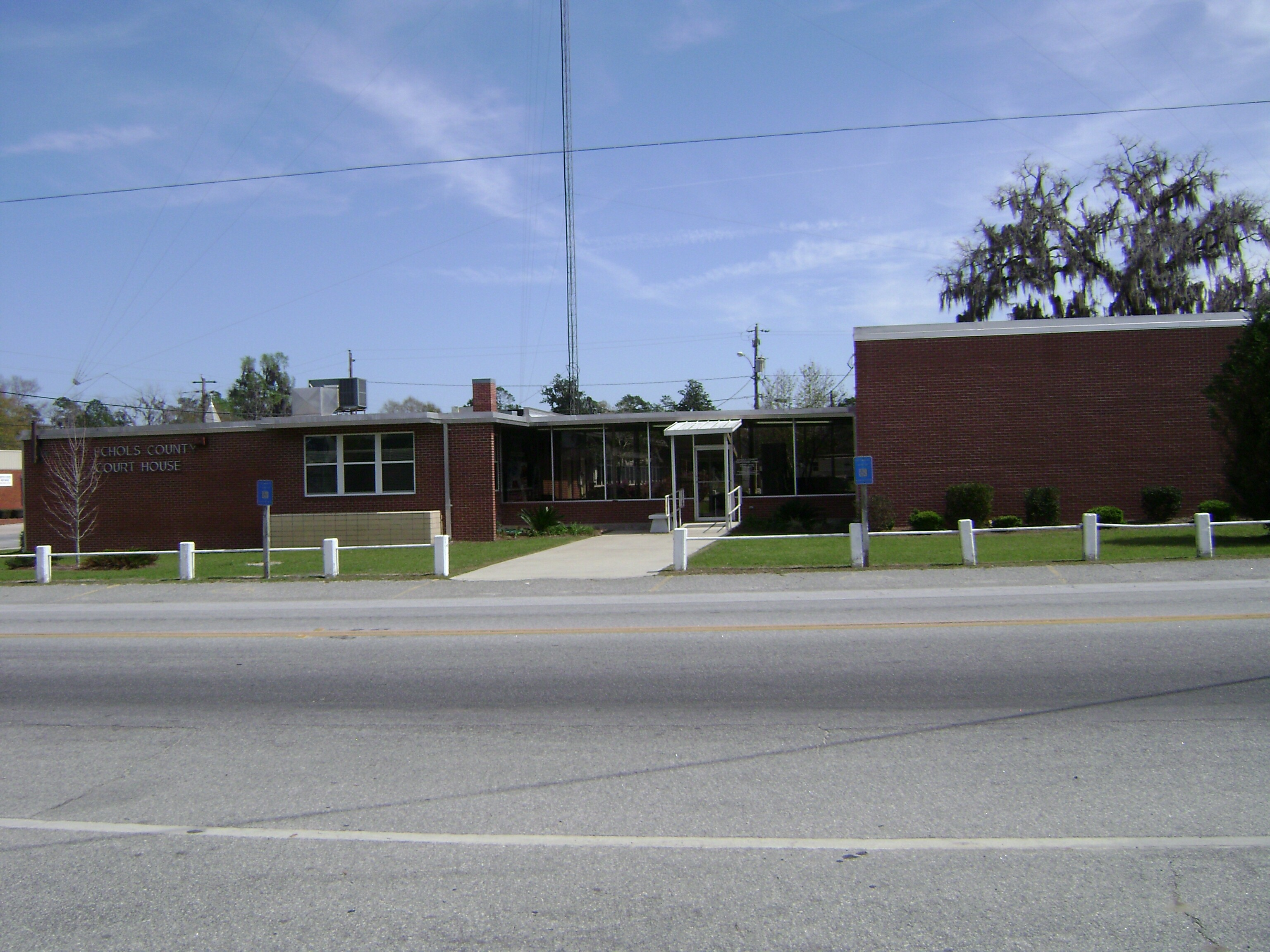
15 - Statenville, Georgia

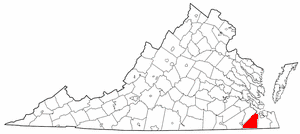
16 - Suffolk, Virginia

17 - Buckeye, Arizona

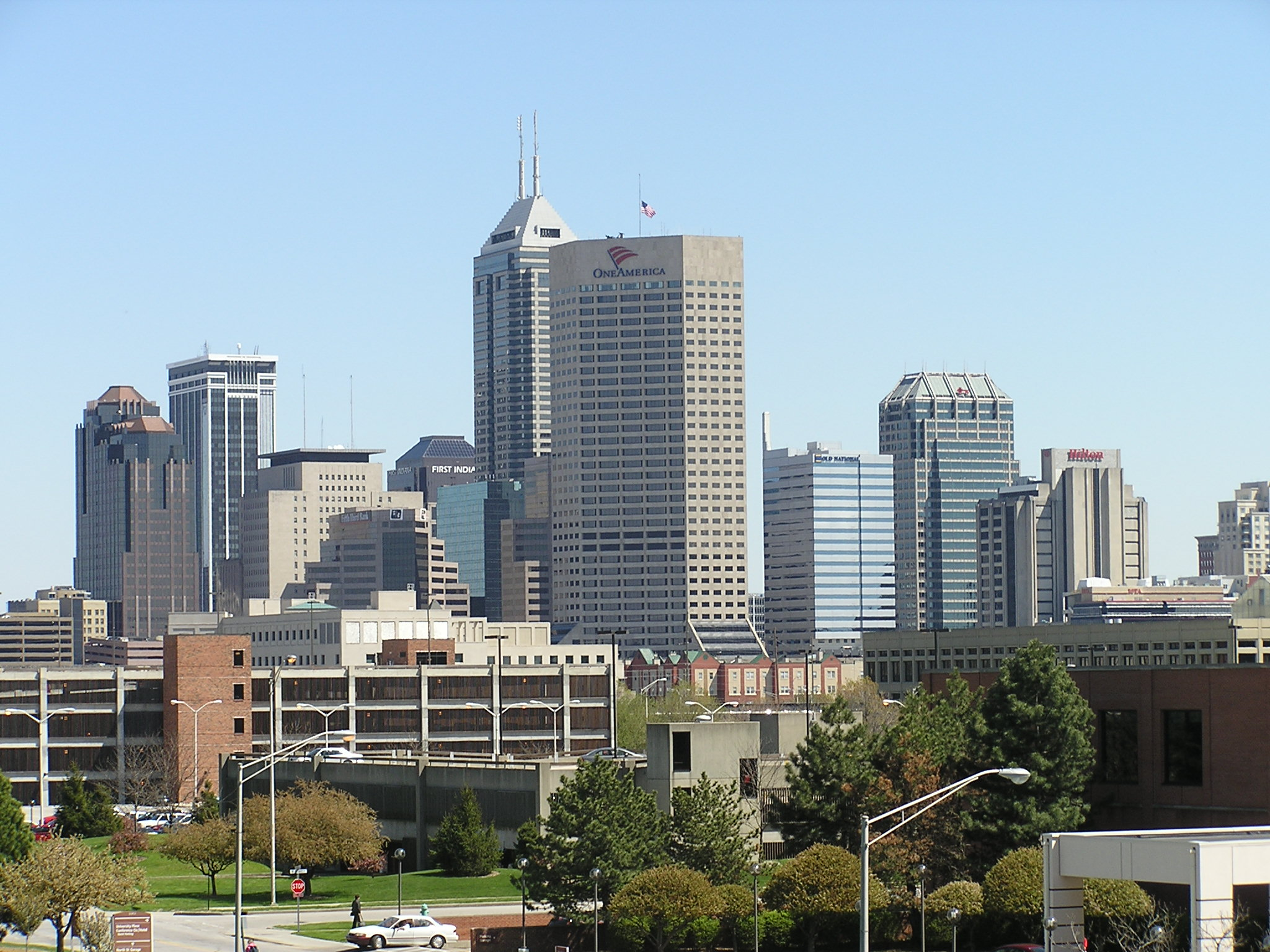
18 - Indianapolis, Indiana

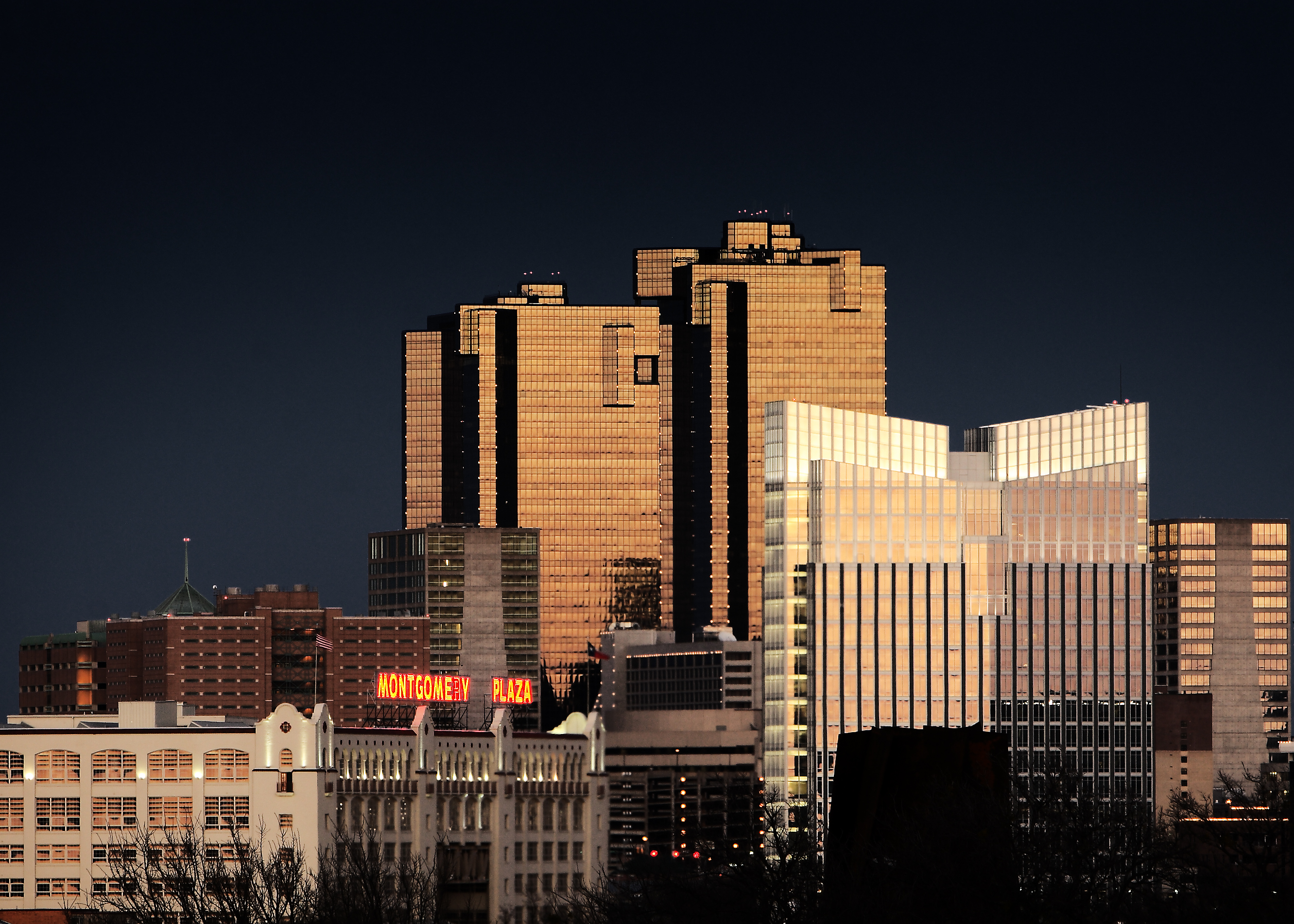
19 - Fort Worth, Texas

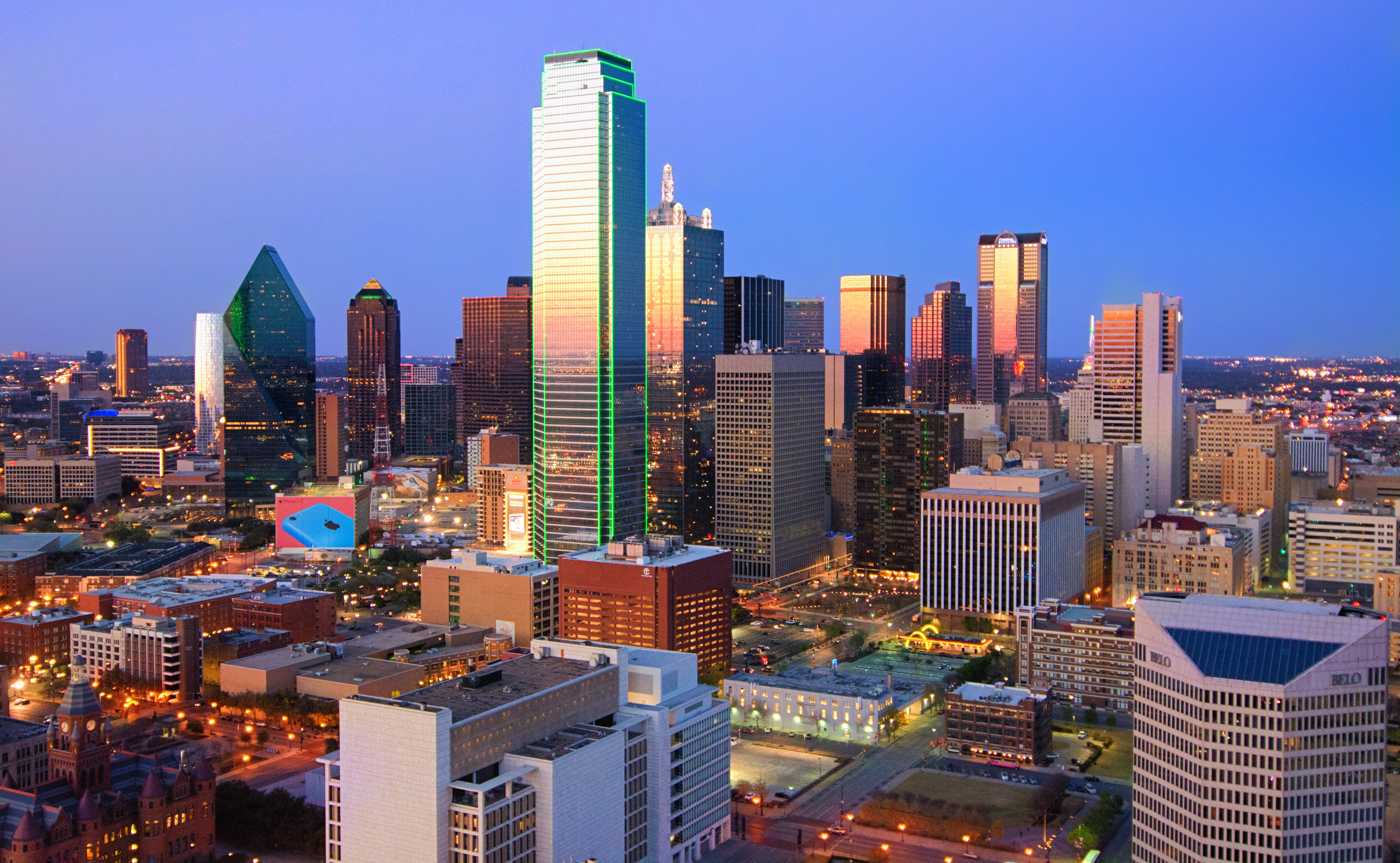
20 - Dallas, Texas

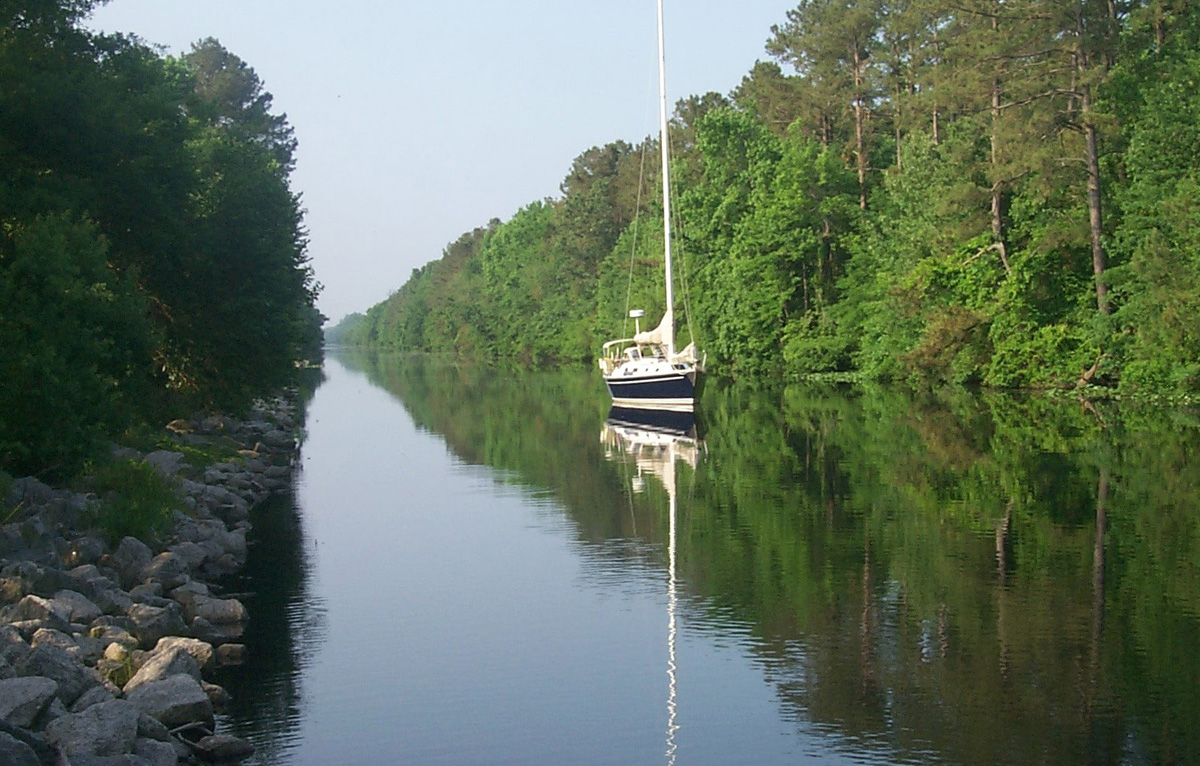
21 - Chesapeake, Virginia

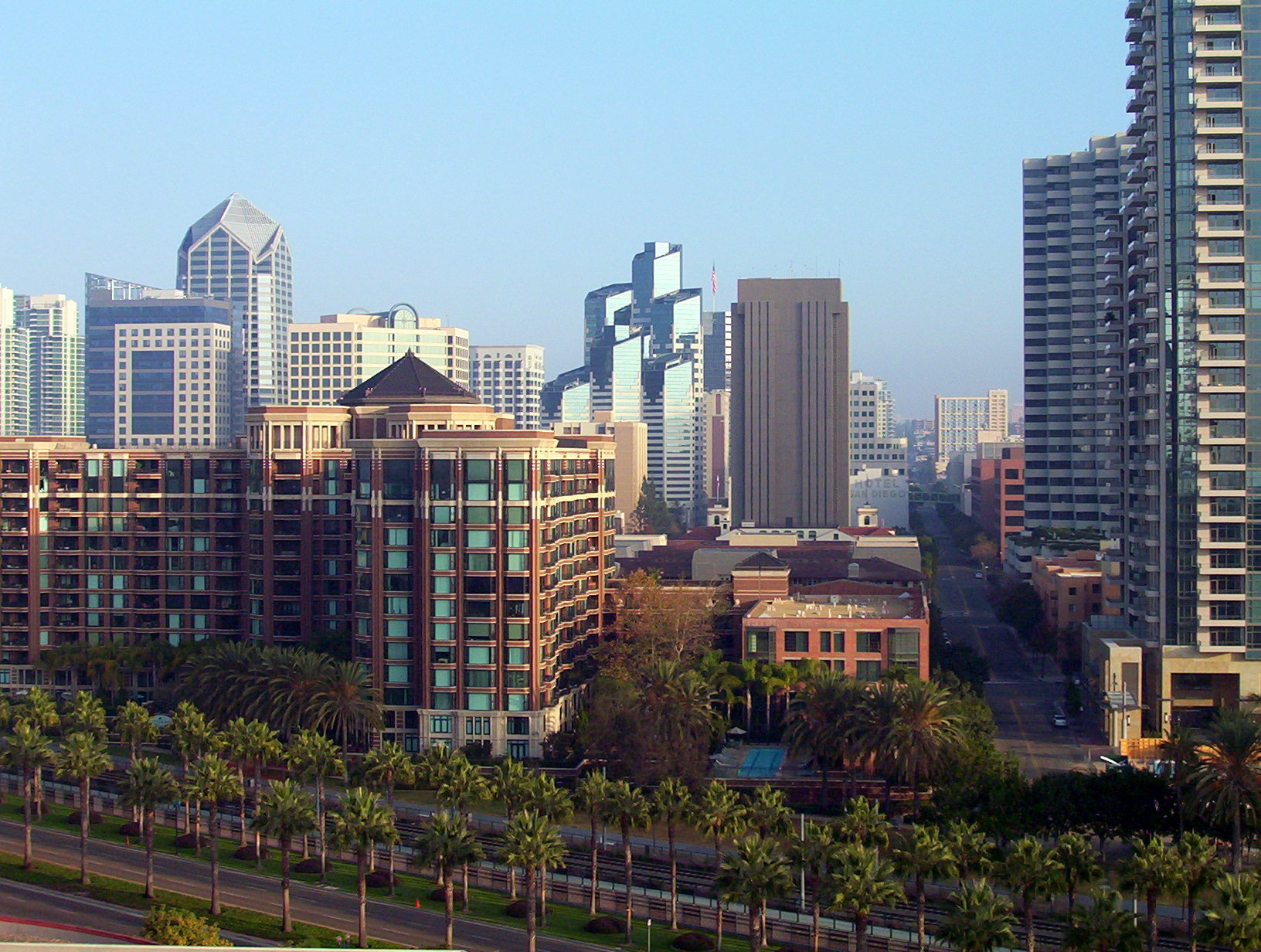
23 - San Diego, California

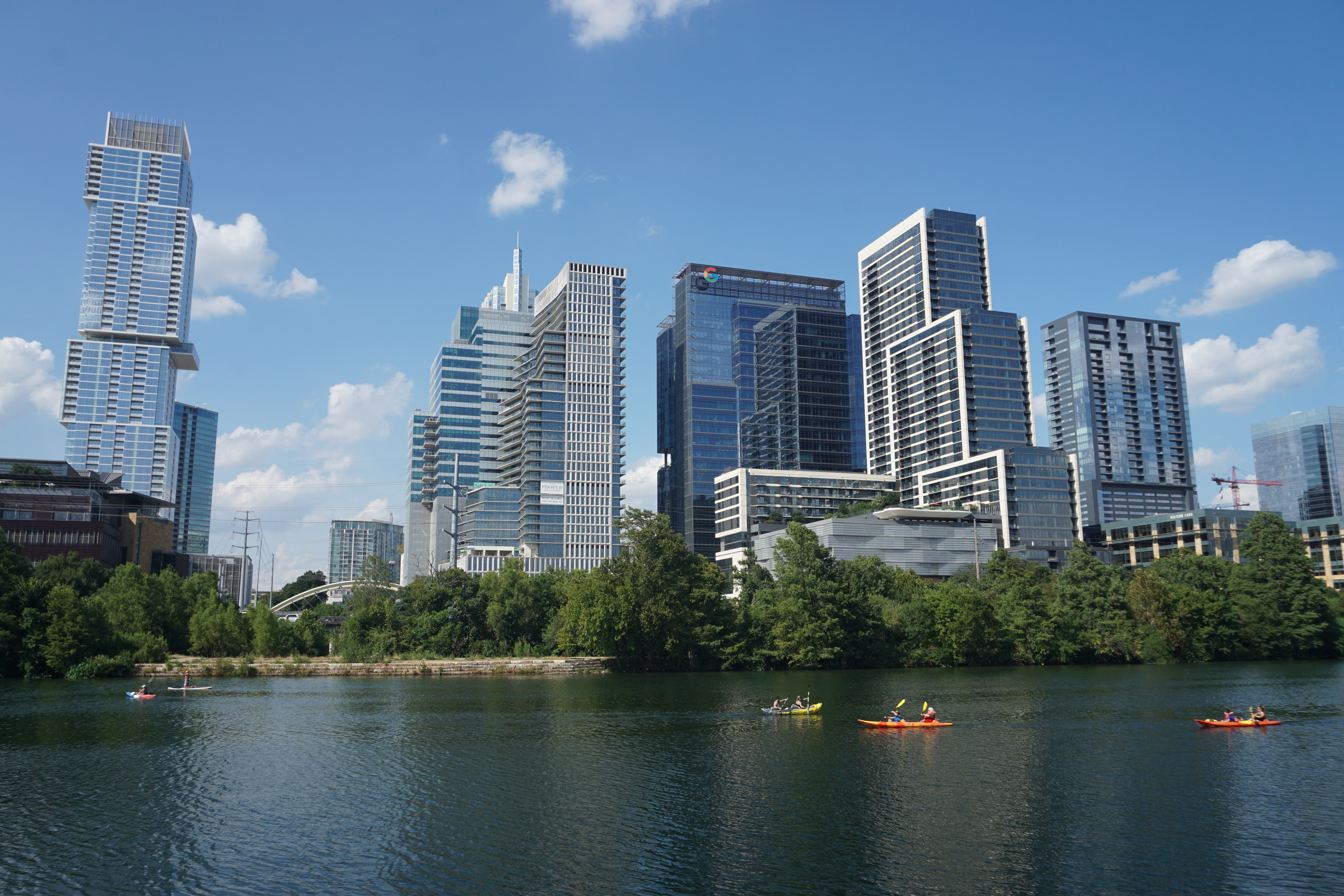
22 - Austin, Texas

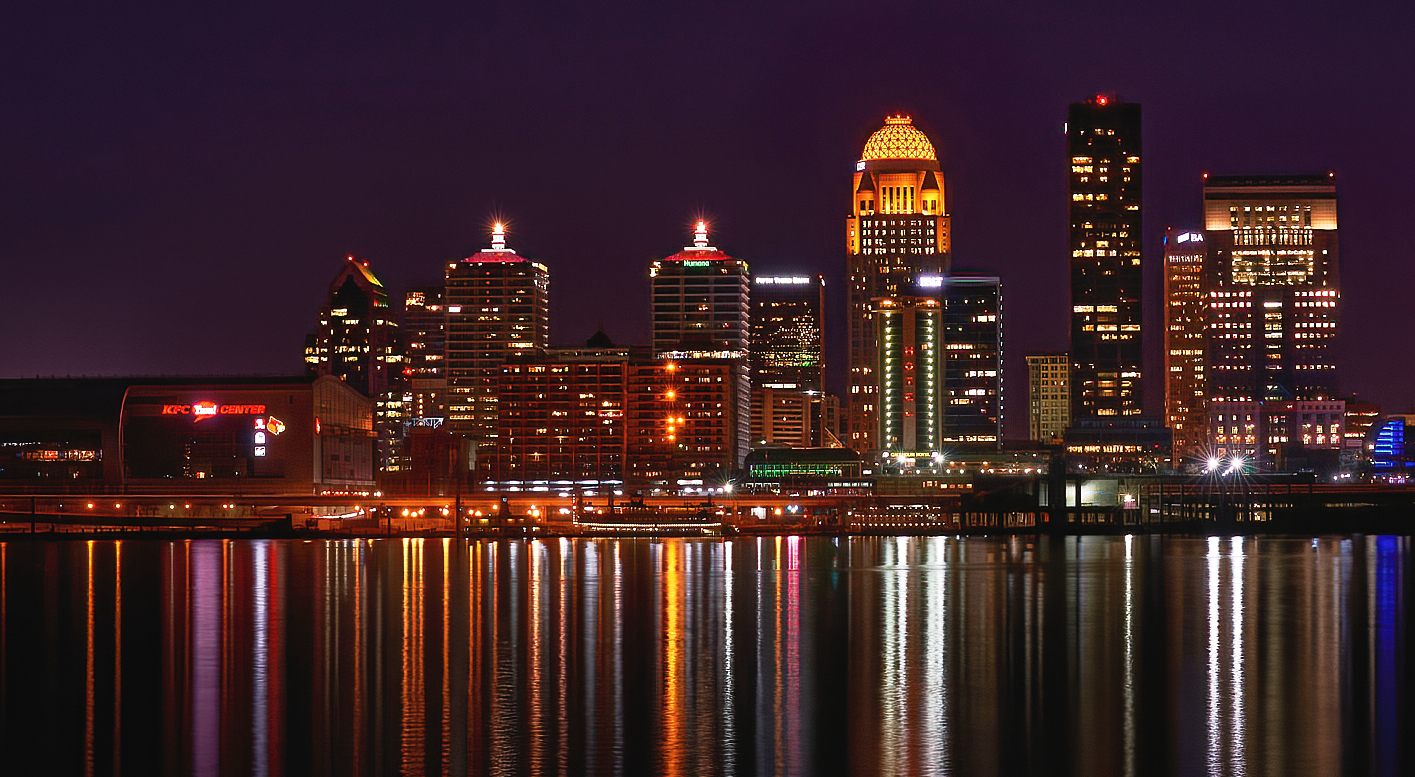
24 - Louisville, Kentucky

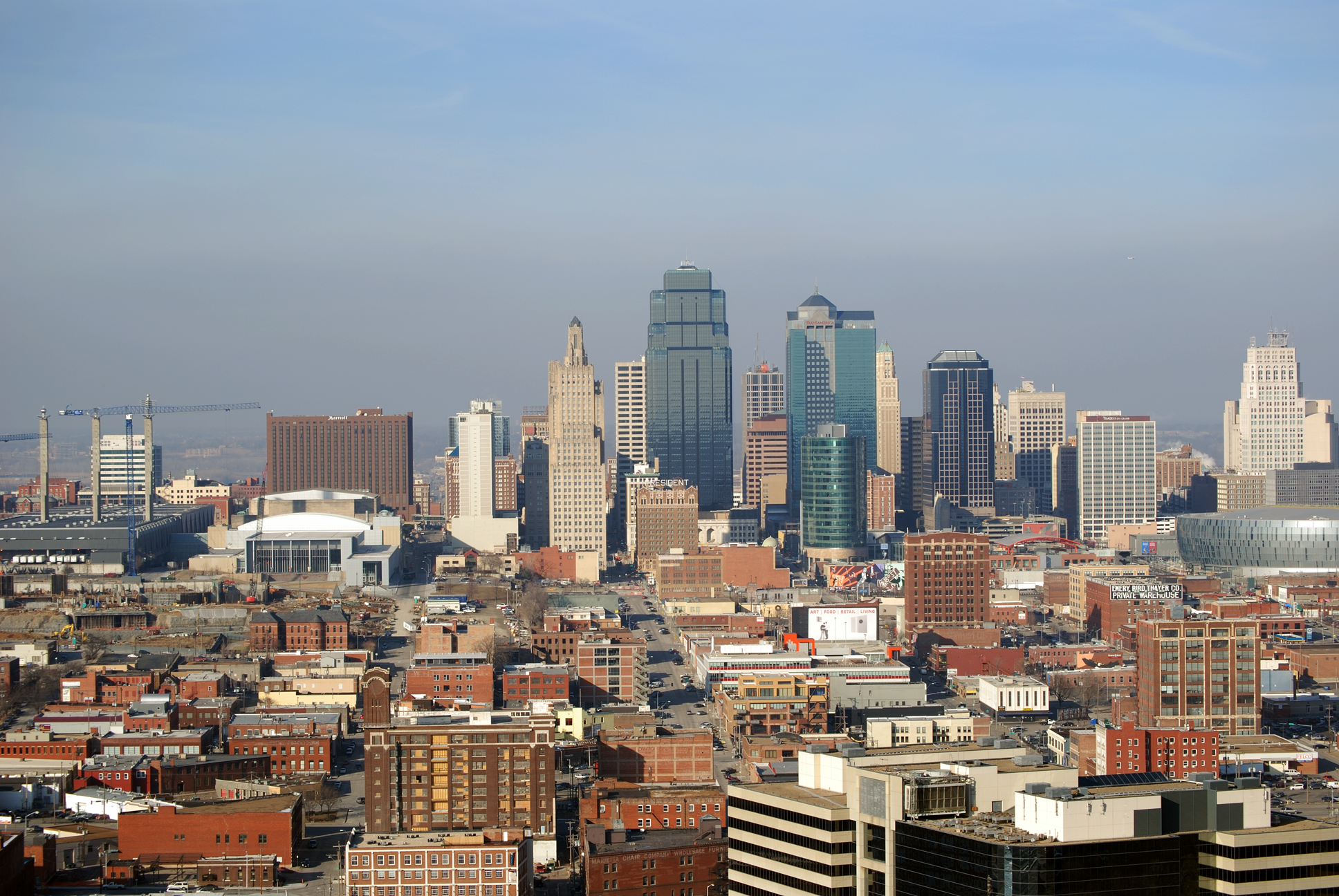
25 - Kansas City, Missouri

== See also ==
- United States of America
  - Outline of the United States
  - Index of United States-related articles
  - United States Census Bureau
    - Demographics of the United States
      - Urbanization in the United States
      - List of U.S. states and territories by population
      - List of U.S. cities by population
  - United States Office of Management and Budget
    - Statistical area (United States)
      - Combined statistical area (list)
      - Core-based statistical area (list)
        - Metropolitan statistical area (list)
        - Micropolitan statistical area (list)
- Largest cities in the United States by population by decade
- List of cities proper by population (most populous cities in the World)
- List of lists of settlements in the United States
