= List of the largest urban agglomerations in North America =

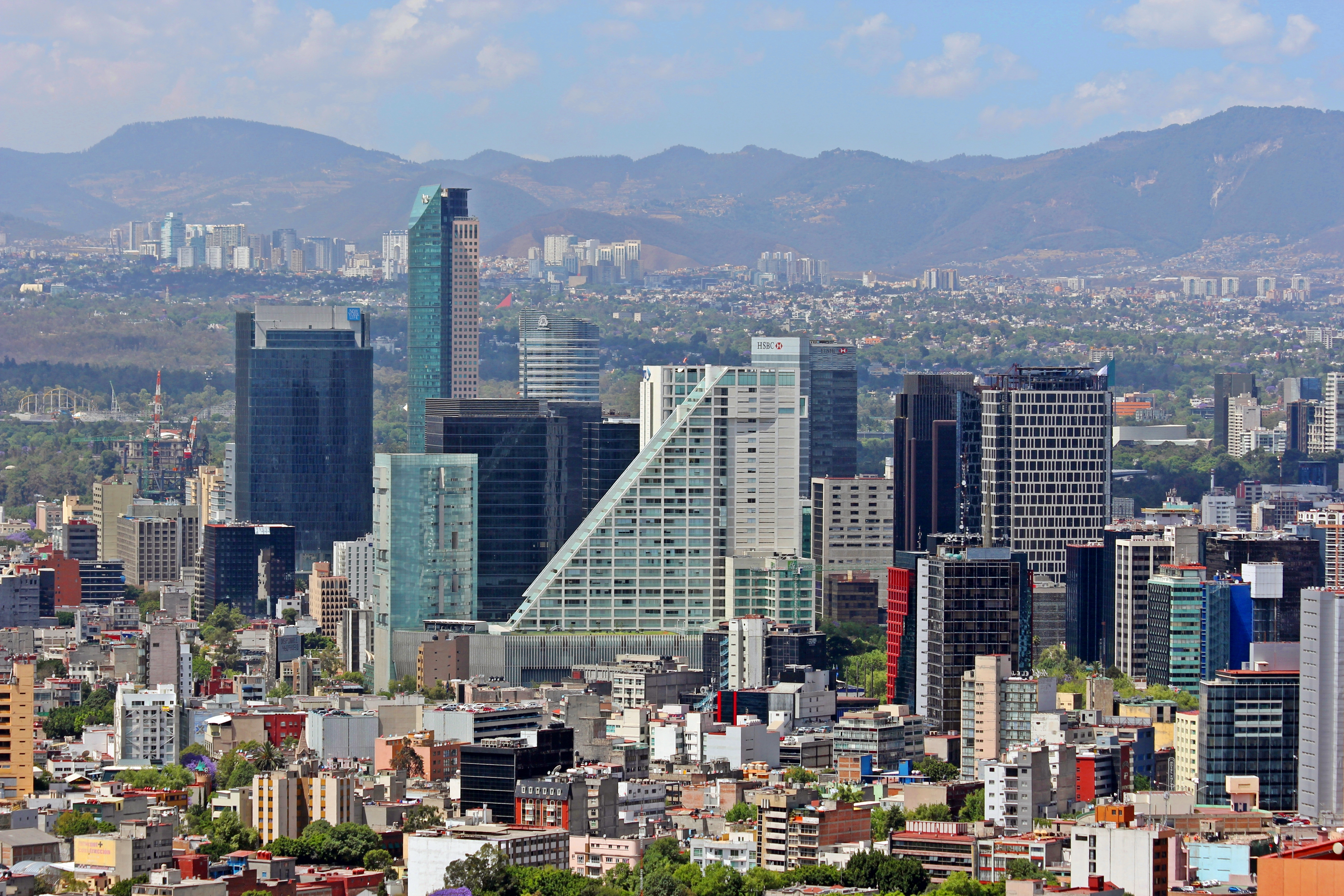
Mexico City

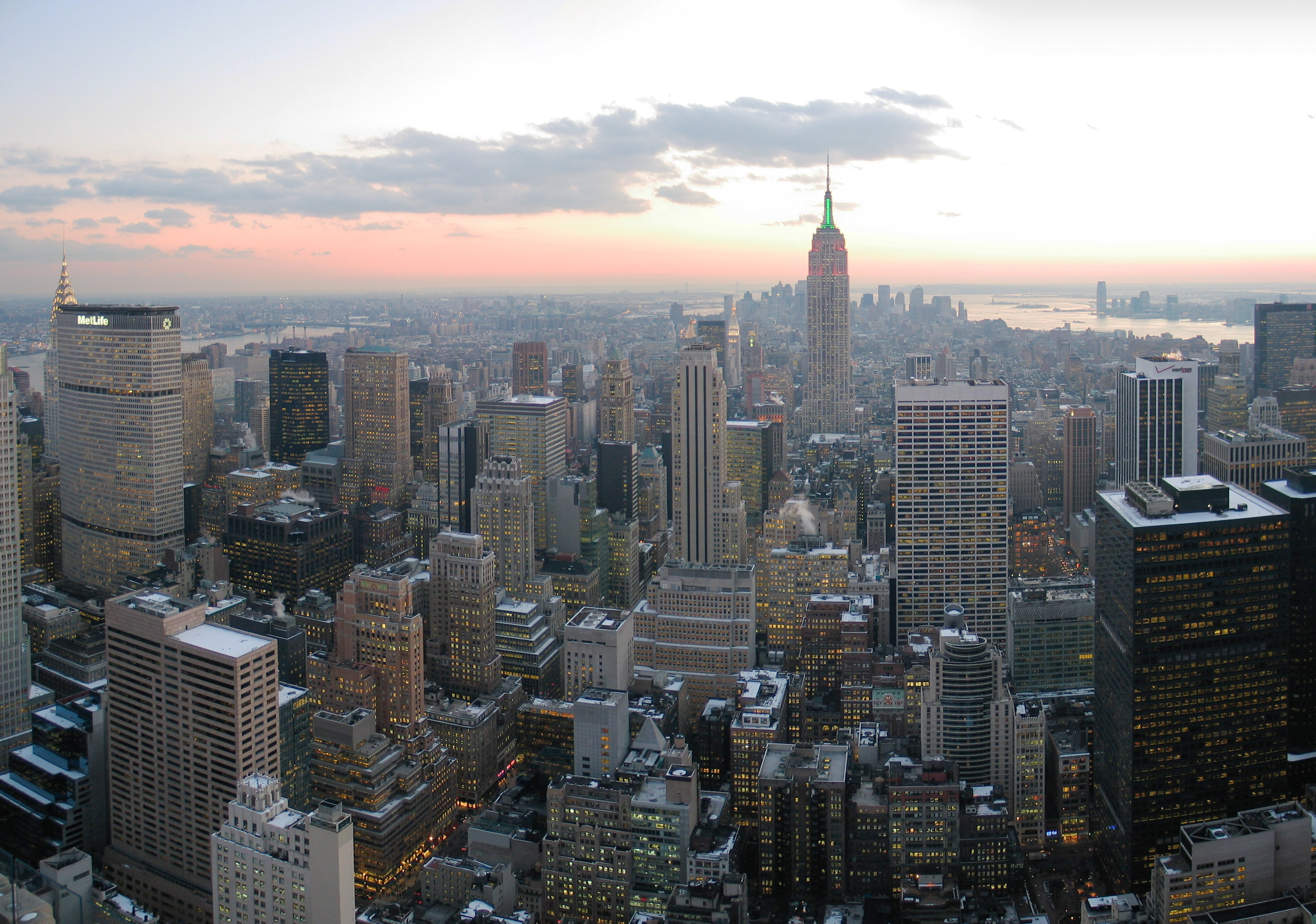
New York City

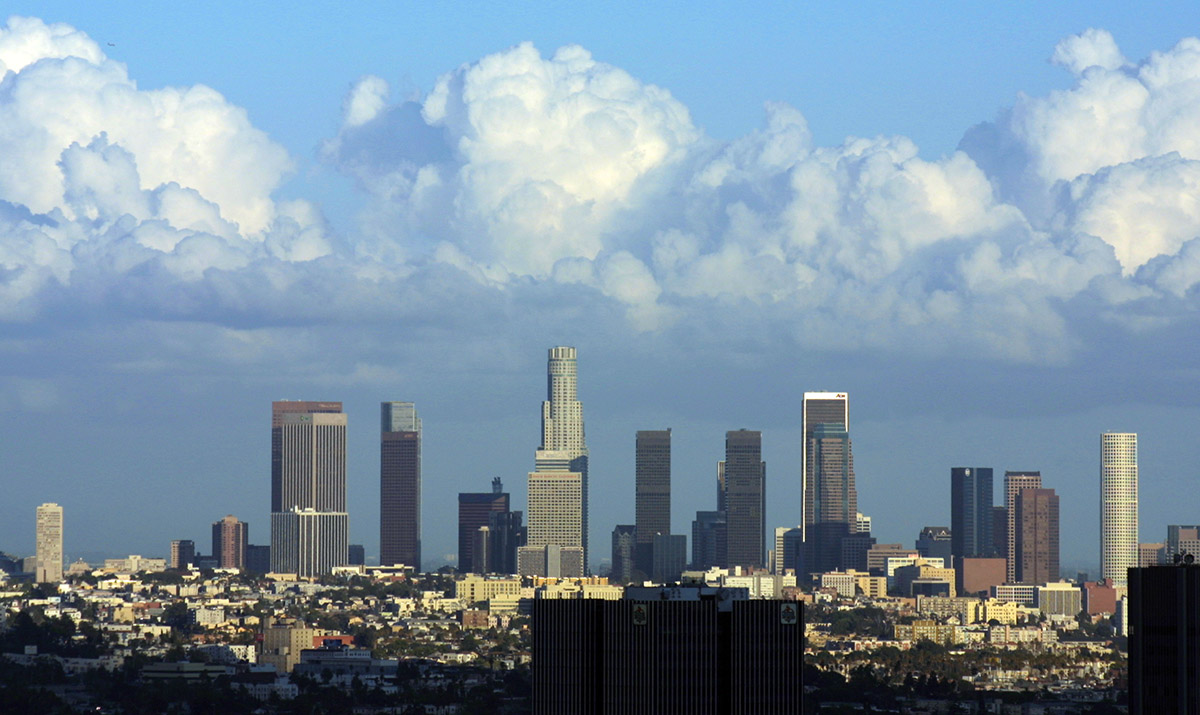
Los Angeles

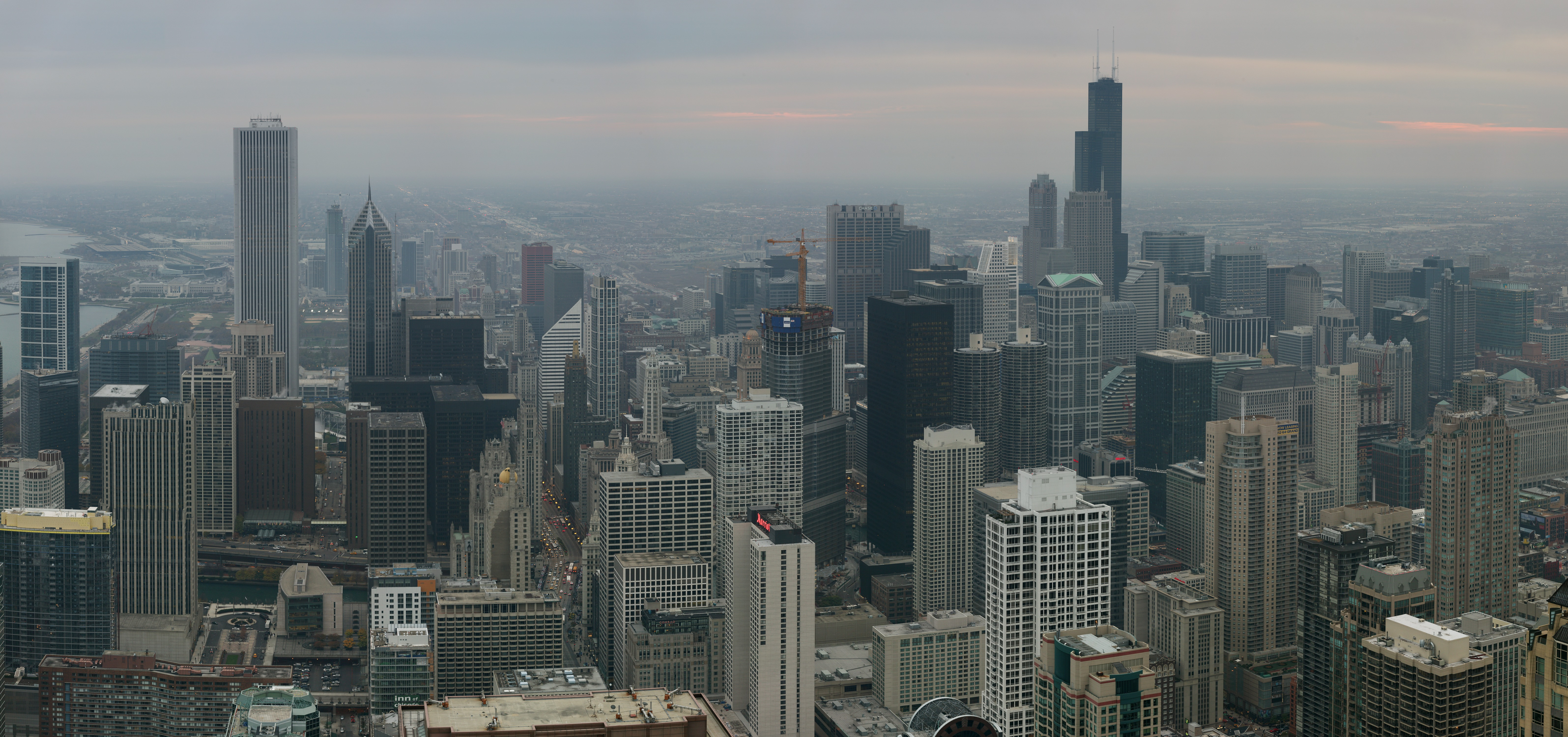
Chicago

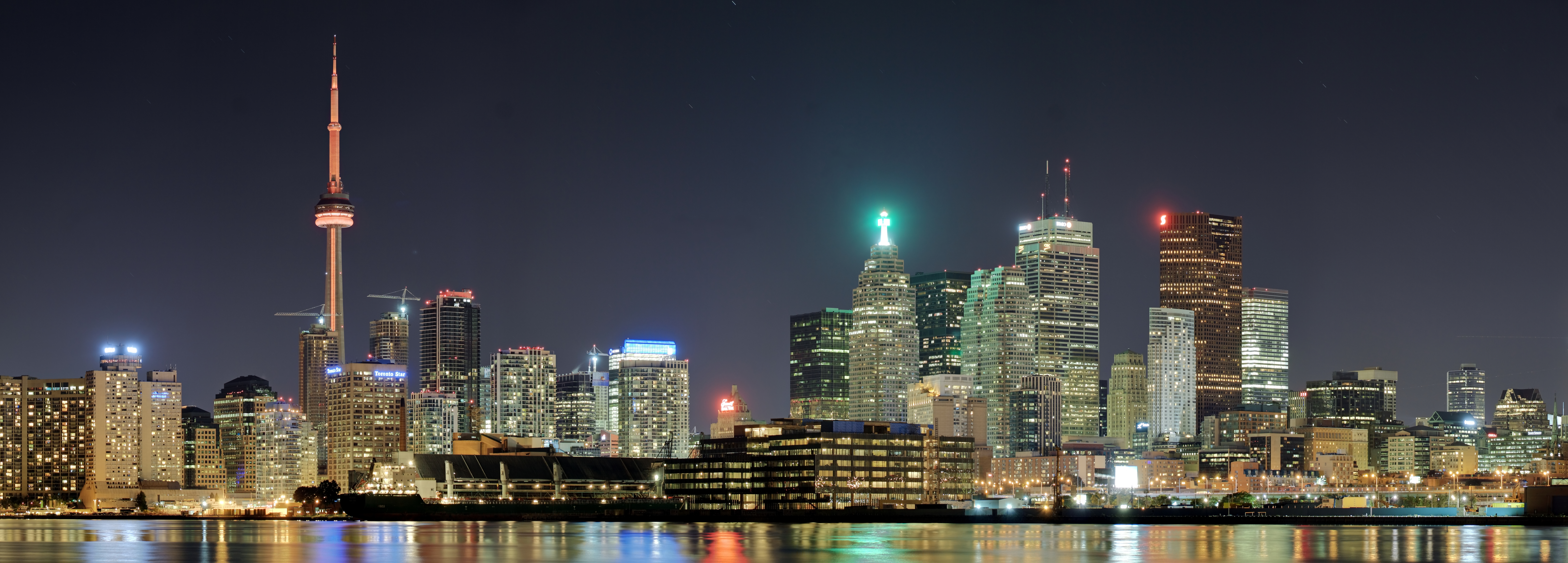
Toronto

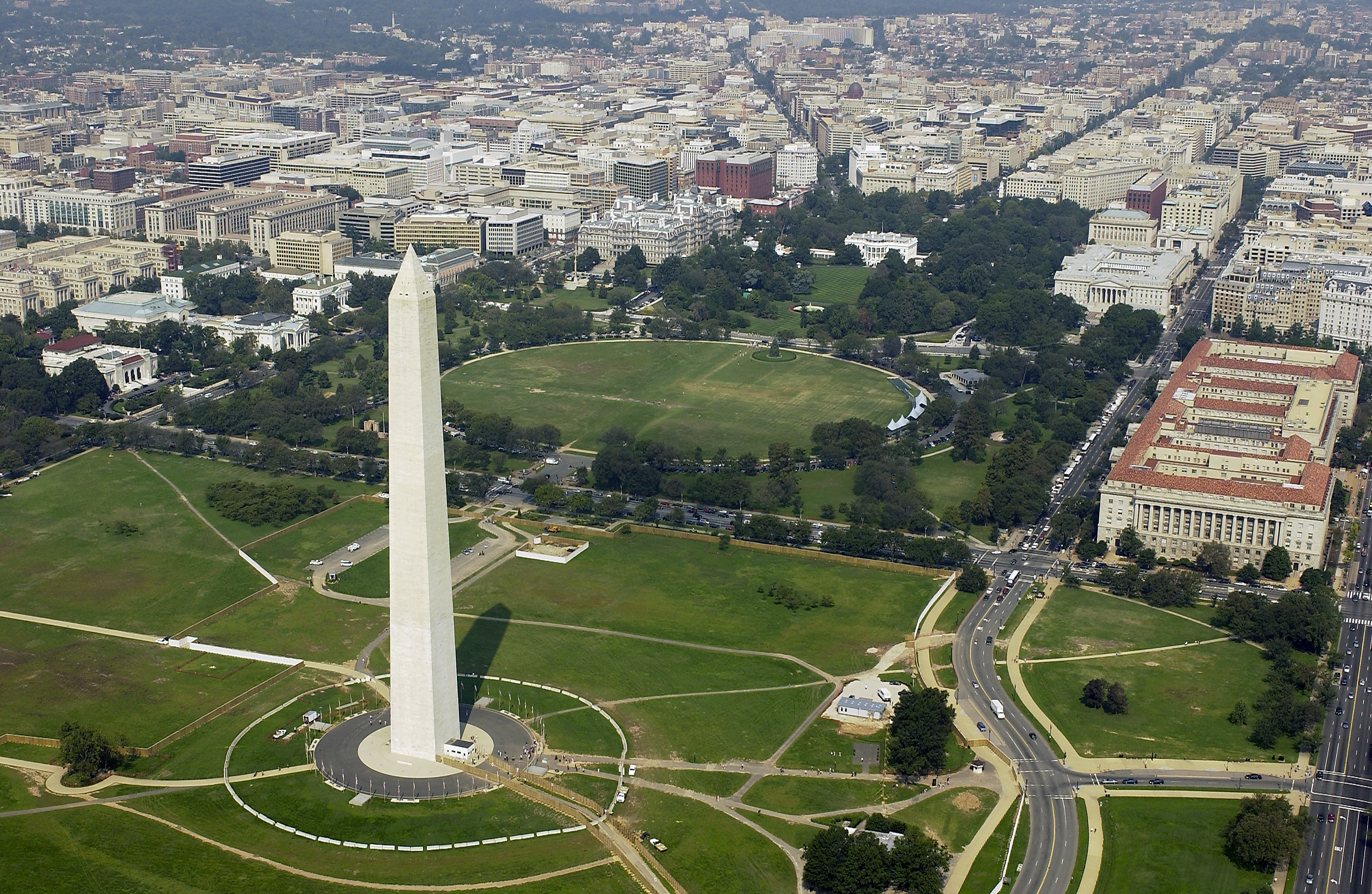
Washington, D.C.

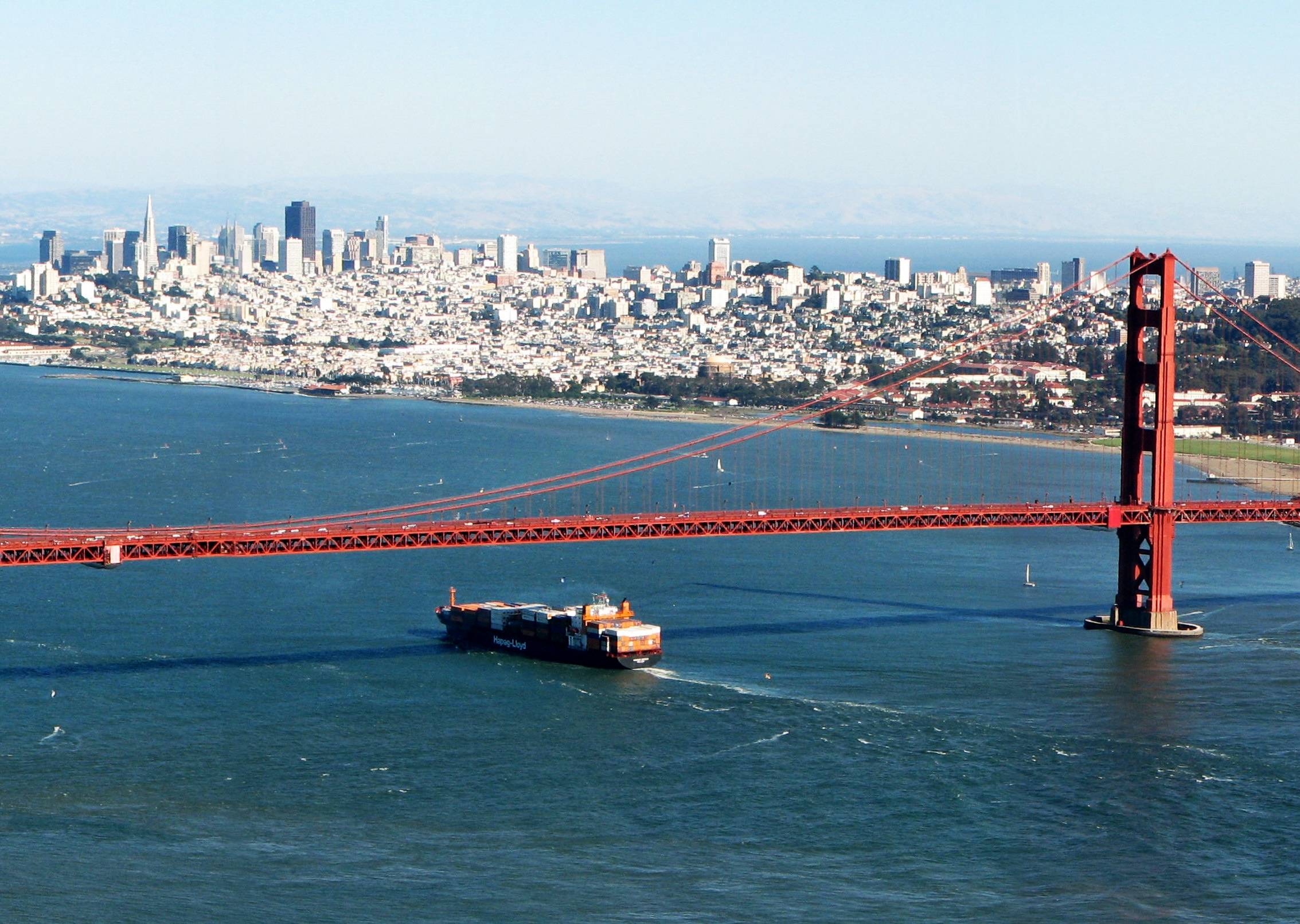
San Francisco

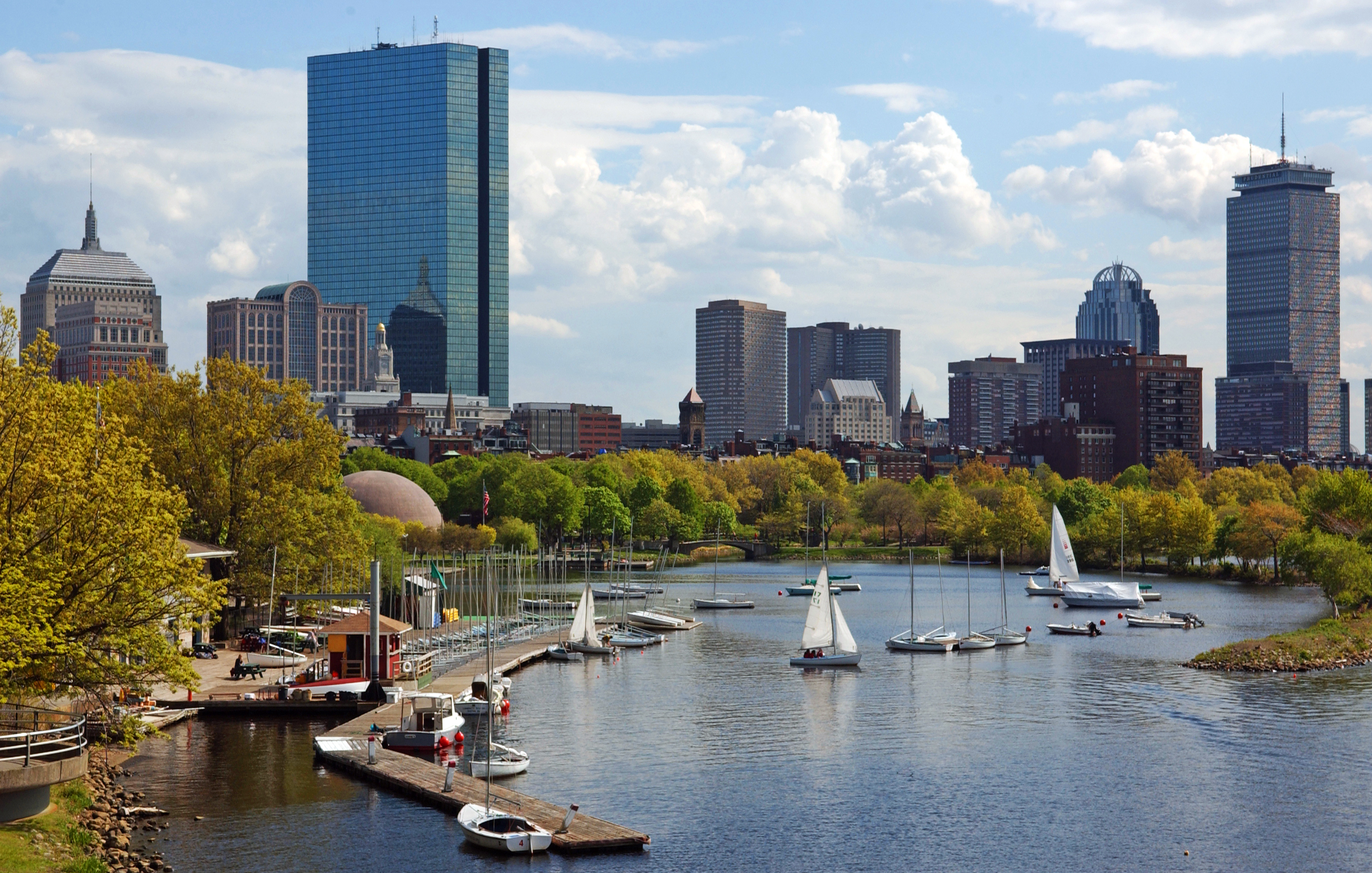
Boston

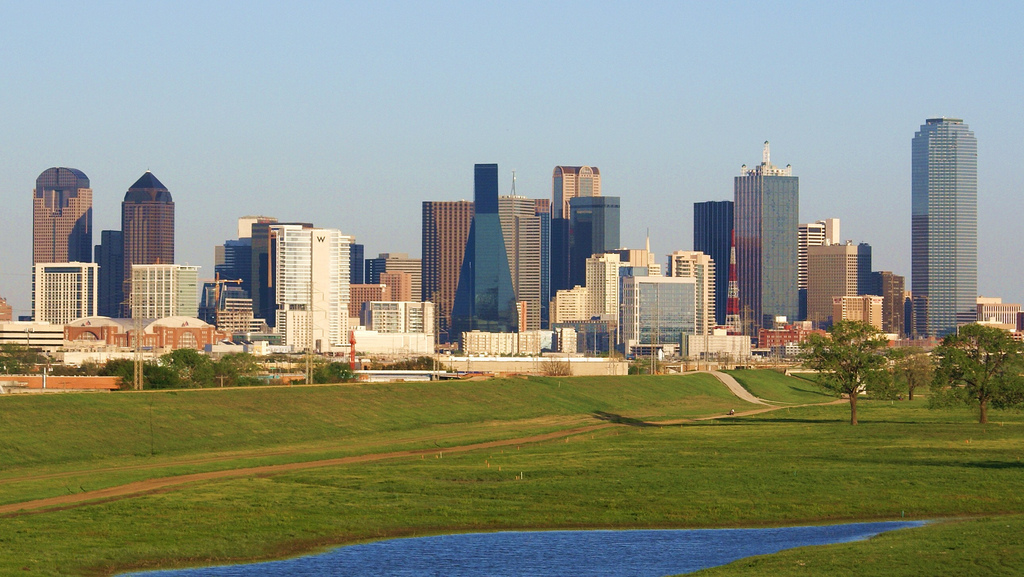
Dallas

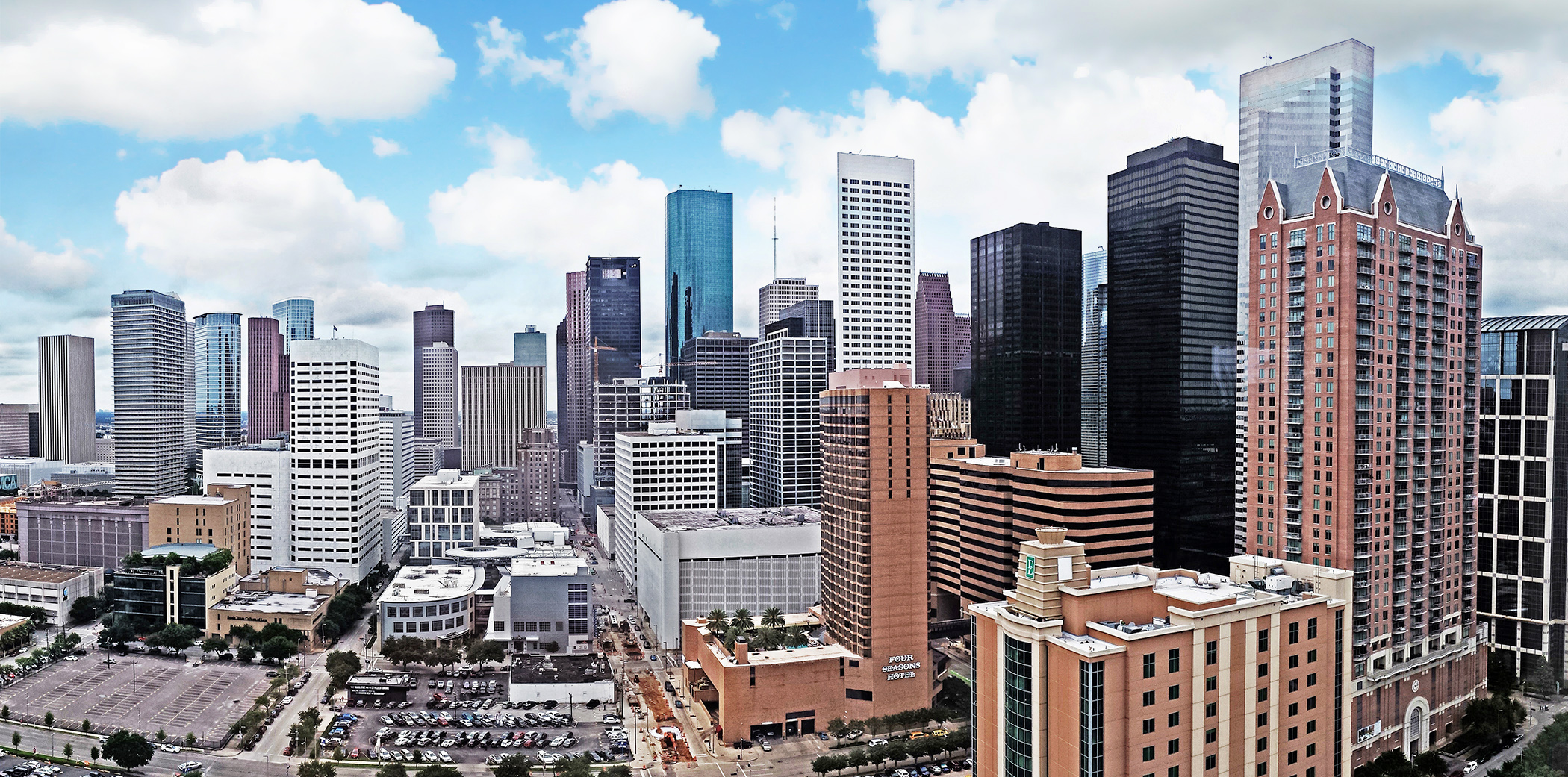
Houston

This is a list of the largest urban agglomerations in North America. It includes the 50 most populated urban agglomerations as determined by either CityPopulation.de or Demographia. Demographia's analytical tool is the "urban area" which may be considered as a narrower construct than the "urban agglomeration" which often include more peripheral suburbs.

Name	Main Country	Rank	City Population estimate	Rank	Demographia estimate
Mexico City	Mexico	1	24,900,000	1	21,905,000
New York City	United States	2	23,100,000	2	21,396,000
Los Angeles	United States	3	17,700,000	3	15,587,000
Chicago	United States	4	9,900,000	4	8,954,000
Toronto	Canada	5	9,765,188	9	6,837,000
Washington	United States	6	8,800,000	5	7,853,000
San Francisco	United States	7	7,950,000	8	6,844,000
Boston	United States	8	7,850,000	6	7,429,000
Dallas	United States	9	7,550,000	7	6,979,000
Philadelphia	United States	10	7,550,000	12	5,795,000
Houston	United States	11	7,050,000	10	6,703,000
Miami	United States	12	6,450,000	11	6,139,000
Atlanta	United States	13	6,100,000	13	5,702,000
Detroit	United States	14	5,850,000	18	4,258,000
Monterrey	Mexico	15	5,850,000	14	4,674,000
Guadalajara	Mexico	16	5,750,000	16	4,401,000
Phoenix	United States	17	4,825,000	15	4,617,000
Tampa	United States	18	4,750,000	21	3,203,000
Seattle	United States	19	4,625,000	19	4,001,000
Montréal	Canada	20	4,325,000	20	3,750,000
Puebla	Mexico	21	4,175,000	34	2,106,000
Santo Domingo	Dominican Republic	22	4,175,000	17	4,345,000
Denver	United States	23	3,950,000	30	2,308,000
Orlando	United States	24	3,725,000	23	3,075,000
Port-au-Prince	Haiti	25	3,525,000	45	1,712,000
Guatemala City	Guatemala	26	3,325,000	27	2,765,000
Minneapolis	United States	27	3,300,000	26	2,796,000
San Diego	United States	28	3,300,000	22	3,078,000
Cleveland	United States	29	3,100,000	25	2,871,000
Vancouver	Canada	30	3,025,000	28	2,484,000
Cincinnati	United States	31	2,825,000	47	1,698,000
Toluca	Mexico	32	2,650,000	49	1,672,000
Salt Lake City	United States	33	2,625,000	29	2,463,000
Charlotte	United States	34	2,575,000	24	2,879,000
Portland	United States	35	2,500,000	33	2,117,000
San José	Costa Rica	36	2,425,000	35	2,106,000
Las Vegas	United States	37	2,375,000	31	2,260,000
Saint Louis	United States	38	2,350,000	32	2,247,000
San Antonio	United States	39	2,325,000	36	2,088,000
Havana	Cuba	40	2,225,000	42	1,752,000
León	Mexico	41	2,225,000	53	1,568,000
Tijuana	Mexico	42	2,200,000	46	1,712,000
Austin	United States	43	2,175,000	39	1,943,000
Sacramento	United States	44	2,175,000	38	1,976,000
Indianapolis	United States	45	2,100,000	44	1,733,000
Kansas City	United States	46	2,100,000	41	1,794,000
Pittsburgh	United States	47	2,075,000	43	1,738,000
Jacksonville	United States	48	2,025,000	56	1,306,000
San Salvador	El Salvador	49	1,930,000	48	1,677,000
San Juan	United States	50	1,910,000	40	1,846,000
Panama City	Panama	57	1,620,000	37	2,067,000
Columbus	United States	51	1,840,000	50	1,599,000

== See also ==
- List of North American metropolitan areas by population
- List of the largest metropolitan areas in the Americas
- List of North American cities by population
- List of largest cities
