= Louisville/Jefferson County metro government (balance), Kentucky =

Statistical entity in the U.S. state of Kentucky

Coordinates: 38°09′59″N 85°38′54″W

Territory in yellow represents the "balance" population of Louisville.

The Louisville/Jefferson County metro government (balance) is a statistical entity in the U.S. state of Kentucky defined by the United States Census Bureau to represent the portion of the consolidated city-county of Louisville-Jefferson County that does not include any of the 83 separate incorporated places (municipalities) located within the city and county. It is made of the portion of Jefferson County that was the city of Louisville prior to the 2003 creation of Louisville Metro, plus a large swath of previously unincorporated territory.

In the 2010 United States census, the balance had a population of 597,337, while the 2010 population of the entire governmental area was 741,096. It is also located within the Louisville-Jefferson County, KY-IN Metropolitan Statistical Area.

== See also ==
- Indianapolis (balance)
- Jeffersonville, Indiana
- Nashville-Davidson (balance), Tennessee
