= Nashville-Davidson (balance), Tennessee =

Balance of Davidson County, Tennessee, United States

Nashville-Davidson (balance) is the name used by the U.S. Census Bureau to designate the portion of Davidson County, Tennessee, United States that does not include satellite cities of Nashville. Because Nashville and Davidson County share a consolidated metropolitan government, the parts of these cities that fall within Davidson County are considered part of Nashville, although they still retain their own municipal governments. The cities that are a part of Nashville-Davidson County, but are excluded from the balance are:

- Belle Meade
- Berry Hill
- Forest Hills
- Goodlettsville (partially)
- Oak Hill
- Ridgetop (partially)

A seventh satellite city, Lakewood, had its charter dissolved after a referendum on March 15, 2011, upon which its residents were merged into the balance population.

The balance includes the area of Davidson County that made up the City of Nashville prior to the 1963 merger with Davidson County as well as large areas of previously unincorporated land.

As of 2017, the balance population was 667,560. The 2000 population was 545,524.

== Geography ==
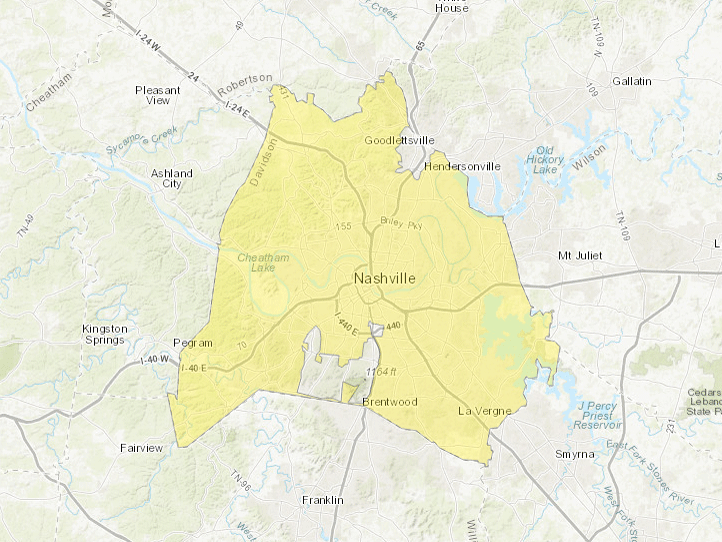
2017 map of Nashville-Davidson balance (in yellow)

The Nashville-Davidson balance is centered at 36°9′17″N 86°45′43″W.

According to the United States Census Bureau, the balance has a total area of 1,287.2 km^{2} (497.0 sq mi). 1,225.9 km^{2} (473.3 sq mi) of it is land and 61.4 km^{2} (23.7 sq mi) of it (4.77%) is water.

== Demographics ==
As of the census of 2000, there were 545,524 people, 227,403 households, and 131,211 families residing in the balance. The population density was 445.0 people/km^{2} (1,153 people/mi^{2}). There were 242,451 housing units at an average density of 197.8 units/km^{2} (512 units/mi^{2}). The racial makeup of the balance was 65.91% White, 26.81% Black or African American, 0.30% Native American, 2.38% Asian, 0.07% Pacific Islander, 2.51% from other races, and 2.02% from two or more races. Hispanics or Latinos of any race were 4.72% of the population.

There were 227,403 households, out of which 26.5% had children under the age of 18 living with them, 39.1% were married couples living together, 14.6% had a female householder with no husband present, and 42.3% were non-families. 33.8% of all households were made up of individuals, and 8.2% had someone living alone who was 65 years of age or older. The average household size was 2.29 and the average family size was 2.96.

The age distribution was 22.1% under the age of 18, 11.9% from 18 to 24, 34.3% from 25 to 44, 20.8% from 45 to 64, and 11.0% who were 65 years of age or older. The median age was 34 years. For every 100 females, there were 93.8 males. For every 100 females age 18 and over, there were 90.8 males.

The median income for a household in the balance was $39,232, and the median income for a family was $48,448. Males had a median income of $33,114; versus $27,659 for females. The per capita income for the balance was $22,018. About 10.2% of families and 13.3% of the population were below the poverty line, including 19.5% of those under age 18 and 10.8% of those age 65 or over.

== Education ==
Metropolitan Nashville Public School District is the school district for all of Davidson County.

== See also ==
- Indianapolis (balance), Indiana
- Louisville/Jefferson County metro government (balance), Kentucky
