= List of North American metropolitan areas by population =

This is a list of the fifty most populous metropolitan areas in North America. Where available, it uses official definitions of metropolitan areas based on the concept of a single urban core and its immediate surroundings, as opposed to polycentric conurbations. These definitions vary from country to country. For example, for U.S. cities, the list uses Metropolitan Statistical Areas as defined by the United States Census Bureau, and for Canadian cities, the list uses Census Metropolitan Areas as defined by Statistics Canada. Havana has no official definition of its metropolitan area; the population within its city limits is given instead.

Metropolitan area	Country	Population	Year	Official name
Mexico City	Mexico	22,752,682	2025	Zona Metropolitana del Valle de México
New York	United States	21,000,000	2025	New York-Newark-Jersey City, NY-NJ Metro Area
Los Angeles	United States	12,678,000	2025	Los Angeles-Long Beach-Anaheim, CA MSA
Chicago	United States	9,434,123	2025	Chicago-Naperville-Elgin, IL-IN MSA
Dallas–Fort Worth	United States	8,477,157	2025	Dallas-Fort Worth-Arlington, TX Metro Area.
Houston	United States	7,904,627	2025	Houston-Pasadena-The Woodlands, TX MSA
Toronto	Canada	7,108,874	2025	Toronto Census Metropolitan Area, Ontario
Atlanta	United States	6,482,182	2025	Atlanta-Sandy Springs-Roswell, GA Metro Area
Washington, D.C.	United States	6,465,724	2025	Washington-Arlington-Alexandria, DC-VA-MD-WV MSA
Miami	United States	6,391,072	2025	Miami-Fort Lauderdale-West Palm Beach, FL Metro Area
Philadelphia	United States	6,329,118	2025	Philadelphia-Camden-Wilmington, PA-NJ-DE-MD MSA
Monterrey	Mexico	5,341,171	2020	
Guadalajara	Mexico	5,286,642	2020	
Phoenix	United States	5,228,938	2025	Phoenix-Mesa-Chandler, AZ MSA
Boston	United States	5,034,221	2025	Boston-Cambridge-Newton, MA-NH MSA
Inland Empire	United States	4,669,149	2022	Riverside-San Bernardino-Ontario, CA MSA
San Francisco Bay Area	United States	4,648,486	2024	San Francisco-Oakland-Fremont, CA Metro Area
Montreal	Canada	4,615,154	2024	Montréal Census Metropolitan Area, Québec
Detroit	United States	4,400,578	2025	Detroit-Warren-Dearborn, MI
Santo Domingo	Dominican Republic	4,274,651	2022	
Seattle	United States	4,145,494	2024	Seattle-Tacoma-Bellevue, WA MSA
Minneapolis–St. Paul	United States	3,757,952	2024	Minneapolis-St. Paul-Bloomington, MN-WI MSA
Tampa Bay Area	United States	3,424,560	2024	Tampa-St. Petersburg-Clearwater, FL MSA
San Diego	United States	3,295,298	2020	San Diego-Chula Vista-Carlsbad, CA Metro Area (2020): 3,295,298.
Puebla	Mexico	3,199,530	2020	
San Jose	Costa Rica	3,160,000	2021	
Guatemala City	Guatemala	3,160,000	2024	(Note: In 2005, Guatemala City's metropolitan area was defined by its government as consisting of the municipalities of Amatitlán, Chinautla, Guatemala City proper, Mixco, San Miguel Petapa, Santa Catarina Pinula, Villa Canales and Villa Nueva.)
Vancouver	Canada	3,108,941	2024	Vancouver Census Metropolitan Area, British Columbia Does not include Whatcom County.
Denver	United States	3,052,498	2024	Denver-Aurora-Centennial, CO MSA
Orlando	United States	2,940,513	2024	Orlando-Kissimmee-Sanford, FL Metro Area
Charlotte	United States	2,883,370	2024	Charlotte-Concord-Gastonia, NC-SC Metro Area
Baltimore	United States	2,859,024	2024	Baltimore-Columbia-Towson, MD MSA
St. Louis	United States	2,811,927	2024	St. Louis, MO-IL Metro Area.
San Antonio	United States	2,763,006	2024	San Antonio-New Braunfels, TX MSA
Port-au-Prince	Haiti	2,618,894	2015	
Austin	United States	2,550,637	2024	Austin-Round Rock-San Marcos, TX Metro Area
Portland	United States	2,537,904	2024	Portland-Vancouver-Hillsboro, OR-WA MSA
Sacramento	United States	2,463,127	2024	Sacramento-Roseville-Folsom, CA Metro Area
Pittsburgh	United States	2,429,917	2024	Pittsburgh, PA MSA
San Salvador	El Salvador	2,404,097	2022	
Las Vegas	United States	2,398,871	2024	Las Vegas-Henderson-North Las Vegas, NV Metro Area
Toluca	Mexico	2,353,924	2020	
Cincinnati	United States	2,302,815	2024	Cincinnati, OH-KY-IN MSA
Kansas City	United States	2,253,579	2024	Kansas City, MO-KS MSA
Columbus	United States	2,225,377	2024	Columbus, OH MSA
Indianapolis	United States	2,174,833	2024	Indianapolis-Carmel-Greenwood, IN Metro Area
Cleveland	United States	2,171,877	2024	Cleveland, OH MSA
Tijuana	Mexico	2,157,853	2020	
Nashville	United States	2,150,553	2024	Nashville-Davidson—Murfreesboro—Franklin, TN Metro Area
Havana	Cuba	2,137,847	2012	

== See also ==
- List of metropolitan areas in the Americas
