= Monon =

Monon may refer to:

- Monon Bell, locomotive bell that symbolizes the DePauw-Wabash football rivalry
- Monon, Indiana, United States
  - Monon Township, White County, Indiana,
  - Monon Railroad, a former railroad in Indiana
  - Monon Commercial Historic District
  - Monon Trail, a rail trail in Indiana
- Saint Monon (died c. 645), a Scottish hermit and martyr
- Salinta Monon (1920–2009), a Filipino textile weaver
- Eudesmia monon, a moth
