= Indiana State Road 143 =

State highway in Indiana, United States

State Road 143
- SR 143 highlighted in red

Route information
- Maintained by INDOT
- Length: 1.507 mi (2.425 km)

Major junctions
- West end: Jasper-Pulaski Fish and Wildlife Area
- East end: US 421 in Clarks

Location
- Country: United States
- State: Indiana
- Counties: Pulaski

Highway system
- Indiana State Highway System; Interstate; US; State; Scenic
← SR 142	→ SR 144

State Road 143 (SR 143) is a State Road in the northern section of the U.S. state of Indiana. Running for about 1.5 miles (2.4 km) in a general east–west direction, connecting Jasper-Pulaski Fish and Wildlife Area to U.S. Route 421 (US 421). SR 143 was originally introduced in the late 1930s or early 1940 routed along its modern routing. The road was paved in the 1970s.

== Route description ==
SR 143 begins at a four-way intersection with County Road 1650 West crossing north–south and County Road 550 North continues west from the western end of SR 143. The state road heads east passing the main entrance to Jasper-Pulaski Fish and Wildlife Area while passing through wooded area. The wooded area becomes farmland before SR 143 has a four-way intersection with US 421 about midway between Medaryville and San Pierre. The roadway continues east as County Road 550 North. The highest traffic count for SR 143 in 2014 was at its western end, where 295 vehicles travel the highway on average each day. The lowest traffic count during 2014 was at the eastern end of SR 143, where 264 vehicles travel the highway on average each day.

== History ==
The Indiana State Highway Commission added SR 143, along its modern routing, to the state road system between 1939 and 1941. The roadway was paved between 1972 and 1973. No major changes have occurred to SR 143 since it was paved.

== Major intersections ==
The entire route is in Cass Township, Pulaski County.

mi	km	Destinations	Notes
0.000	0.000	CR 1650 W and CR 550 N	Western terminus of SR 143
1.507	2.425	US 421	Eastern terminus of SR 143
1.000 mi = 1.609 km; 1.000 km = 0.621 mi
