= Beaver Township, Arkansas =

Beaver Township, Arkansas may refer to:

- Beaver Township, Carroll County, Arkansas
- Beaver Township, Saline County, Arkansas

== See also ==
- List of townships in Arkansas
- Beaver Township (disambiguation)
