= Beaver Township, Indiana =

Beaver Township is the name of two townships in the U.S. state of Indiana:

- Beaver Township, Newton County, Indiana
- Beaver Township, Pulaski County, Indiana

== See also ==
- Beaver Township (disambiguation)
