= Indian Creek Township, Indiana =

Indian Creek Township is the name of three townships in the U.S. state of Indiana:

- Indian Creek Township, Lawrence County, Indiana
- Indian Creek Township, Monroe County, Indiana
- Indian Creek Township, Pulaski County, Indiana
