= Lee, Indiana =

- Unincorporated community
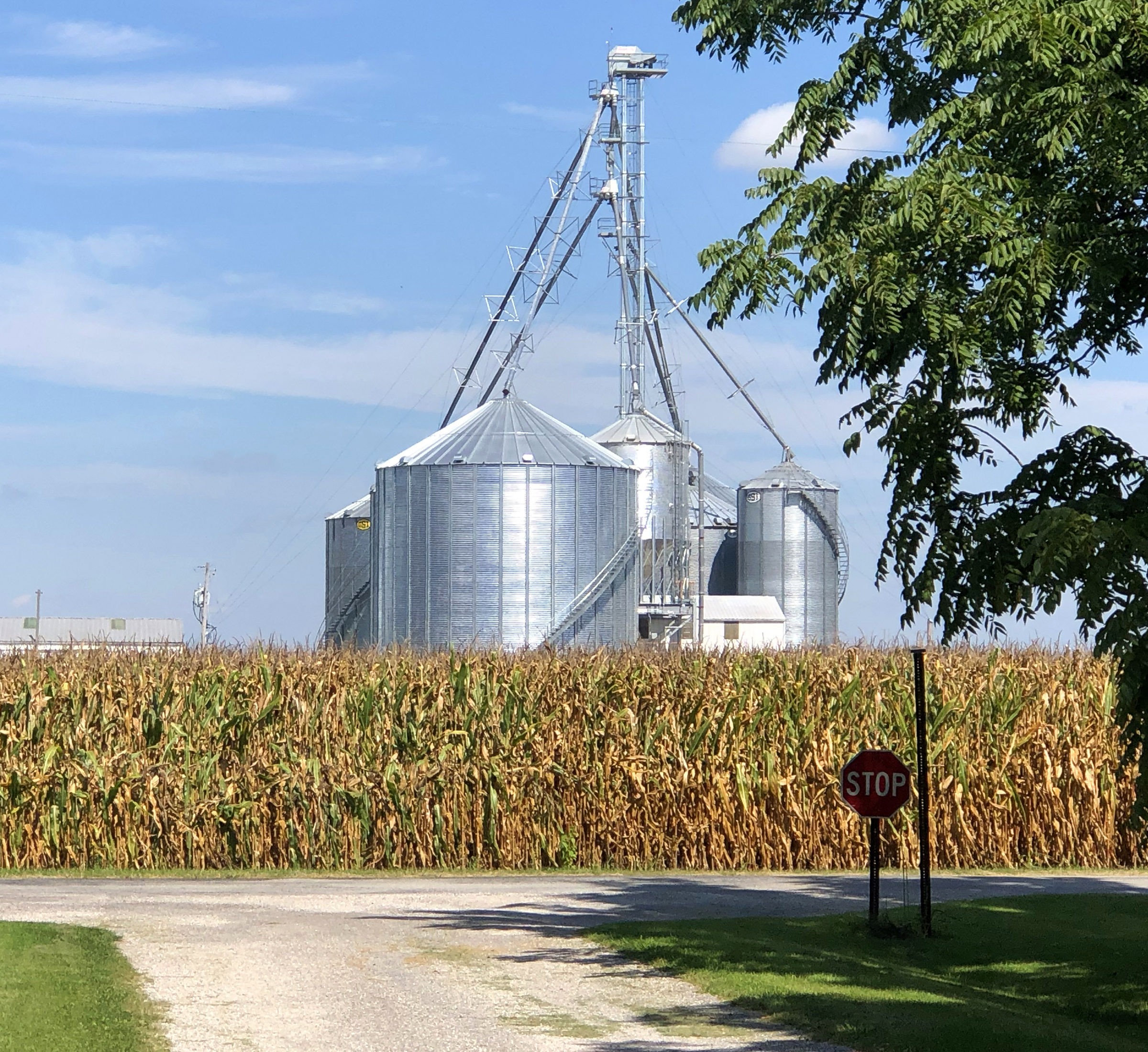
- View north from Madison Street toward corn fields and grain elevators

- Location within Indiana Location within the United States
- Coordinates: 40°53′47″N 86°58′05″W
- Country: United States
- State: Indiana
- County: White
- Township: Monon
- Established: 1883
- Platted: August 1886
- Named for: John Lee
- Elevation: 673 ft (205 m)
- Time zone: UTC-5 (Eastern (EST))
  - Summer (DST): UTC-4 (EDT)
- ZIP code: 47978
- FIPS code: 18-42642
- GNIS feature ID: 437727

Lee is an unincorporated community in Monon Township, White County, in the U.S. state of Indiana.

== History ==
The site of what is now Lee is first recorded as a station stop on the Indianapolis, Delphi and Chicago Railroad, a company which by late 1879 had completed its initial 40-mile stretch of railroad connecting Rensselaer and Delphi. The following year on 25 October a post office was established at the location to serve the rural districts northwest of Monon with Calvin Anderson as its first postmaster. Around 1884 the railroad became known as the Monon Route.

Lee was established in 1883 and named for John Lee, the president of the ID&C Railroad, who opened a grain market there. Lee's location in the northwestern portion of the county was "a rich district of drained lands, admirably adapted to live stock," and as well as a place for marketing and shipping grain it was also an important local shipping point for hay; a 1915 history notes that hundreds of tons were baled and shipped annually.

In August 1886 the location was platted under the name of Oakdale by Noble J. York, a local businessman and president of the Monon town board, and Benjamin A. Linville, but it was generally known as Lee. In 1949, a petition led to one of Lee's street being vacated .

Lee's post office closed on 30 June 1933. The line through Lee is now part of CSX Transportation Monon Subdivision and is used by Amtrak. While shown on Amtrak maps, service provided on the Cardinal (and previously also on the Hoosier State) does not stop at Lee.

In 2016, Helen Louise George, an 88-year resident of the area, published History and Reflections of Lee, Indiana which chronicles the history of Lee.

== Geography ==
Lee is located at 40°53′47″N 86°58′05″W about 5 miles (8.0 km) northwest of Monon near the intersection of County Roads 1000 North and 500 West and on the rail line between Monon and Rensselaer. The surrounding farmland is drained by Slough Creek, a tributary of the Iroquois River that flows just south of Lee in a westward direction.

== Gallery ==
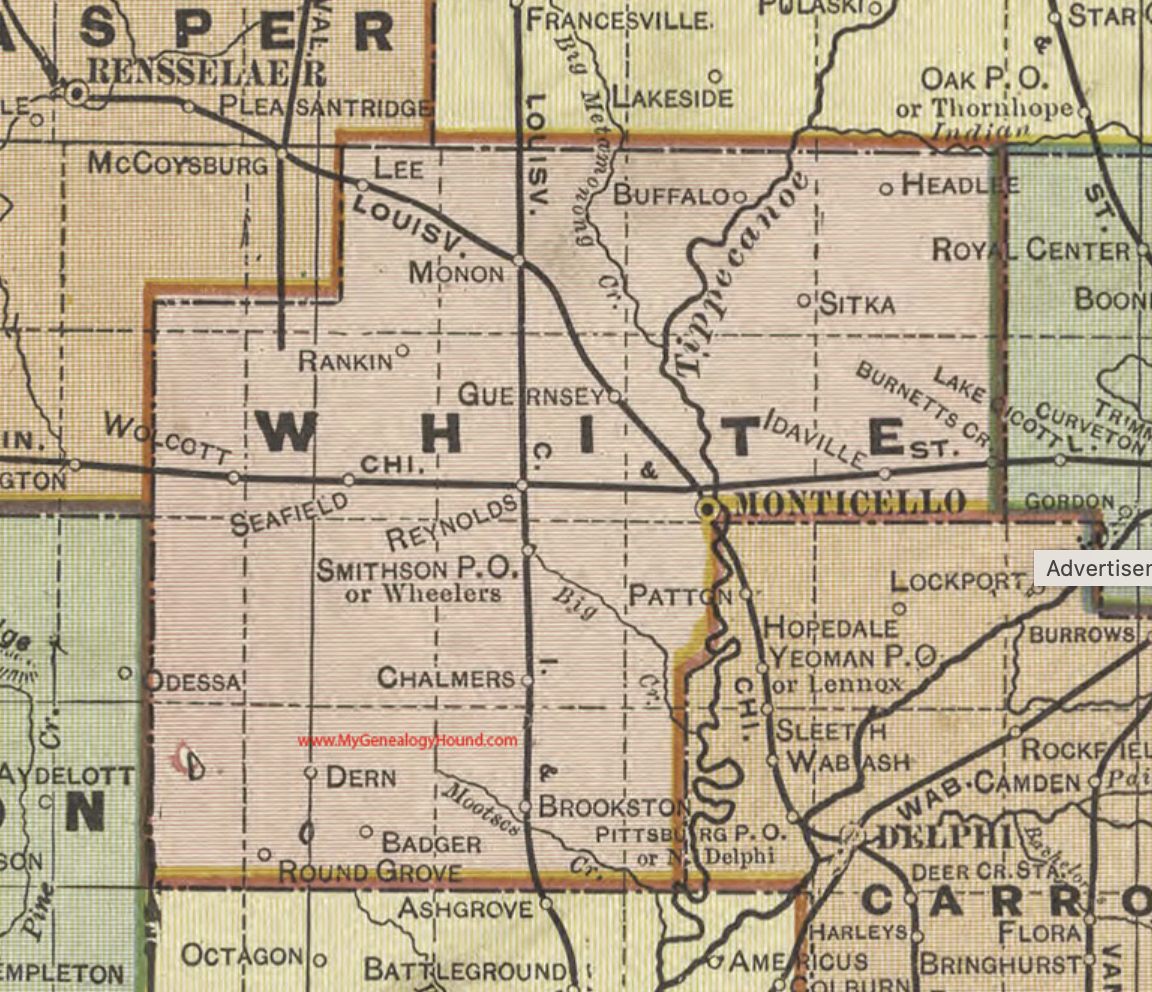
White County map, 1908

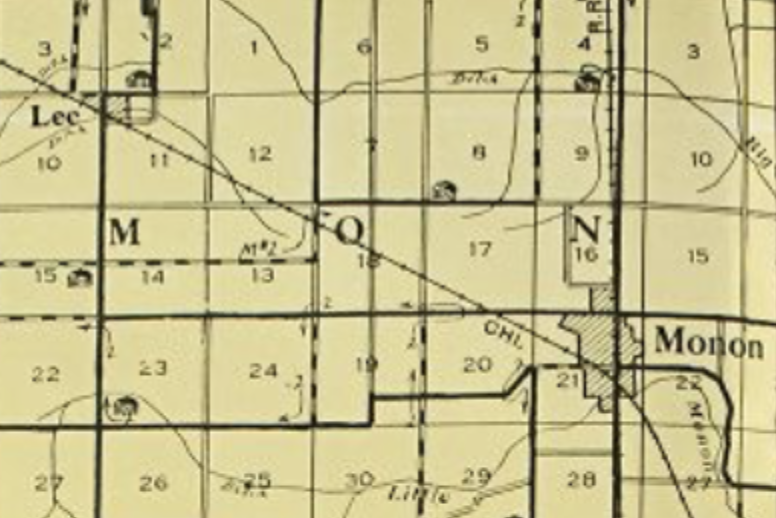
Monon Township map detail, 1920

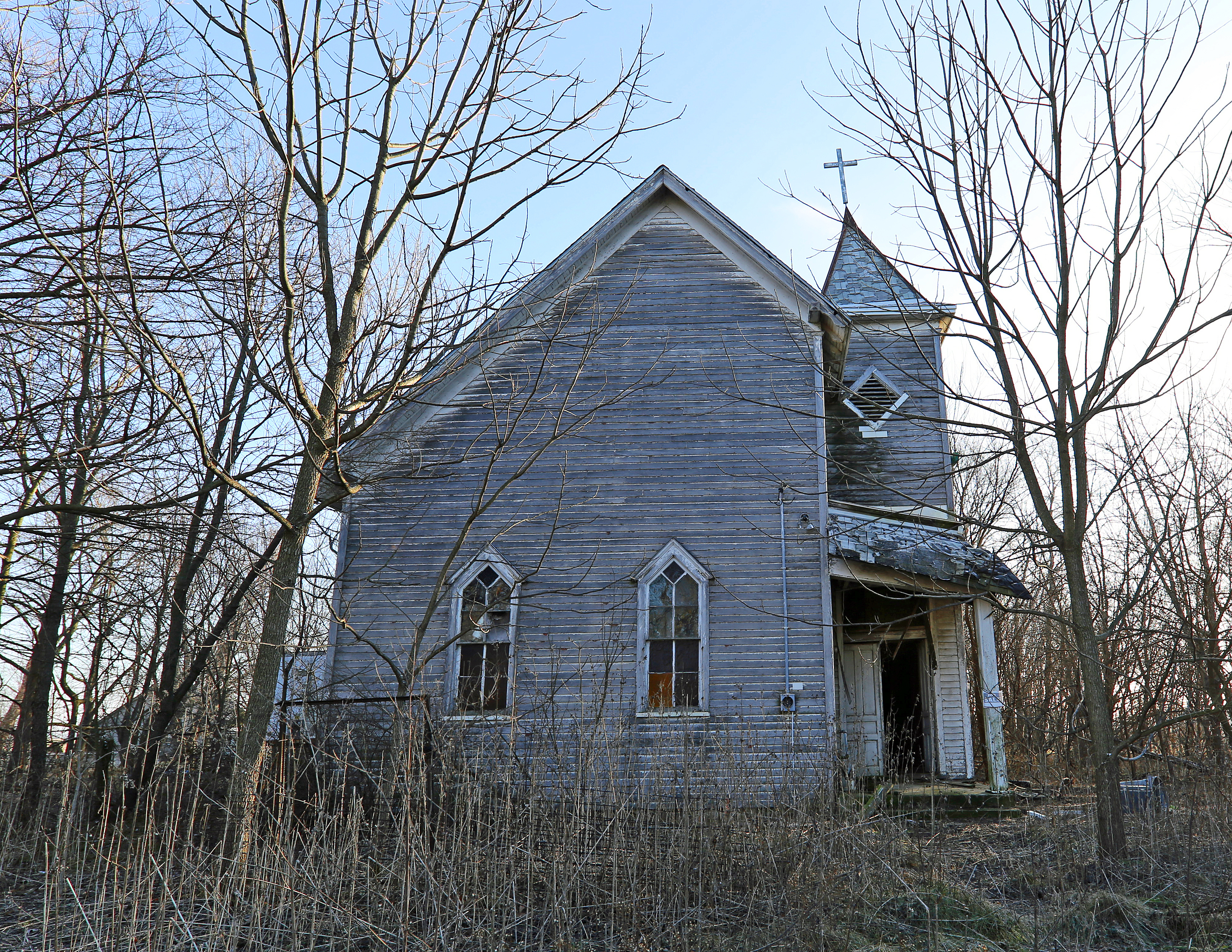
Abandoned church in Lee in 2019
