= Beaver Township, Minnesota =

Beaver Township is the name of several places in the U.S. state of Minnesota:

- Beaver Township, Aitkin County, Minnesota
- Beaver Township, Fillmore County, Minnesota
- Beaver Township, Roseau County, Minnesota

== See also ==
- Beaver Bay Township, Lake County, Minnesota
- Beaver Creek Township, Rock County, Minnesota
- Beaver Falls Township, Renville County, Minnesota
- Beaver Township (disambiguation)
