= Harrison Township, Pulaski County, Indiana =

Harrison Township
- Township
- Nickname: "Millcreekers"
- Location in Pulaski County
- Coordinates: 41°02′15″N 86°30′57″W
- Country: United States
- State: Indiana
- County: Pulaski

Government
  - Type: Indiana township

Area
  - Total: 31.6 sq mi (82 km^{2})
  - Land: 31.51 sq mi (81.6 km^{2})
  - Water: 0.09 sq mi (0.23 km^{2}) 0.28%
- Elevation: 712 ft (217 m)

Population (2020)
  - Total: 590
  - Density: 19/sq mi (7.2/km^{2})
- ZIP codes: 46939, 46960, 46985, 46996
- GNIS feature ID: 453395

Harrison Township is one of twelve townships in Pulaski County, Indiana, United States. As of the 2020 census, its population was 590 and it contained 265 housing units.

Historical population
| Census | Pop. | Note | %± |
|---|---|---|---|
| 1890 | 842 | | — |
| 1900 | 913 | | 8.4% |
| 1910 | 871 | | −4.6% |
| 1920 | 670 | | −23.1% |
| 1930 | 647 | | −3.4% |
| 1940 | 606 | | −6.3% |
| 1950 | 672 | | 10.9% |
| 1960 | 579 | | −13.8% |
| 1970 | 596 | | 2.9% |
| 1980 | 725 | | 21.6% |
| 1990 | 650 | | −10.3% |
| 2000 | 657 | | 1.1% |
| 2010 | 628 | | −4.4% |
| 2020 | 590 | | −6.1% |
Source: US Decennial Census

== History ==
Harrison Township was organized in 1841, and named for William Henry Harrison (1773–1841), the ninth President of the United States (1841).

== Geography ==
According to the 2010 census, the township has a total area of 31.6 square miles (82 km^{2}), of which 31.51 square miles (81.6 km^{2}) (or 99.72%) is land and 0.09 square miles (0.23 km^{2}) (or 0.28%) is water.

=== Adjacent townships ===
- Tippecanoe Township (north)
- Aubbeenaubbee Township, Fulton County (northeast)
- Union Township, Fulton County (east)
- Wayne Township, Fulton County (southeast)
- Van Buren Township (south)
- Indian Creek Township (southwest)
- Monroe Township (west)

=== Major highways ===
- U.S. Route 35
- Indiana State Road 14

=== Lakes ===
- Bruce Lake

== Education ==
- Eastern Pulaski Community School Corporation

Harrison Township residents may obtain a free library card from the Pulaski County Public Library in Winamac.

== Political districts ==
- Indiana's 2nd congressional district
- State House District 20
- State Senate District 18
