= Pulaski, Indiana =

- Unincorporated community and Census-designated place
- Location within Indiana Location within the United States
- Coordinates: 40°58′40″N 86°39′13″W
- Country: United States
- State: Indiana
- County: Pulaski
- Township: Indian Creek
- Elevation: 686 ft (209 m)
- Time zone: UTC-5 (Eastern (EST))
  - Summer (DST): UTC-4 (EDT)
- ZIP code: 46996
- GNIS feature ID: 2830505

Pulaski is an unincorporated community located in Pulaski County, Indiana.

== History ==
Pulaski was laid out in 1855 soon after a gristmill has been built at that point. The community took its name from Pulaski County. A post office was established at Pulaski in 1852, and remained in operation until it was discontinued in 1927.

== Demographics ==
The United States Census Bureau defined Pulaski as a census designated place in the 2022 American Community Survey.
