= Salem Township, Pulaski County, Indiana =

Salem Township
- Township
- Location in Pulaski County
- Coordinates: 40°57′26″N 86°52′32″W
- Country: United States
- State: Indiana
- County: Pulaski

Government
  - Type: Indiana township

Area
  - Total: 35.79 sq mi (92.7 km^{2})
  - Land: 35.79 sq mi (92.7 km^{2})
  - Water: 0 sq mi (0 km^{2}) 0%
- Elevation: 673 ft (205 m)

Population (2020)
  - Total: 1,266
  - Density: 35.37/sq mi (13.66/km^{2})
- ZIP code: 47946
- GNIS feature ID: 453824

Salem Township is one of twelve townships in Pulaski County, Indiana, United States. As of the 2020 census, its population was 1,266, and it contained 562 housing units.

Salem Township was organized in 1843, and most likely was named after Salem Township, Champaign County, Ohio, the native home of a first settler.

Historical population
Census	Pop.	Note	%±
1890	1,000		—
1900	1,207		20.7%
1910	1,362		12.8%
1920	1,258		−7.6%
1930	1,262		0.3%
1940	1,387		9.9%
1950	1,385		−0.1%
1960	1,462		5.6%
1970	1,427		−2.4%
1980	1,459		2.2%
1990	1,429		−2.1%
2000	1,500		5.0%
2010	1,399		−6.7%
2020	1,266		−9.5%
Source: US Decennial Census

== Geography ==
According to the 2010 census, the township has a total area of 35.79 square miles (92.7 km^{2}), all land.

=== Cities, towns, villages ===
- Francesville

=== Adjacent townships ===
- White Post Township (north)
- Jefferson Township (northeast)
- Beaver Township (east)
- Monon Township, White County (south)
- Hanging Grove Township, Jasper County (west)
- Gillam Township, Jasper County (northwest)

=== Cemeteries ===
The township contains these two cemeteries: Nauvoo and Roseland.

=== Major highways ===
- U.S. Route 421
- Indiana State Road 114

=== Airports and landing strips ===
- Calvert Air Park

== Education ==
- West Central School Corporation

Salem Township is served by the Francesville-Salem Township Public Library in Francesville.

== Political districts ==
- Indiana's 2nd congressional district
- State House District 16
- State Senate District 18
