= Sitka, Indiana =

- Unincorporated community
- Location within Indiana Location within the United States
- Coordinates: 40°49′32″N 86°44′07″W
- Country: United States
- State: Indiana
- County: White
- Township: Liberty
- Elevation: 686 ft (209 m)
- Time zone: UTC-5 (Eastern (EST))
  - Summer (DST): UTC-4 (EDT)
- ZIP code: 47960
- GNIS feature ID: 443556

Sitka is an unincorporated community in Liberty Township, White County, in the U.S. state of Indiana. As a small rural community, it is primarily associated with Sitka Baptist Church, which lies at its central intersection.

== History ==
A post office was established at Sitka in 1877, and remained in operation until it was discontinued in 1903. A small general store was opened soon after the post office. The community most likely was named after Sitka, Alaska.

== Geography ==
Sitka is located at 40°49′32″N 86°44′07″W.
