= Beaver Township =

Beaver Township may refer to:

== Arkansas ==
- Beaver Township, Carroll County, Arkansas
- Beaver Township, Saline County, Arkansas

== Illinois ==
- Beaver Township, Iroquois County, Illinois

== Indiana ==
- Beaver Township, Newton County, Indiana
- Beaver Township, Pulaski County, Indiana

== Iowa ==
- Beaver Township, Boone County, Iowa
- Beaver Township, Butler County, Iowa
- Beaver Township, Dallas County, Iowa
- Beaver Township, Grundy County, Iowa
- Beaver Township, Guthrie County, Iowa
- Beaver Township, Humboldt County, Iowa
- Beaver Township, Polk County, Iowa

== Kansas ==
- Beaver Township, Barton County, Kansas
- Beaver Township, Cowley County, Kansas
- Beaver Township, Decatur County, Kansas
- Beaver Township, Lincoln County, Kansas, in Lincoln County, Kansas
- Beaver Township, Phillips County, Kansas, in Phillips County, Kansas
- Beaver Township, Republic County, Kansas
- Beaver Township, Scott County, Kansas, in Scott County, Kansas
- Beaver Township, Smith County, Kansas, in Smith County, Kansas

== Michigan ==
- Beaver Township, Bay County, Michigan
- Beaver Township, Newaygo County, Michigan

== Minnesota ==
- Beaver Township, Aitkin County, Minnesota
- Beaver Township, Fillmore County, Minnesota
- Beaver Township, Roseau County, Minnesota

== Missouri ==
- Beaver Township, Taney County, Missouri

== Nebraska ==
- Beaver Township, Buffalo County, Nebraska
- Beaver Township, Nance County, Nebraska

== North Dakota ==
- Beaver Township, Benson County, North Dakota

== Ohio ==
- Beaver Township, Mahoning County, Ohio
- Beaver Township, Noble County, Ohio
- Beaver Township, Pike County, Ohio

== Pennsylvania ==
- Beaver Township, Clarion County, Pennsylvania
- Beaver Township, Columbia County, Pennsylvania
- Beaver Township, Crawford County, Pennsylvania
- Beaver Township, Jefferson County, Pennsylvania
- Beaver Township, Snyder County, Pennsylvania

== South Dakota ==
- Beaver Township, Miner County, South Dakota, in Miner County, South Dakota
