= Denham, Indiana =

- Unincorporated community
- Location within Indiana Location within the United States
- Coordinates: 41°09′07″N 86°42′49″W
- Country: United States
- State: Indiana
- County: Pulaski
- Township: Rich Grove
- Elevation: 709 ft (216 m)
- Time zone: UTC-5 (Eastern (EST))
  - Summer (DST): UTC-4 (EDT)
- ZIP code: 46996
- GNIS feature ID: 433469

Denham is an unincorporated community in Rich Grove Township, Pulaski County, in the U.S. state of Indiana.

== History ==
An old variant name of the community was called Gundrum. The community had its start in 1860s when the railroad was extended to that point. The Denham name was adopted in the 1880s in honor of a railroad official.

A post office was established under the name Gundrum in 1870, was renamed Denham in 1888, and remained in operation until it was discontinued in 1996.
