= Rich Grove Township, Pulaski County, Indiana =

Rich Grove Township
- Township
- Location in Pulaski County
- Coordinates: 41°07′41″N 86°45′24″W
- Country: United States
- State: Indiana
- County: Pulaski

Government
  - Type: Indiana township

Area
  - Total: 36.22 sq mi (93.8 km^{2})
  - Land: 36.22 sq mi (93.8 km^{2})
  - Water: 0 sq mi (0 km^{2}) 0%
- Elevation: 686 ft (209 m)

Population (2020)
  - Total: 858
  - Density: 23.7/sq mi (9.15/km^{2})
- ZIP codes: 46366, 46996, 47957
- GNIS feature ID: 453788

Rich Grove Township is one of twelve townships in Pulaski County, Indiana, United States. As of the 2020 census, its population was 858 and it contained 353 housing units.

Rich Grove Township was organized in 1854.

Historical population
Census	Pop.	Note	%±
1890	521		—
1900	689		32.2%
1910	747		8.4%
1920	738		−1.2%
1930	662		−10.3%
1940	717		8.3%
1950	866		20.8%
1960	834		−3.7%
1970	852		2.2%
1980	811		−4.8%
1990	722		−11.0%
2000	887		22.9%
2010	921		3.8%
2020	858		−6.8%
Source: US Decennial Census

== Geography ==
According to the 2010 census, the township has a total area of 36.22 square miles (93.8 km^{2}), all land.

=== Unincorporated towns ===
- Denham at 41.151985°N 86.713625°W

(This list is based on USGS data and may include former settlements.)

=== Adjacent townships ===
- Wayne Township, Starke County (north)
- California Township, Starke County (northeast)
- Franklin Township (east)
- Monroe Township (southeast)
- Jefferson Township (south)
- White Post Township (southwest)
- Cass Township (west)
- Railroad Township, Starke County (northwest)

=== Major highways ===
- Indiana State Road 39

== Education ==
- North Judson-San Pierre School Corporation

Rich Grove Township residents may obtain a free library card from the Pulaski County Public Library in Winamac.

== Political districts ==
- Indiana's 2nd congressional district
- State House District 20
- State Senate District 5
