= Pulaski County, Indiana =

County of Indiana, United States

- County
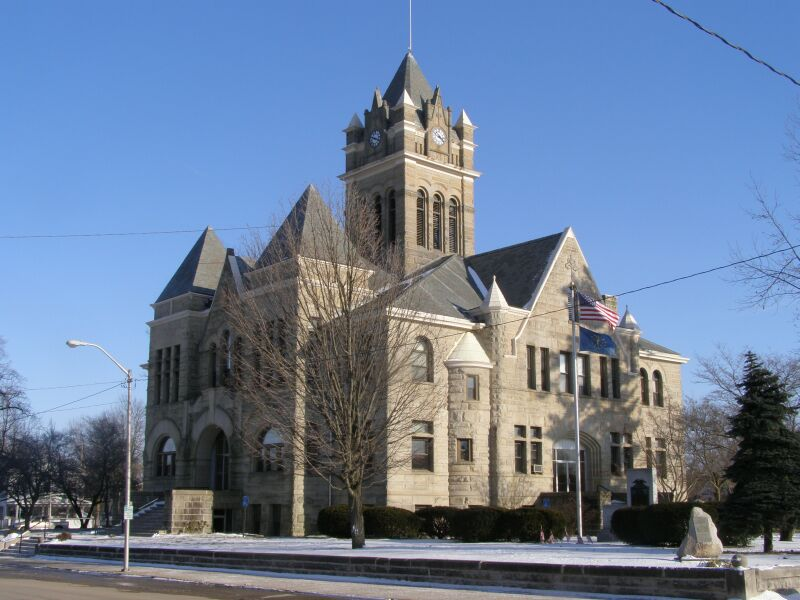
- Pulaski County Courthouse in Winamac

- Shield

- Location in the state of Indiana

- Indiana's location in the U.S.
- Coordinates: 41°02′N 86°41′W
- Country: United States
- State: Indiana
- Established: February 7, 1835
- Named for: Count Casimir Pulaski
- County seat: Winamac
- Largest town: Winamac (population and total area)
- Incorporated Municipalities: Four towns: Francesville; Medaryville; Monterey; Winamac

Government
  - Type: County
  - Body: Board of Commissioners
  - Commissioner: Donald "Don" Street, Jr., President, District 2
  - Commissioner: John M. "Mike" McClure, Vice-President, District 3
  - Commissioner: Jennifer "Jenny" Knebel, District 1

Area
  - Total: 434.53 sq mi (1,125.4 km^{2})
  - Land: 433.65 sq mi (1,123.1 km^{2})
  - Water: 0.88 sq mi (2.3 km^{2})
  - Rank: 25th largest county in Indiana
- Elevation: 705 ft (215 m)

Population (2020)
  - Total: 12,514
  - Estimate (2025): 12,463 ▼
  - Rank: 83rd largest county in Indiana
  - Density: 28.857/sq mi (11.142/km^{2})
- Time zone: UTC-5 (Eastern)
  - Summer (DST): UTC-4 (Eastern)
- ZIP Codes: 46366, 46374, 46511, 46939, 46960, 46978, 46985, 46996, 47946, 47957, 47959-60
- Area code: 574
- Congressional district: 2nd
- Indiana Senate districts: 5th and 18th
- Indiana House of Representatives districts: 16th and 20th
- FIPS code: 18-131
- GNIS feature ID: 0446852
- U.S. and State Routes: link = U.S. Route 35 link = U.S. Route 421 link = Indiana State Road 14 link = Indiana State Road 39 link = Indiana State Road 114 link = Indiana State Road 119 link = Indiana State Road 143
- Airport: Arens Field
- Waterway: Tippecanoe River
- Website: www.pulaskionline.org
- Indiana county number 66

Pulaski County (/pʊˈlæskaɪ/ pə-LAS-ky (Note: This pronunciation is derived from the following: Kazimierz Michał Władysław Wiktor Pułaski of Ślepowron (Polish pronunciation: [kaˈʑimjɛʂ puˈwaskʲi]; Casimir Pulaski /ˈkæ.zɪ.ˌmɪər pəˈlæ.skiː/)) is a county located in the U.S. state of Indiana. According to the 2020 U.S. census, the population was 12,514. The county seat is Winamac.

== History ==
Pulaski County was organized in 1839.

== Geography ==
According to the 2010 census, the county has a total area of 434.53 square miles (1,125.4 km^{2}), of which 433.65 square miles (1,123.1 km^{2}) (or 99.80%) is land and 0.88 square miles (2.3 km^{2}) (or 0.20%) is water.

=== Major highways ===
- U.S. Route 35
- U.S. Route 421
- Indiana State Road 14
- Indiana State Road 39
- Indiana State Road 114
- Indiana State Road 119
- Indiana State Road 143

=== Railroads ===
- CSX Transportation

=== Adjacent counties ===
- Starke County (north)
- Marshall County (northeast)
- Fulton County (east)
- Cass County (southeast)
- White County (south)
- Jasper County (west)

== Municipalities ==
=== Towns ===
The municipalities in Pulaski County, and their populations as of the 2010 Census, are:

- Francesville – 879
- Medaryville – 614
- Monterey – 218
- Winamac – 2,490

=== Census-designated places ===
- Star City – 377

=== Other unincorporated places ===
- Beardstown
- Denham
- Lawton
- Pulaski
- Radioville
- Ripley
- Thornhope
- Vanmeter Park

== Townships ==
The 12 townships of Pulaski County, with their populations as of the 2010 Census, are:

- Beaver – 516
- Cass – 878
- Franklin – 715
- Harrison – 628
- Indian Creek – 691
- Jefferson – 545
- Monroe – 4,019
- Rich Grove – 921
- Salem – 1,399
- Tippecanoe – 1,104
- Van Buren – 911
- White Post – 1,075

== Education ==
Public schools in Pulaski County are administered by four districts:

- Eastern Pulaski Community Schools
- West Central School Corporation
- Culver Community Schools
- North Judson-San Pierre Schools

High Schools

- Winamac Community High School
- West Central High School

Middle Schools

- Winamac Community Middle School
- West Central Middle School

Elementary Schools

- Eastern Pulaski Elementary School
- West Central Elementary School

== Hospitals ==
- Pulaski Memorial Hospital, Winamac – 25 beds

== Climate and weather ==
Winamac, Indiana

Climate chart (precipitation, max. and min. temperature)
J	F	M	A	M	J	J	A	S	O	N	D
1.9 31 14	1.7 36 18	2.7 47 28	3.5 60 38	3.8 72 50	4.1 80 59	3.9 84 63	3.9 82 61	3.3 75 53	2.9 64 42	3.1 49 31	2.6 36 20
- █ Average max. and min. temperatures in °F
- █ Precipitation totals in inches
- Source: The Weather Channel
Metric conversion
J	F	M	A	M	J	J	A	S	O	N	D
49 −1 −10	43 2 −8	70 8 −2	89 16 3	97 22 10	104 27 15	99 29 17	98 28 16	83 24 12	75 18 6	78 9 −1	66 2 −7
- █ Average max. and min. temperatures in °C
- █ Precipitation totals in mm

In recent years, average temperatures in Winamac have ranged from a low of 14 °F (−10 °C) in January to a high of 84 °F (29 °C) in July, although a record low of −29 °F (−34 °C) was recorded in January 1985 and a record high of 102 °F (39 °C) was recorded in June 1988. Average monthly precipitation ranged from 1.68 inches (43 mm) in February to 4.09 inches (104 mm) in June.

== Government ==
The county government is a constitutional body, and is granted specific powers by the Constitution of Indiana, and by the Indiana Code.

County Council: The county council is the fiscal-legislative branch of the county government and controls all the spending and revenue collection in the county. Four members are elected from county districts, and three are elected at-large. The council members serve four-year terms. They are responsible for setting salaries, the annual budget, and special spending. The council also has limited authority to impose local taxes, in the form of an income and property tax that is subject to state level approval, excise taxes, and service taxes.

Board of Commissioners: The executive-legislative body of the county is the board of commissioners. The commissioners represent geographic districts, but are elected county-wide, in staggered terms, and each serves a four-year term. One of the commissioners, typically the most senior, serves as president. The commissioners are charged with adopting and executing legislation, collecting revenue, and managing the day-to-day functions of the county government.

Court: The county maintains a small claims court that can handle some civil cases. The judge on the court is elected to a term of four years and must be a member of the Indiana Bar Association. In some cases, court decisions can be appealed to the state level circuit court.

County Officials: The county has several other elected offices, including sheriff, coroner, auditor, treasurer, recorder, surveyor, and circuit court clerk Each of these elected officers serves a term of four years and oversees a different part of county government. Members elected to county government positions are required to declare party affiliations and to be residents of the county.

Pulaski County is part of Indiana's 2nd congressional district and in 2025 was represented by Rudy Yakym in the United States Congress.

United States presidential election results for Pulaski County, Indiana
Year	Republican		Democratic		Third party(ies)	
Year	No.	%	No.	%	No.	%
1888	1,223	44.95%	1,446	53.14%	52	1.91%
1892	986	36.80%	1,352	50.47%	341	12.73%
1896	1,345	39.97%	1,964	58.37%	56	1.66%
1900	1,501	42.53%	1,909	54.09%	119	3.37%
1904	1,729	48.61%	1,648	46.33%	180	5.06%
1908	1,561	44.31%	1,832	52.00%	130	3.69%
1912	729	24.83%	1,250	42.57%	957	32.60%
1916	1,474	46.79%	1,387	44.03%	289	9.17%
1920	2,740	53.88%	2,228	43.82%	117	2.30%
1924	2,725	55.03%	1,953	39.44%	274	5.53%
1928	2,738	56.43%	2,040	42.04%	74	1.53%
1932	2,226	39.46%	3,286	58.25%	129	2.29%
1936	2,780	45.42%	3,274	53.50%	66	1.08%
1940	3,472	52.70%	3,021	45.86%	95	1.44%
1944	3,206	55.03%	2,509	43.07%	111	1.91%
1948	3,039	50.72%	2,736	45.66%	217	3.62%
1952	4,030	63.10%	2,244	35.13%	113	1.77%
1956	4,117	62.07%	2,424	36.54%	92	1.39%
1960	3,905	57.67%	2,746	40.56%	120	1.77%
1964	3,202	48.27%	3,408	51.37%	24	0.36%
1968	3,361	54.80%	2,071	33.77%	701	11.43%
1972	4,243	69.04%	1,863	30.31%	40	0.65%
1976	3,586	54.21%	2,813	42.52%	216	3.27%
1980	3,916	62.06%	2,092	33.15%	302	4.79%
1984	4,167	66.93%	2,008	32.25%	51	0.82%
1988	3,677	62.14%	2,213	37.40%	27	0.46%
1992	2,712	45.84%	1,950	32.96%	1,254	21.20%
1996	2,693	49.95%	2,010	37.28%	688	12.76%
2000	3,497	63.37%	1,919	34.78%	102	1.85%
2004	3,797	67.63%	1,750	31.17%	67	1.19%
2008	3,388	56.81%	2,466	41.35%	110	1.84%
2012	3,366	62.34%	1,899	35.17%	134	2.48%
2016	3,854	70.60%	1,327	24.31%	278	5.09%
2020	4,246	73.04%	1,463	25.17%	104	1.79%
2024	4,372	75.86%	1,280	22.21%	111	1.93%

== Demographics ==
Historical population
Census	Pop.	Note	%±
1840	561		—
1850	2,595		362.6%
1860	5,711		120.1%
1870	7,801		36.6%
1880	9,851		26.3%
1890	11,233		14.0%
1900	14,033		24.9%
1910	13,312		−5.1%
1920	12,385		−7.0%
1930	11,195		−9.6%
1940	12,056		7.7%
1950	12,493		3.6%
1960	12,837		2.8%
1970	12,534		−2.4%
1980	13,258		5.8%
1990	12,643		−4.6%
2000	13,755		8.8%
2010	13,402		−2.6%
2020	12,514		−6.6%
2025 (est.)	12,463	▼	−0.4%
U.S. Decennial Census; 1790-1960 1900-1990; 1990-2000 2010

=== Racial and ethnic composition ===
Pulaski County, Indiana – Racial and ethnic composition Note: the US Census treats Hispanic/Latino as an ethnic category. This table excludes Latinos from the racial categories and assigns them to a separate category. Hispanics/Latinos may be of any race.
Race / Ethnicity (NH = Non-Hispanic)	Pop 1980	Pop 1990	Pop 2000	Pop 2010	Pop 2020	% 1980	% 1990	% 2000	% 2010	% 2020
White alone (NH)	13,078	12,431	13,294	12,823	11,442	98.64%	98.32%	96.65%	95.68%	91.43%
Black or African American alone (NH)	57	65	126	87	65	0.43%	0.51%	0.92%	0.65%	0.52%
Native American or Alaska Native alone (NH)	2	21	29	38	24	0.02%	0.17%	0.21%	0.28%	0.19%
Asian alone (NH)	16	20	28	27	44	0.12%	0.16%	0.20%	0.20%	0.35%
Native Hawaiian or Pacific Islander alone (NH)	x	x	1	3	3	x	x	0.01%	0.02%	0.02%
Other race alone (NH)	15	0	4	0	14	0.11%	0.00%	0.03%	0.00%	0.11%
Mixed race or Multiracial (NH)	x	x	82	99	464	x	x	0.60%	0.74%	3.71%
Hispanic or Latino (any race)	90	106	191	325	458	0.68%	0.84%	1.39%	2.43%	3.66%
Total	13,258	12,643	13,755	13,402	12,514	100.00%	100.00%	100.00%	100.00%	100.00%

=== 2020 census ===
As of the 2020 census, the county had a population of 12,514. The median age was 44.4 years. 21.9% of residents were under the age of 18 and 21.0% of residents were 65 years of age or older. For every 100 females there were 103.8 males, and for every 100 females age 18 and over there were 100.7 males age 18 and over.

The racial makeup of the county was 92.7% White, 0.6% Black or African American, 0.3% American Indian and Alaska Native, 0.4% Asian, <0.1% Native Hawaiian and Pacific Islander, 1.0% from some other race, and 5.0% from two or more races. Hispanic or Latino residents of any race comprised 3.7% of the population.

<0.1% of residents lived in urban areas, while 100.0% lived in rural areas.

There were 5,100 households in the county, of which 29.1% had children under the age of 18 living in them. Of all households, 50.4% were married-couple households, 20.1% were households with a male householder and no spouse or partner present, and 22.1% were households with a female householder and no spouse or partner present. About 27.6% of all households were made up of individuals and 13.3% had someone living alone who was 65 years of age or older.

There were 5,816 housing units, of which 12.3% were vacant. Among occupied housing units, 78.7% were owner-occupied and 21.3% were renter-occupied. The homeowner vacancy rate was 1.6% and the rental vacancy rate was 8.0%.

=== 2010 census ===
As of the 2010 United States census, there were 13,402 people, 5,282 households, and 3,707 families residing in the county. The population density was 30.9 inhabitants per square mile (11.9/km^{2}). There were 6,060 housing units at an average density of 14.0 per square mile (5.4/km^{2}). The racial makeup of the county was 97.2% white, 0.7% black or African American, 0.3% American Indian, 0.2% Asian, 0.6% from other races, and 1.0% from two or more races. Those of Hispanic or Latino origin made up 2.4% of the population. In terms of ancestry, 32.4% were German, 12.2% were Irish, 8.6% were English, and 8.2% were American.

Of the 5,282 households, 31.5% had children under the age of 18 living with them, 55.6% were married couples living together, 9.0% had a female householder with no husband present, 29.8% were non-families, and 25.6% of all households were made up of individuals. The average household size was 2.50 and the average family size was 2.97. The median age was 41.7 years.

The median income for a household in the county was $47,697 and the median income for a family was $50,903. Males had a median income of $43,624 versus $27,131 for females. The per capita income for the county was $20,491. About 13.4% of families and 17.2% of the population were below the poverty line, including 28.5% of those under age 18 and 8.3% of those age 65 or over.

== See also ==
- National Register of Historic Places listings in Pulaski County, Indiana
- Tippecanoe River State Park
- Mammoth Solar, a 1.6 GW ground-based solar power generator
