= Jefferson Township, Pulaski County, Indiana =

Jefferson Township
- Township
- Location in Pulaski County
- Coordinates: 41°02′35″N 86°45′44″W
- Country: United States
- State: Indiana
- County: Pulaski

Government
  - Type: Indiana township

Area
  - Total: 36.4 sq mi (94 km^{2})
  - Land: 36.4 sq mi (94 km^{2})
  - Water: 0 sq mi (0 km^{2}) 0%
- Elevation: 696 ft (212 m)

Population (2020)
  - Total: 490
  - Density: 13/sq mi (5.2/km^{2})
- ZIP codes: 46996, 47946, 47957
- GNIS feature ID: 453496

Jefferson Township is one of twelve townships in Pulaski County, Indiana, United States. As of the 2020 census, its population was 490 and it contained 228 housing units.

Jefferson Township was organized in 1851, and named after Thomas Jefferson, third President of the United States.

Historical population
Census	Pop.	Note	%±
1890	475		—
1900	847		78.3%
1910	669		−21.0%
1920	583		−12.9%
1930	471		−19.2%
1940	583		23.8%
1950	535		−8.2%
1960	560		4.7%
1970	491		−12.3%
1980	482		−1.8%
1990	414		−14.1%
2000	546		31.9%
2010	545		−0.2%
2020	490		−10.1%
Source: US Decennial Census

== Geography ==
According to the 2010 census, the township has a total area of 36.4 square miles (94 km^{2}), all land.

=== Adjacent townships ===
- Rich Grove Township (north)
- Franklin Township (northeast)
- Monroe Township (east)
- Indian Creek Township (southeast)
- Beaver Township (south)
- Salem Township (southwest)
- White Post Township (west)
- Cass Township (northwest)

=== Cemeteries ===
The township contains these three cemeteries: Burroughs, Idle and Koster.

=== Major highways ===
- Indiana State Road 14
- Indiana State Road 39

== Education ==
- Eastern Pulaski Community School Corporation
- West Central School Corporation

Jefferson Township residents may obtain a free library card from the Pulaski County Public Library in Winamac.

== Political districts ==
- Indiana's 2nd congressional district
- State House District 20
- State Senate District 18
