= Pulaski County Home =

- U.S. National Register of Historic Places
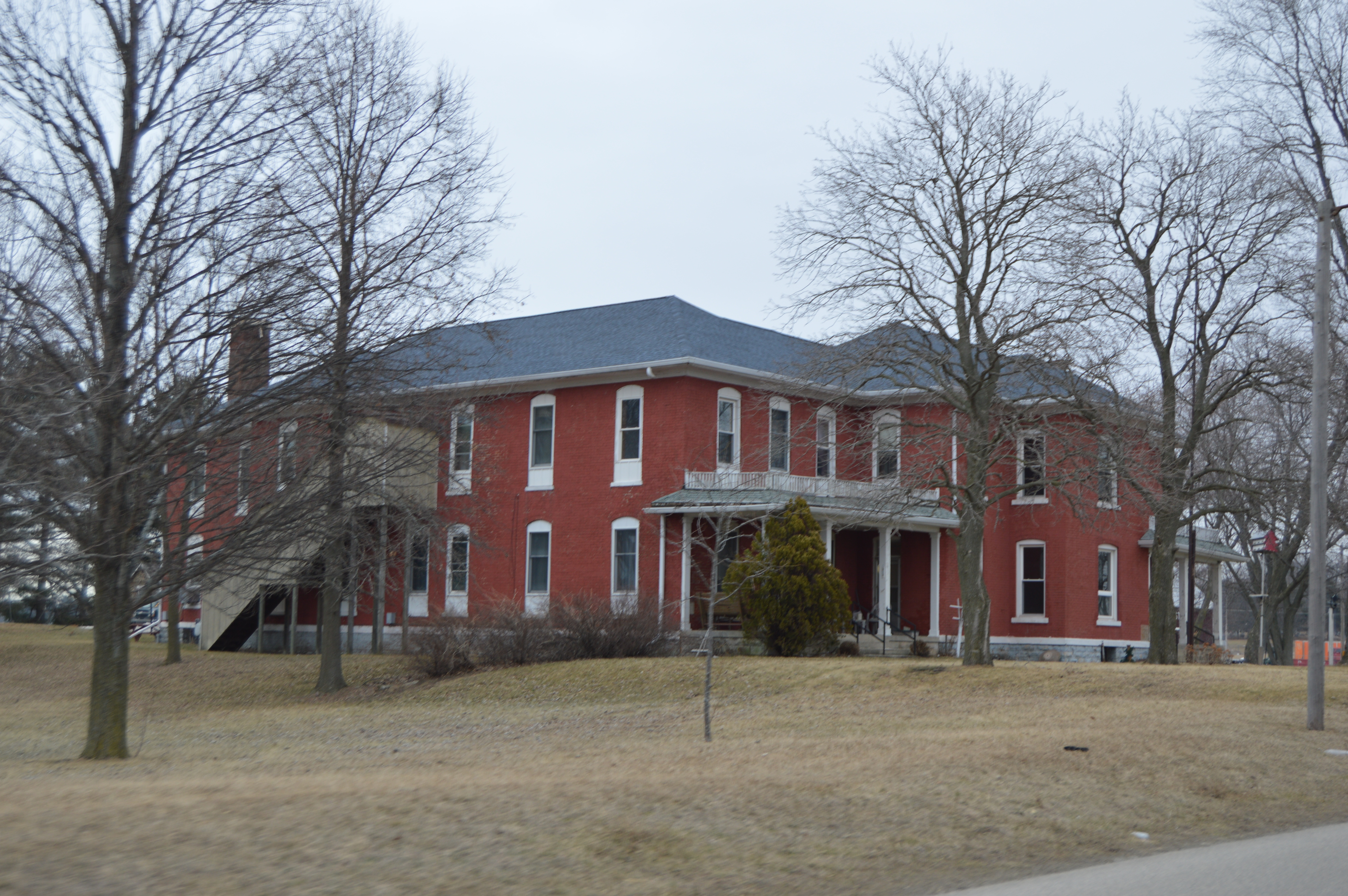
- Pulaski County Home, March 2015

- Location within Indiana Location within the United States
- Location: 700 W. 60 S., Monroe Township, Pulaski County, Indiana
- Coordinates: 41°2′46″N 86°37′00″W
- Area: 6 acres (2.4 ha)
- Built: 1881, 1882, 1897, 1929
- Architect: Crain, Joseph E.; Hathaway, Owen W.
- Architectural style: Italianate
- NRHP reference No.: 15000079
- Added to NRHP: March 17, 2015

Pulaski County Home, also known as Pleasant View Rest Home, is a historic poor farm located in Monroe Township, Pulaski County, Indiana. The original section was built in 1881, and expanded with two wings in 1897. It is a large, four-story, Italianate style red brick building. It has a low-pitched, multiple hip and valley roof and features multiple porches, stoops, and access points. Also on the property are the contributing Pest House (1882), post and beam barn (1929), and milk house. It is one of Indiana's few county homes still in active service.

It was listed on the National Register of Historic Places in 2015.
