= Monon, Indiana =

- Town
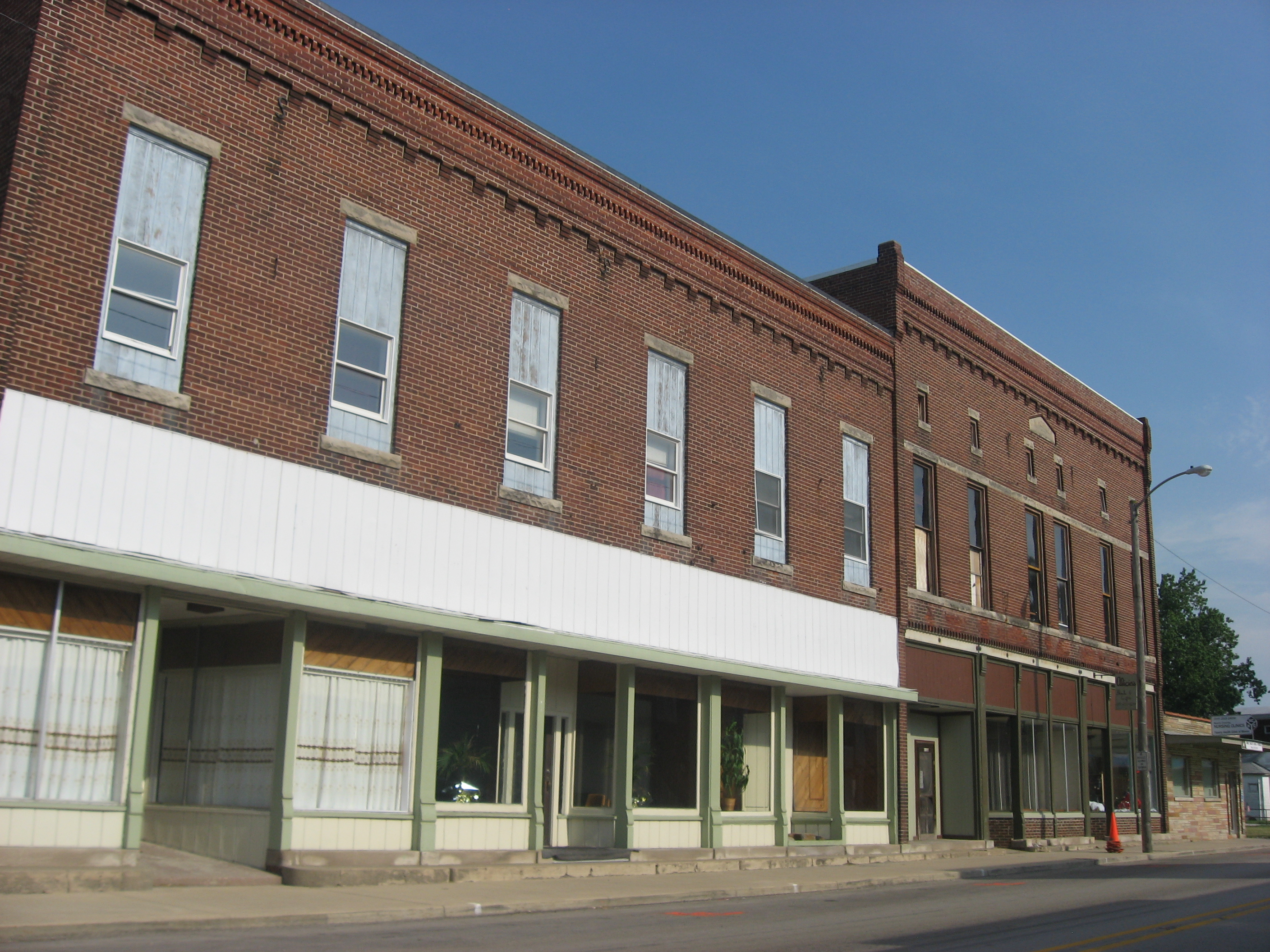
- The Monon Commercial Historic District on Route 421 is listed on the National Register of Historic Places.

- Logo

- Location of Monon in White County, Indiana.
- Coordinates: 40°51′49″N 86°52′23″W
- Country: United States
- State: Indiana
- County: White
- Township: Monon

Area
  - Total: 0.88 sq mi (2.29 km^{2})
  - Land: 0.88 sq mi (2.29 km^{2})
  - Water: 0 sq mi (0.00 km^{2})
- Elevation: 679 ft (207 m)

Population (2020)
  - Total: 1,919
  - Density: 2,167.8/sq mi (836.99/km^{2})
- Time zone: UTC-5 (EST)
  - Summer (DST): UTC-4 (EDT)
- ZIP code: 47959
- Area code: 219
- FIPS code: 18-50148
- GNIS feature ID: 2396770
- Website: townofmonon.com

Monon is a town in Monon Township, White County, in the U.S. state of Indiana. The population was 1,919 at the 2020 census.

== History ==
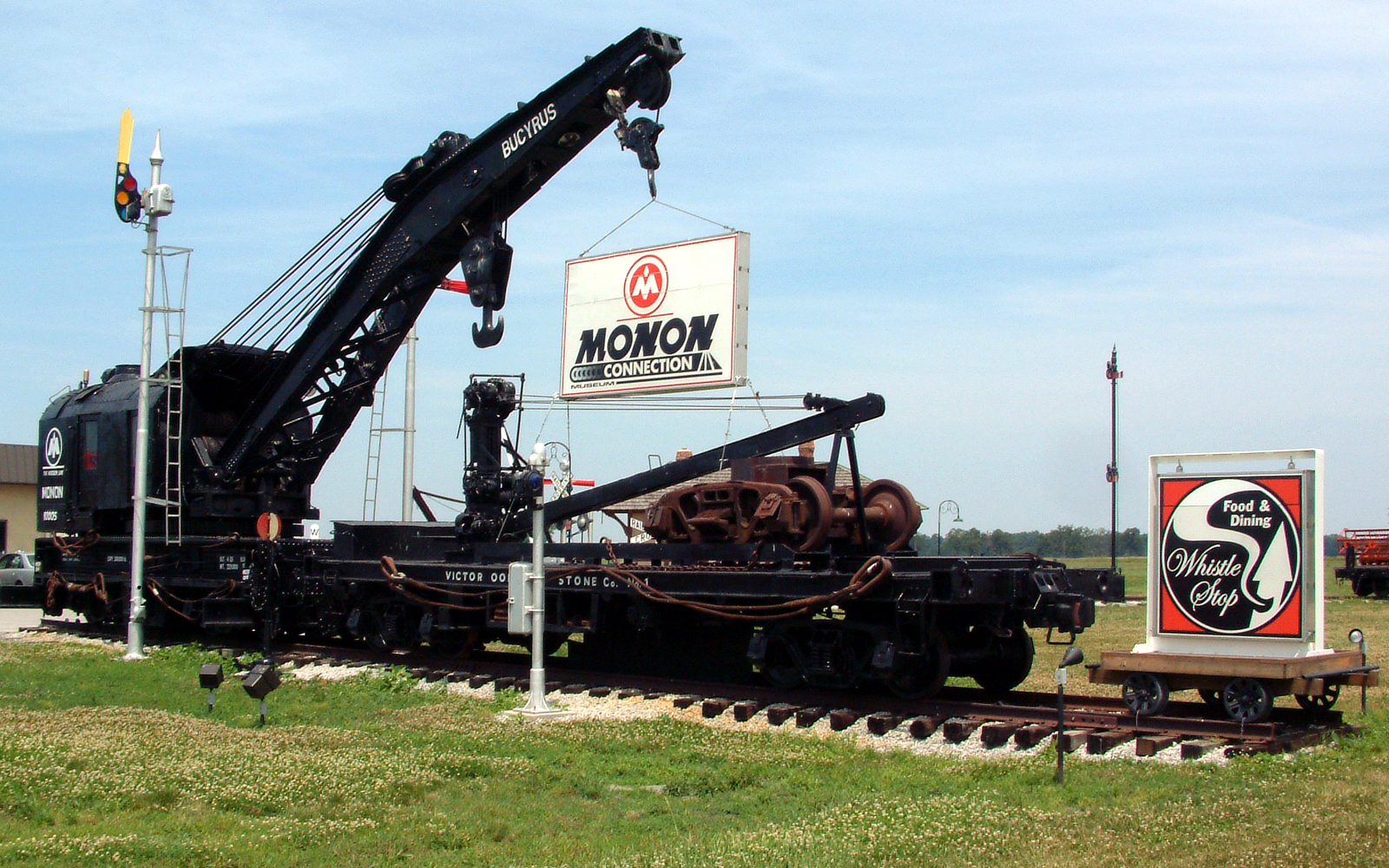
The Monon Connection Museum north of the town.

The town of Monon was platted by James Brooks in 1853 as "New Bradford". This act by the president of the New Albany and Salem Railroad (predecessor of the Monon Railroad) foretold the story of the town. The town would grow as the train company prospered, but once "The Monon" declined, so would the town's economy.

The town's name is derived from the names of two creeks nearby, the Big Monon and the Little Monon. The spelling of the name of the creeks was formerly Monong, a Potawatomi word which one authority says meant "swift-running". In the 1840s, the town's name was used as a nickname for the railroad company, and in 1856 the company formally adopted it as its corporate name. The first post office was established in 1838 under the name Monon, and when the town was incorporated in 1879, it legally adopted the post office's name as the town's name.

The town of Monon is situated on an important junction of different branches of the Monon lines. The northern division came into Monon and turned ninety degrees heading south to Lafayette and Louisville, Kentucky. Another line comes from Indianapolis and turned east. Another line headed north to Michigan City.

In its heyday, the Monon Railroad had two train yards in Monon. The main yard was 11 tracks wide with a capacity for 270 cars. The South Yard was narrower, 5 tracks wide, but longer and had a 278-car capacity.

There are no longer passenger train services, as has the line to Indianapolis and most of the line to Michigan City was closed. The only trains through Monon now are a CSX Transportation line from Maynard, Indiana to Lafayette and another on a portion of the old Michigan City line.

The Monon post office has been in operation since 1849.

North White High School Vikings football coach Jim Davis led the Vikings to a 14–0 season and class 1A football state championship in 1994 by defeating Sheridan High School 34–7 at the RCA Dome in Indianapolis. The Vikings were class 1A football state runner-up in 1998 under Davis.

Through the efforts of the Monon Civic Preservation Society the Monon Commercial Historic District was listed on the National Register of Historic Places in 2000. The Society maintains the historic Civic Center (originally the Arlington Hotel), the Monon Theater, and the Monon Railroad Caboose Memorial Park.

== Geography ==
Monon is located on U.S. Route 421, about 30 miles (48 km) north of Lafayette. According to the 2010 census, Monon has a total area of 0.56 square miles (1.45 km^{2}), all land.

== Demographics ==
Historical population
Census	Pop.	Note	%±
1880	288		—
1890	1,064		269.4%
1900	1,160		9.0%
1910	1,184		2.1%
1920	1,357		14.6%
1930	1,374		1.3%
1940	1,262		−8.2%
1950	1,439		14.0%
1960	1,417		−1.5%
1970	1,548		9.2%
1980	1,540		−0.5%
1990	1,585		2.9%
2000	1,733		9.3%
2010	1,777		2.5%
2020	1,919		8.0%
U.S. Decennial Census

=== 2020 census ===
As of the 2020 census, Monon had a population of 1,919. The median age was 29.8 years. 33.6% of residents were under the age of 18 and 11.9% of residents were 65 years of age or older. For every 100 females there were 100.5 males, and for every 100 females age 18 and over there were 100.2 males age 18 and over.

0.0% of residents lived in urban areas, while 100.0% lived in rural areas.

There were 596 households in Monon, of which 44.0% had children under the age of 18 living in them. Of all households, 48.2% were married-couple households, 16.1% were households with a male householder and no spouse or partner present, and 26.8% were households with a female householder and no spouse or partner present. About 24.2% of all households were made up of individuals and 11.5% had someone living alone who was 65 years of age or older.

There were 669 housing units, of which 10.9% were vacant. The homeowner vacancy rate was 3.8% and the rental vacancy rate was 5.3%.

Racial composition as of the 2020 census
Race	Number	Percent
White	915	47.7%
Black or African American	10	0.5%
American Indian and Alaska Native	43	2.2%
Asian	0	0.0%
Native Hawaiian and Other Pacific Islander	0	0.0%
Some other race	617	32.2%
Two or more races	334	17.4%
Hispanic or Latino (of any race)	1,068	55.7%

=== 2010 census ===
As of the census of 2010, there were 1,777 people, 600 households, and 420 families residing in the town. The population density was 3,173.2 inhabitants per square mile (1,225.2/km^{2}). There were 682 housing units at an average density of 1,217.9 per square mile (470.2/km^{2}). The racial makeup of the town was 77.2% White, 0.6% African American, 0.4% Native American, 0.2% Asian, 18.9% from other races, and 2.9% from two or more races. Hispanic or Latino of any race were 28.4% of the population (14.0% Salvadoran, 11.4% Mexican, 0.4% Honduran).

There were 600 households, of which 43.8% had children under the age of 18 living with them, 49.5% were married couples living together, 12.0% had a female householder with no husband present, 8.5% had a male householder with no wife present, and 30.0% were non-families. 25.3% of all households were made up of individuals, and 12.8% had someone living alone who was 65 years of age or older. The average household size was 2.96 and the average family size was 3.47.

The median age in the town was 31.8 years. 32.9% of residents were under the age of 18; 9.2% were between the ages of 18 and 24; 25.1% were from 25 to 44; 20.6% were from 45 to 64; and 12.3% were 65 years of age or older. The gender makeup of the town was 49.5% male and 50.5% female.

=== 2000 census ===
As of the census of 2000, there were 1,733 people, 642 households, and 437 families residing in the town. The population density was 3,083.9 inhabitants per square mile (1,190.7/km^{2}). There were 678 housing units at an average density of 1,206.5 per square mile (465.8/km^{2}). The racial makeup of the town was 84.54% White, 0.75% Native American, 0.23% Asian, 0.12% Pacific Islander, 12.46% from other races, and 1.90% from two or more races. Hispanic or Latino of any race were 17.25% of the population.

There were 642 households, out of which 32.7% had children under the age of 18 living with them, 50.9% were married couples living together, 12.1% had a female householder with no husband present, and 31.8% were non-families. 26.5% of all households were made up of individuals, and 14.6% had someone living alone who was 65 years of age or older. The average household size was 2.70 and the average family size was 3.15.

In the town, the population was spread out, with 26.9% under the age of 18, 11.3% from 18 to 24, 29.4% from 25 to 44, 19.0% from 45 to 64, and 13.4% who were 65 years of age or older. The median age was 32 years. For every 100 females, there were 96.0 males. For every 100 females age 18 and over, there were 93.9 males.

The median income for a household in the town was $32,235, and the median income for a family was $36,759. Males had a median income of $26,188 versus $20,405 for females. The per capita income for the town was $13,567. About 9.9% of families and 16.4% of the population were below the poverty line, including 27.7% of those under age 18 and 14.8% of those age 65 or over.

== Arts and culture ==
=== Monon Food Fest ===
The Monon Food Fest is held during the first Saturday in June every year. There is a large car show and a wide variety of vendors there with both food and items for sale. There is also live entertainment and pony rides.

== Education ==
The North White School Corporation (which also serves Buffalo and Reynolds) includes this municipality, and governs the three public schools in Monon: North White Primary, North White Intermediate, and North White Junior-Senior High School.

The North White High School Indiana Academic Super Bowl teams set a state record in 2009 by being the third in history to qualify all six teams for state and the first in history to get five state championships and a runner-up all in the same year. The next year, North White had another good run with three state finalists. Two of those finalists were champions and one was runner-up.

The town has a lending library, the Monon Town & Township Public Library.

== Transportation ==
Monon, which was historically a railway station that handled cargo and people through its network of rail lines across the state of Indiana, is now abandoned.

The town is located at the intersection of U.S. Highway 421 and state road 16. US 421 runs north to Michigan City and south to Indianapolis.
