= White County, Indiana =

County in Indiana, United States

- County
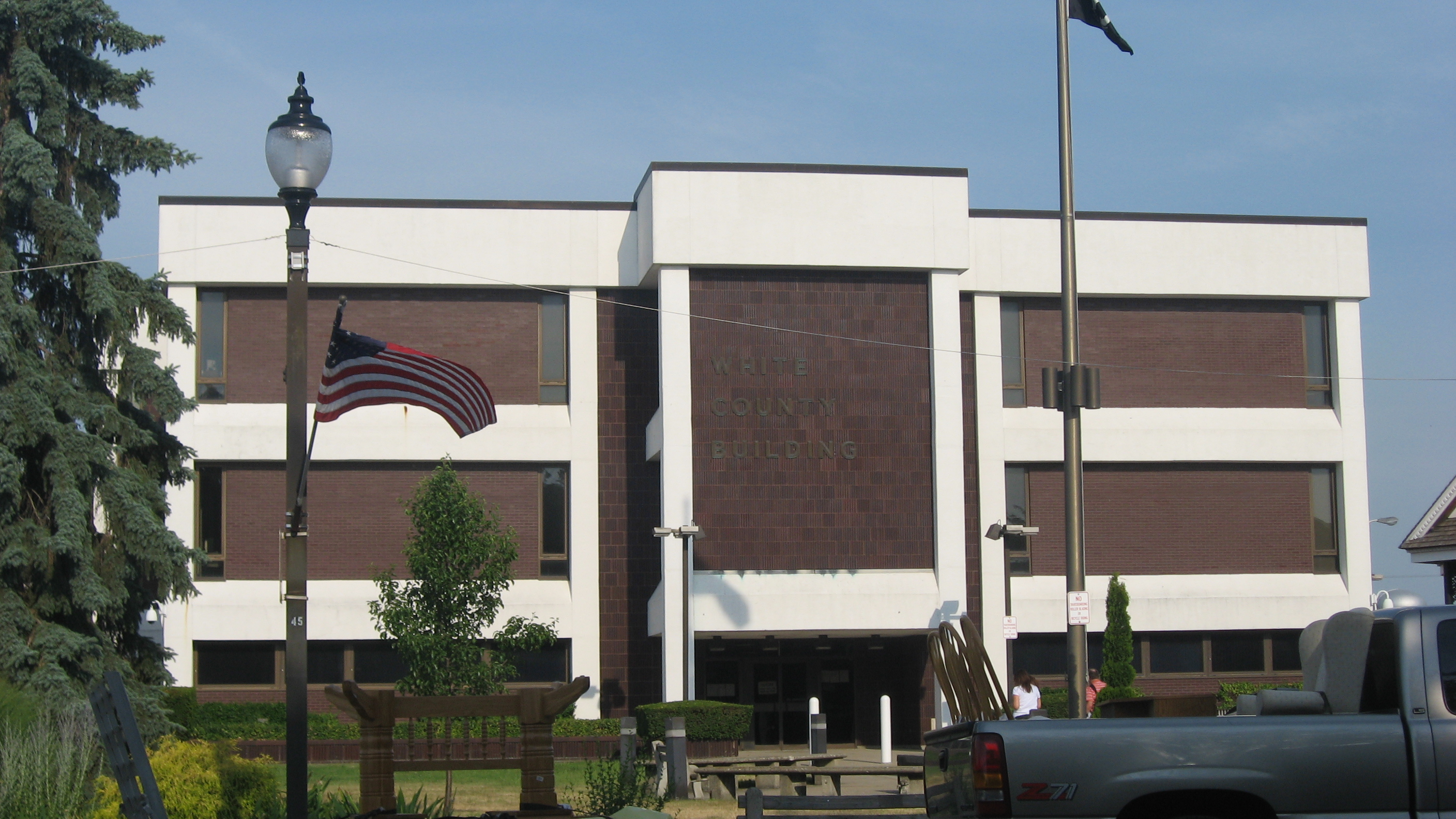
- White County Courthouse in Monticello

- Seal

- Location within the U.S. state of Indiana
- Coordinates: 40°45′N 86°52′W
- Country: United States
- State: Indiana
- Founded: February 1, 1834 (authorized)
- Named for: Isaac White
- Seat: Monticello
- Largest city: Monticello

Area
  - Total: 508.68 sq mi (1,317.5 km^{2})
  - Land: 505.12 sq mi (1,308.3 km^{2})
  - Water: 3.56 sq mi (9.2 km^{2}) 0.70%

Population (2020)
  - Total: 24,688
  - Estimate (2025): 25,164 ▲
  - Density: 48.876/sq mi (18.871/km^{2})
- Time zone: UTC−5 (Eastern)
  - Summer (DST): UTC−4 (EDT)
- Congressional district: 4th
- Website: Official website
- Indiana county number 91

White County is a county in the U.S. state of Indiana. As of the 2020 United States census, the population was 24,688. The county seat (and only incorporated city) is Monticello.

== History ==
The first white settlers in the future White County arrived in the land west of Tippecanoe River in 1829, and in other parts of the county in 1831. This area was part of Carroll County during that period.

By 1833, so many settlers had entered the area that the state legislature were pressured to have a separate county created. On February 1, 1834, the state approved the creation of this county, directing that it be named for Isaac White, a colonel in the Illinois militia. White was a mining geologist who was in charge of the salt works in Equality, Illinois, and was a close friend to Governor William Henry Harrison of the Northwest Territory, and to Joseph Hamilton Daveiss, U.S. District Attorney for Kentucky. In 1811, when Harrison declined the offer of Illinois troops to march on Tecumseh's village at Prophetstown, White enlisted as a private in the Indiana dragoons, which had been placed under the command of Daveiss. Both were killed at the Battle of Tippecanoe, and were buried in a common grave.

Interim commissioners were named and directed to organize the county during the summer of 1834, and to choose a county seat in September. They did so on September 5, 1834, naming Monticello as the future seat, due to its central location. While the county was being organized, it was attached to Carroll County for administrative and judicial purposes.

Alterations were made to the county's boundaries on December 24, 1834, on February 4, 1837, and on February 14, 1839. In addition, the counties of Jasper (1837), Pulaski (1839), Newton (1839), and Benton (1840) removed significant portions of the county's territory. The borders have remained unchanged since 1840.

== Geography ==
The low, rolling hills of White County are entirely devoted to agriculture or to urban development. The Tippecanoe River flows southward through the central part of the county. The highest point on the terrain (770 feet/230 meters ASL) is a gentle rise about 2.8 miles (4.5 km) SSE from Wolcott.

According to the 2010 United States census, the county has a total area of 508.68 square miles (1,317.5 km^{2}), of which 505.12 square miles (1,308.3 km^{2}) (or 99.30%) is land and 3.56 square miles (9.2 km^{2}) (or 0.70%) is water.

=== Adjacent counties ===
- Pulaski County - north
- Cass County - east
- Carroll County - southeast
- Tippecanoe County - south
- Benton County - west
- Jasper County - northwest/CST Border

=== City and towns ===
- Brookston (town)
- Burnettsville (town)
- Chalmers (town)
- Monon (town)
- Monticello (city/county seat)
- Reynolds (town)
- Wolcott (town)

=== Census-designated places ===
- Buffalo
- Idaville
- Norway

=== Unincorporated places ===
- Badger Grove
- Cedar Point
- East Monticello
- Golden Hill
- Guernsey
- Headlee
- Indiana Beach
- Lee
- Round Grove
- Seafield
- Sitka
- Smithson
- Springboro

=== Townships ===
- Big Creek
- Cass
- Honey Creek
- Jackson
- Liberty
- Lincoln
- Monon
- Prairie
- Princeton
- Round Grove
- Union
- West Point

=== Major highways ===
- Interstate 65
- U.S. Route 24
- U.S. Route 231
- U.S. Route 421
- Indiana State Road 16
- Indiana State Road 18
- Indiana State Road 39
- Indiana State Road 43
- Indiana State Road 119

=== Railroads ===
- CSX Transportation
- Toledo, Peoria and Western Railway

== Climate and weather ==
Monticello, Indiana

Climate chart (precipitation, max. and min. temperature)
J	F	M	A	M	J	J	A	S	O	N	D
2 33 17	1.9 39 21	2.9 51 31	3.5 64 40	3.9 74 50	4.1 83 60	4.2 86 63	4 84 61	2.9 78 53	2.7 66 42	3.1 51 33	2.7 38 23
- █ Average max. and min. temperatures in °F
- █ Precipitation totals in inches
- Source: The Weather Channel
Metric conversion
J	F	M	A	M	J	J	A	S	O	N	D
51 1 −8	49 4 −6	75 11 −1	88 18 4	99 23 10	103 28 16	106 30 17	101 29 16	75 26 12	69 19 6	79 11 1	68 3 −5
- █ Average max. and min. temperatures in °C
- █ Precipitation totals in mm

In recent years, average temperatures in Monticello have ranged from a low of 17 °F (−8 °C) in January to a high of 86 °F (30 °C) in July, although a record low of −25 °F (−32 °C) was recorded in January 1963 and a record high of 107 °F (42 °C) was recorded in July 1954. Average monthly precipitation ranged from 1.94 inches (49 mm) in February to 4.16 inches (106 mm) in July.

== Government ==
The county government is a constitutional body, and is granted specific powers by the Constitution of Indiana, and by the Indiana Code.

County Council: The legislative branch of the county government; controls spending and revenue collection in the county. Representatives are elected to four-year terms from county districts. They set salaries, the annual budget, and special spending. The council has limited authority to impose local taxes, in the form of an income and property tax that is subject to state level approval, excise taxes, and service taxes.

Board of Commissioners: The executive body of the county; commissioners are elected county-wide, to staggered four-year terms. One commissioner serves as president. The commissioners execute acts legislated by the council, collect revenue, and manage the county government.

Court: The county maintains a small claims court that handles civil cases. The judge on the court is elected to a term of four years and must be a member of the Indiana Bar Association. The judge is assisted by a constable who is also elected to a four-year term. In some cases, court decisions can be appealed to the state level circuit court.

County Officials: The county has other elected offices, including sheriff, coroner, auditor, treasurer, recorder, surveyor, and circuit court clerk. These officers are elected to four-year terms. Members elected to county government positions are required to declare party affiliations and to be residents of the county.

United States presidential election results for White County, Indiana
Year	Republican		Democratic		Third party(ies)	
Year	No.	%	No.	%	No.	%
1888	1,942	48.01%	2,017	49.86%	86	2.13%
1892	1,807	44.04%	1,896	46.21%	400	9.75%
1896	2,383	47.57%	2,537	50.65%	89	1.78%
1900	2,562	49.13%	2,510	48.13%	143	2.74%
1904	2,679	53.02%	2,096	41.48%	278	5.50%
1908	2,423	49.26%	2,326	47.29%	170	3.46%
1912	1,613	34.77%	2,059	44.38%	967	20.85%
1916	2,442	50.66%	2,262	46.93%	116	2.41%
1920	4,871	58.57%	3,375	40.58%	71	0.85%
1924	4,475	56.36%	3,138	39.52%	327	4.12%
1928	4,534	60.01%	2,980	39.44%	42	0.56%
1932	3,484	40.55%	4,976	57.91%	132	1.54%
1936	4,245	45.89%	4,863	52.57%	142	1.54%
1940	5,189	55.15%	4,176	44.38%	44	0.47%
1944	5,039	58.25%	3,570	41.27%	41	0.47%
1948	4,911	55.72%	3,849	43.67%	53	0.60%
1952	6,795	67.60%	3,211	31.94%	46	0.46%
1956	6,708	67.42%	3,219	32.36%	22	0.22%
1960	6,678	62.93%	3,914	36.88%	20	0.19%
1964	5,015	47.97%	5,407	51.72%	33	0.32%
1968	5,932	57.56%	3,395	32.95%	978	9.49%
1972	7,419	73.19%	2,675	26.39%	43	0.42%
1976	6,287	60.63%	3,963	38.22%	119	1.15%
1980	6,999	64.48%	3,247	29.91%	609	5.61%
1984	7,279	69.33%	3,157	30.07%	63	0.60%
1988	6,220	65.38%	3,256	34.23%	37	0.39%
1992	4,622	45.22%	2,988	29.23%	2,611	25.55%
1996	4,642	47.87%	3,396	35.02%	1,660	17.12%
2000	6,037	60.96%	3,655	36.90%	212	2.14%
2004	6,974	67.28%	3,277	31.61%	115	1.11%
2008	5,731	53.04%	4,839	44.78%	235	2.17%
2012	5,970	60.09%	3,637	36.61%	328	3.30%
2016	6,893	68.27%	2,590	25.65%	613	6.07%
2020	7,957	71.13%	3,032	27.10%	198	1.77%
2024	7,969	71.30%	2,945	26.35%	262	2.34%

== Demographics ==
Historical population
Census	Pop.	Note	%±
1840	1,832		—
1850	4,761		159.9%
1860	8,258		73.5%
1870	10,554		27.8%
1880	13,795		30.7%
1890	15,671		13.6%
1900	19,138		22.1%
1910	17,602		−8.0%
1920	17,351		−1.4%
1930	15,831		−8.8%
1940	17,037		7.6%
1950	18,042		5.9%
1960	19,709		9.2%
1970	20,995		6.5%
1980	23,867		13.7%
1990	23,265		−2.5%
2000	25,267		8.6%
2010	24,643		−2.5%
2020	24,688		0.2%
2025 (est.)	25,164	▲	1.9%
US Decennial Census; 1790-1960 1900-1990; 1990-2000 2010

=== Racial and ethnic composition ===
White County, Indiana – Racial and ethnic composition Note: the US Census treats Hispanic/Latino as an ethnic category. This table excludes Latinos from the racial categories and assigns them to a separate category. Hispanics/Latinos may be of any race.
Race / Ethnicity (NH = Non-Hispanic)	Pop 1980	Pop 1990	Pop 2000	Pop 2010	Pop 2020	% 1980	% 1990	% 2000	% 2010	% 2020
White alone (NH)	23,684	22,998	23,580	22,470	21,203	99.23%	98.85%	93.32%	91.18%	85.88%
Black or African American alone (NH)	10	2	35	51	111	0.04%	0.01%	0.14%	0.21%	0.45%
Native American or Alaska Native alone (NH)	20	49	59	52	50	0.08%	0.21%	0.23%	0.21%	0.20%
Asian alone (NH)	41	38	62	83	94	0.17%	0.16%	0.25%	0.34%	0.38%
Native Hawaiian or Pacific Islander alone (NH)	x	x	8	4	6	x	x	0.03%	0.02%	0.02%
Other race alone (NH)	8	3	11	10	29	0.03%	0.01%	0.04%	0.04%	0.12%
Mixed race or Multiracial (NH)	x	x	163	227	742	x	x	0.65%	0.92%	3.01%
Hispanic or Latino (any race)	104	175	1,349	1,746	2,453	0.44%	0.75%	5.34%	7.09%	9.94%
Total	23,867	23,265	25,267	24,643	24,688	100.00%	100.00%	100.00%	100.00%	100.00%

=== 2020 census ===
As of the 2020 census, the county had a population of 24,688. The median age was 43.1 years. 23.1% of residents were under the age of 18 and 20.7% of residents were 65 years of age or older. For every 100 females there were 99.9 males, and for every 100 females age 18 and over there were 97.9 males age 18 and over.

The racial makeup of the county was 87.7% White, 0.5% Black or African American, 0.4% American Indian and Alaska Native, 0.4% Asian, <0.1% Native Hawaiian and Pacific Islander, 5.1% from some other race, and 5.8% from two or more races. Hispanic or Latino residents of any race comprised 9.9% of the population.

38.6% of residents lived in urban areas, while 61.4% lived in rural areas.

There were 9,936 households in the county, of which 29.0% had children under the age of 18 living in them. Of all households, 51.6% were married-couple households, 17.9% were households with a male householder and no spouse or partner present, and 23.0% were households with a female householder and no spouse or partner present. About 27.4% of all households were made up of individuals and 13.5% had someone living alone who was 65 years of age or older.

There were 12,866 housing units, of which 22.8% were vacant. Among occupied housing units, 75.0% were owner-occupied and 25.0% were renter-occupied. The homeowner vacancy rate was 1.5% and the rental vacancy rate was 7.7%.

=== 2010 Census ===
As of the 2010 United States census, there were 24,643 people, 9,741 households, and 6,849 families in the county. The population density was 48.8 inhabitants per square mile (18.8/km^{2}). There were 12,970 housing units at an average density of 25.7 per square mile (9.9/km^{2}). The racial makeup of the county was 93.9% white, 0.4% Asian, 0.3% American Indian, 0.3% black or African American, 3.7% from other races, and 1.4% from two or more races. Those of Hispanic or Latino origin made up 7.1% of the population. In terms of ancestry, 27.0% were German, 13.3% were Irish, 9.7% were English, and 8.4% were American.

Of the 9,741 households, 31.3% had children under the age of 18 living with them, 56.1% were married couples living together, 9.3% had a female householder with no husband present, 29.7% were non-families, and 24.8% of all households were made up of individuals. The average household size was 2.50 and the average family size was 2.96. The median age was 41.9 years.

The median income for a household in the county was $47,697 and the median income for a family was $52,626. Males had a median income of $39,715 versus $28,880 for females. The per capita income for the county was $22,323. About 7.7% of families and 9.5% of the population were below the poverty line, including 13.0% of those under age 18 and 4.5% of those age 65 or over.

== Education ==
Five school districts have portions of the county: Frontier School Corporation, North White School Corporation, Tri-County School Corporation, Twin Lakes School Corporation, and Pioneer Regional School Corporation.

=== High schools and middle schools ===
- Tri-County Middle/Senior High School
- Frontier Junior-Senior High School
- North White High School
- North White Middle School
- Roosevelt Middle School
- Twin Lakes High School

=== Elementary Schools ===
- Eastlawn Elementary School
- Frontier Elementary School
- Meadowlawn Elementary School
- Monon Elementary School
- Oaklawn Elementary School
- Tri-County Intermediate School

== See also ==
- Meadow Lake Wind Farm
- National Register of Historic Places listings in White County, Indiana
