= Honey Creek Township, White County, Indiana =

Honey Creek Township
- Township
- Location in White County
- Coordinates: 40°46′21″N 86°52′22″W
- Country: United States
- State: Indiana
- County: White

Government
  - Type: Indiana township

Area
  - Total: 42.36 sq mi (109.7 km^{2})
  - Land: 42.35 sq mi (109.7 km^{2})
  - Water: 0.01 sq mi (0.026 km^{2}) 0.02%
- Elevation: 686 ft (209 m)

Population (2020)
  - Total: 1,188
  - Density: 28.05/sq mi (10.83/km^{2})
- ZIP codes: 47959, 47960, 47980
- GNIS feature ID: 453418

Honey Creek Township is one of twelve townships in White County, Indiana, United States. As of the 2020 census, its population was 1,188 and it contained 503 housing units.

Honey Creek Township was organized in 1855. The township took its name from Honey Creek.

Historical population
Census	Pop.	Note	%±
1890	893		—
1900	1,215		36.1%
1910	946		−22.1%
1920	871		−7.9%
1930	596		−31.6%
1940	772		29.5%
1950	651		−15.7%
1960	632		−2.9%
1970	614		−2.8%
1980	570		−7.2%
1990	569		−0.2%
2000	590		3.7%
2010	585		−0.8%
2020	583		−0.3%
Source: US Decennial Census

== Geography ==
According to the 2010 census, the township has a total area of 42.36 square miles (109.7 km^{2}), of which 42.35 square miles (109.7 km^{2}) (or 99.98%) is land and 0.01 square miles (0.026 km^{2}) (or 0.02%) is water.

=== Cities, towns, villages ===
The one incorporated town in Honey Creek Township is Reynolds, located about five miles west of Monticello at the intersection of Indiana State Road 43 and U.S. Routes 24 and 421, and on the short Toledo, Peoria and Western Railway.

An unincorporated site named Guernsey used to exist on the eastern border with Union Township at what's now the corner of County Roads 325 North and 300 East, consisting of a railroad siding, post office (1882–1907), and grain elevator (removed c. 1950).

=== Adjacent townships ===
- Monon Township (north)
- Union Township (east)
- Big Creek Township (south)
- West Point Township (southwest)
- Princeton Township (west)

=== Cemeteries ===
The township contains these two cemeteries: Bunnell and Swisher.

=== Airports and landing strips ===
- Klopfenstein Airport

== School districts ==
It is in the North White School Corporation.

== Political districts ==
- Indiana's 4th congressional district
- State House District 16
- State Senate District 07
