= White Post Township, Pulaski County, Indiana =

White Post Township
- Township
- Location in Pulaski County
- Coordinates: 41°02′21″N 86°52′23″W
- Country: United States
- State: Indiana
- County: Pulaski

Government
  - Type: Indiana township

Area
  - Total: 36.46 sq mi (94.4 km^{2})
  - Land: 36.46 sq mi (94.4 km^{2})
  - Water: 0 sq mi (0 km^{2}) 0%
- Elevation: 676 ft (206 m)

Population (2020)
  - Total: 1,072
  - Density: 29.40/sq mi (11.35/km^{2})
- ZIP codes: 47946, 47957
- GNIS feature ID: 454052

White Post Township is one of twelve townships in Pulaski County, Indiana, United States. As of the 2020 census, its population was 1,072 and it contained 450 housing units.

The township is an almost precise 6 mile by 6 mile square; 36.46 square miles and runs from the intersection of County Road 200N and County Road CR1700W (Jasper County line) southwards along CR1700W to CR400S thence east to CR 1100W thence north to CR200N and finally back west to the origin.

White Post Township took its name from a stagecoach stop named White Post, and it is supposed the stop was named for a nearby large white stump.

Historical population
Census	Pop.	Note	%±
1890	922		—
1900	1,384		50.1%
1910	1,401		1.2%
1920	1,281		−8.6%
1930	1,116		−12.9%
1940	1,307		17.1%
1950	1,372		5.0%
1960	1,284		−6.4%
1970	1,218		−5.1%
1980	1,252		2.8%
1990	1,242		−0.8%
2000	1,069		−13.9%
2010	1,075		0.6%
2020	1,072		−0.3%
Source: US Decennial Census

== Geography ==
According to the 2010 census, the township has a total area of 36.46 square miles (94.4 km^{2}), all land.

=== Cities, towns, villages ===
- Medaryville

=== Adjacent townships ===
- Cass Township (north)
- Rich Grove Township (northeast)
- Jefferson Township (east)
- Beaver Township (southeast)
- Salem Township (south)
- Gillam Township, Jasper County (west)

=== Cemeteries ===
The township contains five cemeteries: White Post, Medaryville (or Rose Hill), Bowman, Saint Henry's and Saint Mark's.

=== Major highways ===
- U.S. Route 421
- Indiana State Road 14
- Indiana State Road 114

== Education ==
- West Central School Corporation

White Post Township residents may obtain a free library card from the Pulaski County Public Library in Winamac.

== Political districts ==
- Indiana's 2nd congressional district
- State House District 20
- State Senate District 18
