= Monroe Township, Pulaski County, Indiana =

Monroe Township
- Township
- Location in Pulaski County
- Coordinates: 41°02′52″N 86°37′57″W
- Country: United States
- State: Indiana
- County: Pulaski

Government
  - Type: Indiana township

Area
  - Total: 41.3 sq mi (107 km^{2})
  - Land: 40.95 sq mi (106.1 km^{2})
  - Water: 0.35 sq mi (0.91 km^{2}) 0.85%
- Elevation: 709 ft (216 m)

Population (2020)
  - Total: 3,850
  - Density: 94.0/sq mi (36.3/km^{2})
- ZIP codes: 46985, 46996
- GNIS feature ID: 453645

Monroe Township is one of twelve townships in Pulaski County, Indiana, United States. As of the 2020 census, its population was 3,850 and it contained 1,841 housing units.

Historical population
Census	Pop.	Note	%±
1890	2,332		—
1900	2,830		21.4%
1910	2,681		−5.3%
1920	2,590		−3.4%
1930	2,509		−3.1%
1940	2,786		11.0%
1950	3,170		13.8%
1960	3,531		11.4%
1970	3,664		3.8%
1980	3,833		4.6%
1990	3,802		−0.8%
2000	4,015		5.6%
2010	4,019		0.1%
2020	3,850		−4.2%
Source: US Decennial Census

== History ==
The Pulaski County Home was listed on the National Register of Historic Places in 2015.

== Geography ==
According to the 2010 census, the township has a total area of 41.3 square miles (107 km^{2}), of which 40.95 square miles (106.1 km^{2}) (or 99.15%) is land and 0.35 square miles (0.91 km^{2}) (or 0.85%) is water.

=== Cities, towns, villages ===
- Winamac

=== Adjacent townships ===
- Franklin Township (north)
- Tippecanoe Township (northeast)
- Harrison Township (east)
- Van Buren Township (southeast)
- Indian Creek Township (south)
- Beaver Township (southwest)
- Jefferson Township (west)
- Rich Grove Township (northwest)

=== Cemeteries ===
The township contains these four cemeteries: Crown Hill, Memorial Gardens, Reed and Saint Peters.

=== Major highways ===
- U.S. Route 35
- Indiana State Road 14
- Indiana State Road 119

=== Rivers ===
- Tippecanoe River

== Education ==
- Eastern Pulaski Community School Corporation

Monroe Township residents may obtain a free library card from the Pulaski County Public Library in Winamac.

== Political districts ==
- Indiana's 2nd congressional district
- State House District 20
- State Senate District 18
