= Liberty Township, White County, Indiana =

Liberty Township
- Township
- Location in White County
- Coordinates: 40°51′02″N 86°44′27″W
- Country: United States
- State: Indiana
- County: White

Government
  - Type: Indiana township

Area
  - Total: 33.99 sq mi (88.0 km^{2})
  - Land: 33.22 sq mi (86.0 km^{2})
  - Water: 0.77 sq mi (2.0 km^{2}) 2.27%
- Elevation: 676 ft (206 m)

Population (2020)
  - Total: 2,064
  - Density: 62.13/sq mi (23.99/km^{2})
- ZIP codes: 47925, 47960
- GNIS feature ID: 453567

Liberty Township is one of twelve townships in White County, Indiana, United States. As of the 2020 census, its population was 2,064 and it contained 1,971 housing units.

Liberty Township was established in 1838.

Historical population
Census	Pop.	Note	%±
1890	1,221		—
1900	1,266		3.7%
1910	1,011		−20.1%
1920	925		−8.5%
1930	841		−9.1%
1940	921		9.5%
1950	992		7.7%
1960	1,133		14.2%
1970	1,371		21.0%
1980	1,733		26.4%
1990	1,777		2.5%
2000	2,225		25.2%
2010	2,223		−0.1%
2020	2,064		−7.2%
Source: US Decennial Census

== Geography ==
According to the 2010 census, the township has a total area of 33.99 square miles (88.0 km^{2}), of which 33.22 square miles (86.0 km^{2}) (or 97.73%) is land and 0.77 square miles (2.0 km^{2}) (or 2.27%) is water.

=== Cities, towns, villages ===
- Buffalo

=== Unincorporated towns ===
- Sitka at 40.825595°N 86.73529°W

(This list is based on USGS data and may include former settlements.)

=== Adjacent townships ===
- Beaver Township, Pulaski County (north)
- Indian Creek Township, Pulaski County (northeast)
- Cass Township (east)
- Lincoln Township (southeast)
- Union Township (south)
- Monon Township (west)

=== Cemeteries ===
The township contains these three cemeteries: Clark, Hughes and Warden.

=== Landmarks ===
- Cp Buffalo

== School districts ==
Most of the township is in the North White School Corporation while a piece is in the Twin Lakes School Corporation.

== Political districts ==
- Indiana's 2nd congressional district
- State House District 15
- State House District 16
- State Senate District 07
