= North White School Corporation =

School district in Indiana

Location
- White County, Indiana United States
- Coordinates: 40.8680°N 86.8790°W

District information
- Type: Public school district
- Grades: PreK–12
- Superintendent: Dr. Teresa L. Gremaux
- NCES District ID: 1808130

Students and staff
- Enrollment: 909 (2021–22)
- Faculty: 57.0 (on an FTE basis)
- Student–teacher ratio: 15.95

Other information
- Website: www.nwhite.k12.in.us

North White School Corporation is a public school district located in White County, Indiana.

The district comprises Honey Creek and Monon township and most of Liberty Township, and includes Monon, Reynolds, and Buffalo.

== History ==
In 2011, Shannon Mattix, the president of the school board, advocated for a single countywide school district in White County. The other school districts did not agree with consolidation. Indiana Public Media stated that the idea of consolidation was "a popular plan" among residents of the North White school district.

== Schools ==
Schools in the North White School Corporation:

- North White Elementary School Grades K–5
- North White Middle High School Grades 6–12

Admin of North White Schools:

- Mrs. McIntire is the Principal of North White Elementary School
- Mr. VanDerAa is the Principal of North White Middle High School
- Ms. Holst is the Assistant Principal of North White Middle High School
- Mr. Woodcock is the Athletic Director of North White School Corporation
