= Radioville, Indiana =

- Unincorporated community
- Location within Indiana Location within the United States
- Coordinates: 41°09′35″N 86°53′28″W
- Country: United States
- State: Indiana
- County: Pulaski
- Township: Cass
- Elevation: 705 ft (215 m)
- Time zone: UTC-5 (Eastern (EST))
  - Summer (DST): UTC-4 (EDT)
- ZIP code: 46374
- GNIS feature ID: 453067

Radioville is an unincorporated community in Cass Township, Pulaski County, in the U.S. state of Indiana.

== History ==
For many years, the cultural center of Radioville and environs was a popular bowling alley and restaurant, known as Countryside Lanes, operated by local resident Bud Schroeder for over 40 years, from the early 1960s until his death in 2007.

Radioville was proposed to be established in October 1932 by Henry Ulrich. The planned community was to consist of homes, churches, schools and industry. Some bought lots and built homes but Ulrich's plan never evolved. The name is possibly derived from a procedure Ulrich performed called diathermy, a therapy using heat from condensed radio waves to relieve bone and muscle ailments. Residents also believe that radio broadcasting, including advertising for the Radioville community, and its developing popularity may have also encouraged the name. Today the community is not much more than a crossroads east of Pulaski.
