= Van Buren Township, Pulaski County, Indiana =

Van Buren Township
- Township
- Location in Pulaski County
- Coordinates: 40°57′22″N 86°31′48″W
- Country: USA
- State: Indiana
- County: Pulaski

Government
  - Type: Indiana township

Area
  - Total: 36.28 sq mi (94.0 km^{2})
  - Land: 36.28 sq mi (94.0 km^{2})
  - Water: 0 sq mi (0 km^{2}) 0%
- Elevation: 725 ft (221 m)

Population (2020)
  - Total: 854
  - Density: 23.5/sq mi (9.09/km^{2})
- ZIP codes: 46978, 46985
- GNIS feature ID: 453951

Van Buren Township is one of twelve townships in Pulaski County, Indiana, United States. As of the 2020 census, its population was 854 and it contained 375 housing units.

Van Buren Township was organized in 1842, and named for Martin Van Buren (1782–1862), eighth President of the United States (1837–1841).

Historical population
Census	Pop.	Note	%±
1890	1,259		—
1900	1,456		15.6%
1910	1,413		−3.0%
1920	1,337		−5.4%
1930	1,292		−3.4%
1940	1,218		−5.7%
1950	1,145		−6.0%
1960	1,101		−3.8%
1970	974		−11.5%
1980	1,014		4.1%
1990	951		−6.2%
2000	1,005		5.7%
2010	911		−9.4%
2020	854		−6.3%
Source: US Decennial Census

== Geography ==
According to the 2010 census, the township has a total area of 36.28 square miles (94.0 km^{2}), all land.

=== Cities, towns, villages ===
- Star City

=== Unincorporated towns ===
- Thornhope at 40.925874°N 86.529450°W

(This list is based on USGS data and may include former settlements.)

=== Adjacent townships ===
- Harrison Township (north)
- Union Township, Fulton County (northeast)
- Wayne Township, Fulton County (east)
- Harrison Township, Cass County (southeast)
- Boone Township, Cass County (south)
- Cass Township, White County (southwest)
- Indian Creek Township (west)
- Monroe Township (northwest)

=== Cemeteries ===
The township contains these four cemeteries: Buck, Independent Order of Odd Fellows (now known as Star City West Cemetery), Mull and Victor Chapel.

=== Major highways ===
- U.S. Route 35

== Education ==
- Eastern Pulaski Community School Corporation

Van Buren Township residents may obtain a free library card from the Pulaski County Public Library in Winamac.

== Political districts ==
- Indiana's 2nd congressional district
- State House District 16
- State Senate District 18
