= Clarence Hansell =

American research engineer

Clarence Weston Hansell (January 20, 1898 – c. 1967) was an American research engineer who pioneered investigation into the biological effects of ion air. He was granted over 300 US patents, including, in the 1930s, a precursor to the modern ink jet printer that could print 750 words a minute, its data received via radio telegraph. Only Thomas Edison held more patents.

== Life and education ==
Hansell was born in Medaryville, Indiana on January 20, 1898. He graduated from Purdue University with a Bachelor of Science degree in electrical engineering in 1919. He was awarded an honorary Doctorate of Electrical Engineering in 1952.

== Career ==
Hansell founded the RCA Radio Transmission Laboratory at Rocky Point, New York, Long Island in 1925, and headed the lab for over 30 years. He was also involved in radio and fiber optics research and suggested the invention of polarized sunglasses.

His interest in the biological effects of ionized air was spurred in 1932 when he noticed that the moods of one of his colleagues at Rocky Point Laboratory swung in response to the ions being generated by their equipment. He noted that when the equipment generated negative ions, his colleague's mood was upbeat. Conversely, positive ions generated a downbeat mood. Hansell researched the therapeutic possibilities of negative ions throughout his life. Current scientific studies support his findings, and negative ion therapy may be useful in alleviating depression in some people.

He died in 1967. His papers are kept at State University of New York, Stony Brook.
