= Monon Commercial Historic District =

Historic district in Indiana, United States

- U.S. National Register of Historic Places
- U.S. Historic district
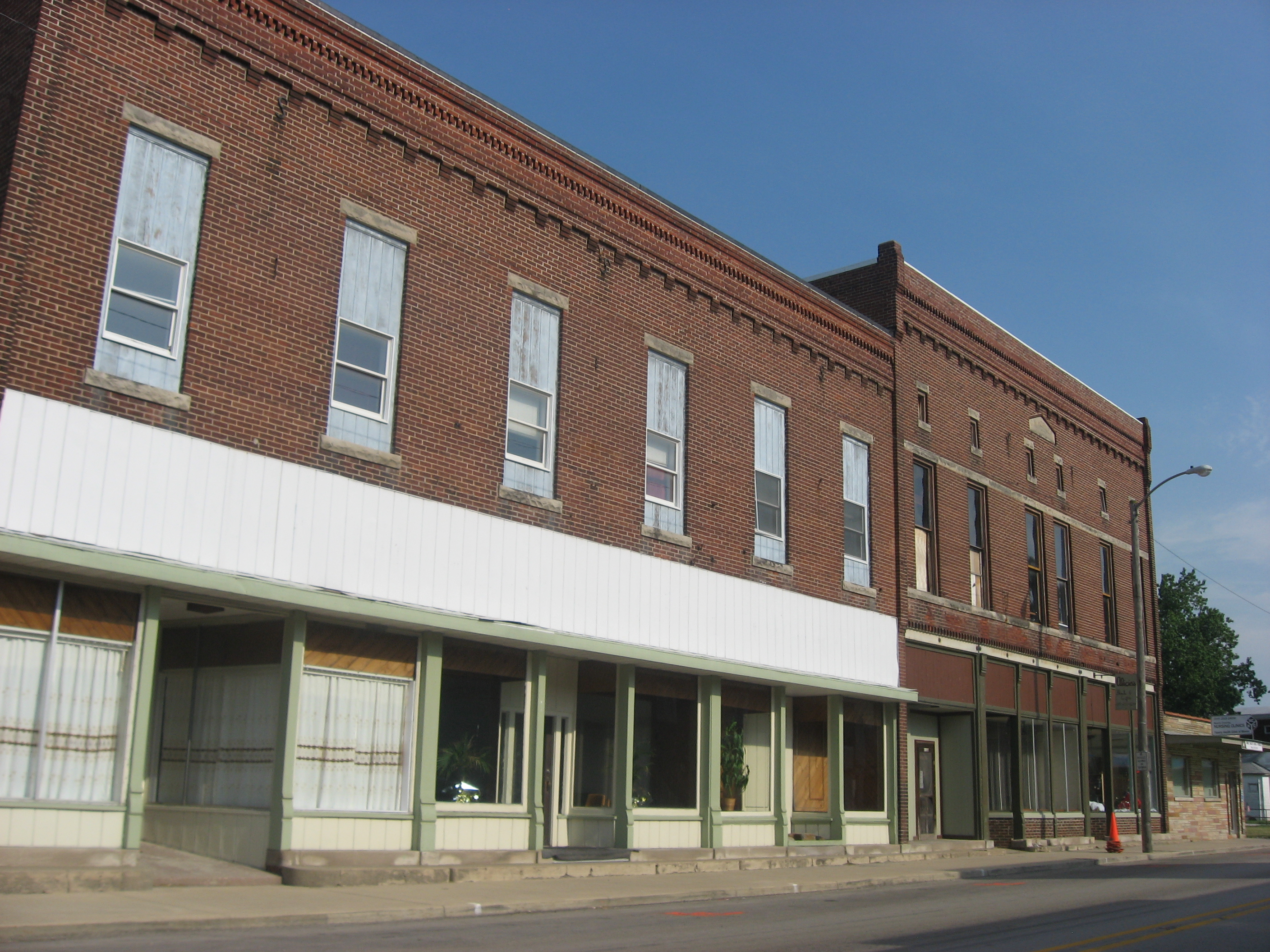
- Monon Commercial Historic Historic District, June 2012

- Location within Indiana Location within the United States
- Location: Roughly Market St., bet. 3rd St. and 5th St., and 4th St. bet. Arch St. and Railroad St., Monon, Indiana
- Coordinates: 40°51′41″N 86°52′40″W
- Area: 5 acres (2.0 ha)
- Architect: Brookie, True L.
- Architectural style: Italianate, Classical Revival
- NRHP reference No.: 00000672
- Added to NRHP: June 15, 2000

Monon Commercial Historic District is a national historic district located at Monon, Indiana. The district encompasses 24 contributing buildings in the central business district of Monon. It developed between about 1860 and 1940 and includes representative examples of Italianate and Classical Revival style architecture. Notable contributing resources include the C.M. Horner's Bank (c. 1870, 1921), Monon Town Hall (c. 1920), Carnegie Library, Howard Theater (1938), Pogue Building (c. 1895), Fred Thomas Building (1912), Tull Block (1921), James Tull / J. Lackerman Building (c. 1895), Newbold Oldsmobile Building (c. 1910), State Bank of Monon (1912), and Odd Fellows Building (1911).

It was listed on the National Register of Historic Places in 2000.
