= Monon Township, White County, Indiana =

Monon Township
- Township
- Location in White County
- Coordinates: 40°52′16″N 86°52′46″W
- Country: United States
- State: Indiana
- County: White

Government
  - Type: Indiana township

Area
  - Total: 63.94 sq mi (165.6 km^{2})
  - Land: 63.42 sq mi (164.3 km^{2})
  - Water: 0.51 sq mi (1.3 km^{2}) 0.80%
- Elevation: 679 ft (207 m)

Population (2020)
  - Total: 3,286
  - Density: 51.81/sq mi (20.01/km^{2})
- ZIP codes: 46996, 47946, 47959, 47960, 47978
- GNIS feature ID: 453632

Monon Township is one of twelve townships in White County, Indiana, United States. As of the 2020 census, its population was 3,286 and it contained 1,919 housing units.

Historical population
Census	Pop.	Note	%±
1890	1,960		—
1900	2,441		24.5%
1910	2,363		−3.2%
1920	2,521		6.7%
1930	2,438		−3.3%
1940	2,455		0.7%
1950	2,684		9.3%
1960	2,594		−3.4%
1970	2,998		15.6%
1980	3,389		13.0%
1990	3,140		−7.3%
2000	3,272		4.2%
2010	3,282		0.3%
2020	3,286		0.1%
Source: US Decennial Census

== History ==
Monon Township was established in 1836, and named after Big Monon Creek.

The township's first post office was Monon, established in 1838; it moved to various locations around the township before coming to rest in the town of West Bradford, which was later renamed Monon after the post office. Other post offices established in the township in course of the 19th century were Cathcart, Flowerville, Lee, and Onoko. The only of these other post offices to survive into the early 20th century was at Lee, also known as Oakdale, which was also on the Monon Railroad.

== Geography ==
According to 2024 US Census data, the township has a total area of 63.94 square miles (165.6 km^{2}), of which 63.425 square miles (164.27 km^{2}) (or 99.2%) is land and 0.511 square miles (1.32 km^{2}) (or 0.8%) is water.

=== Cities, towns, villages ===
- Monon

=== Unincorporated towns ===
- Lee at 40.896428°N 86.968074°W

(This list is based on USGS data and may include former settlements.)

=== Adjacent townships ===
- Salem Township, Pulaski County (north)
- Beaver Township, Pulaski County (northeast)
- Liberty Township (east)
- Union Township (southeast)
- Honey Creek Township (south)
- Princeton Township (southwest)
- Milroy Township, Jasper County (west)
- Hanging Grove Township, Jasper County (northwest)

=== Cemeteries ===
The township contains these three cemeteries: Bedford, Monon and Wilson.

=== Airports and landing strips ===
- Garwood Memorial Airport

=== Landmarks ===
- Bedford Cemetery
- Monon Park

== Education ==
Monon Township is in the North White School Corporation.

The township is served by the Monon Town & Township Public Library.

== Political districts ==
- Indiana's 4th congressional district
- State House District 25
- State Senate District 07
