= Beaver Township, Taney County, Missouri =

Township in Taney County, Missouri, U.S.

Coordinates: 36.7000°N 92.9067°W

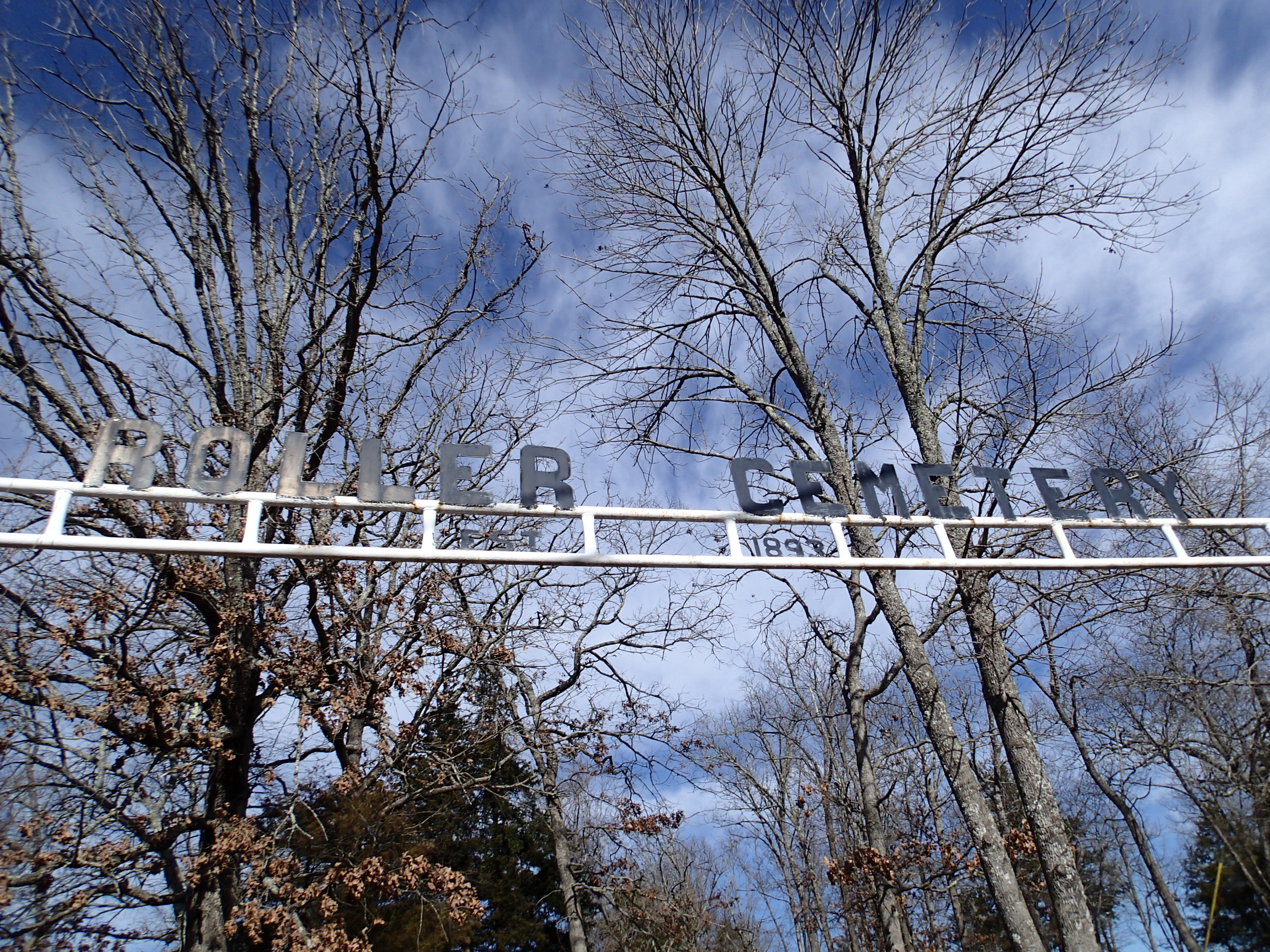
Beaver Township, Missouri

Beaver Township is an active township in Taney County, in the U.S. state of Missouri.

Beaver Township was founded in 1837, taking its name from Beaver Creek.
