= Indian Creek Township, Pulaski County, Indiana =

Indian Creek Township
- Township
- Location in Pulaski County
- Coordinates: 40°57′07″N 86°38′11″W
- Country: United States
- State: Indiana
- County: Pulaski

Government
  - Type: Indiana township

Area
  - Total: 35.77 sq mi (92.6 km^{2})
  - Land: 35.51 sq mi (92.0 km^{2})
  - Water: 0.26 sq mi (0.67 km^{2}) 0.73%
- Elevation: 699 ft (213 m)

Population (2020)
  - Total: 595
  - Density: 16.8/sq mi (6.47/km^{2})
- ZIP codes: 46985, 46996
- GNIS feature ID: 453427

Indian Creek Township is one of twelve townships in Pulaski County, Indiana, United States. As of the 2020 census, its population was 595 and it contained 368 housing units.

Indian Creek Township was organized in 1842, and named after Indian Creek.

Historical population
Census	Pop.	Note	%±
1890	1,027		—
1900	1,136		10.6%
1910	993		−12.6%
1920	878		−11.6%
1930	826		−5.9%
1940	735		−11.0%
1950	679		−7.6%
1960	685		0.9%
1970	718		4.8%
1980	645		−10.2%
1990	632		−2.0%
2000	756		19.6%
2010	691		−8.6%
2020	595		−13.9%
Source: US Decennial Census

== Geography ==
According to the 2010 census, the township has a total area of 35.77 square miles (92.6 km^{2}), of which 35.51 square miles (92.0 km^{2}) (or 99.27%) is land and 0.26 square miles (0.67 km^{2}) (or 0.73%) is water.

=== Unincorporated towns ===
- Pulaski at 40.975318°N 86.658343°W

(This list is based on USGS data and may include former settlements.)

=== Adjacent townships ===
- Monroe Township (north)
- Harrison Township (northeast)
- Van Buren Township (east)
- Cass Township, White County (south)
- Liberty Township, White County (southwest)
- Beaver Township (west)
- Jefferson Township (northwest)

=== Cemeteries ===
The township contains these three cemeteries: Hoover, Indian Creek and Saint Joseph's.

=== Airports and landing strips ===
- Allen Airport

=== Major highways ===
- Indiana State Road 119

== Education ==
- Eastern Pulaski Community School Corporation

Indian Creek Township residents may obtain a free library card from the Pulaski County Public Library in Winamac.

== Political districts ==
- Indiana's 2nd congressional district
- State House District 16
- State Senate District 18
