= Buffalo, Indiana =

- Census-designated place
- Location of Buffalo in White County, Indiana.
- Coordinates: 40°53′8″N 86°44′27″W
- Country: United States
- State: Indiana
- County: White
- Township: Liberty
- Platted: 1886
- Named for: Buffalo, New York

Area
  - Total: 2.54 sq mi (6.57 km^{2})
  - Land: 2.37 sq mi (6.14 km^{2})
  - Water: 0.17 sq mi (0.43 km^{2})
- Elevation: 666 ft (203 m)

Population (2020)
  - Total: 619
  - Density: 261.0/sq mi (100.77/km^{2})
- Time zone: UTC-5 (Eastern (EST))
  - Summer (DST): UTC-4 (EDT)
- ZIP code: 47925 & 47960
- Area code: 574
- FIPS code: 18-08992
- GNIS feature ID: 431770
- Website: home.whitecountyindiana.us

Buffalo is a census-designated place (CDP) in Liberty Township, White County, in the U.S. state of Indiana. The population was 619 at the 2020 census.

== History ==
Buffalo was platted in 1886, and named for Buffalo, New York, the native state of an early settler. The post office at Buffalo has been in operation since 1851.

== Geography ==
Buffalo is located at 40°53′8″N 86°44′27″W (40.885501, -86.740858).

According to the United States Census Bureau, the CDP has a total area of 2.5 square miles (6.6 km^{2}), of which 2.4 square miles (6.2 km^{2}) is land and 0.2 square mile (0.4 km^{2}) (6.27%) is water.

== Demographics ==
Historical population
Census	Pop.	Note	%±
2020	619		—
U.S. Decennial Census

=== 2000 census ===
As of the 2000 United States census, there were 672 people, 264 households, and 196 families in the CDP. The population density was 281.7 inhabitants per square mile (108.8/km^{2}). There were 585 housing units at an average density of 245.3/square mile (94.5/km^{2}). The racial makeup of the CDP was 98.96% White, 0.89% from other races, and 0.15% from two or more races. Hispanic or Latino of any race were 2.38% of the population.

There were 264 households, out of which 27.7% had children under the age of 18 living with them, 62.9% were married couples living together, 4.9% had a female householder with no husband present, and 25.4% were non-families. 18.9% of all households were made up of individuals, and 11.0% had someone living alone who was 65 years of age or older. The average household size was 2.55 and the average family size was 2.79.

The population contained 24.4% under the age of 18, 6.4% from 18 to 24, 27.2% from 25 to 44, 23.4% from 45 to 64, and 18.6% who were 65 years of age or older. The median age was 41 years. For every 100 females, there were 104.3 males. For every 100 females age 18 and over, there were 107.3 males.

The median income for a household in the CDP was $29,583, and the median income for a family was $40,446. Males had a median income of $29,609 versus $14,423 for females. The per capita income for the CDP was $15,062. About 3.7% of families and 10.5% of the population were below the poverty line, including 13.4% of those under age 18 and 9.8% of those age 65 or over.

== Education ==
It is in the North White School Corporation.
