= Reynolds, Indiana =

- Town
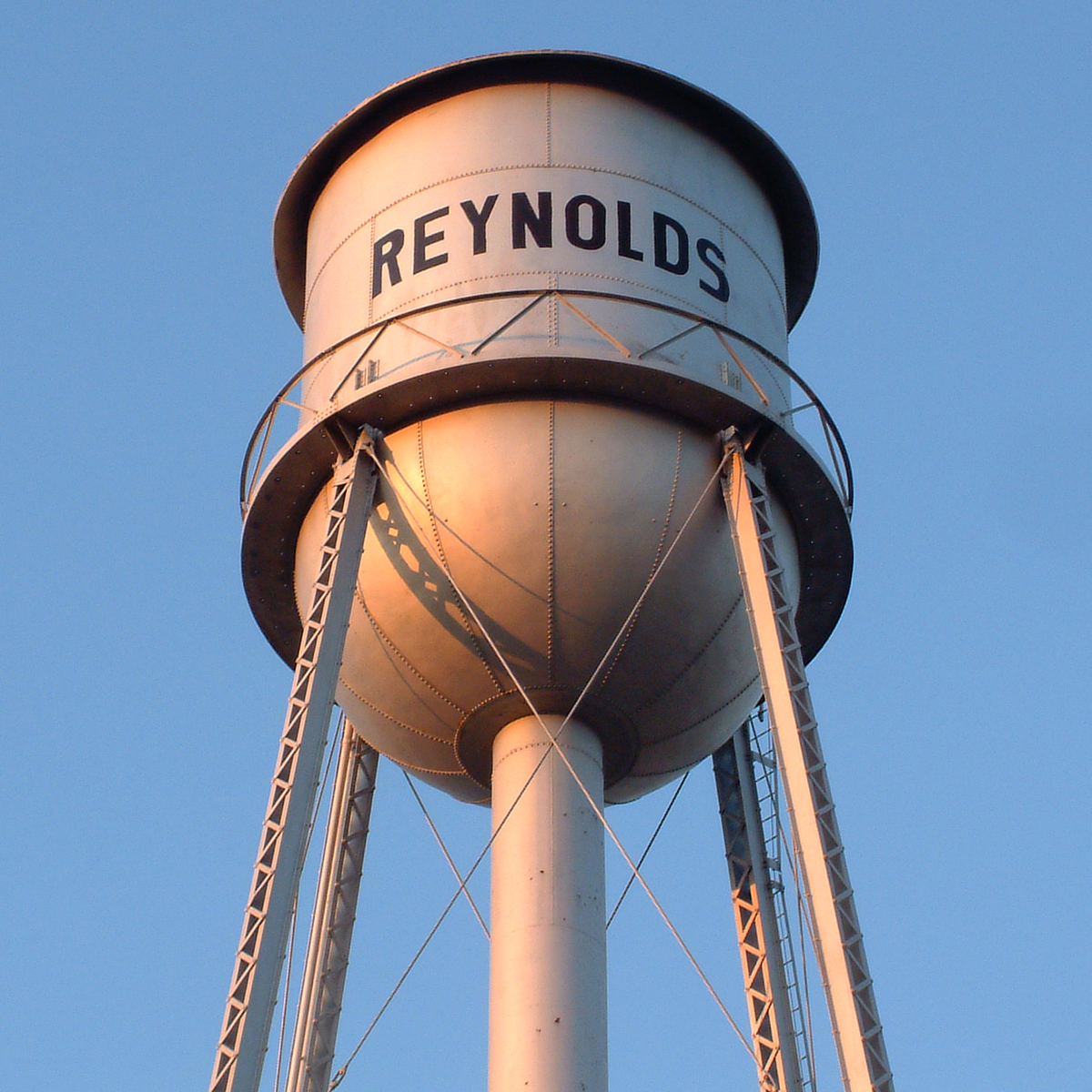
- The Reynolds water tower

- Logo

- Location of Reynolds in White County, Indiana.
- Coordinates: 40°45′0″N 86°52′25″W
- Country: United States
- State: Indiana
- County: White
- Township: Honey Creek
- Founded: c. 1854
- Incorporated: 1875

Area
  - Total: 0.55 sq mi (1.43 km^{2})
  - Land: 0.55 sq mi (1.43 km^{2})
  - Water: 0 sq mi (0.00 km^{2})
- Elevation: 699 ft (213 m)

Population (2020)
  - Total: 531
  - Density: 959.4/sq mi (370.44/km^{2})
- Time zone: UTC-5 (Eastern (EST))
  - Summer (DST): UTC-4 (EDT)
- ZIP code: 47980
- Area code: 219
- FIPS code: 18-63918
- GNIS feature ID: 441922
- Website: reynolds.in.gov

Reynolds is a town in Honey Creek Township, White County, in the U.S. state of Indiana. The population was 531 at the 2020 census.

== History ==
Reynolds was platted around 1854 when the railroad was extended to that point. The town was named for Benjamin Reynolds, one of its founders. A post office has been in operation at Reynolds since 1853. Reynolds was incorporated as a town in 1875.

== Geography ==
According to the 2010 census, Reynolds has a total area of 0.55 square miles (1.42 km^{2}), all land.

== Demographics ==
Historical population
Census	Pop.	Note	%±
1860	15		—
1870	306		1,940.0%
1880	370		20.9%
1890	348		−5.9%
1900	398		14.4%
1910	377		−5.3%
1920	379		0.5%
1930	362		−4.5%
1940	408		12.7%
1950	499		22.3%
1960	547		9.6%
1970	641		17.2%
1980	632		−1.4%
1990	528		−16.5%
2000	547		3.6%
2010	533		−2.6%
2020	531		−0.4%
U.S. Decennial Census

Mean prices in 2008: All housing units: $189,808; Detached houses: $191,528; Townhouses or other attached units: $186,187; Mobile homes: $116,429

=== 2010 census ===
As of the census of 2010, there were 533 people, 215 households, and 151 families living in the town. The population density was 969.1 inhabitants per square mile (374.2/km^{2}). There were 244 housing units at an average density of 443.6 per square mile (171.3/km^{2}). The racial makeup of the town was 91.4% White, 0.2% African American, 2.1% Native American, 5.3% from other races, and 1.1% from two or more races. Hispanic or Latino of any race were 9.9% of the population.

There were 215 households, of which 30.7% had children under the age of 18 living with them, 53.0% were married couples living together, 13.5% had a female householder with no husband present, 3.7% had a male householder with no wife present, and 29.8% were non-families. 25.1% of all households were made up of individuals, and 13% had someone living alone who was 65 years of age or older. The average household size was 2.48 and the average family size was 2.93.

The median age in the town was 38.8 years. 24.4% of residents were under the age of 18; 7.8% were between the ages of 18 and 24; 25.5% were from 25 to 44; 26.3% were from 45 to 64; and 16.1% were 65 years of age or older. The gender makeup of the town was 47.3% male and 52.7% female.

=== 2000 census ===
As of the census of 2000, there were 547 people, 199 households, and 159 families living in the town. The population density was 1,036.2 inhabitants per square mile (400.1/km^{2}). There were 225 housing units at an average density of 426.2 per square mile (164.6/km^{2}). The racial makeup of the town was 99.58% White, 1.46% Native American, 0.18% Asian, 0.18% Pacific Islander, 7.86% from other races, and 0.73% from two or more races. Hispanic or Latino of any race were 8.78% of the population.

There were 199 households, out of which 44.2% had children under the age of 18 living with them, 63.3% were married couples living together, 9.5% had a female householder with no husband present, and 20.1% were non-families. 17.1% of all households were made up of individuals, and 7.0% had someone living alone who was 65 years of age or older. The average household size was 2.75 and the average family size was 3.06.

In the town, the population was spread out, with 31.4% under the age of 18, 6.6% from 18 to 24, 32.5% from 25 to 44, 17.4% from 45 to 64, and 12.1% who were 65 years of age or older. The median age was 33 years. For every 100 females, there were 91.3 males. For every 100 females age 18 and over, there were 93.3 males.

The median income for a household in the town was $40,833, and the median income for a family was $74,083. Males had a median income of $42,250 versus $12,417 for females. The per capita income for the town was $16,188. About 2.0% of families and 4.6% of the population were below the poverty line, including 3.5% of those under age 18 and 3.8% of those age 65 or over.

== Arts and culture ==
=== BioTown, USA ===
In 2005, the Indiana State Department of Agriculture began a program to make Reynolds an energy self-sufficient community, able to subsist almost entirely on locally produced alternative energy. Called "BioTown, USA", the pilot project involved converting local vehicles to run on ethanol and biodiesel fuels and converting animal waste into electricity and natural gas.

Reynolds was selected to become BioTown, USA because of its size, its easy accessibility by road and by rail, and its proximity to both large-scale livestock farms and to Purdue University (Purdue is located in West Lafayette, Indiana). This process has been slow but Reynolds still holds the title.

== Education ==
It is in the North White School Corporation.
