= Medaryville, Indiana =

- Town
- Nicknames: Tater Town, Mudville
- Location of Medaryville in Pulaski County, Indiana.
- Coordinates: 41°04′49″N 86°53′26″W
- Country: United States
- State: Indiana
- County: Pulaski
- Township: White Post

Area
  - Total: 0.46 sq mi (1.19 km^{2})
  - Land: 0.46 sq mi (1.19 km^{2})
  - Water: 0 sq mi (0.00 km^{2})
- Elevation: 689 ft (210 m)

Population (2020)
  - Total: 559
  - Density: 1,218/sq mi (470.3/km^{2})
- Time zone: UTC-5 (Eastern (EST))
  - Summer (DST): UTC-4 (EDT)
- ZIP code: 47957
- Area code: 219
- FIPS code: 18-48186
- GNIS feature ID: 2396747
- Website: www.medaryville.net

Medaryville is a town in White Post Township, Pulaski County, in the U.S. state of Indiana. The population was 559 at the 2020 census.

== History ==
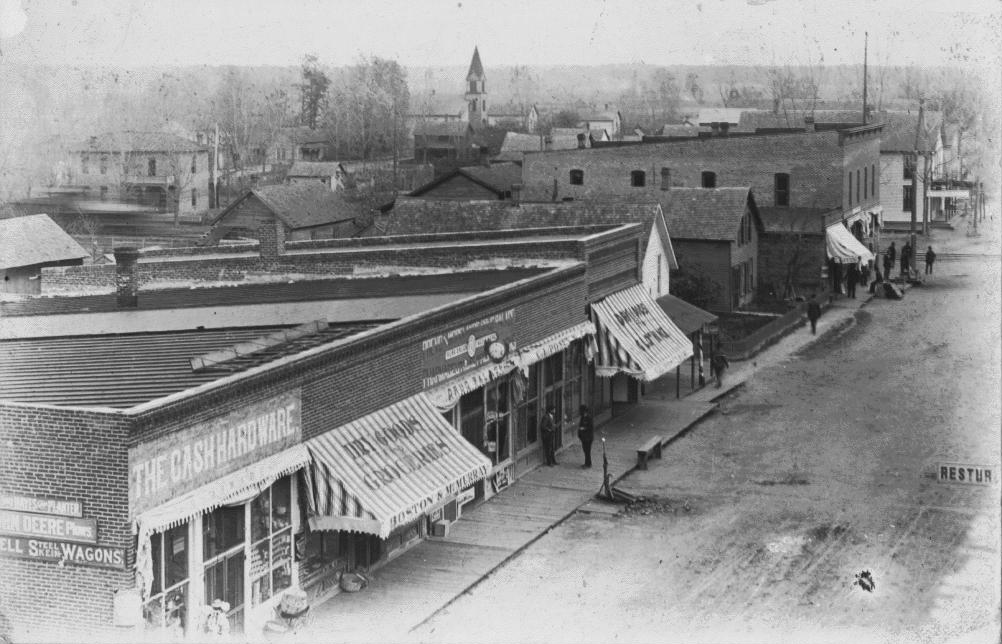
Downtown, 1890s

Medaryville was laid out in 1852, just ahead of the construction of the New Albany and Salem Railroad, later called the Monon Railroad. The town was sited at the intersection of the railroad and the old Rensselaer to Winamac Road, used by settlers to travel to the Land Office in Winamac to record their claims. Medaryville was one of the few towns along the new railroad that was not laid out by James Brooks, president of the line.

The railroad today comes into Medaryville from the south, but the tracks end just north of Pearl Street. The town has always been a commercial rail shipping center for agricultural products, and a large grain storage and shipping complex remains today.

Medaryville sits at the irregular intersection of two major landforms. The northern edge of what was called the Grand Prairie lies just south of the town, and the huge swampy outwash plains of the Greater Kankakee River basin are to the north and west. Just west of town once existed a vast "Impassable Swamp" which was known to the earliest European explorers of the continent.

It was drained as part of projects of the Swamp Land Act of 1850, which resulted in the disappearance of virtually all of the once-imposing swamps. Most of that land resides in adjacent Jasper county, where a Swamplands scandal in the early 1860s resulted in a county official, who was accused of embezzlement, burning down the local courthouse to cover his tracks before skipping town.

Before the areas were drained, the temperate swamps supported a nearly unimaginable variety of flora and fauna. Pioneer accounts relate an abundance of game of every type, and many local residents made their living by hunting and trapping in the early settlement days.

The "proprietors" of the new town were Josiah Walden and William Clark, who owned the land on the east and west sides of the railroad, respectively. They were assisted by Carter Hathaway, who was a surveyor, lawyer, politician, and entrepreneur.

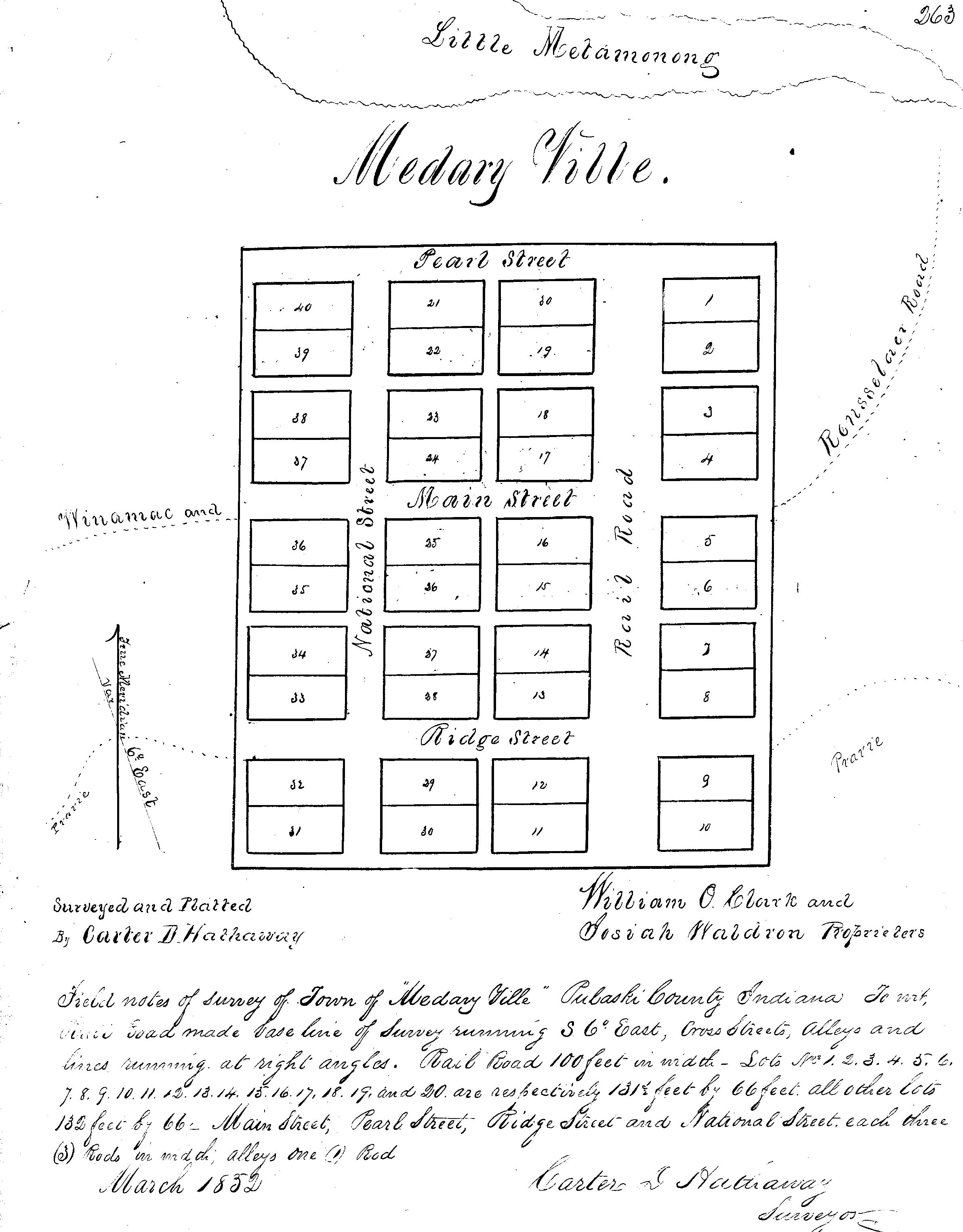
Original Plat Map

Hathaway's ornate map of the little town "Medary Ville" was recorded in March 1852, at the Pulaski County courthouse in Winamac, the county seat. The town was laid out using old English units of measure: all the lots were four rods by eight rods, with the streets three rods wide and the alleys one. There is an exception for the lots that abut the railroad, because the right-of-way was 100 feet, which isn't an even multiple of a rod.

Neither Walden nor Clark stayed in Medaryville. Reprising the migrations that brought them to the area, each moved west again. In 1857 Clark went to Iowa, selling what was left of his holdings to William Tolbert Elston, the town's first doctor. Walden left for Kansas in 1864, selling his interest in the town to James C. Faris, a lawyer. Faris's son George Washington Faris served several terms in the U.S. House of Representatives, representing an area surrounding his home in Terre Haute.

The town was most likely named after Samuel Medary, an Ohio newspaper editor and politician who moved west with the settlers and was the last governor of the Minnesota Territory before it gained statehood. He was later the governor of the Kansas Territory. Other towns named after him are Medary, Wisconsin, near the Minnesota border, and Medary, South Dakota, which was the first town platted in the Dakota Territory.

Medary was also a common given name in Carter Hathaway's family. He named his son Richard Medary, and his brother Richard named his son Medary Montez. In 1850 Carter Hathaway platted Knox, the county seat of adjoining Starke county. He was a judge and county official in Pulaski county in the 1850s. Just after the Civil War he and his son Richard were in Rochester, Indiana, where they were involved in editing and publishing The Standard, which later became the Rochester Sentinel.

Medaryville is shown as Madeiraville on Mitchell's New Universal Atlas, 1857. The town was once also commonly known Medarysville; one history incorrectly asserts that such was the original name.

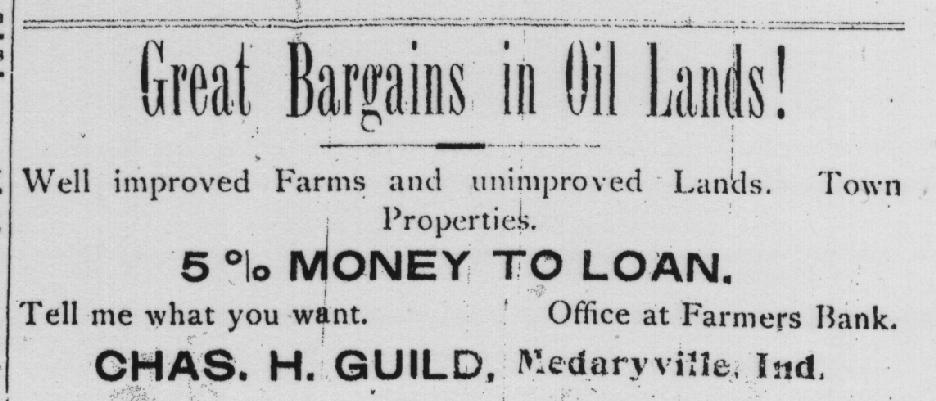
Ad seen during oil rush

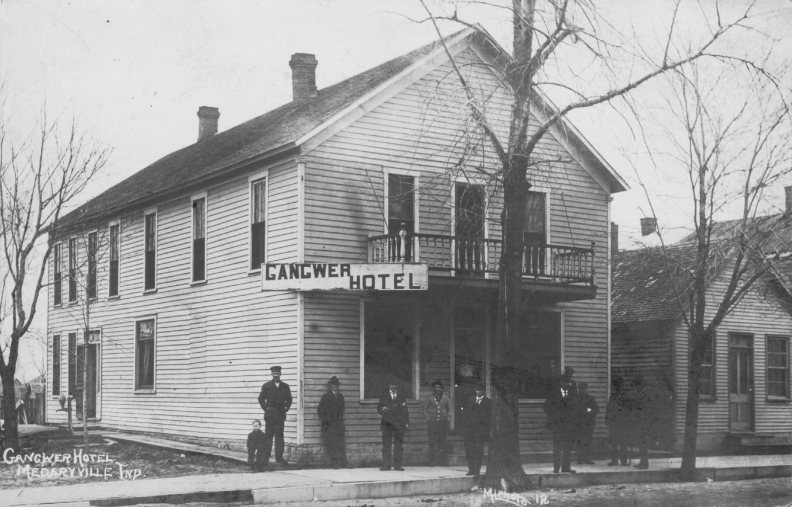
Medaryville's first buildings still stand

had an oil rush at the turn of the 20th century.  Many wells were  put in just west of town, and a refinery was built at the little town of Asphaltum.  The oil pockets were of limited production, however, and the oil of poor quality.  The enterprise was quickly abandoned.  Attempts to rekindle the boom occurred in the 1950s and again in the 1980s, without gaining traction.

Also at the turn of the century B. J. Gifford's ambitious agricultural enterprise, known locally as the Gifford Marsh, and his railroad, The Chicago and Wabash Valley, lay west of town. From the 1930s to about 1980 William Gehring grew vegetables on much of the old Gifford land. The proximity of the potato fields led to Medaryville's longstanding nickname "Tatertown." In the past, town held a festival known as the Potato Fest, in honor of this facet of its history.

== Geography ==
The Jasper-Pulaski Fish and Wildlife Area is northwest of town. This nature preserve is a stopover point for migrating Sandhill cranes, and attracts many visitors each fall. Each October the Medaryville/White Post Twp Fire Department sponsors a bike ride, known as the Crane Cruise, that runs through the heart of the migration territory.

According to the 2010 census, Medaryville has a total area of 0 square miles (0.00 km^{2}), all land.

== Demographics ==
Historical population
Census	Pop.	Note	%±
1860	98		—
1870	193		96.9%
1910	710		—
1920	624		−12.1%
1930	610		−2.2%
1940	703		15.2%
1950	833		18.5%
1960	758		−9.0%
1970	732		−3.4%
1980	731		−0.1%
1990	689		−5.7%
2000	565		−18.0%
2010	614		8.7%
2020	559		−9.0%
U.S. Decennial Census

=== 2010 census ===
As of the census of 2010, there were 614 people, 228 households, and 163 families residing in the town. The population density was 1,334.8 inhabitants per square mile (515.4/km^{2}). There were 274 housing units at an average density of 595.7 per square mile (230.0/km^{2}). The racial makeup of the town was 94.8% White, 0.2% Native American, 3.4% from other races, and 1.6% from two or more races. Hispanic or Latino of any race were 6.4% of the population.

There were 228 households, of which 34.6% had children under the age of 18 living with them, 50.9% were married couples living together, 12.3% had a female householder with no husband present, 8.3% had a male householder with no wife present, and 28.5% were non-families. 24.1% of all households were made up of individuals, and 10.1% had someone living alone who was 65 years of age or older. The average household size was 2.69 and the average family size was 3.10.

The median age in the town was 35.2 years. 25.9% of residents were under the age of 18; 10.2% were between the ages of 18 and 24; 24.7% were from 25 to 44; 24.9% were from 45 to 64; and 14.3% were 65 years of age or older. The gender makeup of the town was 48.9% male and 51.1% female.

=== 2000 census ===
As of the census of 2000, there were 565 people, 225 households, and 152 families residing in the town. The population density was 1,240.4 inhabitants per square mile (478.9/km^{2}). There were 256 housing units at an average density of 562.0 per square mile (217.0/km^{2}). The racial makeup of the town was 96.64% White, 0.18% Native American, 2.83% from other races, and 0.35% from two or more races. Hispanic or Latino of any race were 4.07% of the population.

There were 225 households, out of which 27.1% had children under the age of 18 living with them, 56.9% were married couples living together, 7.1% had a female householder with no husband present, and 32.4% were non-families. 28.9% of all households were made up of individuals, and 16.9% had someone living alone who was 65 years of age or older. The average household size was 2.51 and the average family size was 3.11.

In the town, the population was spread out, with 24.4% under the age of 18, 8.8% from 18 to 24, 25.0% from 25 to 44, 23.9% from 45 to 64, and 17.9% who were 65 years of age or older. The median age was 40 years. For every 100 females, there were 84.0 males. For every 100 females age 18 and over, there were 86.5 males.

The median income for a household in the town was $31,750, and the median income for a family was $40,750. Males had a median income of $29,904 versus $20,278 for females. The per capita income for the town was $14,937. About 3.1% of families and 4.9% of the population were below the poverty line, including 3.1% of those under age 18 and 1.8% of those age 65 or over.

== Notable people ==
- Clarence Hansell (1898–1967), research engineer
- Geneva Mitchell (1908–1949), actress
