= Cass Township, Pulaski County, Indiana =

Cass Township
- Township
- Location in Pulaski County
- Coordinates: 41°07′43″N 86°52′03″W
- Country: United States
- State: Indiana
- County: Pulaski

Government
  - Type: Indiana township

Area
  - Total: 36.16 sq mi (93.7 km^{2})
  - Land: 36.16 sq mi (93.7 km^{2})
  - Water: 0 sq mi (0 km^{2}) 0%
- Elevation: 705 ft (215 m)

Population (2020)
  - Total: 761
  - Density: 21.0/sq mi (8.13/km^{2})
- ZIP codes: 46366, 46374, 47957
- GNIS feature ID: 453167

Cass Township is one of twelve townships in Pulaski County, Indiana, United States. As of the 2020 census, its population was 761 and it contained 366 housing units.

Cass Township was organized in 1850.

Historical population
Census	Pop.	Note	%±
1890	594		—
1900	678		14.1%
1910	583		−14.0%
1920	524		−10.1%
1930	411		−21.6%
1940	519		26.3%
1950	595		14.6%
1960	667		12.1%
1970	670		0.4%
1980	913		36.3%
1990	788		−13.7%
2000	1,013		28.6%
2010	878		−13.3%
2020	761		−13.3%
Source: US Decennial Census

== Geography ==
According to the 2010 census, the township has a total area of 36.16 square miles (93.7 km^{2}), all land.

=== Unincorporated towns ===
- Radioville at 41.159762°N 86.891131°W

(This list is based on USGS data and may include former settlements.)

=== Adjacent townships ===
- Railroad Township, Starke County (north)
- Wayne Township, Starke County (northeast)
- Rich Grove Township (east)
- Jefferson Township (southeast)
- White Post Township (south)
- Gillam Township, Jasper County (southwest)
- Walker Township, Jasper County (west)
- Kankakee Township, Jasper County (northwest)

=== Cemeteries ===
The township contains Bethlehem Cemetery, Noggle Cemetery, St. John's Cemetery, and Sutton Cemetery.

=== Major highways ===
- U.S. Route 421

== Education ==
- North Judson-San Pierre School Corporation
- West Central School Corporation

Cass Township residents may obtain a free library card from the Pulaski County Public Library in Winamac.

== Political districts ==
- Indiana's 2nd congressional district
- State House District 20
- State Senate District 5
