= Beaver Township, Pulaski County, Indiana =

Beaver Township
- Township
- Location in Pulaski County
- Coordinates: 40°57′21″N 86°45′24″W
- Country: United States
- State: Indiana
- County: Pulaski

Government
  - Type: Indiana township

Area
  - Total: 35.6 sq mi (92 km^{2})
  - Land: 35.56 sq mi (92.1 km^{2})
  - Water: 0.04 sq mi (0.10 km^{2}) 0.11%
- Elevation: 686 ft (209 m)

Population (2020)
  - Total: 469
  - Density: 13.2/sq mi (5.09/km^{2})
- ZIP codes: 46985, 46996, 47946
- GNIS feature ID: 453103

Beaver Township is one of twelve townships in Pulaski County, Indiana, United States. As of the 2020 census, its population was 469 and it contained 191 housing units.

Beaver Township was organized in 1839, and named after Beaver Creek.

Historical population
Census	Pop.	Note	%±
1890	818		—
1900	1,069		30.7%
1910	772		−27.8%
1920	708		−8.3%
1930	510		−28.0%
1940	601		17.8%
1950	531		−11.6%
1960	494		−7.0%
1970	426		−13.8%
1980	439		3.1%
1990	379		−13.7%
2000	479		26.4%
2010	516		7.7%
2020	469		−9.1%
Source: US Decennial Census

== Geography ==
According to the 2010 census, the township has a total area of 35.6 square miles (92 km^{2}), of which 35.56 square miles (92.1 km^{2}) (or 99.89%) is land and 0.04 square miles (0.10 km^{2}) (or 0.11%) is water.

=== Unincorporated towns ===
(This list is based on USGS data and may include former settlements.)

=== Adjacent townships ===
- Jefferson Township (north)
- Monroe Township (northeast)
- Indian Creek Township (east)
- Liberty Township, White County (south)
- Monon Township, White County (southwest)
- Salem Township (west)
- White Post Township (northwest)

=== Major highways ===
- Indiana State Road 39

== School districts ==
- Eastern Pulaski Community School Corporation
- West Central School Corporation

== Political districts ==
- Indiana's 2nd congressional district
- State House District 20
- State Senate District 18
