= Beaver Township, Saline County, Arkansas =

Beaver Township
- Township
- Location in Arkansas Beaver Township (the United States)
- Coordinates: 34°43′08″N 92°35′15″W
- Country: United States
- State: Arkansas
- County: Saline

Area
  - Total: 35.367 sq mi (91.60 km^{2})
  - Land: 34.850 sq mi (90.26 km^{2})
  - Water: 0.517 sq mi (1.34 km^{2})
- Elevation: 545 ft (166 m)

Population (2010)
  - Total: 3,211
  - Density: 92.14/sq mi (35.57/km^{2})
- Time zone: UTC-6 (CST)
  - Summer (DST): UTC-5 (CDT)
- FIPS code: 05-90198
- GNIS ID: 66940

Beaver Township is a township in Saline County, Arkansas, United States. Its total population was 3,211 as of the 2010 United States census, an increase of 20.22 percent from 2,671 at the 2000 census.

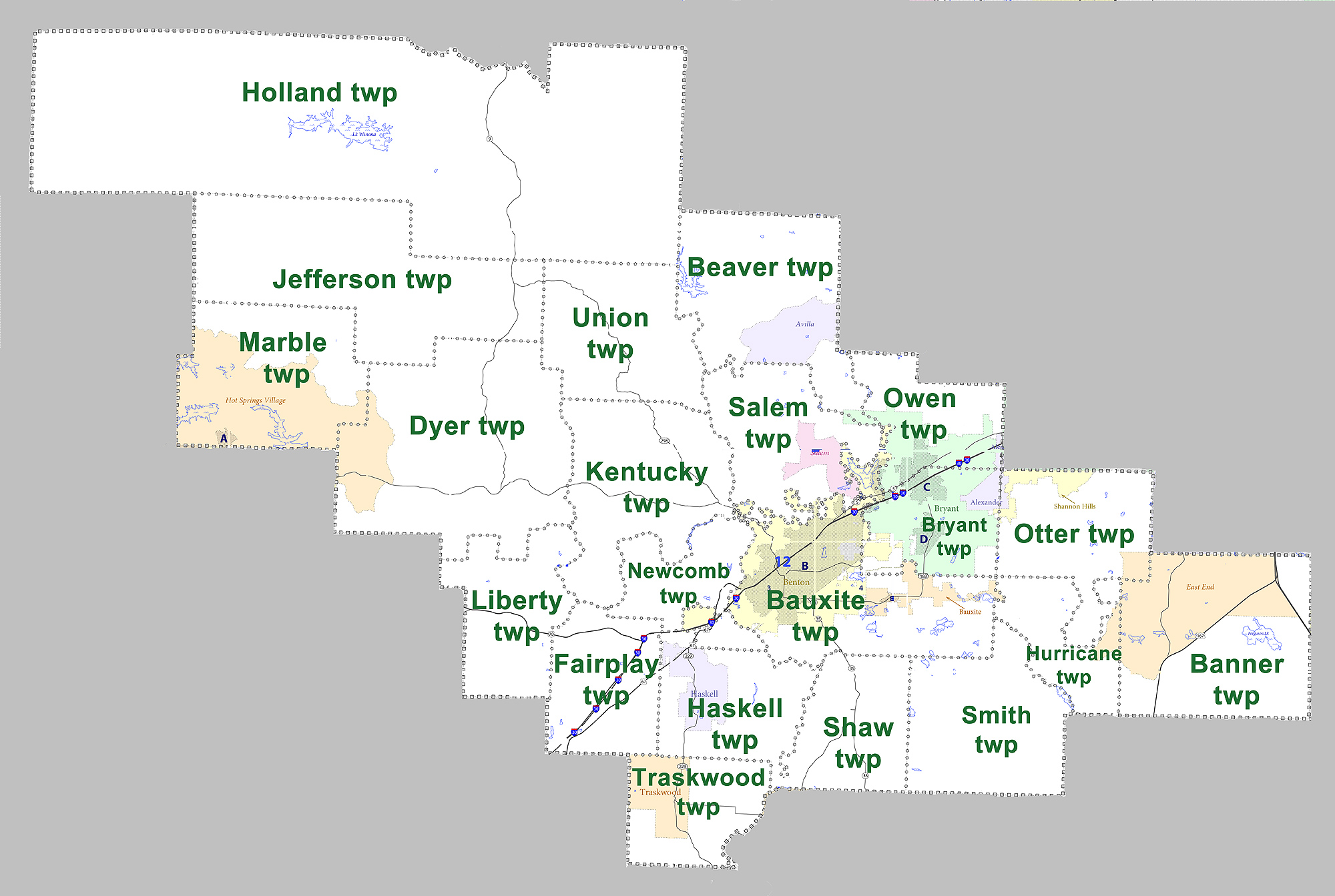
Townships in Saline County as of 2010

According to the 2010 Census, Beaver Township is located at 34°43′08″N 92°35′15″W (34.719002, -92.587488). It has a total area of 35.367 square miles (91.60 square kilometers), of which 34.850 sq mi (90.26 km^{2}) is land and 0.517 sq mi (1.34 km^{2}) is water (1.46%). As per the USGS National Elevation Dataset, the elevation is 545 feet (166 m).

Avilla and part of the city of Bryant are located within the township.
