= Culver Community Middle/High School =

Public high school in Indiana, United States

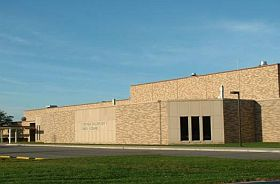

Location
- 701 School Street; Culver, Marshall, Indiana 46511; United States; 41.223637°N 86.425328°W

Information
- Type: Public high school
- Established: 1968
- School district: Culver Community Schools Corporation
- Superintendent: Karen Shuman
- Principal: Brett Berndt
- Teaching staff: 40.50 (FTE)
- Grades: 6–12
- Enrollment: 412 (2023–2024)
- Student to teacher ratio: 10.17
- Color
- Athletics conference: Hoosier North
- Nickname: Cavs
- Team name: Cavalier
- Accreditation: North Central
- Website: mhs.culver.k12.in.us

Culver Community Middle/High School is a comprehensive, public secondary school in Culver, Indiana, United States. It is fully accredited by the Indiana Department of Education and the North Central Association Commission on Accreditation and School Improvement. The school is part of the Culver Community Schools Corporation, along with one elementary school.

== About ==
Culver Community is a school corporation in Indiana that serves students from four townships in four different counties; Aubbeenaubbee Township in Fulton County, North Bend Township in Starke County, Tippecanoe Township in Pulaski County and Union Township in Marshall County. The building was opened in 1968, when these four townships consolidated into the current system.

Culver Community Middle/High School offers a full academic program, along with a vocational program. It also offers extra-curricular activities, including 18 clubs and 21 teams in 10 sports.

In addition to a principal an assistant principal and an athletic director, the staff includes one counselor, two technology personnel, and twenty-four teachers. Another 22 people make up their office staff, instructional assistants, cooks, and custodians.

== Notable people ==
- Herman "Suz" Sayger scored 113 points (56 FG, 1 FT) in a 154–10 Culver win against Winamac on March 8, 1913, at Culver, an Indiana state high school all-time record for the most points ever scored in a game.

== See also ==
- List of high schools in Indiana
