= Brems =

Brems may refer to:

- Brems (automobile), Danish brand of the early 20th century
- Brems, Indiana, unincorporated community in the United States
- Else Brems (1908–1995), Danish operatic contralto
- Eva Brems (born 1969), Belgian human rights defender and politician
- Hans Brems (1915–2000), American economist
- Mathias Brems (born 2002), Danish footballer
- Wibke Brems (born 1981), German politician
