= Washington Township, Starke County, Indiana =

Washington Township
- Township
- Location in Starke County
- Coordinates: 41°17′56″N 86°31′19″W
- Country: United States
- State: Indiana
- County: Starke
- Established: 1844

Government
  - Type: Indiana township

Area
  - Total: 36.19 sq mi (93.7 km^{2})
  - Land: 36.13 sq mi (93.6 km^{2})
  - Water: 0.06 sq mi (0.16 km^{2}) 0.17%
- Elevation: 720 ft (220 m)

Population (2020)
  - Total: 2,944
  - Density: 83.1/sq mi (32.1/km^{2})
- Time zone: UTC-6 (Central (CST))
  - Summer (DST): UTC-5 (CDT)
- ZIP codes: 46511, 46531, 46534
- Area code: 574
- GNIS feature ID: 454020

Washington Township is one of nine townships in Starke County, in the U.S. state of Indiana. As of the 2020 census, its population was 2,944 (down from 3,003 at 2010) and it contained 1,214 housing units.

== Geography ==
According to the 2010 census, the township has a total area of 36.19 square miles (93.7 km^{2}), of which 36.13 square miles (93.6 km^{2}) (or 99.83%) is land and 0.06 square miles (0.16 km^{2}) (or 0.17%) is water.

=== Cities, towns, villages ===
- Bass Lake (north edge)

=== Unincorporated towns ===
- Oak Grove at 41.287820°N 86.486121°W
- Ober at 41.270875°N 86.524455°W

(This list is based on USGS data and may include former settlements.)

=== Adjacent townships ===
- Oregon Township (north)
- West Township, Marshall County (east)
- Union Township, Marshall County (southeast)
- North Bend Township (south)
- California Township (southwest)
- Center Township (west)
- Davis Township (northwest)

=== Cemeteries ===
The township contains these two cemeteries: Holy Cross and Swartzell.

=== Lakes ===
- Eagle Lake

=== Major highways ===
- SR 8
- SR 23

== School districts ==
- Knox Community School Corporation

== Political districts ==
- Indiana's 2nd congressional district
- State House District 17
- State Senate District 5
