= Jackson Township, Starke County, Indiana =

Jackson Township
- Township
- Location in Starke County
- Coordinates: 41°17′49″N 86°44′44″W
- Country: United States
- State: Indiana
- County: Starke

Government
  - Type: Indiana township

Area
  - Total: 22.08 sq mi (57.2 km^{2})
  - Land: 22.07 sq mi (57.2 km^{2})
  - Water: 0.01 sq mi (0.026 km^{2}) 0.05%
- Elevation: 666 ft (203 m)

Population (2020)
  - Total: 585
  - Density: 24.9/sq mi (9.6/km^{2})
- Time zone: UTC-6 (Central (CST))
  - Summer (DST): UTC-5 (CDT)
- ZIP codes: 46366, 46534
- Area code: 574
- GNIS feature ID: 453468

Jackson Township is one of nine townships in Starke County, in the U.S. state of Indiana. At the 2020 census, its population was 585 (up from 549 at 2010) and it contained 224 housing units.

== Geography ==
According to the 2010 census, the township has a total area of 22.08 square miles (57.2 km^{2}), of which 22.07 square miles (57.2 km^{2}) (or 99.95%) is land and 0.01 square miles (0.026 km^{2}) (or 0.05%) is water.

=== Adjacent townships ===
- Davis Township (northeast)
- Center Township (east)
- California Township (southeast)
- Wayne Township (south)
- Railroad Township (southwest)
- Dewey Township, LaPorte County (west)
- Prairie Township, LaPorte County (northwest)

=== Major highways ===
- SR 8
- SR 39

== School districts ==
- North Judson-San Pierre School Corporation

== Political districts ==
- Indiana's 2nd congressional district
- State House District 17
- State Senate District 5
