= Hartz Lake, Indiana =

- Census-designated place
- Location within Indiana Location within the United States
- Coordinates: 41°10′35″N 86°29′50″W
- Country: United States
- State: Indiana
- County: Starke
- Township: North Bend

Area
  - Total: 0.462 sq mi (1.20 km^{2})
  - Land: 0.421 sq mi (1.09 km^{2})
  - Water: 0.041 sq mi (0.11 km^{2})
- Elevation: 715 ft (218 m)
- Time zone: UTC-5 (Eastern (EST))
  - Summer (DST): UTC-4 (EDT)
- ZIP code: 46960 (Monterey)
- Area code: 574
- GNIS feature ID: 2830540
- FIPS code: 18-32768

Hartz Lake is an unincorporated community and census-designated place (CDP) in Starke County, Indiana, United States.

== Geography ==
Hartz Lake is in southeastern Starke County, surrounding the natural lake of the same name. It is bordered to the south by Pulaski County. It is 2 miles (3 km) north of Monterey, the mailing address for the community, 7 miles (11 km) southwest of Culver, and 14 miles (23 km) southeast of Knox, the Starke county seat.

According to the U.S. Census Bureau, the Hartz Lake CDP has an area of 0.46 square miles (1.19 km^{2}), of which 0.42 square miles (1.09 km^{2}) are land and 0.04 square miles (0.10 km^{2}), or 8.87%, are water. The lake outlet at its south end drains south to the Tippecanoe River, part of the Wabash River watershed.

== Demographics ==
The United States Census Bureau delineated Hartz Lake as a census designated place in the 2022 American Community Survey.
