= Railroad Township, Starke County, Indiana =

Railroad Township
- Township
- Location in Starke County
- Coordinates: 41°12′59″N 86°51′58″W
- Country: United States
- State: Indiana
- County: Starke

Government
  - Type: Trustee
  - Trustee: Katherine Chaffins
  - Board Members: Joe Krzyzanowski; Jennifer Redlin

Area
  - Total: 36.65 sq mi (94.9 km^{2})
  - Land: 36.61 sq mi (94.8 km^{2})
  - Water: 0.04 sq mi (0.10 km^{2}) 0.11%
- Elevation: 673 ft (205 m)

Population (2020)
  - Total: 1,211
  - Estimate (2024): 1,315 ▲
  - Density: 33.5/sq mi (12.9/km^{2})
- Time zone: UTC-6 (Central (CST))
  - Summer (DST): UTC-5 (CDT)
- ZIP codes: 46366, 46374
- Area code: 219
- GNIS feature ID: 453779

Railroad Township is one of nine townships in Starke County, in the U.S. state of Indiana. As of the 2020 census, its population was 1,211 (down from 1,226 at 2010) and it contained 531 housing units.

== Geography ==
According to the 2010 census, the township has a total area of 36.65 square miles (94.9 km^{2}), of which 36.61 square miles (94.8 km^{2}) (or 99.89%) is land and 0.04 square miles (0.10 km^{2}) (or 0.11%) is water. It is bordered on the north by the Kankakee River.

=== Cities, towns, villages ===
- San Pierre

=== Unincorporated towns ===
- English Lake at 41.265874°N 86.823630°W
- Lomax at 41.258929°N 86.871687°W

(This list is based on USGS data and may include former settlements.)

=== Adjacent townships ===
- Dewey Township, LaPorte County (north)
- Jackson Township (northeast)
- Prairie Township, LaPorte County (northeast)
- Wayne Township (east)
- Rich Grove Township, Pulaski County (southeast)
- Cass Township, Pulaski County (south)
- Walker Township, Jasper County (southwest)
- Kankakee Township, Jasper County (west)
- Pleasant Township, Porter County (northwest)

=== Cemeteries ===
The township contains All Saints Cemetery.

=== Major highways ===
- US 421
- SR 10

== School districts ==
- North Judson-San Pierre School Corporation
- Tri-Township School Corporation
- West Central School Corporation
- Kankakee Valley School Corporation

== Political districts ==
- Indiana's 2nd congressional district
- State House District 17
- State Senate District 5
