= Tepicon Hall =

- U.S. National Register of Historic Places
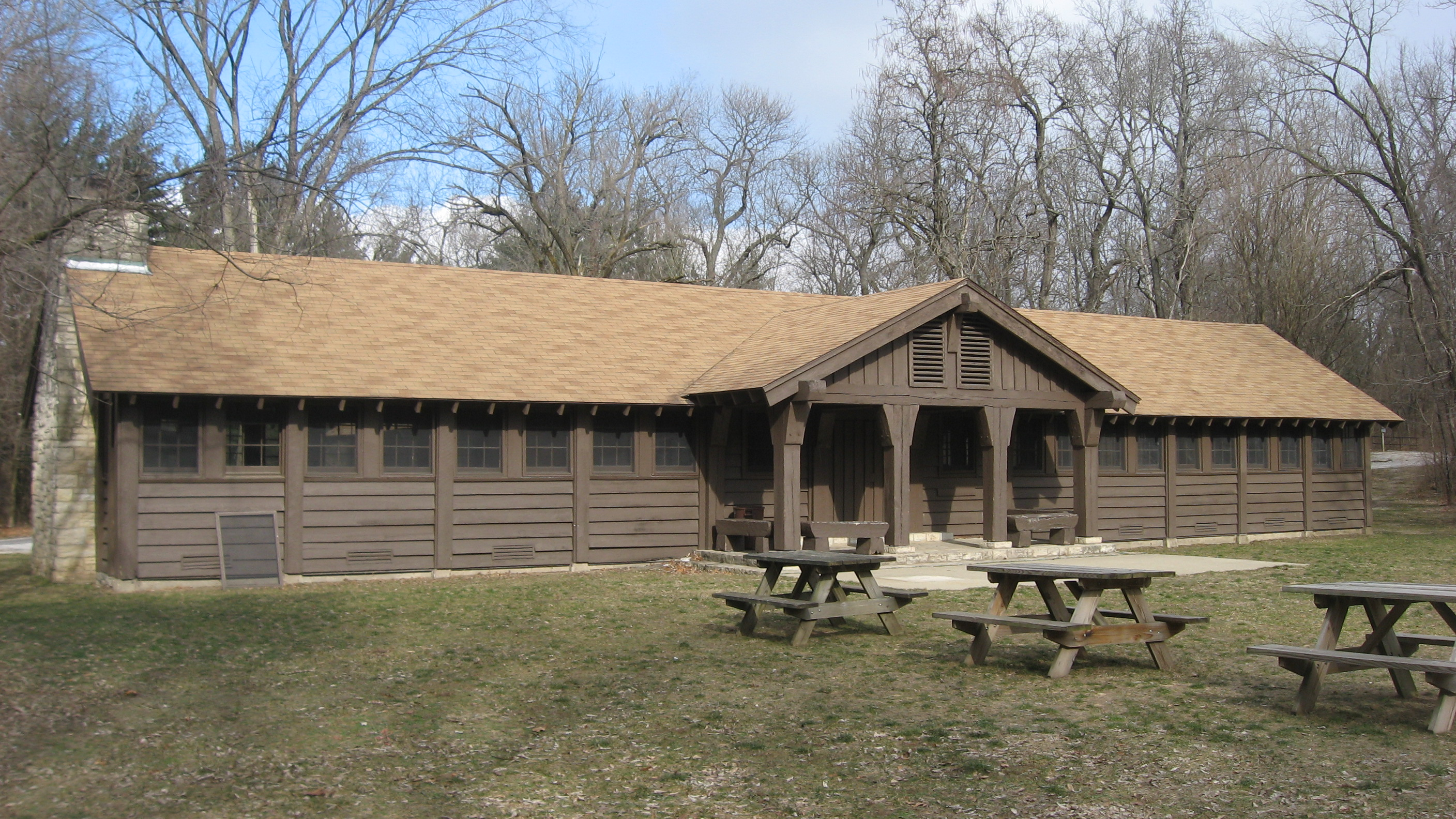
- Tepicon Hall, January 2013

- Location within Indiana Location within the United States
- Location: Tippecanoe River State Park, north of Winamac in Franklin Township, Pulaski County, Indiana
- Coordinates: 41°8′58″N 86°35′38″W
- Area: less than one acre
- Built: c. 1938
- Built by: Works Progress Administration
- Architectural style: NPS Rustic
- MPS: New Deal Resources in Indiana State Parks MPS
- NRHP reference No.: 92000189
- Added to NRHP: April 3, 1992

Tepicon Hall is a historic dining hall located at Tippecanoe River State Park in Franklin Township, Pulaski County, Indiana. It was built about 1938 by the Works Progress Administration and is nearly all that remains of Camp Tepicon. It is a one-story, T-shaped, rustic timber-frame building with a gable roof. It is sheathed in clapboard siding and board-and-batten siding on the gable ends.

It was listed on the National Register of Historic Places in 1992.
