= Beardstown =

Beardstown may refer to:

- Beardstown, Illinois
- Beardstown Township, Cass County, Illinois
- Beardstown, Indiana
- Beardstown, Tennessee
