= Oregon Township, Indiana =

Oregon Township is the name of two townships in Indiana:

- Oregon Township, Clark County, Indiana
- Oregon Township, Starke County, Indiana
