= Franklin Township, Pulaski County, Indiana =

Township in Pulaski County, Indiana, United States

Franklin Township
- Township
- Location in Pulaski County
- Coordinates: 41°07′39″N 86°38′27″W
- Country: United States
- State: Indiana
- County: Pulaski

Government
  - Type: Indiana township

Area
  - Total: 36.38 sq mi (94.2 km^{2})
  - Land: 36.38 sq mi (94.2 km^{2})
  - Water: 0 sq mi (0 km^{2}) 0%
- Elevation: 719 ft (219 m)

Population (2020)
  - Total: 715
  - Density: 19.7/sq mi (7.59/km^{2})
- ZIP codes: 46960, 46996
- GNIS feature ID: 453311

Franklin Township is one of twelve townships in Pulaski County, Indiana, United States. As of the 2020 census, its population was 715 and it contained 296 housing units.

Historical population
Census	Pop.	Note	%±
1890	462		—
1900	643		39.2%
1910	697		8.4%
1920	697		0.0%
1930	514		−26.3%
1940	583		13.4%
1950	573		−1.7%
1960	637		11.2%
1970	578		−9.3%
1980	644		11.4%
1990	637		−1.1%
2000	698		9.6%
2010	715		2.4%
2020	715		0.0%
Source: US Decennial Census

== History ==
Franklin Township was organized in 1855, and named after Franklin Township, Ripley County, Indiana, the native home of an early settler.

Tepicon Hall at Tippecanoe River State Park was listed on the National Register of Historic Places in 1992.

== Geography ==
According to the 2010 census, the township has a total area of 36.38 square miles (94.2 km^{2}), all land.

=== Unincorporated towns ===
- Beardstown at 41.138097°N 86.602511°W
- Ripley at 41.100596°N 86.66029°W

(This list is based on USGS data and may include former settlements.)

=== Adjacent townships ===
- California Township, Starke County (north)
- North Bend Township, Starke County (northeast)
- Tippecanoe Township (east)
- Monroe Township (south)
- Jefferson Township (southwest)
- Rich Grove Township (west)
- Wayne Township, Starke County (northwest)

=== Cemeteries ===
The township contains Mt. Zion Cemetery.

=== Major highways ===
- U.S. Route 35

=== Airports and landing strips ===
- Arens Field
- Graves Landing Strip
- Podell Airport

=== Landmarks ===
- Tippecanoe River State Park (northwest three-quarters)

Potowatami Indian Dam (located just up from the state park landing in the Tippecanoe River).

Winamac Fish & Wildlife Area (containing the Paddi-Hank Sandhills)

Haschel Ridge -part of the old Paddi–Hank Sandhills

Firetower (located in the state park)

Bunker Hill -most prominent of the County

Hilljack Hill

Oxbow Lagoon (Tippy SP).

Dead Bayou (located approximately 1/4 mile north of the state park boat landing merging with the river on the east side).

The Headquarters -South Beardstown.

== Education ==
- Eastern Pulaski Community School Corporation

Franklin Township residents may obtain a free library card from the Pulaski County Public Library in Winamac.

== Political districts ==
- Indiana's 2nd congressional district
- State House District 20
- State Senate District 5
