= Davis Township, Starke County, Indiana =

Davis Township
- Township
- Location in Starke County
- Coordinates: 41°23′11″N 86°38′42″W
- Country: United States
- State: Indiana
- County: Starke
- Established: 1859

Government
  - Type: Indiana township

Area
  - Total: 35.98 sq mi (93.2 km^{2})
  - Land: 35.89 sq mi (93.0 km^{2})
  - Water: 0.09 sq mi (0.23 km^{2}) 0.25%
- Elevation: 673 ft (205 m)

Population (2020)
  - Total: 1,002
  - Density: 29.1/sq mi (11.2/km^{2})
- Time zone: UTC-6 (Central (CST))
  - Summer (DST): UTC-5 (CDT)
- ZIP codes: 46532, 46534
- Area code: 574
- GNIS feature ID: 453254

Davis Township is one of nine townships in Starke County, in the U.S. state of Indiana. As of the 2020 census, its population was 1,002 (down from 1,043 at 2010) and it contained 421 housing units.

== Geography ==
According to the 2010 census, the township has a total area of 35.98 square miles (93.2 km^{2}), of which 35.89 square miles (93.0 km^{2}) (or 99.75%) is land and 0.09 square miles (0.23 km^{2}) (or 0.25%) is water.

=== Cities, towns, villages ===
- Hamlet (west half)

=== Adjacent townships ===
- Union Township, LaPorte County (north)
- Johnson Township, LaPorte County (northeast)
- Oregon Township (east)
- Washington Township (southeast)
- Center Township (south)
- Jackson Township (southwest)
- Hanna Township, LaPorte County (west)
- Prairie Township, LaPorte County (west)

=== Major highways ===
- US 30
- US 35

=== Airports and landing strips ===
- Singletons Landing Strip

== School districts ==
- Oregon-Davis School Corporation

== Political districts ==
- Indiana's 2nd congressional district
- State House District 17
- State Senate District 5
