= Koontz Lake, Indiana =

- Census-designated place
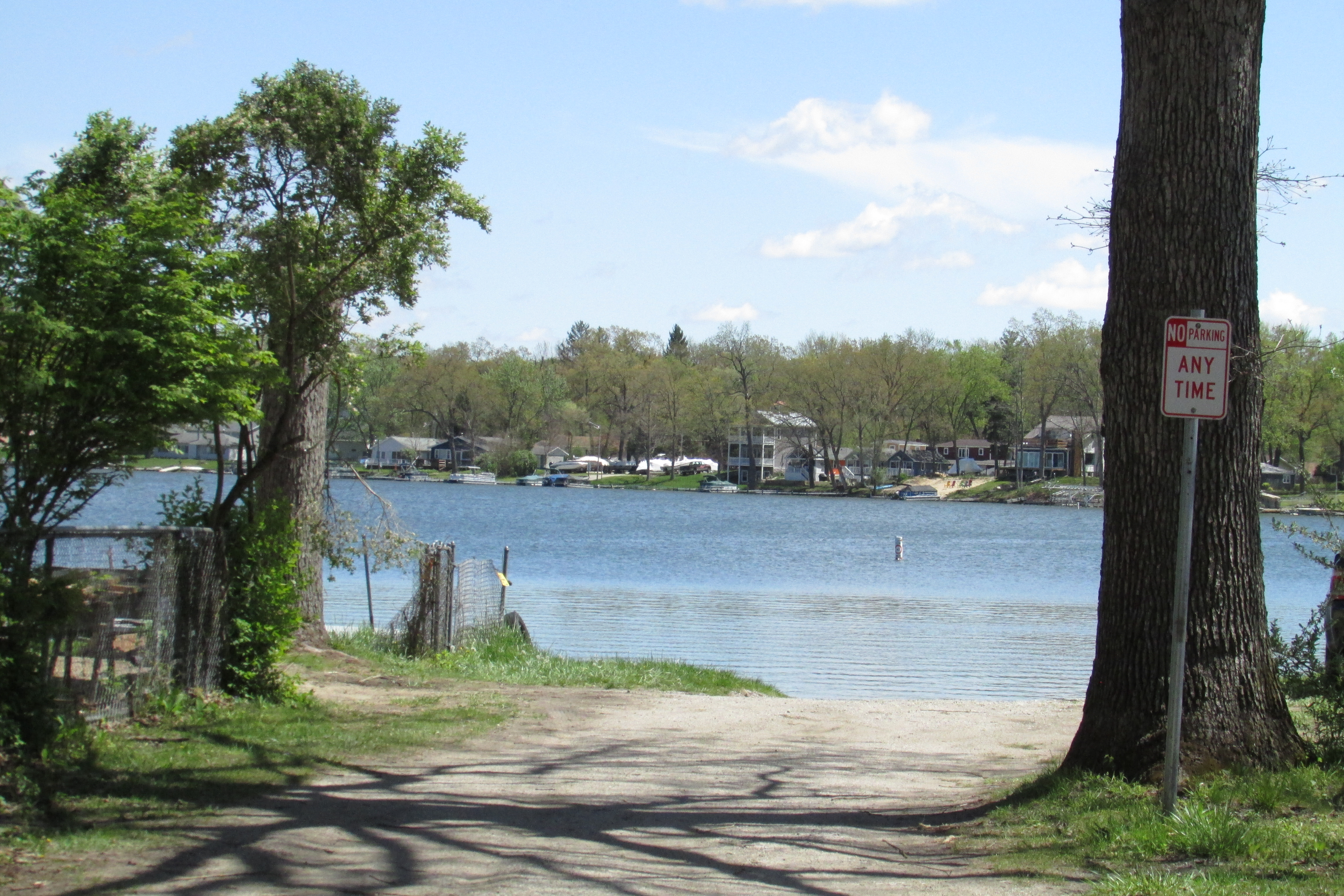

- Location in Marshall County and Starke County, Indiana
- Coordinates: 41°24′50″N 86°29′37″W
- Country: United States
- State: Indiana
- Counties: Starke, Marshall
- Township: Oregon, Polk

Area
  - Total: 4.05 sq mi (10.5 km^{2})
  - Land: 3.52 sq mi (9.1 km^{2})
  - Water: 0.52 sq mi (1.3 km^{2})
- Elevation: 715 ft (218 m)

Population (2020)
  - Total: 1,667
  - Density: 473/sq mi (183/km^{2})
- Time zone: UTC-6 Starke County Portion, -5 Marshall County Portion (CSTStarke County Portion,ESTMarshall County Portion)
  - Summer (DST): UTC-5 Starke County Portion, -4 Marshall County Portion (CDT, EDT)
- ZIP code: 46574 (Walkerton)
- FIPS code: 18-40464
- GNIS feature ID: 2393071

Koontz Lake is an unincorporated community and census-designated place in Starke and Marshall counties in Indiana. The population was 1,667 at the 2020 census.

== History ==
Koontz Lake was named for the lake which the community surrounds, which in turn was named after local mill owner Samuel Koontz. The community was devastated by tornadoes as part of the Palm Sunday Tornado Outbreak of 1965.

== Geography ==
Koontz Lake is located in the northeast corner of Starke County. The east end of the lake and of the CDP are in western Marshall County. St. Joseph County borders the CDP to the north. Indiana State Road 23 passes through the community on the west side of the lake, leading north 4 miles (6 km) to Walkerton, the post office for Koontz Lake addresses, and south the same distance to U.S. Route 30 in Grovertown.

According to the United States Census Bureau, the CDP has a total area of 4.0 square miles (10 km^{2}), of which 3.5 square miles (9.1 km^{2}) are land and 0.5 square miles (1.3 km^{2}), or 12.90%, are water. The outlet of the lake is at its west end, into Robbins Ditch, which flows west to the Kankakee River, a tributary of the Illinois River.

== Demographics ==
Historical population
Census	Pop.	Note	%±
1980	1,436		—
1990	1,615		12.5%
2000	1,554		−3.8%
2010	1,559		0.3%
2020	1,667		6.9%
U.S. Decennial Census

=== 2020 census ===
As of the 2020 census, Koontz Lake had a population of 1,667. The median age was 44.4 years. 20.9% of residents were under the age of 18 and 20.3% were 65 years of age or older. For every 100 females, there were 103.8 males, and for every 100 females age 18 and over, there were 103.5 males.

0.0% of residents lived in urban areas, while 100.0% lived in rural areas.

There were 713 households in Koontz Lake, of which 23.8% had children under the age of 18 living in them. Of all households, 49.4% were married-couple households, 18.9% were households with a male householder and no spouse or partner present, and 22.3% were households with a female householder and no spouse or partner present. About 27.9% of all households were made up of individuals, and 13.2% had someone living alone who was 65 years of age or older.

There were 1,015 housing units, of which 29.8% were vacant. The homeowner vacancy rate was 2.4% and the rental vacancy rate was 0.7%.

Racial composition as of the 2020 census
Race	Number	Percent
White	1,540	92.4%
Black or African American	1	0.1%
American Indian and Alaska Native	12	0.7%
Asian	7	0.4%
Native Hawaiian and Other Pacific Islander	0	0.0%
Some other race	15	0.9%
Two or more races	92	5.5%
Hispanic or Latino (of any race)	54	3.2%

=== 2000 census ===
As of the 2000 census, there were 1,554 people, 652 households, and 449 families residing in the CDP. The population density was 459.1 inhabitants per square mile (177.3/km^{2}). There were 931 housing units at an average density of 275.0 per square mile (106.2/km^{2}). The racial makeup of the CDP was 97.75% White, 0.13% African American, 0.58% Native American, 0.58% from other races, and 0.97% from two or more races. Hispanic or Latino of any race were 1.74% of the population.

There were 652 households, out of which 26.7% had children under the age of 18 living with them, 56.6% were married couples living together, 8.4% had a female householder with no husband present, and 31.0% were non-families. 26.5% of all households were made up of individuals, and 13.3% had someone living alone who was 65 years of age or older. The average household size was 2.38 and the average family size was 2.85.

In the CDP, the population was spread out, with 21.6% under the age of 18, 7.7% from 18 to 24, 25.7% from 25 to 44, 27.0% from 45 to 64, and 18.0% who were 65 years of age or older. The median age was 41 years. For every 100 females, there were 93.8 males. For every 100 females age 18 and over, there were 94.1 males.

The median income for a household in the CDP was $37,137, and the median income for a family was $45,114. Males had a median income of $35,388 versus $21,563 for females. The per capita income for the CDP was $21,429. About 6.7% of families and 7.7% of the population were below the poverty line, including 11.5% of those under age 18 and 5.7% of those age 65 or over.

== Education ==
Koontz Lake has a public library, a branch of the Starke County Public Library System.
