= Toto, Indiana =

- Unincorporated community
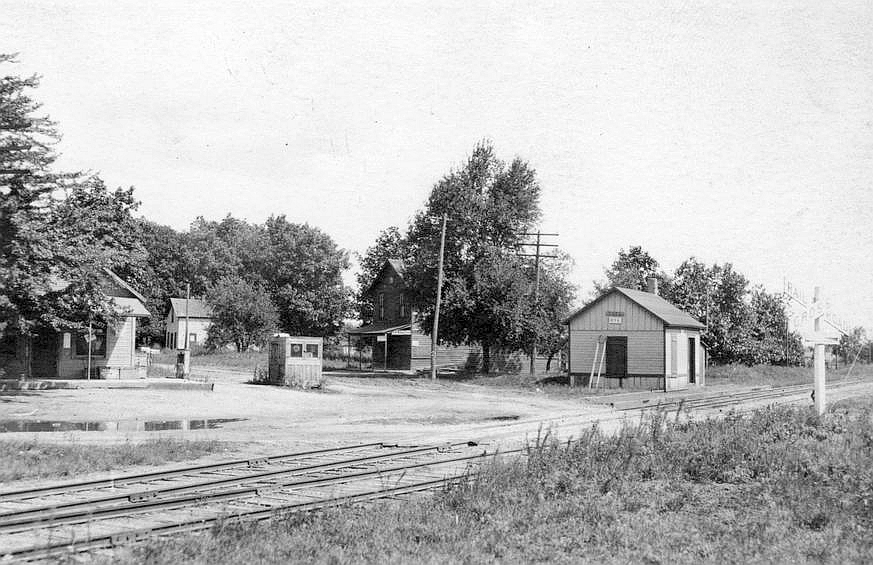
- Depot in Toto, 1915

- Location within Indiana Location within the United States
- Coordinates: 41°15′33″N 86°41′54″W
- Country: United States
- State: Indiana
- County: Starke
- Township: Center
- Elevation: 709 ft (216 m)
- Time zone: UTC-6 (Central (CST))
  - Summer (DST): UTC-5 (CDT)
- ZIP code: 46534
- Area code: 574
- GNIS feature ID: 444820

Toto is an unincorporated community in Center Township, Starke County, in the U.S. state of Indiana.

== History ==
Toto was first established in 1855, after the Toto Post Office opened. However, sometime shortly after the 1900s, the Chicago, Indiana and Southern Railroad (NYC) decided to call the depot here Rye. Some believed that Rye was north of the tracks as was the depot, and Toto was south of the tracks. Toto was the only mapped area after 1920. The origin of the name Toto is obscure, but it could possibly be of Native American origin.

In 1897, a one-room school was built for $400 on the west side of Range Road, about a block north of Toto Road. The Toto School was closed in the early 1920s.

Toto Post Office was discontinued in 1907.

Toto has a local reputation for an abundance of curio stores, giving it the moniker "Indiana's Bargain Capital".

Toto has also been recognized for being the inspiration for the name of Dorothy's dog, Toto, in the Wizard of Oz books by L. Frank Baum, who resided for a time at nearby Bass Lake.
