= Lawton, Indiana =

- Unincorporated community
- Location within Indiana Location within the United States
- Coordinates: 41°05′59″N 86°31′30″W
- Country: United States
- State: Indiana
- County: Pulaski
- Township: Tippecanoe
- Elevation: 715 ft (218 m)
- Time zone: UTC-5 (Eastern (EST))
  - Summer (DST): UTC-4 (EDT)
- ZIP code: 46996
- GNIS feature ID: 437679

Lawton is an unincorporated community in Tippecanoe Township, Pulaski County, in the U.S. state of Indiana.

== History ==
A post office was established at Lawton in 1902, and remained in operation until it was discontinued in 1906.
