= Ripley, Indiana =

- Unincorporated community
- Location within Indiana Location within the United States
- Coordinates: 41°06′02″N 86°39′37″W
- Country: United States
- State: Indiana
- County: Pulaski
- Township: Franklin
- Elevation: 709 ft (216 m)
- Time zone: UTC-5 (Eastern (EST))
  - Summer (DST): UTC-4 (EDT)
- ZIP code: 46996
- GNIS feature ID: 442056

Ripley is an unincorporated community in Franklin Township, Pulaski County, in the U.S. state of Indiana.

== History ==
Ripley was founded in 1900.
