= Aldine, Indiana =

- Unincorporated community
- Location within Indiana Location within the United States
- Coordinates: 41°12′03″N 86°40′28″W
- Country: United States
- State: Indiana
- County: Starke
- Township: California
- Elevation: 712 ft (217 m)
- Time zone: UTC-6 (Central (CST))
  - Summer (DST): UTC-5 (CDT)
- ZIP code: 46366
- Area code: 574
- GNIS feature ID: 430054

Aldine (or Alldine) is an unincorporated community in California Township, Starke County, in the U.S. state of Indiana.

== History ==
A post office was established at Aldine in 1883, and remained in operation until it was discontinued in 1919.

In 1890, the population was 25 residents. In 1900, the population was also 25. By 1920, the population was 53.
