= Center Township, Starke County, Indiana =

Center Township
- Township
- Location in Starke County
- Coordinates: 41°18′11″N 86°38′20″W
- Country: United States
- State: Indiana
- County: Starke

Government
  - Type: Indiana township

Area
  - Total: 36.34 sq mi (94.1 km^{2})
  - Land: 36.34 sq mi (94.1 km^{2})
  - Water: 0 sq mi (0 km^{2}) 0%
- Elevation: 696 ft (212 m)

Population (2020)
  - Total: 6,131
  - Density: 171.4/sq mi (66.2/km^{2})
- Time zone: UTC-6 (Central (CST))
  - Summer (DST): UTC-5 (CDT)
- ZIP code: 46534
- Area code: 574
- GNIS feature ID: 453193

Center Township is one of nine townships in Starke County, in the U.S. state of Indiana. As of the 2020 census, its population was 6,131 (down from 6,229 at 2010) and it contained 2,371 housing units.

== Geography ==
According to the 2010 census, the township has a total area of 36.34 square miles (94.1 km^{2}), all land.

=== Cities, towns, villages ===
- Knox (the county seat)

=== Unincorporated towns ===
- Brems at 41.339208°N 86.697517°W
- Indian Hill at 41.32532°N 86.68335°W
- Toto at 41.259485°N 86.698071°W

(This list is based on USGS data and may include former settlements.)

=== Adjacent townships ===
- Davis Township (north)
- Oregon Township (northeast)
- Washington Township (east)
- North Bend Township (southeast)
- California Township (south)
- Wayne Township (southwest)
- Jackson Township (west)

=== Cemeteries ===
The township contains these three cemeteries: Crown Hill, Oak Grove and Oak Park.

=== Major highways ===
- US 35
- SR 8

=== Airports and landing strips ===
- Starke County Airport
- Wilson Airport

=== Landmarks ===
- Wythougan Park

== School districts ==
- Knox Community School Corporation

== Political districts ==
- Indiana's 2nd congressional district
- State House District 17
- State Senate District 5
