= Lena Park, Indiana =

- Location within Indiana Location within the United States
- Coordinates: 41°11′40″N 86°43′03″W
- Country: United States
- State: Indiana
- County: Starke
- Township: Wayne
- Elevation: 712 ft (217 m)
- Time zone: UTC-6 (Central (CST))
  - Summer (DST): UTC-5 (CDT)
- ZIP code: 46366
- Area code: 574
- GNIS feature ID: 446765

Lena Park is a place name in Wayne Township, Starke County, in the U.S. state of Indiana, which refers to a failed real estate development in the area in the early 20th century.

== History ==
From 1909 to 1911, Lena Park was the site of a fraudulent real estate development which lured people to Indiana farmland about 60 miles from Chicago to sell them lots in what was promised to be a new manufacturing center similar to the success of Gary, Indiana. Though the scheme collapsed, some people did move to the area, to which the name "Lena Park" was still applied.

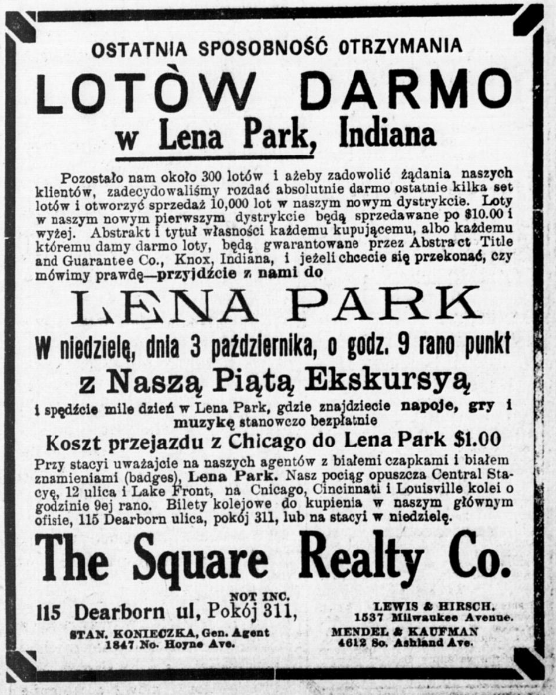
October 1, 1909 advertisement for Lena Park in Chicago Polish-language newspaper Dziennik Chicagoski

The scheme included providing free train rides every weekend from Chicago to prospective buyers, many of whom were recent immigrants from eastern Europe. A train station was built just for the alleged prospective development. The promoters claimed that a number of manufacturing companies would be opening in the development soon. Though the farmland was only worth perhaps $80 an acre, buyers were paying at a much higher price for small subdivided lots.

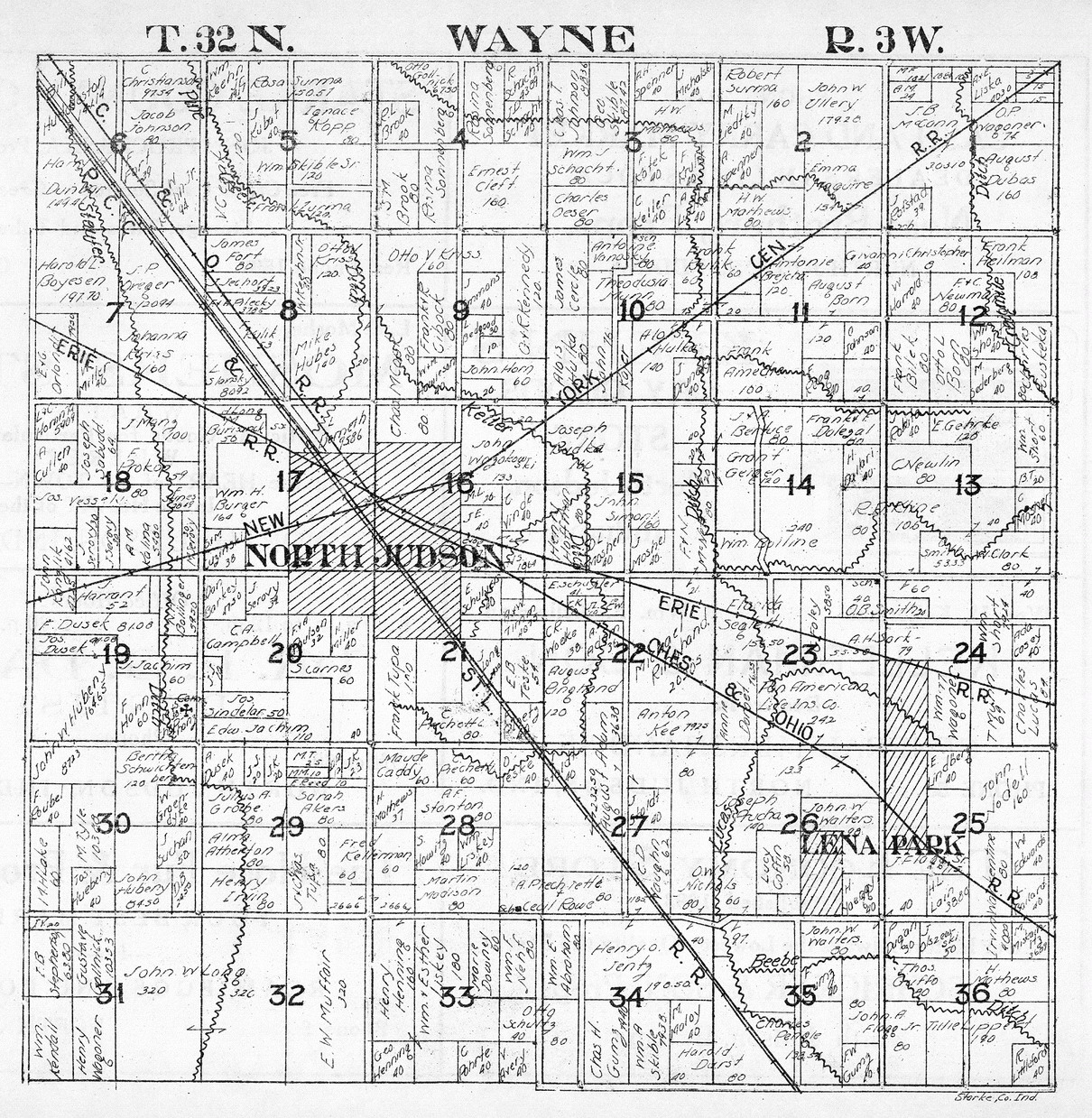
Lena Park portions still extant on bottom right portion of 1925 Wayne Township map.

A glass factory did locate in the development, but it moved away to Michigan in July 1911. The scheme completely collapsed by September 1911 when a receiver was appointed. In February 1912, the auditor of the county issued an advertisement to sell 1,500 lots in Lena Park for delinquent taxes.

== Legacy ==
Some people did locate to the area, however, and the name "Lena Park" is occasionally still used to refer to the area. A 1929 newspaper report described it as a "settlement on the C. & O. railroad near North Judson, ten miles southwest of Knox. It was a promotion scheme backed by Chicago interests. The plan fell through and houses in the locality are occupied mostly by Chicago foreigners." It appeared on maps for some time; a 1925 Wayne Township map still has "Lena Park" identified on it, but by 1949 a township map merely shows the remaining vestiges of Lena Park as "platted" sections of the township.
