= Winamac Fish and Wildlife Area =

Protected area in Indiana

- IUCN category IV (habitat/species management area)
- Location within Indiana
- Location: Pulaski County, Indiana, United States
- Nearest city: Kingsbury, IN
- Coordinates: 41.116983°N 86.604183°W
- Area: 4,770 acres (19.3 km^{2})
- Established: 1943
- Governing body: Indiana Department of Natural Resources
- Website: www.in.gov/dnr/fishwild/3079.htm

Winamac Fish and Wildlife Area is a protected area dedicated to providing hunting and fishing opportunities while maintaining 4,770 acres (1,930 ha) of oak forest and upland fields. It is located on U.S. Route 35, north of Winamac, Indiana.

In the 1930s the U.S. Department of the Interior purchased 6,454 acres (2,612 ha) of marginal farm land along the Tippecanoe River. The land was developed as a recreation demonstration area. In 1943 the property given to the State of Indiana as Tippecanoe River State Park. In 1959 the 3,720 acres (1,510 ha) moved to the Division of Fish and Game.

== Facilities ==
- Wildlife Viewing
- Ice Fishing
- Hunting
- Trapping
- Shooting Range
- Archery Range
- Dog Training Area
