= San Pierre, Indiana =

- Census-designated place
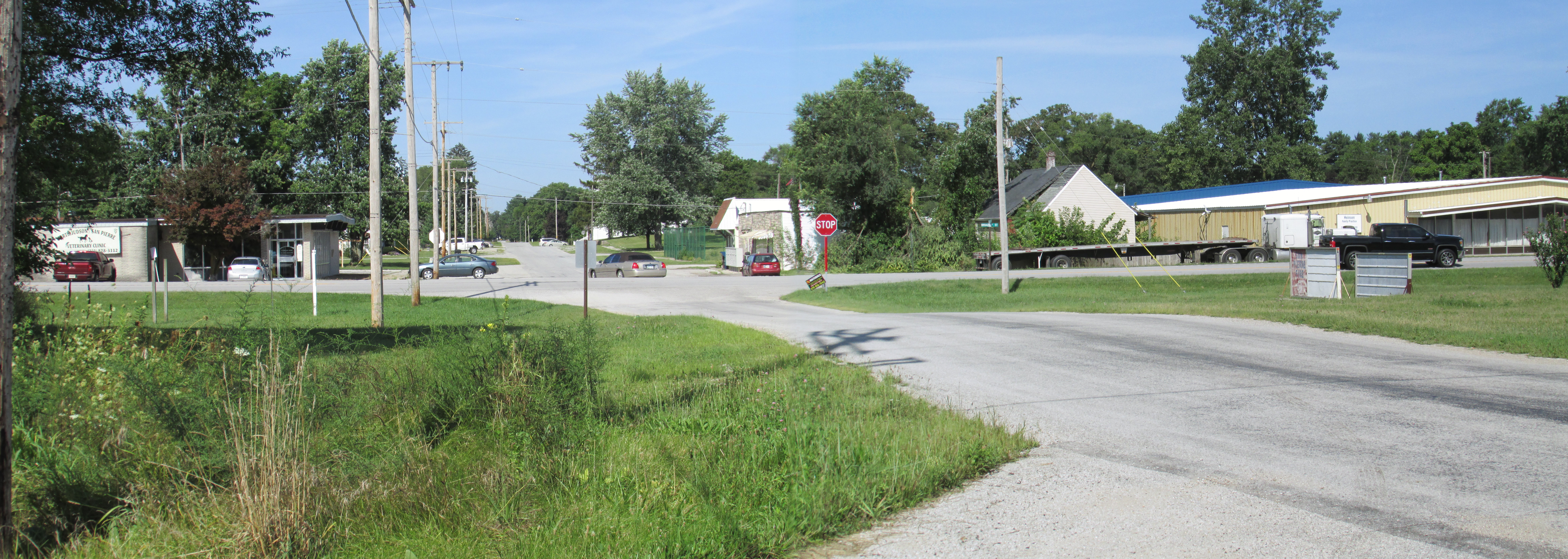
- Junction of Eliza St/San Pierre Rd and U.S. 421/SR 10 taken from Fisher St in 2021

- Location of San Pierre in Starke County, Indiana.
- Coordinates: 41°11′57″N 86°53′27″W
- Country: United States
- State: Indiana
- County: Starke
- Township: Railroad

Area
  - Total: 0.62 sq mi (1.6 km^{2})
  - Land: 0.62 sq mi (1.6 km^{2})
  - Water: 0 sq mi (0.00 km^{2})
- Elevation: 702 ft (214 m)

Population (2020)
  - Total: 153
  - Estimate (2024): 727 ▲
  - Density: 250/sq mi (96/km^{2})
- Time zone: UTC-6 (Central (CST))
  - Summer (DST): UTC-5 (CDT)
- ZIP code: 46374
- Area code: 219
- FIPS code: 18-68004
- GNIS feature ID: 2393222

San Pierre is a census-designated place (CDP) in Railroad Township, Starke County, in the U.S. state of Indiana. As of the 2020 census, San Pierre had a population of 153.

== History ==
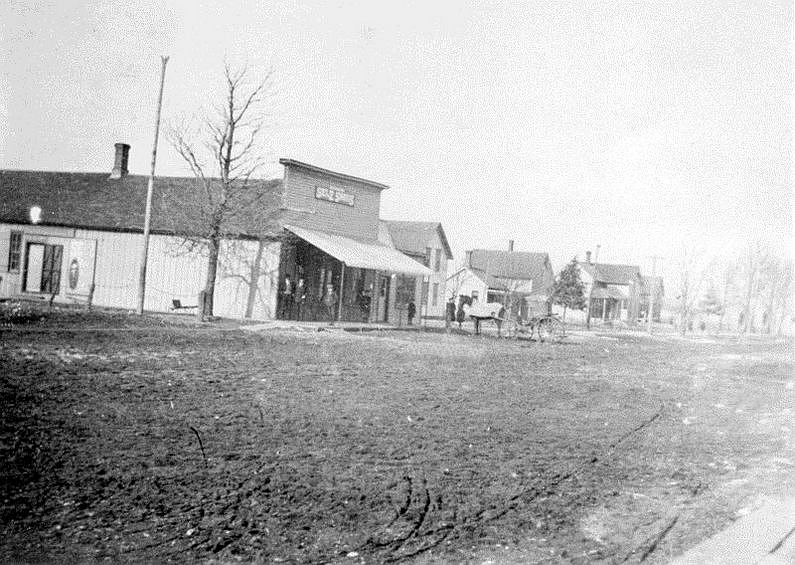
San Pierre, 1880s

=== Establishment ===
The area now known as San Pierre was originally known as Culvertown, just north of the current town. However, in 1853, a post office was established in the area as the River Post Office. San Pierre proper was laid out in 1854, and the post office was re-established as San Pierre under postmaster Amas Green in 1855.

According to one local tradition, the village later took the name of San Pierre, named after a nearby French-Canadian saloon owner. The story goes that 'Pierre' built a shack some 400 feet south of the village of Culvertown and began to sell whisky there. As a consequence of this inducement, the town shifted slightly to the south and the name was changed to San Pierre. Another tradition records the village being named after a French railroad worker called 'Pierre', with San being added to provide more importance to the name. In any case, the name was changed simply to Pierre in 1894, possibly as a result of increasing tension between Spain and the United States, leading up to the Spanish–American War. Finally the name was changed back to San Pierre in 1899.

=== Railroads ===
The first railroad to be laid in Starke County, New Albany and Chicago (Monon), was laid through San Pierre (then Culvertown) in 1853. Indiana, Illinois and Iowa Railroad (New York Central) was built through San Pierre to the neighboring town of North Judson in 1881. On May 1, 1875, President Abraham Lincoln’s funeral train had a stop in San Pierre on its way to Springfield, Illinois.

=== Schools ===
San Pierre Public School was established in 1902 on W. Eliza Street. In 1914, all one-room, rural schoolhouses in Railroad Township consolidated into the San Pierre Public School. The brick schoolhouse suffered a fire sometime between 1921 and 1923; the school was rebuilt across the street. In 1961, an elementary school and gymnasium was dedicated, and the schoolhouse on W. Eliza Street became the San Pierre High School. San Pierre High School closed after graduating its last class in 1964 and consolidating with North Judson High School to create North Judson-San Pierre (NJSP) High School. NJSP School Corporation continued the kindergarten program in San Pierre on the corner of Jackson and Ann Street until the early 2010s when the kindergarten program was moved into NJSP Liberty Elementary.

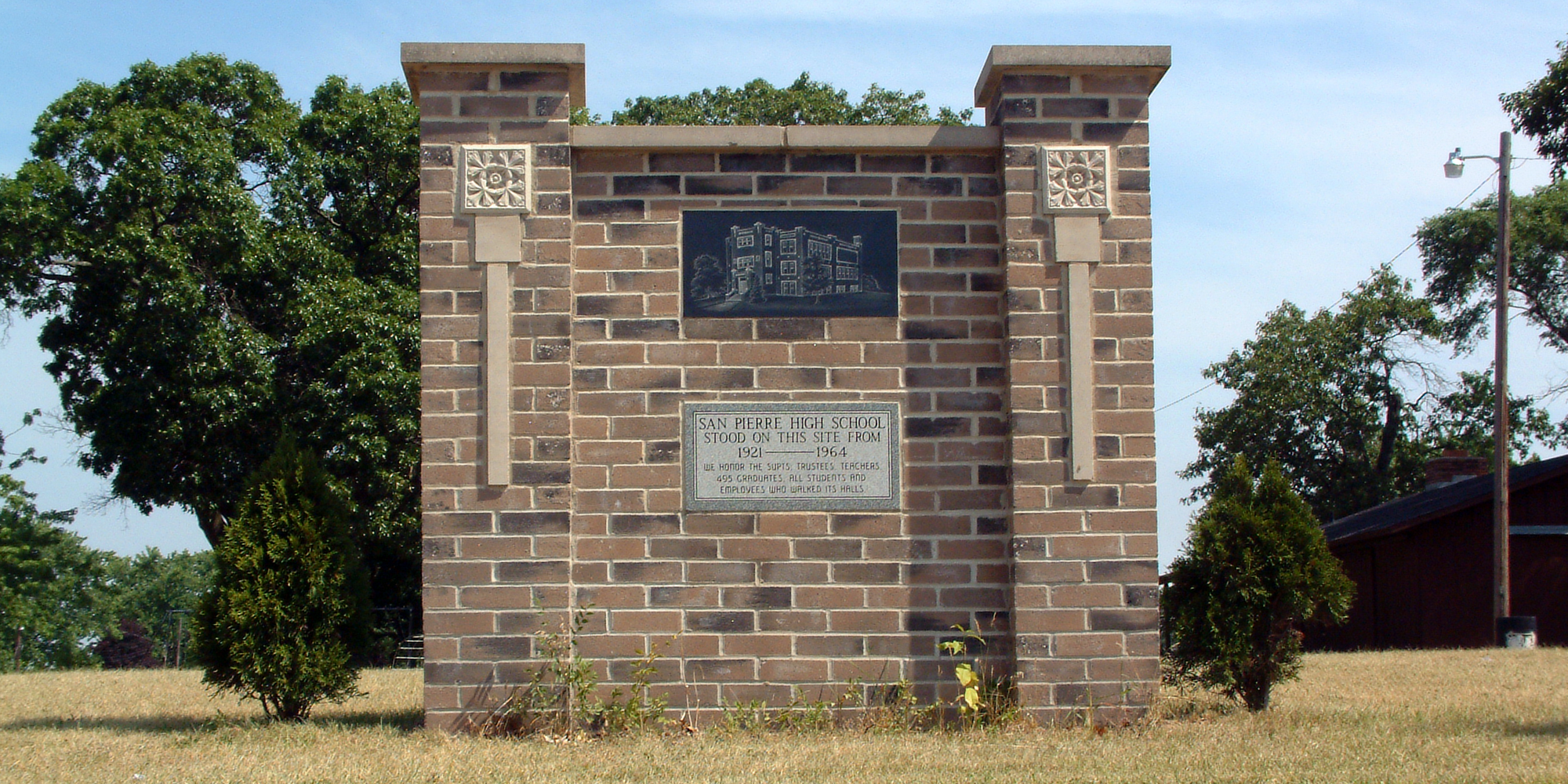
The site of former San Pierre High School in 2007. The inscription reads: San Pierre High School stood on this site from 1921 – 1964. We honor the supts, trustees, teachers, 495 graduates, all students and employees who walked its halls.

=== Churches ===
In the 1880s, San Pierre established the Evangelical Union Church. The name later changed to Evangelical Union Brethren in 1946 before dissolving in 1967. In 1886, All Saint's Catholic Church was organized; it remains open and now stands where the first public school of San Pierre once stood. In 1891, St. Luke Evangelical Church was established in San Pierre and still operates today as St Luke United Church of Christ.

=== Other history ===
The town briefly had a Grand Army of the Republic Post (John W. McCune Post #587) from 1891 before closing in 1901. The Little Company of St. Mary's, later Our Lady of Holy Cross Health Care Center, was opened in 1945 and stayed in operation until 2008 before being torn down sometime between June 2009 and August 2010. The site was later dedicated as Tierney Park in September 2017.

== Geography ==
San Pierre is located in the Northwest/North Central region of Indiana. Located in the southwest corner of Starke County, San Pierre is approximately 2 miles (3.2 km) east of Jasper County, 2 miles (3.2 km) north of Pulaski County, and 6 miles (9.7 km) south of LaPorte County. San Pierre is approximately 60 miles (97 km) southeast of Chicago; and 105 miles (169 km) northwest of Indianapolis.

The junction of U.S. Route 421 and Indiana State Road 10 is located in San Pierre.

According to the United States Census Bureau, San Pierre (CDP) encompasses a total area of 0.598 square miles (1.55 km^{2}), of which it is all land. San Pierre (46374) encompasses a total area of 34.84 square miles (90.2 km^{2}), of which 34.76 square miles (90.0 km^{2}) is land and 0.08 square miles (0.21 km^{2}) is water.

San Pierre is located in the former Grand Kankakee Marsh. Now the Kankakee Outwash Plain, a till plain region of the Central Corn Belt, the Grand Kankakee Marsh was the largest U.S. freshwater marsh before it was drained. The marsh was formed by the Laurentide ice sheet during the Wisconsin glaciation between 75,000 and 11,000 years ago. Today, San Pierre is approximately 6 miles (9.7 km) south of the Kankakee River, and the land is primarily farmland with a sand/loamy sand soil texture.

== Demographics ==
Historical population
Census	Pop.	Note	%±
2000	156		—
2010	144		−7.7%
2020	153		6.3%
2024 (est.)	727	▲	375.2%
U.S. Decennial Census

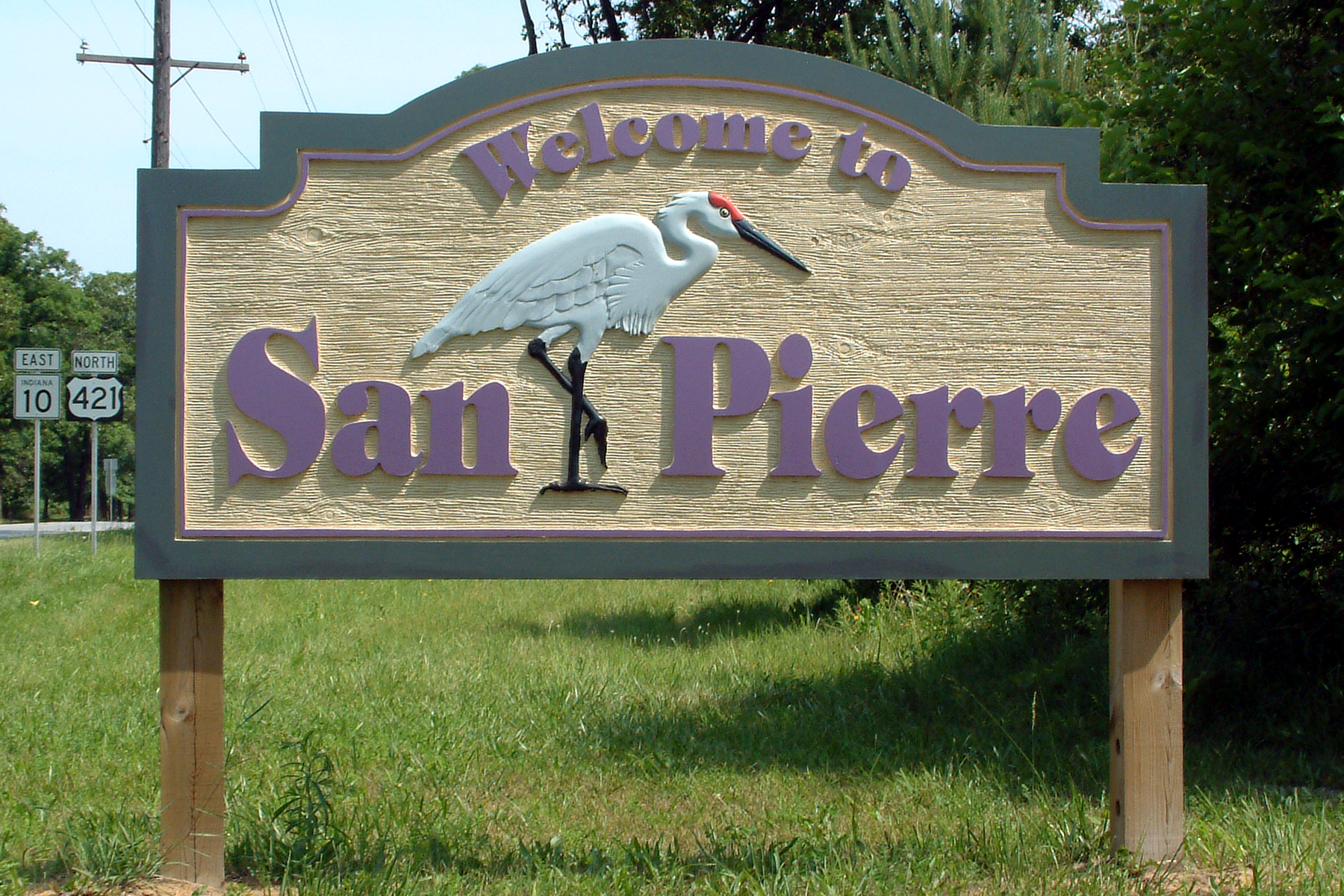
Welcome sign near the junction of U.S. Route 421 and Indiana State Road 10

As of the census of 2020, there were 153 people and 69 households in the CDP. The population density was 1,020.0 inhabitants per square mile (393.8/km^{2}). There were 69 housing units at an average density of 177.6 per square mile (68.6/km^{2}). The racial makeup of the CDP was 84.3% White, 1.3% Black or African American, 3.9% from other races, and 10.5% from two or more races. Hispanic or Latino of any race were 8.5% of the population.

There were 69 households, out of which 29.0% had children under the age of 18 living with them, 66.7% were married couples living together, 20.3% had a female householder with no husband present, and 8.70% had someone living alone who was 65 years of age or older. The average household size was 4.07 and the average family size was 4.48.

In the CDP, 3.9% of residents were living with non-relatives. 49.0% of the population were male and were 51.0% female. The population age was spread out, with 22.9% between the ages of 0 and 19, 10.5% from 20 to 29, 18.3% from 30 to 44, 26.8% from 45 to 64, and 21.6% who were 65 years of age or older. The median age was 44.5 years (females: 42.5; males: 50.5).

The median income for a household in the CDP was $115,625, and the median income for a family was $100,000. None of the population or families were below the poverty line.

== Sandhill Cranes ==
Due to its closeness to the Jasper-Pulaski Fish and Wildlife Area, each year San Pierre and the surrounding vicinity is briefly home to more than 10,000 of the sandhill crane species of bird during their fall migration. The bird has become so synonymous with the town that it has become an unofficial emblem of the community, including a depiction on the welcome sign.

== Tierney Park ==
Tierney Park sits on the former location of Our Lady of Holy Cross Health Care Center (Little Company of St. Mary's). The park was named after John Tierney who stowed away on President Abraham Lincoln's funeral train from San Pierre to Springfield, IL to attend Lincoln's funeral service. Years later, Tierney ultimately donated the land that would become the St. Mary's campus in 1945 until its closure and demolition by 2010. In September 2017, Tierney Park was dedicated and a marker for Lincoln's funeral train at the location was unveiled.

== Education ==
San Pierre has a public library, a branch of the Starke County Public Library System.

San Pierre is included in the North Judson-San Pierre School Corporation, located in North Judson.

== Churches ==
- Abundant Life Church (205 N. Jackson Street)
- All Saints Catholic Church (205 W. Eliza Street)
- Saint Luke United Church of Christ (302 W. Eliza Street)
- Shiloh Assembly of God Church (10501 State Road 10)
