= Wayne Township, Starke County, Indiana =

Wayne Township
- Township
- Location in Starke County
- Coordinates: 41°12′56″N 86°45′22″W
- Country: United States
- State: Indiana
- County: Starke

Government
  - Type: Indiana township

Area
  - Total: 36.37 sq mi (94.2 km^{2})
  - Land: 36.31 sq mi (94.0 km^{2})
  - Water: 0.06 sq mi (0.16 km^{2}) 0.16%
- Elevation: 692 ft (211 m)

Population (2020)
  - Total: 4,609
  - Density: 125/sq mi (48/km^{2})
- Time zone: UTC-6 (Central (CST))
  - Summer (DST): UTC-5 (CDT)
- ZIP code: 46366
- Area code: 574
- GNIS feature ID: 454040

Wayne Township is one of nine townships in Starke County, in the U.S. state of Indiana. As of the 2020 census, its population was 4,609 (up from 4,541 at 2010) and it contained 2,010 housing units.

== Geography ==
According to the 2010 census, the township has a total area of 36.37 square miles (94.2 km^{2}), of which 36.31 square miles (94.0 km^{2}) (or 99.84%) is land and 0.06 square miles (0.16 km^{2}) (or 0.16%) is water.

=== Cities, towns, villages ===
- North Judson

=== Unincorporated towns ===
- Lena Park at 41.194485°N 86.717237°W

(This list is based on USGS data and may include former settlements.)

=== Adjacent townships ===
- Jackson Township (north)
- Center Township (northeast)
- California Township (east)
- Franklin Township, Pulaski County (southeast)
- Rich Grove Township, Pulaski County (south)
- Cass Township, Pulaski County (southwest)
- Railroad Township (west)

=== Cemeteries ===
The township contains these three cemeteries: Hepner, Highland and Saint Thomas.

=== Airports and landing strips ===
- Long Airport

=== Major highways ===
- SR 10
- SR 39

== Education ==
- North Judson-San Pierre School Corporation

Wayne Township is served by the North Judson-Wayne Township Library.

== Political districts ==
- Indiana's 2nd congressional district
- State House District 17
- State Senate District 5
