= Ora, Indiana =

- Unincorporated community and Census-designated place
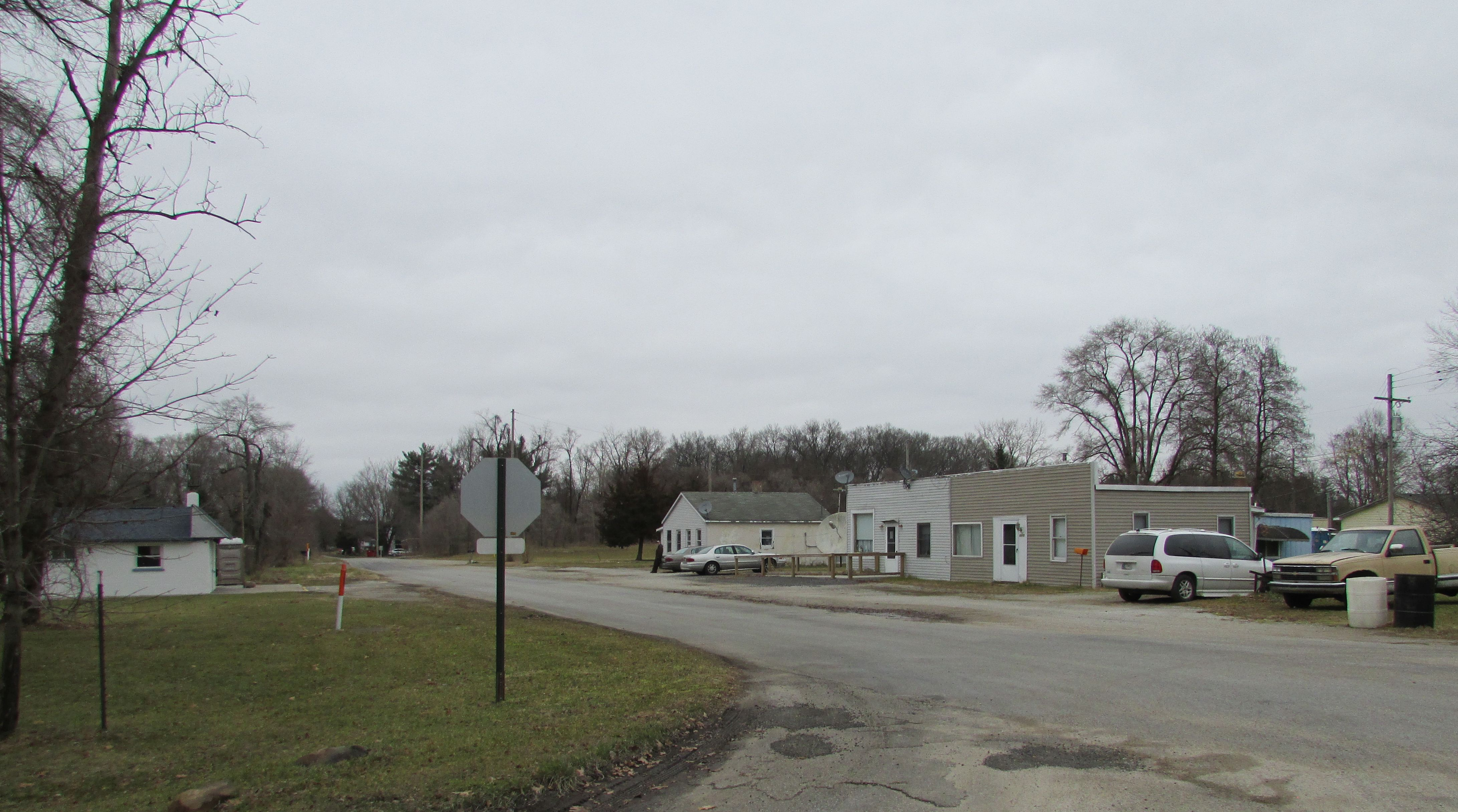
- Main Street in Ora

- Location within Indiana Location within the United States
- Coordinates: 41°10′36″N 86°33′19″W
- Country: United States
- State: Indiana
- County: Starke
- Township: North Bend
- Elevation: 732 ft (223 m)
- Time zone: UTC-6 (Central (CST))
  - Summer (DST): UTC-5 (CDT)
- ZIP code: 46968
- Area code: 574
- GNIS feature ID: 2830541

Ora is an unincorporated community in southern North Bend Township, Starke County, in the U.S. state of Indiana.

== History ==
Although Ora is unincorporated, it has a post office, with the ZIP code of 46968. It has been in operation since 1882.

== Geography ==
The community lies along CR750E southeast of the city of Knox, the county seat of Starke County.

== Demographics ==
The United States Census Bureau defined Ora as a census designated place in the 2022 American Community Survey.
