= Ober, Indiana =

- Unincorporated community
- Location within Indiana Location within the United States
- Coordinates: 41°16′15″N 86°31′28″W
- Country: United States
- State: Indiana
- County: Starke
- Township: Washington
- Elevation: 732 ft (223 m)
- Time zone: UTC-6 (Central (CST))
  - Summer (DST): UTC-5 (CDT)
- ZIP code: 46534
- Area code: 574
- GNIS feature ID: 440491

Ober is an unincorporated community in Washington Township, Starke County, in the U.S. state of Indiana.

== History ==
Ober was laid out in 1889, and was named after Ober Heath, an early settler. A post office was established at Ober in 1883, and remained in operation until 1976.
