= Oak Grove, Starke County, Indiana =

Oak Grove
- Unincorporated community
- Location within Indiana Location within the United States
- Coordinates: 41°17′16″N 86°29′10″W
- Country: United States
- State: Indiana
- County: Starke
- Township: Washington
- Elevation: 738 ft (225 m)
- Time zone: UTC-6 (Central (CST))
  - Summer (DST): UTC-5 (CDT)
- ZIP code: 46511
- Area code: 574
- GNIS feature ID: 440400

Oak Grove is an unincorporated community in Washington Township, Starke County, in the U.S. state of Indiana.
