= California Township, Starke County, Indiana =

California Township
- Township
- Location in Starke County
- Coordinates: 41°13′02″N 86°38′44″W
- Country: United States
- State: Indiana
- County: Starke
- Established: 1849

Government
  - Type: Indiana township

Area
  - Total: 36.27 sq mi (93.9 km^{2})
  - Land: 34.66 sq mi (89.8 km^{2})
  - Water: 1.61 sq mi (4.2 km^{2}) 4.44%
- Elevation: 715 ft (218 m)

Population (2020)
  - Total: 2,165
  - Density: 58/sq mi (22/km^{2})
- Time zone: UTC-6 (Central (CST))
  - Summer (DST): UTC-5 (CDT)
- ZIP codes: 46366, 46534, 46960, 46996
- Area code: 574
- GNIS feature ID: 453153

California Township is one of nine townships in Starke County, in the U.S. state of Indiana. As of the 2020 census, its population was 2,165 (up from 2,011 at 2010) and it contained 1,440 housing units.

== Geography ==
According to the 2010 census, the township has a total area of 36.27 square miles (93.9 km^{2}), of which 34.66 square miles (89.8 km^{2}) (or 95.56%) is land and 1.61 square miles (4.2 km^{2}) (or 4.44%) is water.

=== Cities, towns, villages ===
- Bass Lake (southwest half)

=== Unincorporated towns ===
- Aldine at 41.200874°N 86.674458°W
- Bass Station at 41.185319°N 86.602234°W

(This list is based on USGS data and may include former settlements.)

=== Adjacent townships ===
- Center Township (north)
- Washington Township (northeast)
- North Bend Township (east)
- Tippecanoe Township, Pulaski County (southeast)
- Franklin Township, Pulaski County (south)
- Rich Grove Township, Pulaski County (southwest)
- Wayne Township (west)
- Jackson Township (northwest)

=== Major highways ===
- US 35
- SR 10

=== Airports and landing strips ===
- Wheeler Airport

=== Lakes ===
- Round Lake

== School districts ==
- Knox Community School Corporation
- North Judson-San Pierre School Corporation

== Political districts ==
- Indiana's 2nd congressional district
- State House District 17
- State Senate District 5
