= Bass Station, Indiana =

- Unincorporated community
- Location within Indiana Location within the United States
- Coordinates: 41°11′07″N 86°36′08″W
- Country: United States
- State: Indiana
- County: Starke
- Township: California
- Elevation: 715 ft (218 m)
- Time zone: UTC-6 (Central (CST))
  - Summer (DST): UTC-5 (CDT)
- ZIP code: 46534
- Area code: 574
- GNIS feature ID: 430566

Bass Station is an unincorporated community in California Township, Starke County, in the U.S. state of Indiana.

== Geography ==
Bass Station is located on U.S. Route 35, 7.5 miles (12.1 km) south-southeast of Knox.
