= Starke County, Indiana =

County in Indiana, United States

- County
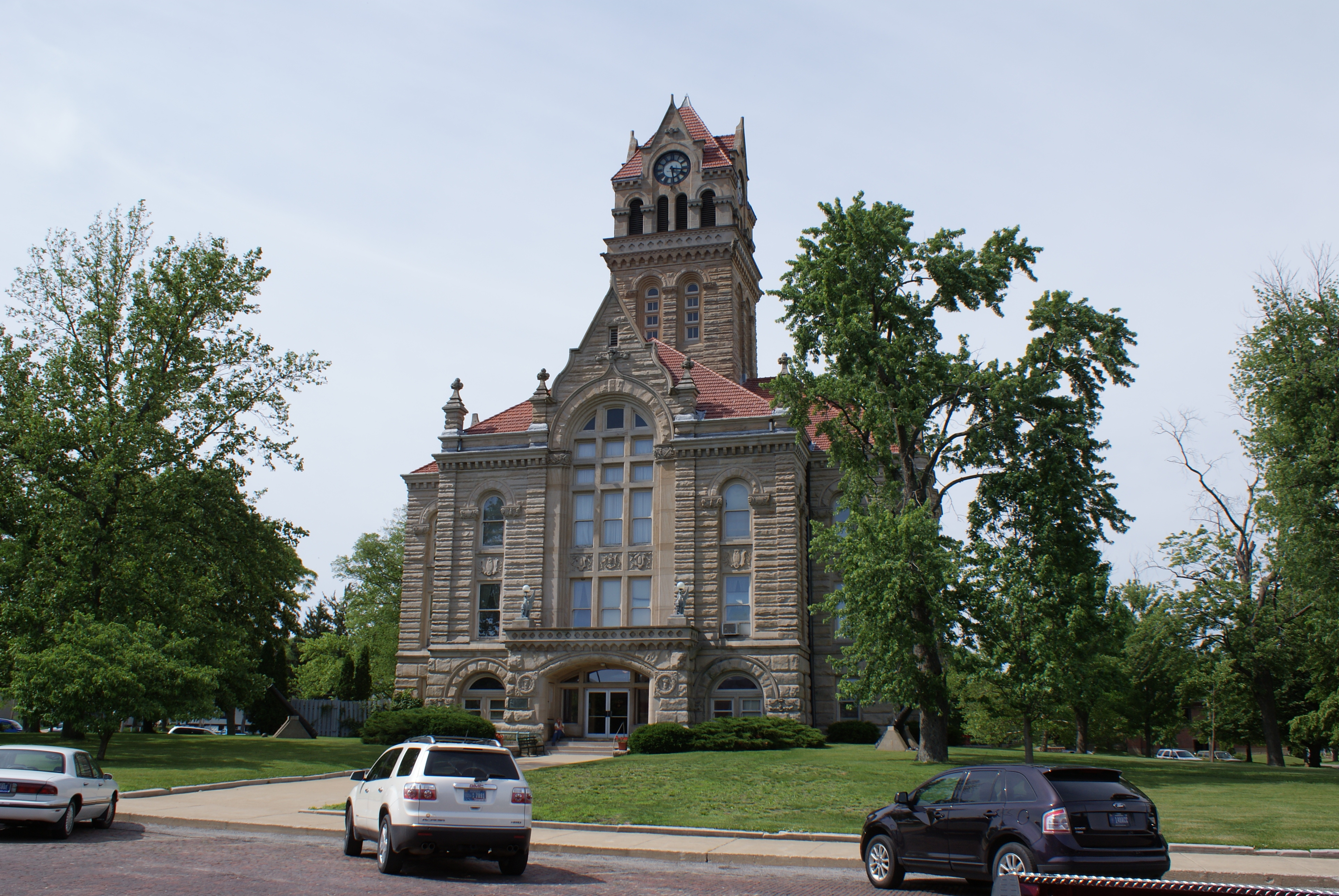
- Starke County Courthouse in Knox

- Flag Seal

- Location within the U.S. state of Indiana
- Coordinates: 41°16′N 86°39′W
- Country: United States
- State: Indiana
- Founded: February 7, 1835 (authorized); 1850 (organized)
- Named for: General John Stark
- Seat: Knox
- Largest city: Knox

Area
  - Total: 312.21 sq mi (808.6 km^{2})
  - Land: 309.13 sq mi (800.6 km^{2})
  - Water: 3.07 sq mi (8.0 km^{2}) 0.98%

Population (2020)
  - Total: 23,371
  - Estimate (2025): 23,425 ▲
  - Density: 75.602/sq mi (29.190/km^{2})
- Time zone: UTC−6 (Central)
  - Summer (DST): UTC−5 (CDT)
- Congressional district: 2nd
- Website: starke.in.gov
- Indiana county number 75

Starke County is a county in the U.S. state of Indiana. As of the 2020 United States census, its population was 23,371. The Starke County Courthouse is located in the county seat of Knox and is listed on the National Register of Historic Places.

== History ==
=== Establishment ===
During the pre-Columbian era, Starke County was home to mound-building cultural groups such as the Hopewell and Mississippians. Many of these mounds were discovered and mapped by early settlers. A 1876 map shows many mounds in Knox and between Eagle Creek and the Yellow River in Washington Township. The mounds were excavated in the 1930s.

Starke County was part of the area established as New France in 1534 during European colonization. LaSalle and his group were the first European explorers in Starke County during their expedition of the Kankakee River in 1679. Following the Treaty of Paris in 1763, Great Britain took control of the land. The United States took control of the land after the Revolutionary War ended in 1783.

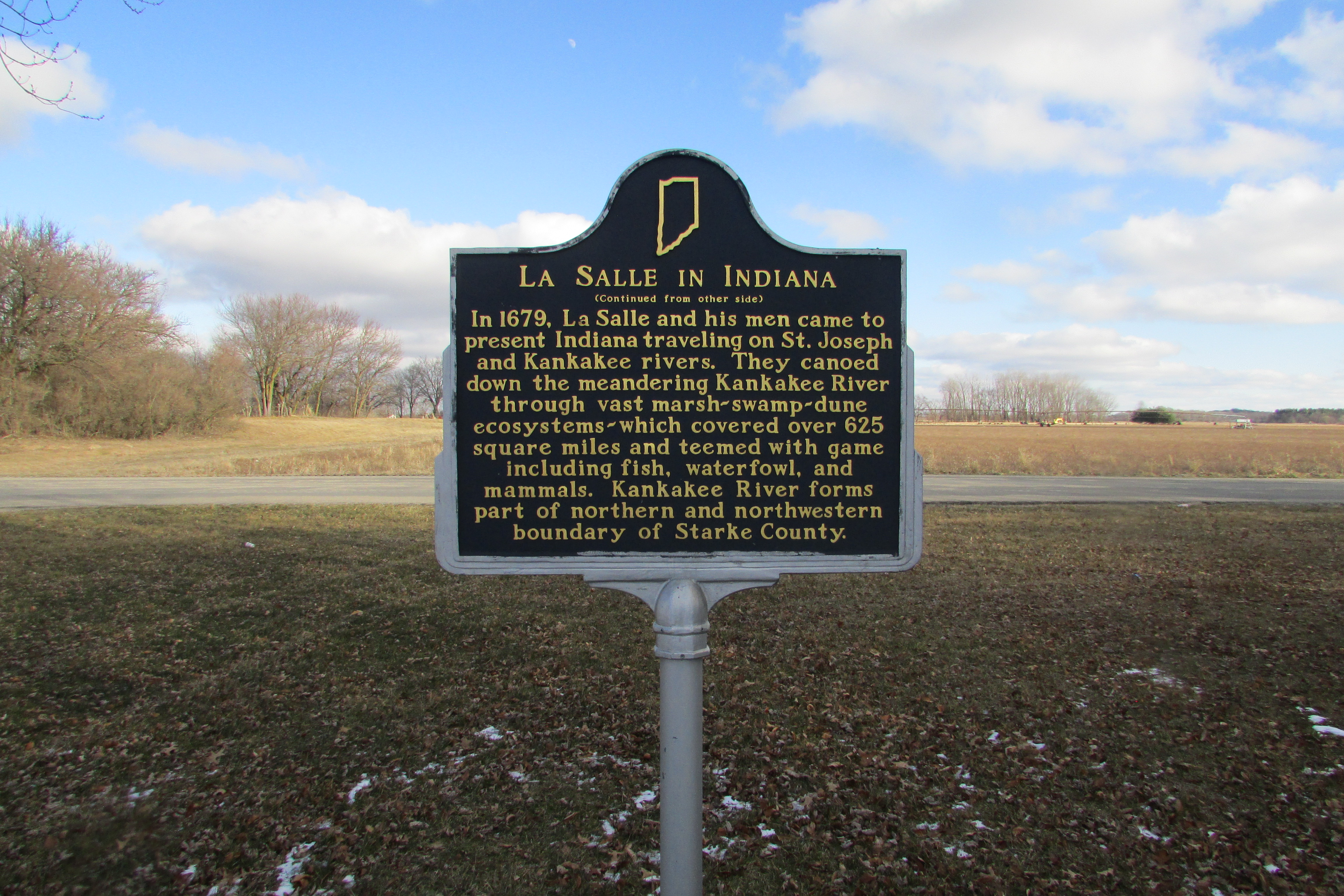
LaSalle Historical Marker in 2021, located near Hamlet in the Turkey Foot Wetland Area parking area

Starke County was part of Knox County from the beginning of Indiana's statehood until plotting in 1834. On February 7, 1835, the Indiana State Legislature passed an omnibus county bill that authorized the creation of 13 counties in northern Indiana, including Starke. It was named for Gen. John Stark, who commanded New Hampshire troops at the Battle of Bunker Hill in 1775 in the American Revolutionary War, and who defeated the British at the Battle of Bennington in 1777.

Before white settlement, the land that forms modern-day Starke County was inhabited by the Miami and Potawatomi tribes. The Potawatomi were forcibly removed to Kansas by the United States government in 1838, and many died on the Potawatomi Trail of Death.

When Starke County was established, it included the present LaPorte County townships of Cass, Dewey, Hanna, and Prairie. Residents in this area had to travel some distance east to Lemon's Bridge to cross the Kankakee River to travel south to the center of the county, the future site of the county seat at Knox. Therefore, because they were effectively isolated from the rest of Starke County, residents north of the river petitioned to be annexed to LaPorte county and this was done on January 28, 1842.

The county government commenced in 1850. During this time, Starke County began to grow and make community improvements. The first regular election was held in 1852, and three railroads were built through the county within the decade. In 1863, construction began on the second courthouse — located on the same site as the current one. The first metal bridge was installed in 1881 at the Yellow River in Knox, and electricity and telephone service became available in 1895 and 1898, respectively, to the residents of Knox and Hamlet.

=== Railroads ===
The first railroad in the county was New Albany and Chicago (Monon) Railroad, built through Culvertown (San Pierre) in 1853. The Pittsburgh, Fort Wayne, and Chicago (Pennsylvania) Railroad was built through Davis Station, Hamlet, and Grovertown in 1856. The Cincinnati and Chicago (Pennsylvania) Railroad was built through English Lake and North Judson in 1857.

On May 1, 1865, President Abraham Lincoln’s funeral train stopped in San Pierre on its journey from Washington D.C. to Springfield, Illinois.

The Indiana, Illinois and Iowa (NYC) Railroad was built through San Pierre and North Judson in 1881, extended to Knox in 1885, and extended to South Bend in 1894. The New York, Chicago & St. Louis (Nickle Plate) Railroad was built through Brems, Knox, and Ober in 1882. The Chicago and Atlantic (Erie) Railroad was built through Lomax, North Judson, Aldine, Bass Station, and Ora in the 1880s. An Erie spur line was extended to the south end of Bass Lake in 1897.

The Churchill-White Company built Starke County's first grain elevator along the Indiana, Illinois and Iowa Railroad in Hamlet in 1899.

The Cincinnati, Richmond, and Muncie (CO) Railroad was built through English Lake and North Judson in 1902.

=== Flag ===
In October 2016, Starke County unveiled the new county flag after it was presented to the county by Melba Shilling and her son, Brad. Melba presented this flag in memory of her late husband, Jim, who grew up in Starke County and wanted to see it have its own flag. The flag was designed by Jim's then 12-year-old granddaughter, Kaylee Crom.

The flag consist of Starke County imposed over a yellow Indiana with a red, white, and blue background. There are 12 stars to represent the 12 original townships. The nine stars inside the county represent the current nine townships; the three outside represent the three townships lost as a result of the LaPorte County annexation. Text on the flag consists of the county name in red and the establishment year in blue.

== Name ==
Despite being named for General John Stark and originally being known and appearing on maps as Stark County when initially created and organized, an e was added to the county's name fairly early in its history. No solid evidence has been found to clearly explain this alteration. Three possible explanations have been advanced - an early scribe had "fancy lettering", including a k with a long tail or flourish that appeared to others as ke, with the new spelling sticking; General Stark himself may have used a similar flourish at the end of his signature; which became a point of confusion to Indiana officials (unlikely, since Stark County, Ohio (1808) and Illinois (1839) both preceded Starke County, Indiana, not to mention numerous other smaller midwestern toponyms spelled "Stark"); or an Indianapolis official's clerical error around 1860.

== Geography ==
Starke County consists of low, rolling hills covered with vegetation or brush. Its boundaries include three prominences that rise to 780 ft (240 m) above sea level - two adjacent swells 0.6 miles (0.97 km) northeast of Bass Lake, and a small ridge 3.0 miles (4.8 km) east-southeast of Bass Lake.

According to the 2010 census, Starke County has a total area of 312.21 square miles (808.6 km^{2}), of which 3.07 square miles (8.0 km^{2}) (or 0.98%) are covered by water. The northwestern boundary of Starke County is defined by the Kankakee River; the Yellow River, a tributary of the Kankakee, flows through the central part of the county, past Knox.

From 2014 until 2024, the city of Knox was the geographic center of the Big Ten Conference, according to a 2018 article in fivethirtyeight.com that referred to locations of various NCAA Men's Basketball Conference championships.

=== Major highways ===
- U.S. Route 30
- U.S. Route 35
- U.S. Route 421
- State Road 8
- State Road 10
- State Road 23
- State Road 39

=== Adjacent counties ===
- Fulton County - southeast
- Jasper County - west
- LaPorte County - north
- Marshall County - east
- Porter County - northwest
- Pulaski County - south
- St. Joseph County - northeast

== Municipalities ==
The municipalities in Starke County, and their populations as of the 2020 Census, are:

=== Cities and towns ===
- Hamlet – 773
- Knox – 3,662
- North Judson – 1,857

=== Census-designated places ===
- Bass Lake – 1,384
- Koontz Lake – 1,667
- San Pierre – 153

=== Unincorporated communities ===
- Aldine
- Bass Station
- Brems
- English Lake
- Grovertown
- Indian Hill
- Hartz Lake
- Lena Park
- Lomax
- Oak Grove
- Ober
- Ora
- Toto
- Winona

== Townships ==
The nine townships of Starke County, with their populations as of the 2020 Census, are:

- California – 2,165
- Center – 6,131
- Davis – 1,002
- Jackson – 585
- North Bend – 1,504
- Oregon – 3,220
- Railroad – 1,211
- Washington – 2,944
- Wayne – 4,609

== Education ==
=== Schools ===
Public schools in Starke County are administered by four different districts:

- Culver Community Schools
- Knox Community School Corporation
- North Judson-San Pierre Schools
- Oregon-Davis School Corporation

=== Libraries ===
The Starke County Public Library (SCPL) was founded in Knox in 1852. In 1970, all county libraries except one were incorporated into SCPL. Today there are four branches: Schricker (Knox), Hamlet, Koontz Lake, and San Pierre.

North Judson-Wayne Township Public Library was gifted as a Carnegie Library. This is the only library in the county that is not part of the SCPL system.

== Hospitals ==
- Northwest Health Starke

== Climate and weather ==
Knox, Indiana

Climate chart (precipitation, max. and min. temperature)
J	F	M	A	M	J	J	A	S	O	N	D
1.9 31 14	1.7 36 18	2.7 47 28	3.5 60 38	3.8 72 50	4.1 80 59	3.9 84 63	3.9 82 61	3.3 75 53	2.9 64 42	3.1 49 31	2.6 36 20
- █ Average max. and min. temperatures in °F
- █ Precipitation totals in inches
- Source: The Weather Channel
Metric conversion
J	F	M	A	M	J	J	A	S	O	N	D
49 −1 −10	43 2 −8	70 8 −2	89 16 3	97 22 10	104 27 15	99 29 17	98 28 16	83 24 12	75 18 6	78 9 −1	66 2 −7
- █ Average max. and min. temperatures in °C
- █ Precipitation totals in mm

In recent years, average temperatures in Knox have ranged from a low of 14 °F (−10 °C) in January to a high of 84 °F (29 °C) in July, although a record low of −29 °F (−34 °C) was recorded in January 1985 and a record high of 102 °F (39 °C) was recorded in June 1988. Average monthly precipitation ranged from 1.68 inches (43 mm) in February to 4.09 inches (104 mm) in June.

On March 10, 2026, a rare tornado emergency was issued for Knox in Center Township, Starke County for a large and destructive tornado.

== Government ==
The county government is a constitutional body, granted specific powers by the Constitution of Indiana and the Indiana Code.

County Council: The county council is the legislative branch of the county government and controls spending and revenue collection in the county. Representatives are elected from county districts to four-year terms. They are responsible for setting salaries, the annual budget, and special spending. The council has limited authority to impose local taxes, in the form of an income and property tax that is subject to state level approval, excise taxes, and service taxes.

Board of Commissioners: The executive body of the county, the commissioners are elected county-wide to staggered four-year terms. One commissioner serves as president. The commissioners execute the acts legislated by the council, collect revenue, and manage the functions of the county government.

Court: The judge on the court is elected to a term of six years. The judge is assisted by a magistrate who is appointed by the judge. The court handles criminal and civil cases, and has a small-claims division. In some cases, court decisions can be appealed to the state-level circuit court.

County officials: The county has other elected offices, including sheriff, coroner, auditor, treasurer, recorder, surveyor, and circuit court clerk, elected to four-year terms. Members elected to county government positions are required to declare party affiliations and to be residents of the county.

Starke County is part of Indiana's 2nd congressional district in the United States House of Representatives and is currently represented by Rudy Yakym.

In presidential elections, Starke County was a bellwether county for a time, voting for the winner in every election from 1964 to 2008. Since the Donald Trump era, much like virtually all of Indiana, the county is extremely Republican.

United States presidential election results for Starke County, Indiana
Year	Republican		Democratic		Third party(ies)	
Year	No.	%	No.	%	No.	%
1888	834	47.23%	904	51.19%	28	1.59%
1892	850	44.34%	1,003	52.32%	64	3.34%
1896	1,289	51.01%	1,214	48.04%	24	0.95%
1900	1,340	49.56%	1,315	48.63%	49	1.81%
1904	1,523	54.47%	1,134	40.56%	139	4.97%
1908	1,521	52.18%	1,305	44.77%	89	3.05%
1912	787	28.11%	1,208	43.14%	805	28.75%
1916	1,550	52.21%	1,334	44.93%	85	2.86%
1920	2,683	62.92%	1,467	34.40%	114	2.67%
1924	2,329	53.00%	1,555	35.39%	510	11.61%
1928	2,759	57.32%	2,016	41.89%	38	0.79%
1932	2,449	40.75%	3,420	56.91%	141	2.35%
1936	2,846	47.18%	3,143	52.11%	43	0.71%
1940	3,473	54.16%	2,917	45.49%	22	0.34%
1944	3,574	55.71%	2,791	43.51%	50	0.78%
1948	3,518	50.55%	3,312	47.59%	130	1.87%
1952	4,871	59.43%	3,274	39.95%	51	0.62%
1956	5,063	59.94%	3,349	39.65%	35	0.41%
1960	4,592	53.28%	3,995	46.35%	32	0.37%
1964	3,466	41.65%	4,838	58.14%	17	0.20%
1968	4,011	47.95%	3,208	38.35%	1,146	13.70%
1972	5,520	64.43%	2,994	34.95%	53	0.62%
1976	4,354	47.12%	4,753	51.43%	134	1.45%
1980	5,035	55.27%	3,615	39.68%	460	5.05%
1984	5,104	57.42%	3,674	41.33%	111	1.25%
1988	4,458	51.80%	4,104	47.69%	44	0.51%
1992	3,100	35.40%	3,695	42.19%	1,963	22.41%
1996	3,108	38.13%	3,854	47.29%	1,188	14.58%
2000	4,349	49.98%	4,136	47.53%	216	2.48%
2004	4,846	54.22%	3,987	44.61%	104	1.16%
2008	4,473	47.19%	4,778	50.41%	228	2.41%
2012	4,738	54.03%	3,809	43.44%	222	2.53%
2016	6,367	68.34%	2,489	26.72%	460	4.94%
2020	7,466	72.42%	2,650	25.71%	193	1.87%
2024	7,889	75.29%	2,436	23.25%	153	1.46%

== Demographics ==
Historical population
Census	Pop.	Note	%±
1840	149		—
1850	557		273.8%
1860	2,195		294.1%
1870	3,888		77.1%
1880	5,105		31.3%
1890	7,339		43.8%
1900	10,431		42.1%
1910	10,567		1.3%
1920	10,278		−2.7%
1930	10,620		3.3%
1940	12,258		15.4%
1950	15,282		24.7%
1960	17,911		17.2%
1970	19,280		7.6%
1980	21,997		14.1%
1990	22,747		3.4%
2000	23,556		3.6%
2010	23,363		−0.8%
2020	23,371		0.0%
2025 (est.)	23,425	▲	0.2%
US Decennial Census; 1790-1960 1900-1990; 1990-2000 2010-2021

=== Racial and ethnic composition ===
Starke County, Indiana – Racial and ethnic composition Note: the US Census treats Hispanic/Latino as an ethnic category. This table excludes Latinos from the racial categories and assigns them to a separate category. Hispanics/Latinos may be of any race.
Race / Ethnicity (NH = Non-Hispanic)	Pop 1980	Pop 1990	Pop 2000	Pop 2010	Pop 2020	% 1980	% 1990	% 2000	% 2010	% 2020
White alone (NH)	21,650	22,195	22,685	22,212	21,395	98.42%	97.57%	96.30%	95.07%	91.55%
Black or African American alone (NH)	32	72	51	63	67	0.15%	0.32%	0.22%	0.27%	0.29%
Native American or Alaska Native alone (NH)	42	81	51	61	60	0.19%	0.36%	0.22%	0.26%	0.26%
Asian alone (NH)	38	31	47	41	40	0.17%	0.14%	0.20%	0.18%	0.17%
Native Hawaiian or Pacific Islander alone (NH)	x	x	6	0	4	x	x	0.03%	0.00%	0.02%
Other race alone (NH)	7	1	8	2	41	0.03%	0.00%	0.03%	0.01%	0.18%
Mixed race or Multiracial (NH)	x	x	194	218	862	x	x	0.82%	0.93%	3.69%
Hispanic or Latino (any race)	228	367	514	766	902	1.04%	1.61%	2.18%	3.28%	3.86%
Total	21,997	22,747	23,556	23,363	23,371	100.00%	100.00%	100.00%	100.00%	100.00%

=== 2020 census ===
As of the 2020 census, the county had a population of 23,371. The median age was 43.0 years. 22.3% of residents were under the age of 18 and 20.1% of residents were 65 years of age or older. For every 100 females there were 100.3 males, and for every 100 females age 18 and over there were 99.1 males age 18 and over.

The racial makeup of the county was 93.1% White, 0.4% Black or African American, 0.3% American Indian and Alaska Native, 0.2% Asian, <0.1% Native Hawaiian and Pacific Islander, 1.0% from some other race, and 5.0% from two or more races. Hispanic or Latino residents of any race comprised 3.9% of the population.

<0.1% of residents lived in urban areas, while 100.0% lived in rural areas.

There were 9,287 households in the county, of which 28.9% had children under the age of 18 living in them. Of all households, 50.2% were married-couple households, 18.9% were households with a male householder and no spouse or partner present, and 22.4% were households with a female householder and no spouse or partner present. About 26.1% of all households were made up of individuals and 12.7% had someone living alone who was 65 years of age or older.

There were 11,123 housing units, of which 16.5% were vacant. Among occupied housing units, 79.9% were owner-occupied and 20.1% were renter-occupied. The homeowner vacancy rate was 1.5% and the rental vacancy rate was 7.6%.

=== 2010 census ===
As of the 2010 United States census, 23,363 people, 9,038 households, and 6,484 families lived in the county. The population density was 75.6 inhabitants per square mile (29.2/km^{2}). The 10,962 housing units had an average density of 35.5 per square mile (13.7/km^{2}). The racial makeup of the county was 97.1% White, 0.3% American Indian, 0.3% Black or African American, 0.2% Asian, 0.9% from other races, and 1.3% from two or more races. Those of Hispanic or Latino origin made up 3.3% of the population. In terms of ancestry, 27.2% were German, 16.3% were Irish, 8.9% were English, 8.7% were American, and 6.9% were Polish.

Of the 9,038 households, 32.7% had children under 18 living with them, 54.2% were married couples living together, 11.7% had a female householder with no husband present, 28.3% were not families, and 23.5% of all households were made up of individuals. The average household size was 2.58, and the average family size was 3.02. The median age was 40.4 years.

The median income for a household in the county was $47,697 and for a family was $44,044. Males had a median income of $37,507 versus $28,628 for females. The per capita income for the county was $17,991. About 12.9% of families and 15.7% of the population were below the poverty line, including 25.1% of those under 18 and 7.0% of those 65 or over.

== See also ==
- National Register of Historic Places listings in Starke County, Indiana
