= Winona, Indiana =

- Unincorporated community
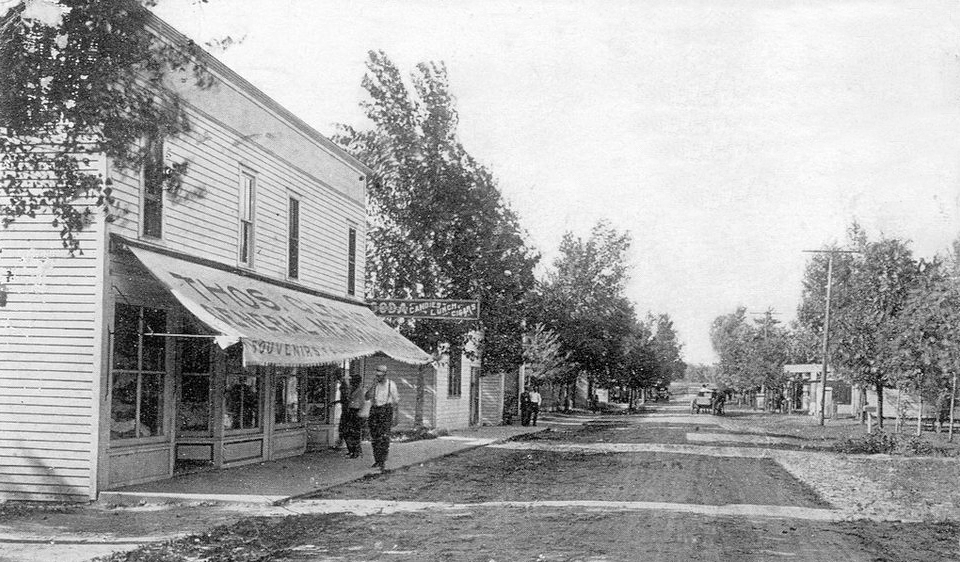
- Winona, circa 1910

- Location within Indiana Location within the United States
- Coordinates: 41°14′10″N 86°34′10″W
- Country: United States
- State: Indiana
- County: Starke
- Township: North Bend
- Elevation: 725 ft (221 m)
- Time zone: UTC-6 (Central (CST))
  - Summer (DST): UTC-5 (CDT)
- ZIP code: 46534
- Area code: 574
- GNIS feature ID: 446187

Winona is an unincorporated community in North Bend Township, Starke County, in the U.S. state of Indiana.

== History ==
A post office was established at Winona in 1891, and remained in operation until it was discontinued in 1905.
