= Hamlet, Indiana =

Town in Starke County, Indiana, United States

- Town
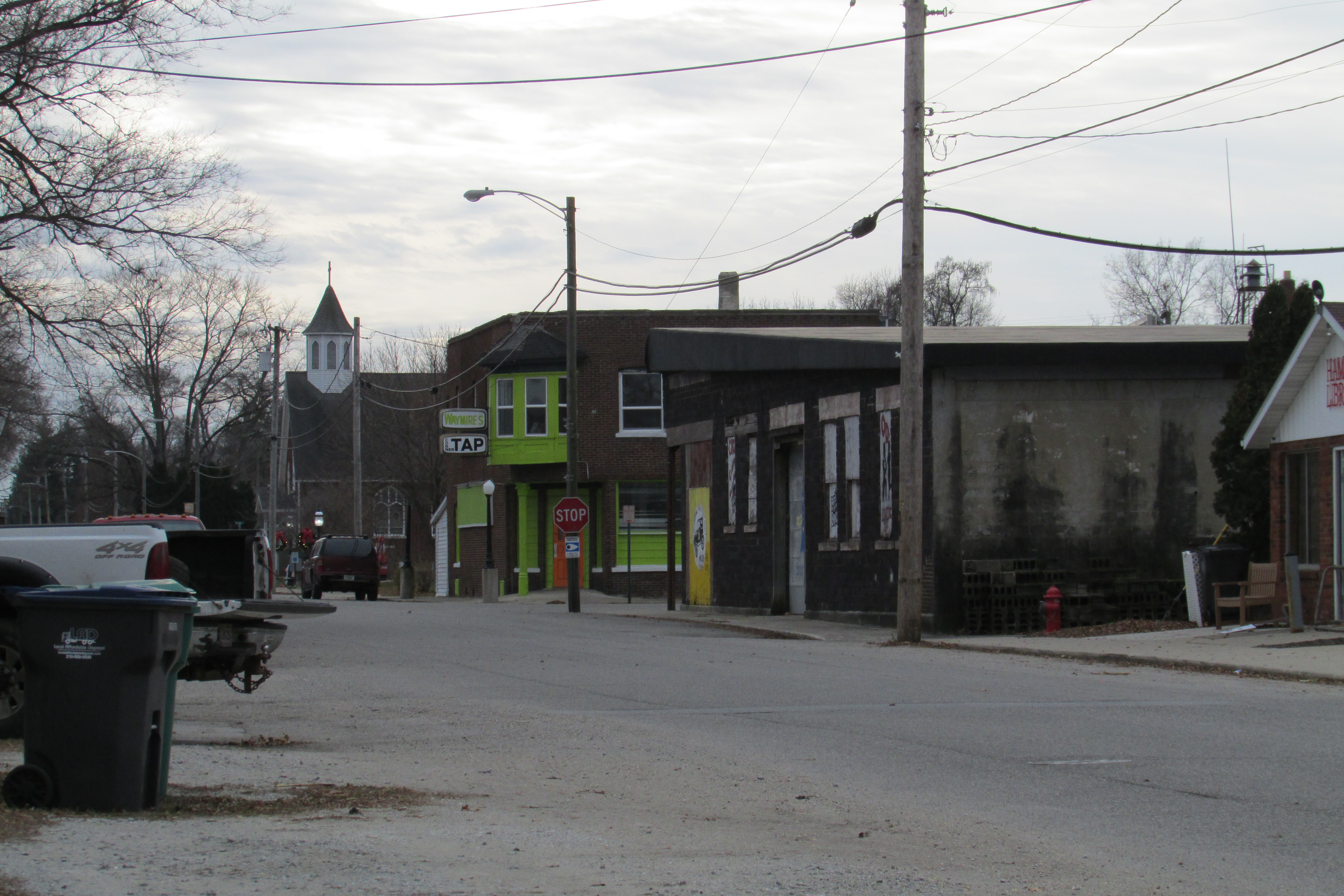
- South Starke Street, Downtown Hamlet, 2021

- Location of Hamlet in Starke County, Indiana.
- Coordinates: 41°22′34″N 86°34′58″W
- Country: United States
- State: Indiana
- County: Starke
- Townships: Davis, Oregon
- Established: 1863

Area
  - Total: 0.98 sq mi (2.53 km^{2})
  - Land: 0.97 sq mi (2.50 km^{2})
  - Water: 0.012 sq mi (0.03 km^{2})
- Elevation: 699 ft (213 m)

Population (2020)
  - Total: 773
  - Density: 800.9/sq mi (309.21/km^{2})
- Time zone: UTC-6 (CST)
  - Summer (DST): UTC-5 (CDT)
- ZIP code: 46532
- Area codes: 574 and 219
- FIPS code: 18-30708
- GNIS feature ID: 2396983
- Website: Official website

Hamlet is a town in Davis and Oregon Townships, Starke County, Indiana, United States. As of the 2020 census, Hamlet had a population of 773.

== History ==
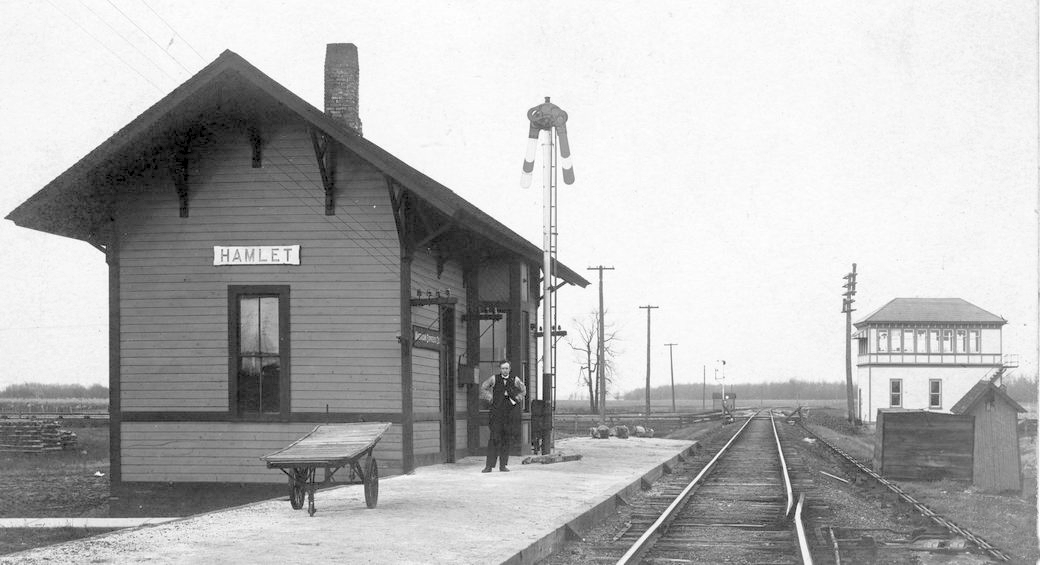
Depot in Hamlet, circa 1910

Hamlet was laid out in 1863 by John Hamlet, for whom the town is named. A post office was established in 1864, and Hamlet was incorporated in 1896.

Two railroad lines existed in Hamlet: the Pittsburgh, Fort Wayne, and Chicago (Pennsylvania), built in 1856, and the Chicago, Indiana, and Southern (New York Central), also known as the Kankakee Belt. In 1968, these two railroads merged to become the Penn Central Railroad. In 1976, Penn Central, along with several other languishing eastern railroads, were in bankruptcy, and was part of the federal government's takeover, creating Conrail. Both rail lines continued to see heavy use until the late 1970s under Conrail. By the early 1980s, the Kankakee Belt had been abandoned and removed, and the former Pennsylvania mainline's traffic had dropped dramatically, due to redundant east/west Conrail lines. Today, what remains of the former Pennsylvania mainline is operated by the Chicago, Fort Wayne and Eastern Railroad, which served Hamlet's large CO-OP grain elevator during the fall harvest rush.

In 1894, a new school building was built, and in 1900, Hamlet High School was built. All remaining one-room schoolhouses in Davis Township would consolidate into Hamlet High School. The schoolhouse was expanded to add new classrooms in 1916 and a new gymnasium in 1925. A new elementary school was built in 1953. Hamlet High School consolidated into Oregon-Davis Junior/Senior High School in the 1960s.

The first telephone service in the county was established in Hamlet and Knox in 1898. Electric power came to the town from Plymouth Electric Light and Power in 1916. A town-wide water system was established in 1925.

In 1959, an approximately 4.5-to-8.2-pound (2.0 to 3.7 kg) meteor struck a home in Hamlet. The meteor, named for Hamlet, is preserved in the Smithsonian Institution in Washington, D.C., and the Field Museum of Natural History in Chicago, Illinois.

== Geography ==
The town of Hamlet was originally on both sides of US 30. In 1926, US 30 was realigned with the Indiana Realignment. U.S. Route 30 bypasses Hamlet, about a half mile to the north. It is about 2 mi (3.2 km) east of highway U.S. 35.

According to the 2010 census, Hamlet has a total area of 0.98 square miles (2.54 km^{2}), of which 0.97 square miles (2.51 km^{2}) (or 98.98%) is land and 0.01 square miles (0.03 km^{2}) (or 1.02%) is water.

== Demographics ==
Historical population
Census	Pop.	Note	%±
1870	47		—
1900	432		—
1910	579		34.0%
1920	480		−17.1%
1930	418		−12.9%
1940	519		24.2%
1950	659		27.0%
1960	688		4.4%
1970	761		10.6%
1980	738		−3.0%
1990	789		6.9%
2000	820		3.9%
2010	800		−2.4%
2020	773		−3.4%
U.S. Decennial Census

=== 2010 census ===
As of the census of 2010, there were 800 people, 299 households, and 225 families living in the town. The population density was 824.7 inhabitants per square mile (318.4/km^{2}). There were 332 housing units at an average density of 342.3 per square mile (132.2/km^{2}). The racial makeup of the town was 96.6% White, 1.0% Native American, 0.1% Asian, 0.6% from other races, and 1.6% from two or more races. Hispanic or Latino of any race were 2.6% of the population.

There were 299 households, of which 37.1% had children under the age of 18 living with them, 48.8% were married couples living together, 18.7% had a female householder with no husband present, 7.7% had a male householder with no wife present, and 24.7% were non-families. 19.7% of all households were made up of individuals, and 7.3% had someone living alone who was 65 years of age or older. The average household size was 2.68 and the average family size was 3.01.

The median age in the town was 35 years. 27.6% of residents were under the age of 18; 11.4% were between the ages of 18 and 24; 25.1% were from 25 to 44; 23.6% were from 45 to 64; and 12.6% were 65 years of age or older. The gender makeup of the town was 49.5% male and 50.5% female.

=== 2000 census ===
As of the census of 2000, there were 820 people, 307 households, and 225 families living in the town. The population density was 849.5 inhabitants per square mile (328.0/km^{2}). There were 336 housing units at an average density of 348.1 per square mile (134.4/km^{2}). The racial makeup of the town was 98.05% White, 0.12% African American, 0.37% Native American, 0.49% Pacific Islander, 0.24% from other races, and 0.73% from two or more races. Hispanic or Latino of any race were 1.34% of the population.

There were 307 households, out of which 40.4% had children under the age of 18 living with them, 54.7% were married couples living together, 12.7% had a female householder with no husband present, and 26.4% were non-families. 21.2% of all households were made up of individuals, and 6.2% had someone living alone who was 65 years of age or older. The average household size was 2.67 and the average family size was 3.08.

In the town, the population was spread out, with 30.9% under the age of 18, 7.9% from 18 to 24, 31.8% from 25 to 44, 21.3% from 45 to 64, and 8.0% who were 65 years of age or older. The median age was 32 years. For every 100 females, there were 103.5 males. For every 100 females age 18 and over, there were 96.2 males.

The median income for a household in the town was $30,750, and the median income for a family was $36,389. Males had a median income of $28,036 versus $20,921 for females. The per capita income for the town was $12,811. About 15.4% of families and 17.3% of the population were below the poverty line, including 23.1% of those under age 18 and 15.0% of those age 65 or over.

== Arts and culture ==
Hamlet has a public library, a branch of the Starke County Public Library System.
