= Tippecanoe Township, Pulaski County, Indiana =

Tippecanoe Township
- Township
- Location in Pulaski County
- Coordinates: 41°07′37″N 86°31′33″W
- Country: United States
- State: Indiana
- County: Pulaski

Government
  - Type: Indiana township

Area
  - Total: 36.55 sq mi (94.7 km^{2})
  - Land: 36.42 sq mi (94.3 km^{2})
  - Water: 0.14 sq mi (0.36 km^{2}) 0.38%
- Elevation: 712 ft (217 m)

Population (2020)
  - Total: 994
  - Density: 27.3/sq mi (10.5/km^{2})
- ZIP codes: 46511, 46960, 46996
- GNIS feature ID: 453897

Tippecanoe Township is one of twelve townships in Pulaski County, Indiana, United States. As of the 2020 census, its population was 994 and it contained 521 housing units.

Tippecanoe Township was organized in 1839, and named after the Tippecanoe River.

Historical population
Census	Pop.	Note	%±
1890	981		—
1900	1,181		20.4%
1910	1,123		−4.9%
1920	1,121		−0.2%
1930	975		−13.0%
1940	1,014		4.0%
1950	970		−4.3%
1960	1,003		3.4%
1970	920		−8.3%
1980	1,041		13.2%
1990	997		−4.2%
2000	1,130		13.3%
2010	1,104		−2.3%
2020	994		−10.0%
Source: US Decennial Census

== Geography ==
According to the 2010 census, the township has a total area of 36.55 square miles (94.7 km^{2}), of which 36.42 square miles (94.3 km^{2}) (or 99.64%) is land and 0.14 square miles (0.36 km^{2}) (or 0.38%) is water.

=== Cities, towns, villages ===
- Monterey

=== Unincorporated towns ===
- Lawton at 41.099764°N 86.525008°W
- Vanmeter Park at 41.085875°N 86.568064°W

(This list is based on USGS data and may include former settlements.)

=== Adjacent townships ===
- North Bend Township, Starke County (north)
- Union Township, Marshall County (northeast)
- Aubbeenaubbee Township, Fulton County (east)
- Harrison Township (south)
- Monroe Township (southwest)
- Franklin Township (west)
- California Township, Starke County (northwest)

=== Lakes ===
- Langenbaum Lake

=== Landmarks ===
- Beason Park
- Tippecanoe River State Park (partial)

== Education ==
- Culver Community Schools Corporation

Tippecanoe Township residents are served by the Monterey-Tippecanoe Township Public Library.

== Political districts ==
- Indiana's 2nd congressional district
- State House District 20
- State Senate District 18
