= Lomax, Indiana =

- Unincorporated community
- Location within Indiana Location within the United States
- Coordinates: 41°15′32″N 86°52′18″W
- Country: United States
- State: Indiana
- County: Starke
- Township: Railroad
- Elevation: 666 ft (203 m)
- Time zone: UTC-6 (Central (CST))
  - Summer (DST): UTC-5 (CDT)
- ZIP code: 46374
- Area code: 219
- GNIS feature ID: 438234

Lomax is an unincorporated community in Railroad Township, Starke County, Indiana.

In 1882, the Chicago and Atlantic Railway constructed its line from Columbus, Ohio, to Chicago, Illinois. The railroad constructed a depot and named it Lomax Station. Several communities, including Lomax, grew up at its stops.

The Standard Oil Company built a steam-powered pumping station for a pipeline, running alongside the tracks, connecting an oilfield in Ohio to a refinery in Whiting, Indiana. The pumping station "consisted of five brick buildings, a boiler house, pump house, gate/valve house, telegraph office and a dormitory." The pumping station was demolished in 1933.

There was a one-room schoolhouse c. 1912.
