= Oregon Township, Starke County, Indiana =

Oregon Township
- Township
- Location in Starke County
- Coordinates: 41°23′24″N 86°31′40″W
- Country: United States
- State: Indiana
- County: Starke
- Established: 1846

Government
  - Type: Indiana township

Area
  - Total: 36.12 sq mi (93.6 km^{2})
  - Land: 35.65 sq mi (92.3 km^{2})
  - Water: 0.47 sq mi (1.2 km^{2}) 1.30%
- Elevation: 709 ft (216 m)

Population (2020)
  - Total: 3,220
  - Density: 94.4/sq mi (36.4/km^{2})
- Time zone: UTC-6 (Central (CST))
  - Summer (DST): UTC-5 (CDT)
- ZIP codes: 46531, 46532, 46574
- Area code: 574
- GNIS feature ID: 453694

Oregon Township is one of nine townships in Starke County, Indiana. As of the 2020 census, its population was 3,220 (down from 3,367 at 2010) and it contained 1,658 housing units.

== Geography ==
According to the 2010 census, the township has a total area of 36.12 square miles (93.6 km^{2}), of which 35.65 square miles (92.3 km^{2}) (or 98.70%) is land and 0.47 square miles (1.2 km^{2}) (or 1.30%) is water.

=== Cities, towns, villages ===
- Hamlet (east half)
- Koontz Lake (vast majority)

=== Unincorporated towns ===
- Grovertown at 41.375043°N 86.504734°W

(This list is based on USGS data and may include former settlements.)

=== Adjacent townships ===
- Johnson Township, LaPorte County (north)
- Lincoln Township, St. Joseph County (northeast)
- Polk Township, Marshall County (east)
- West Township, Marshall County (southeast)
- Washington Township (south)
- Center Township (southwest)
- Davis Township (west)
- Union Township, LaPorte County (northwest)

=== Cemeteries ===
The township contains Fletcher Cemetery.

=== Major highways ===
- US 30
- SR 23

== School districts ==
- Oregon-Davis School Corporation

== Political districts ==
- Indiana's 2nd congressional district
- State House District 17
- State Senate District 5
