= Herman Sayger =

American football and basketball coach (1895–1970)

Herman "Suz" Sayger
Biographical details
- Born: January 3, 1895; Jonesboro, Arkansas, U.S.
- Died: January 24, 1970 (aged 75); New Bedford, Pennsylvania, U.S.

Playing career

Football
- 1916–1919: Heidelberg
- Position: Quarterback

Coaching career (HC unless noted)

Football
- 1917: Heidelberg
- 1920: Barberton HS (OH)
- 1921–1923: Akron (assistant)
- 1924–1929: Heidelberg

Basketball
- 1924–1930: Heidelberg

Head coaching record
- Overall: 29–18–4 (college football); 41–33 (college basketball)

Accomplishments and honors

Championships
- Football; 1 OAC (1928)

Herman Earl Sayger (January 3, 1895 – January 24, 1970) was an American football and basketball coach. He served as the head football coach at Heidelberg College in 1917 and from 1924 to 1929.

Sayger holds the Indiana high school all-time record for most points scored in a game with 113 points (56 FG, 1 FT) in a 154-10 Culver win against Winamac on March 8, 1913 at Culver.

Sayger died on January 24, 1970, at Bedford County Memorial Hospital in New Bedford, Pennsylvania.

Heidelberg has named the gymnasium building in his honor.

== Head coaching record ==
=== College football ===
Year	Team	Overall	Conference	Standing	Bowl/playoffs
Heidelberg (Independent) (1917)
1917	Heidelberg	5–1–1			
Heidelberg Student Princes (Ohio Athletic Conference) (1924–1929)
1924	Heidelberg	3–3–2	3–2–2	T–7th	
1925	Heidelberg	4–4	3–4	T–12th	
1926	Heidelberg	3–4	2–4	15th	
1927	Heidelberg	4–3	4–2	T–7th	
1928	Heidelberg	6–0–1	6–0–1	1st	
1929	Heidelberg	4–3	2–0	2nd	
Heidelberg:		29–18–4	20–12–3		
Total:		29–18–4			
National championship Conference title Conference division title or championship game berth
