= Brems (automobile) =

Overview
- Manufacturer: Julius Brems
- Production: 1900–1908
- Assembly: Viborg, Denmark
- Designer: Julius Brems

Body and chassis
- Class: Early automobile

Powertrain
- Engine: 2-cylinder petrol engine
- Transmission: 2-speed manual

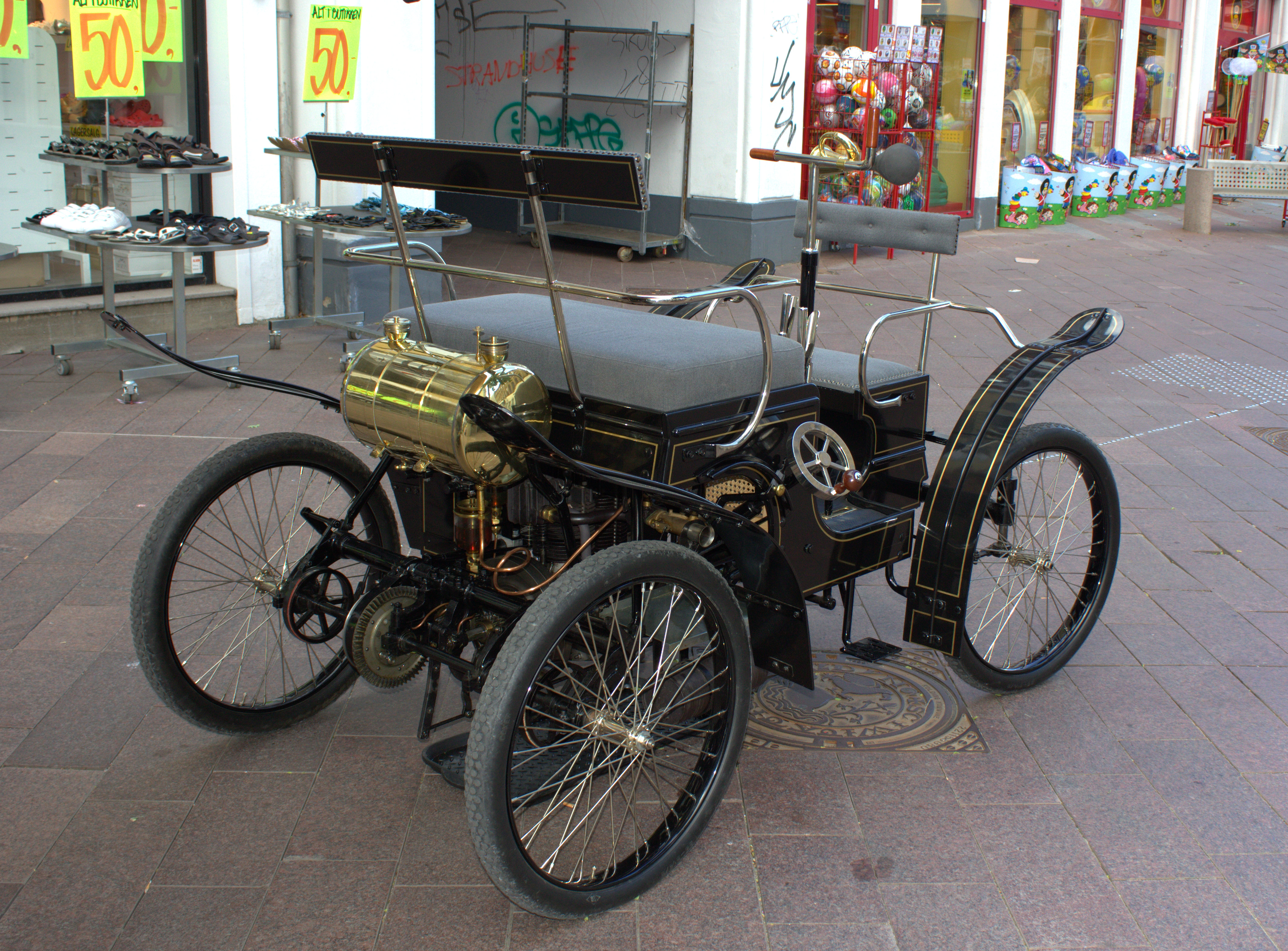
The picture shows a newly built copy 2012.

Brems was the brand name of a Danish automobile, built between 1900 and 1907. The company was based in Viborg and built only a small number of cars. Brems No. 1 Type A the 1900. The car was manufactured by Julius Brems, who started the first car factory in Denmark. The car was first tested on 5 June 1900. The car had two forward gears and a 2-cylinder engine with a top speed of approximately 26 km/h and ran around 225 km on a tank, and had a fuel efficiency of around 21 km per liter of gasoline. Julius Brems only produced eight cars, with the last one being manufactured in 1908.
