= Grovertown, Indiana =

Unincorporated community in Starke County, Indiana, United States

- Unincorporated community
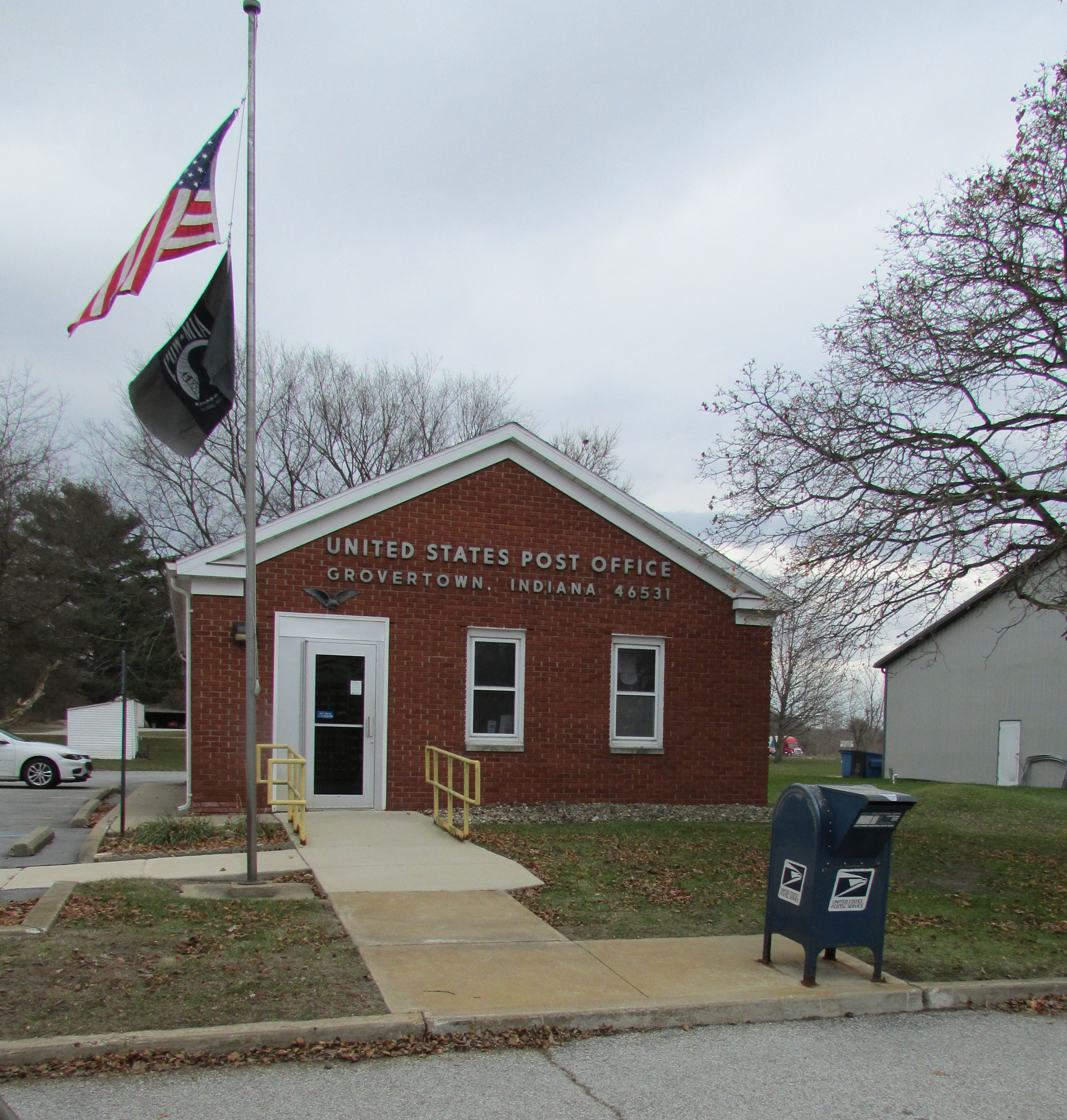
- Grovertown Post Office, December 2021

- Location within Indiana Location within the United States
- Coordinates: 41°22′30″N 86°30′17″W
- Country: United States
- State: Indiana
- County: Starke
- Township: Oregon
- Elevation: 725 ft (221 m)
- Time zone: UTC-6 (Central (CST))
  - Summer (DST): UTC-5 (CDT)
- ZIP code: 46531
- Area code: 574
- GNIS feature ID: 449664

Grovertown (also Grover Town or Grovestown) is an unincorporated community in southeastern Oregon Township, Starke County, Indiana, United States.

== History ==
Although Grovertown is unincorporated, it has a post office, with the ZIP code of 46531. The post office has been in operation since 1859. Grovertown was laid out in the year 1858. The Pittsburg, Ft. Wayne & Chicago Railroad runs through the village, which contains some two hundred inhabitants. It also home of noted philanthropist George Hanson.

== Geography ==
Grovertown lies along State Road 23 northeast of the city of Knox, the county seat of Starke County.

== Demographics ==
The United States Census Bureau delineated Grovertown as a census designated place in the 2022 American Community Survey.
