= Brems, Indiana =

- Unincorporated community
- Location within Indiana Location within the United States
- Coordinates: 41°20′21″N 86°41′51″W
- Country: United States
- State: Indiana
- County: Starke
- Township: Center
- Elevation: 679 ft (207 m)
- Time zone: UTC-6 (Central (CST))
  - Summer (DST): UTC-5 (CDT)
- ZIP code: 46534
- Area code: 574
- GNIS feature ID: 431480

Brems is an unincorporated community in Center Township, Starke County, in the U.S. state of Indiana.

== History ==
Brems was once the location of a Pottawatomie Indian encampment. It was also the early site of basic county government functions before moving to Knox. The location was previously called Jackson Island or Jackson's Island. The origin of that name is unclear, it may be named after an early settler or former President Andrew Jackson. The later-built railroad stop was called Jackson Station and subsequently renamed Nickel Plate Station. By the late 1800s the community was renamed Brems after local resident Louis Brems.

A post office was established at Brems in 1911, and remained in operation until it was discontinued in 1924. In 1920, the population of Brems was 53. The population was 50 in 1930.
