= Beardstown, Indiana =

- Unincorporated community
- Location within Indiana Location within the United States
- Coordinates: 41°08′17″N 86°36′09″W
- Country: United States
- State: Indiana
- County: Pulaski
- Township: Franklin
- Elevation: 705 ft (215 m)
- Time zone: UTC-5 (Eastern (EST))
  - Summer (DST): UTC-4 (EDT)
- ZIP code: 46996
- GNIS feature ID: 430653

Beardstown is an unincorporated community in Franklin Township, Pulaski County, in the U.S. state of Indiana.

== History ==
Beardstown was founded in 1901, and took its name from Beardstown, Illinois. A post office was established at Beardstown in 1903, and remained in operation until it was discontinued in 1905.
