= Wibke Brems =

German politician (born 1981)

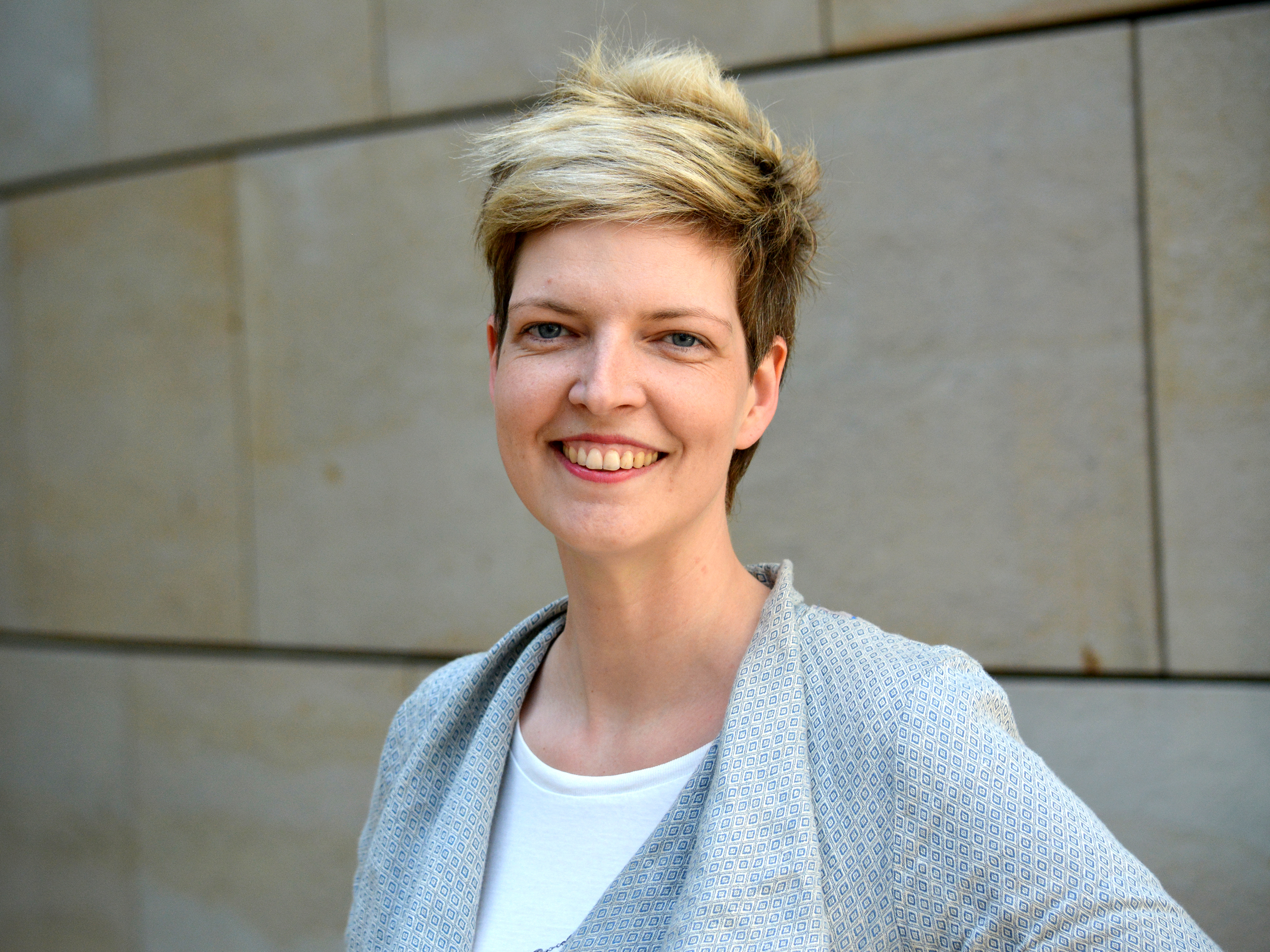
- Brems in 2018

Member of the Landtag of North Rhine-Westphalia
- Incumbent
- Assumed office 9 June 2010

Personal details
- Born: 17 February 1981 (age 45) Bremerhaven
- Party: Alliance 90/The Greens (since 1998)

Wibke Brems (born 17 February 1981 in Bremerhaven) is a German politician serving as a member of the Landtag of North Rhine-Westphalia since 2010. She has served as co-group leader of Alliance 90/The Greens since 2022.
