= Bass Lake, Indiana =

- Census-designated place
- Location of Bass Lake in Starke County, Indiana.
- Coordinates: 41°14′40″N 86°34′50″W
- Country: United States
- State: Indiana
- County: Starke
- Township: California, North Bend

Area
  - Total: 11.28 sq mi (29.21 km^{2})
  - Land: 9.09 sq mi (23.54 km^{2})
  - Water: 2.19 sq mi (5.67 km^{2})
- Elevation: 712 ft (217 m)

Population (2020)
  - Total: 1,384
  - Density: 152.3/sq mi (58.79/km^{2})
- Time zone: UTC-6 (Central (CST))
  - Summer (DST): UTC-5 (CDT)
- ZIP code: 46534
- Area code: 574
- FIPS code: 18-03610
- GNIS feature ID: 2393329

Bass Lake is a census-designated place (CDP) in California and North Bend Townships, Starke County, in the U.S. state of Indiana. As of the 2020 census, Bass Lake had a population of 1,384.

== History ==
The community was named after the nearby lake (Bass Lake) which was populated with a large number of black bass. It was formerly called Cedar Lake.

Author Lew Wallace spent significant time at Bass Lake, where he wrote portions of Ben-Hur: A Tale of the Christ (1880).

A post office was established at Bass Lake in 1892, and remained in operation until it was discontinued in 1948.

== Geography ==
The adjacent lake is distinct in that it sits atop a gentle hill, with its drainage basin sloping away from its shores.

According to the United States Census Bureau, the CDP has a total area of 11.3 square miles (29 km^{2}), of which 9.1 square miles (24 km^{2}) is land and 2.1 square miles (5.4 km^{2}) (18.95%) is water.

== Demographics ==
Historical population
Census	Pop.	Note	%±
2000	1,278		—
2010	1,195		−6.5%
2020	1,384		15.8%
2024 (est.)	983	▼	−29.0%
U.S. Decennial Census

=== 2020 census ===
As of the 2020 census, Bass Lake had a population of 1,384. The median age was 48.8 years. 18.5% of residents were under the age of 18 and 25.3% of residents were 65 years of age or older. For every 100 females there were 83.8 males, and for every 100 females age 18 and over there were 85.2 males age 18 and over.

0.0% of residents lived in urban areas, while 100.0% lived in rural areas.

There were 627 households in Bass Lake, of which 18.8% had children under the age of 18 living in them. Of all households, 48.2% were married-couple households, 19.5% were households with a male householder and no spouse or partner present, and 27.1% were households with a female householder and no spouse or partner present. About 32.3% of all households were made up of individuals and 19.0% had someone living alone who was 65 years of age or older.

There were 1,361 housing units, of which 53.9% were vacant. The homeowner vacancy rate was 2.7% and the rental vacancy rate was 12.5%.

Racial composition as of the 2020 census
Race	Number	Percent
White	1,310	94.7%
Black or African American	1	0.1%
American Indian and Alaska Native	4	0.3%
Asian	0	0.0%
Native Hawaiian and Other Pacific Islander	0	0.0%
Some other race	15	1.1%
Two or more races	54	3.9%
Hispanic or Latino (of any race)	62	4.5%

=== 2000 census ===
As of the 2000 census, there were 1,249 people, 534 households, and 365 families residing in the CDP. The population density was 136.5 inhabitants per square mile (52.7/km^{2}). There were 1,193 housing units at an average density of 130.4 per square mile (50.3/km^{2}). The racial makeup of the CDP was 98.40% White, 0.08% Native American, 0.24% Asian, 0.48% from other races, and 0.80% from two or more races. Hispanic or Latino of any race were 1.12% of the population.

There were 534 households, out of which 23.4% had children under the age of 18 living with them, 56.4% were married couples living together, 9.4% had a female householder with no husband present, and 31.5% were non-families. 27.7% of all households were made up of individuals, and 12.0% had someone living alone who was 65 years of age or older. The average household size was 2.34 and the average family size was 2.85.

In the CDP, the population was spread out, with 20.6% under the age of 18, 7.3% from 18 to 24, 24.7% from 25 to 44, 27.6% from 45 to 64, and 19.9% who were 65 years of age or older. The median age was 43 years. For every 100 females, there were 88.7 males. For every 100 females age 18 and over, there were 88.2 males.

The median income for a household in the CDP was $42,440, and the median income for a family was $47,361. Males had a median income of $37,159 versus $19,318 for females. The per capita income for the CDP was $19,407. About 10.6% of families and 14.7% of the population were below the poverty line, including 35.4% of those under age 18 and 5.5% of those age 65 or over.
