= North Bend Township, Starke County, Indiana =

North Bend Township
- Township
- Location in Starke County
- Coordinates: 41°12′50″N 86°31′38″W
- Country: United States
- State: Indiana
- County: Starke

Government
  - Type: Indiana township

Area
  - Total: 36.2 sq mi (94 km^{2})
  - Land: 35.46 sq mi (91.8 km^{2})
  - Water: 0.74 sq mi (1.9 km^{2}) 2.04%
- Elevation: 720 ft (220 m)

Population (2020)
  - Total: 1,504
  - Density: 39.3/sq mi (15.2/km^{2})
- Time zone: UTC-6 (Central (CST))
  - Summer (DST): UTC-5 (CDT)
- ZIP codes: 46511, 46534, 46960, 46968
- Area code: 574
- GNIS feature ID: 453679

North Bend Township is one of nine townships in Starke County, in the U.S. state of Indiana. As of the 2020 census, its population was 1,504 (up from 1,394 at 2010) and it contained 946 housing units.

== Geography ==
According to the 2010 census, the township has a total area of 36.2 square miles (94 km^{2}), of which 35.46 square miles (91.8 km^{2}) (or 97.96%) is land and 0.74 square miles (1.9 km^{2}) (or 2.04%) is water.

=== Cities, towns, villages ===
- Bass Lake (east half)

=== Unincorporated towns ===
- Ora at 41.173930°N 86.553065°W
- Winona at 41.236153°N 86.569456°W

(This list is based on USGS data and may include former settlements.)

=== Adjacent townships ===
- Washington Township (north)
- Union Township, Marshall County (east)
- Aubbeenaubbee Township, Fulton County (southeast)
- Tippecanoe Township, Pulaski County (south)
- Franklin Township, Pulaski County (southwest)
- California Township (west)
- Center Township (northwest)

=== Cemeteries ===
The township contains these three cemeteries: North Bend, North Union and Ora.

=== Airports and landing strips ===
- Bennett Strip Airport

=== Lakes ===
- Black Lake
- Hartz Lake
- Langenbaum Lake

=== Major highways ===
- SR 10
- SR 23

== School districts ==
- Culver Community Schools Corporation

== Political districts ==
- Indiana's 2nd congressional district
- State House District 17
- State Senate District 5
