= Tippecanoe River State Park =

State park in Pulaski County, Indiana

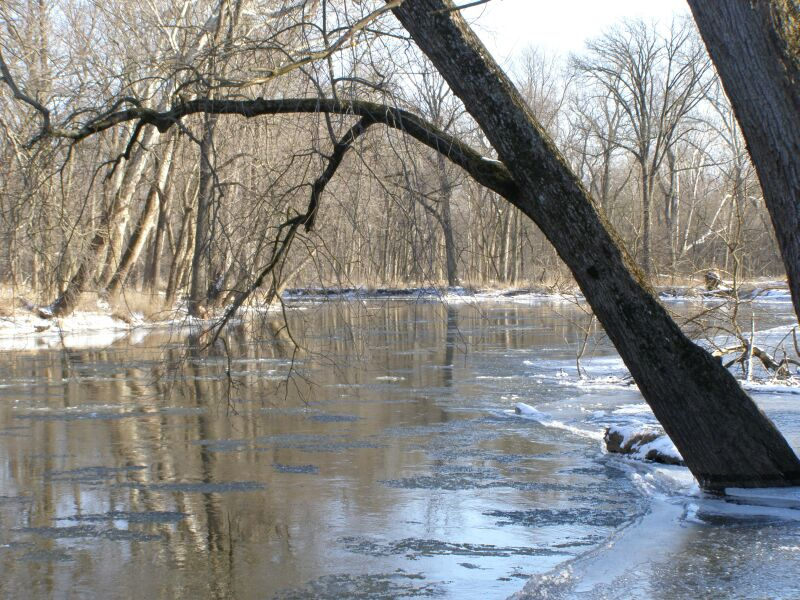

- Location within Indiana
- Location: Pulaski County, Indiana, United States
- Nearest city: Winamac, Indiana
- Coordinates: 41.1223°N 86.583°W
- Area: 2,761 acres (1,117 ha)
- Established: 1943
- Operator: Indiana Department of Natural Resources
- Visitors: 127,495 (in 2018–2019)
- Website: Official website

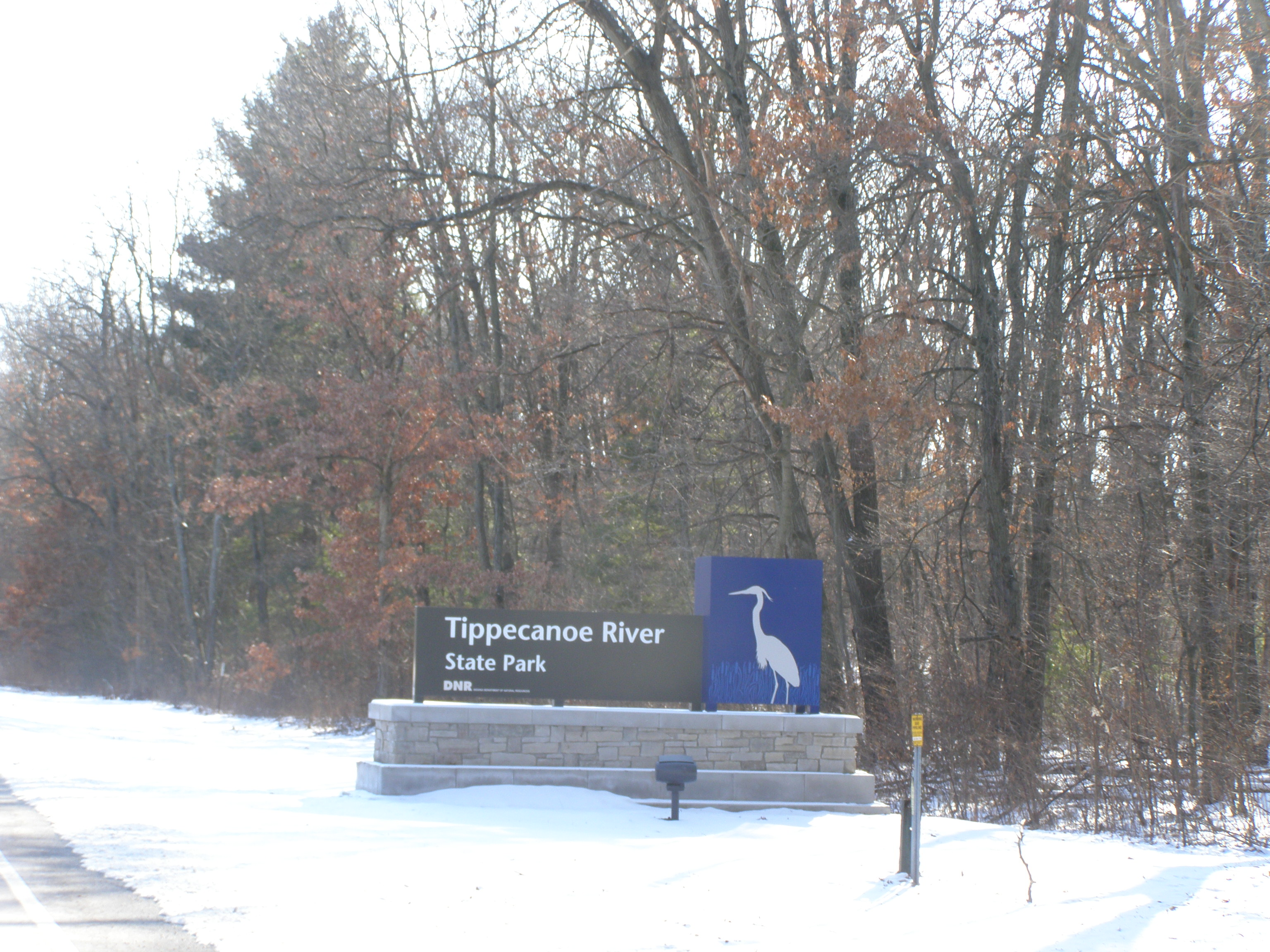

Tippecanoe River is a state park in Pulaski County, Indiana, United States. It is located 58 miles (93 km) south-southwest of South Bend, Indiana. It was formed in 1943 when the National Park Service gifted the land to Indiana's Department of Conservation land to form a state park; other land along the river becoming the Winamac Fish and Wildlife Area.

Noted for a grove of old-growth white pine trees, the park also preserves more than 2 miles (3.2 km) of undisturbed wetland shoreline on the Tippecanoe River, attracting some 127,495 visitors in 2018–2019.

== History ==
During the Great Depression of the 1930s, the national government established the Recreational Demonstration Area in the Department of the Interior, National Park Service. The Park Service located low-quality farmlands with high-quality park potential. Along the Tippecanoe River, the Federal Government purchased 7,353 acres (2,976 ha). The high sand content of the soil made these poor-quality farmlands. The riverway and forest made it quality parklands. Development of the Demonstration Area was undertaken by the Works Progress Administration. In 1943, the property was transferred to the State of Indiana's Department of Conservation as a state park. On January 1, 1959, 4,592 acres (1,858 ha) were transferred to the Division of Fish and Wildlife as the Winamac Fish and Wildlife Area. The state park retains 2,761 acres (1,117 ha) of the original development.

== River ==
Canoeing is very popular in the park, as the Tippecanoe River stretches seven miles (11 km) along the park's borders. A canoe-exclusive campsite has ten sites. It is also a river otter release area. Bluegill and bass are commonly fished from the river. The river is too dangerous for swimming, so those camping in the park can go to the Bass Lake State Beach five miles (8.0 km) away.

== Enjoying the park ==
There are ten miles (16 km) of hiking trails and thirteen miles (21 km) of horseback trails. Cultural arts programs and a seasonal naturalist are also available. Most visitors drive to the park, although pilots can land at the nearby Arens Airport and have a courtesy car take them to the park.

Things to do

- Boating – the park has a small boat launch on the river
- Camping – There are five camping experiences to choose from.
1. Family camping
2. Potawatomi Group Camp
3. Youth Tenting
4. Rent-a-camp cabin
5. Canoe camping from the river
- Fishing
- Horseback riding – trails and a primitive campground are available to horsemen and -women. There are 14.5 miles (23.3 km) of shared hiking and horse trails in the park.
- Hiking – a total of 19.1 miles (30.7 km) of trails are located throughout the park.

== Protected areas ==
- Sand Hill Nature Preserve is located at the end of the park and is accessible on Trail #8, the Bluestem Trail.
- Tippecanoe River Nature Preserve is along the river near the center of the park. It is accessible on Trail #4, the Oxbow Trail.
