= Prairie Township, LaPorte County, Indiana =

Prairie Township
- Township
- Coordinates: 41°20′08″N 86°46′35″W
- Country: United States
- State: Indiana
- County: LaPorte

Government
  - Type: Indiana township

Area
  - Total: 24 sq mi (62 km^{2})
  - Land: 24 sq mi (62 km^{2})
  - Water: 0 sq mi (0 km^{2})
- Elevation: 673 ft (205 m)

Population (2020)
  - Total: 202
  - Density: 8.7/sq mi (3.4/km^{2})
- FIPS code: 18-61596
- GNIS feature ID: 453770

Prairie Township is one of twenty-one townships in LaPorte County, Indiana. As of the 2020 census, its population was 202 (down from 209 at 2010) and it contained 86 housing units.

Prairie Township was established in 1903, when it was separated from the northern portion of Hanna Township. The land that would become Cass, Dewey, Hanna, and Prairie Townships was previously part of Starke County, under the name Van Buren Township, and was annexed to LaPorte County in 1842.

== Geography ==
According to the 2010 census, the township has a total area of 24 square miles (62 km^{2}), all land.
