= Waite (name) =

Origin
- Languages: English, Norman, German
- Origin: English
- Meaning: Watchman, Guardian, Defender, Protector
- Region of origin: Europe

Other names
- Variant forms: Wait, Wayte, Waits, Waight, Wächter,
- See also: Wilhelm/Willem/William (a name also meaning "protector"), Alexander (a name also meaning "defender")

Waite is an English surname (of Norman origin) and rarely a given name. Its variant forms include Wait, Wayte, Waits and Waight. It is derived from the old high German wahten (to keep watch); it is common in the sense of guard or watchman to all the Teutonic languages, the German wacht, Dutch vaght, Swedish vakt and English watch. When used as a verb, its meaning is "to stay in expectation of"; as a noun, it denotes a minstrel watchmen.

Waite is an occupational name for a watchman either in a town or castle from Anglo-Norman French waite ‘watchman member of the watch’ (of ancient Germanic origin; compare Wachter / Wächter).

The following are named Waite.

== Surname ==
- Arthur Edward Waite (1857–1942), British poet and scholarly mystic
- Arthur Waite (racing driver) (1894–1991), Australian racing driver
- Catharine Van Valkenburg Waite, American author, lawyer and women's suffrage activist
- C. B. Waite (1861–1927), American photographer
- Charlie Waite (born 1949), English photographer
- Charles Burlingame Waite (1824–1909), American lawyer, jurist and author
- Daisy Waite (born 2005), British-Chinese actress and model
- David Waite, Australian rugby league coach
- Davis Hanson Waite (1825–1901), governor of Colorado
- Edgar Ravenswood Waite, Australian zoologist
- Edward Wilkins Waite (1854–1924), English landscape painter
- Fred Waite (1853–1895), American cowboy, member of Billy the Kid's gang and later Chickasaw Nation legislator and attorney general
- Fred Waite (politician) (1885–1952), New Zealand soldier and politician
- Genevieve Waite (1948–2019), South African actress, singer and model
- Grant Waite (born 1964), New Zealand golfer
- Henry Waite (disambiguation)
- Jahmali Waite (born 1998), American soccer goalkeeper
- James Waite (footballer, born 1999), Welsh footballer
- Jamie Waite (born 1986), Thai football goalkeeper
- Jarrad Waite (born 1983), former Australian rules footballer
- Jimmy Waite (born 1969), Canadian ice hockey coach and goaltender
- Jodie Waite (born 2004), Irish wheelchair basketball player
- John Waite (disambiguation)
- Joseph Waite (alive in 1893 in England), a Latin and Greek scholar who edited the book Latin and Greek verse by Thomas Saunders Evans
- Keith Waite (1927–2014), New Zealand-born English editorial cartoonist
- Linda Waite, American sociologist and social demographer
- Martin Waite (born 1971), Scottish former international rugby union player
- Matthew Waite (born 1995), English cricketer
- Mitchell Waite (born 1946), author of books on electronics and computing
- Morrison Waite (1816–1888), American attorney, jurist, politician, and chief justice of the U.S. Supreme Court
- Nicholas Waite (died c. 1715), English governor of Bombay
- Norman Waite (1898–1970), English footballer
- P. B. Waite (1922–2020), Canadian historian
- Pete Waite, American volleyball coach
- Peter Waite (philanthropist) (1834–1922), South Australian pastoralist, businessman, company director and philanthropist
- Ralph Waite (1928–2014), American actor, best known for the role of John Walton on the TV series The Waltons
- Reginald Waite, Royal Air Force officer
- Ric Waite (1933–2012), American cinematographer
- Sadie Waite (born 2004), Canadian soccer player
- Terry Waite (born 1939), British human rights activist and author
- Thomas Waite (regicide) (died 1688), English Member of Parliament and one of the regicides of King Charles I
- Thomas Waite (civil servant) (1718–1780), Under-Secretary for Ireland
- Tommy Waite (born 1972), Northern Irish boxer

== Given name ==
- Waite Hoyt (1899–1984), American Major League Baseball pitcher
- Waite Phillips (1883–1964), American petroleum businessman and philanthropist
- Waite Stirling (1829–1923), English missionary and first Anglican bishop of the Falkland Islands

== Fictional characters ==
- Asenath and Ephraim Waite, in "The Thing on the Doorstep", an H.P. Lovecraft short story

== See also ==
- Governor Waite (disambiguation)
- Justice Waite (disambiguation)
- Senator Waite (disambiguation)
- Weight (surname)
- Waite (disambiguation)
- Waight
