= Mary S. Washburn =

American sculptor

- Born: Mary S. Washburn; 1868; Star City, Indiana
- Died: October 1932 (aged 63–64)
- Known for: sculpture

For the American sprinter, see Mary Washburn.

Mary S. Washburn (1868 – October 1932) was an American sculptor. Deaf from age sixteen, Washburn studied at the Art Institute of Chicago and built a successful career creating sculptures and medallions. Her most significant work is a 1909 bust of Charles Burlingame Waite, located at Rock Creek Cemetery in Washington, D.C.

== Early life and education ==
Mary Washburn was born in Star City, Indiana, in 1868, and grew up in Rensselaer, Indiana. She was deafened after a bout of scarlet fever at age sixteen.

Washburn returned to her public high school and graduated with her class. She attended Butler College in Indianapolis through her sophomore year in 1889. She struggled to adjust to college life and communicate with teachers and other students; she took lessons in lipreading and learned to use her residual hearing to the best of her ability.

== Art education and career ==
Washburn took courses in drawing and commercial art in Cincinnati, then moved to Chicago. After traveling to Europe to study artistic classics, she began attending the Art Institute of Chicago. At the Art Institute, she studied under Lorado Taft and Charles Mulligan. She spent many evenings practicing anatomy drawings in the library and sketching skeletons and musculature models in the art studios.

Her first commissioned work was a sculpture of Union Civil War general Robert H. Milroy in her hometown of Rensselaer; the statue stands at the former site of his homestead. Many exhibits followed at the Art Institute and at exhibitions in Chicago, Indianapolis, Philadelphia, and other cities. Washburn decided to resign from taking commercial art orders so she could focus on sculpture.

Washburn created the Waite Memorial for Charles Burlingame Waite and Catharine Van Valkenburg Waite after his death in 1909. Located at Rock Creek Cemetery in Washington, D.C., the memorial features a bronze bust of Charles and a circular bronze relief portrait of Catharine. During a third visit to Paris, Washburn studied under master sculptor Edwin Sawyer, learning to sculpt medals and medallions. One of her sketches was accepted at the Old Salon of Paris in 1913, and she exhibited her works at the Paris Allied Artists Association.

At the 1915 Panama–Pacific International Exposition, Washburn received an award. She also exhibited at the Oakland Art Gallery in 1927. Her artwork can be found in multiple institutions across the United States, including the Carnegie Institute.

She died in October 1932.
