= Henry Waite =

Henry Waite may refer to:

- Henry Chester Waite (1830–1912), American lawyer, banker, and politician
- Henry Matson Waite (engineer) (1869–1944), engineer and the city manager of Dayton, Ohio
- Henry Matson Waite (judge) (1787–1869), lawyer, judge, and chief justice of the Connecticut Supreme Court
- Henry Randall Waite (1845–1909), American editor and clergyman
- H. Roy Waite (1883–1978), pioneer in aviation

== See also ==
- Henry Waitt (died 1902), American businessman
