= Charles Alfred Wilson =

American civil engineer (1855–1935)

- Born: April 4, 1855; Cecil County, Maryland, US
- Died: June 3, 1935 (aged 80)
- Education: Civil engineering
- Spouse: Carrie Stevens Wilson (m. 1883; died 1919)
- Children: One son
- Engineering career
- Discipline: Civil engineering
- Employer: Philadelphia and Reading railroad
- Projects: Cincinnati Union Terminal, Philadelphia, Newtown and New York railway, Wheeling and Lake Erie railway
- Significant design: Cincinnati Union Terminal

Charles Alfred Wilson (April 4, 1855 – June 3, 1935) was a leading nineteenth-century American railroad engineer and civil engineer. He was born in Conowingo, Maryland. Wilson married Carrie Ione Stevens Wilson (1858–1919) in 1883, and they had one child, Hamilton Wilson.

His signature project was the Cincinnati Union terminal project, where Wilson, as a consulting engineer, worked with Henry M. Waite, the chief engineer, to direct the work of about 100 engineers and assistants to come up with seven engineering studies for the terminal. In 1935, the American Society of Civil Engineers recognized Wilson as one of its most knowledgeable railroad engineers.

== Early life and career ==
Charles Alfred Wilson was born on April 4, 1855, to John Howard Wilson and Anna Cheyney Wilson in Conowingo, Maryland. John Wilson was also a civil engineer who worked on railroads during his career and died in Missouri in 1886. Wilson married Carrie Ione Stevens Wilson in 1883, and they had one child, Hamilton Wilson.

== Cincinnati Union Terminal ==
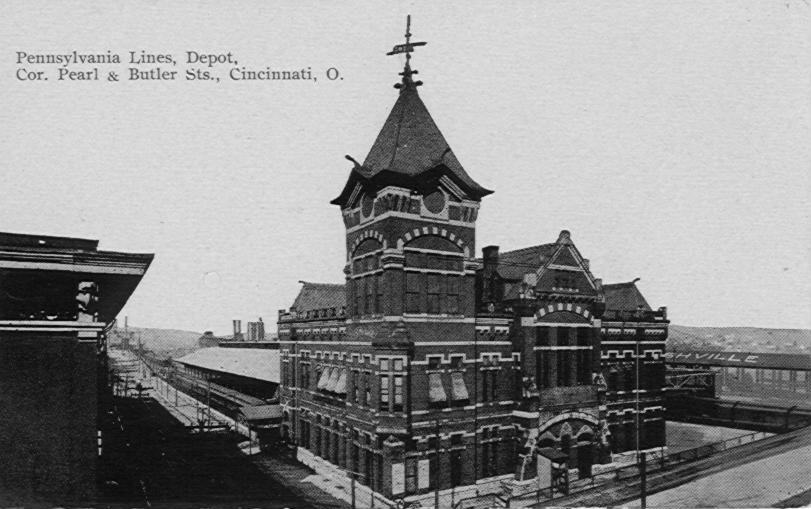
Pennsylvania Station, one of five replaced by Union Terminal

Cincinnati was a major center of railroad traffic in the late 19th and early 20th century, especially as an interchange point between railroads serving the Northeastern and Midwestern states with railroads serving the South. The city's stations were not effective for interchanges: only one of Cincinnati's seven railroads operated through the city; for all the others, Cincinnati was a terminal point. For travelers passing through the city by rail they would often have to travel between two of the city's five stations, forcing them to navigate local transit themselves. It also required companies like the Louisville and Nashville Railroad to split their operations between two stations. Additionally, the stations were cramped because they were not large enough to support the city's passenger traffic. Cincinnati's stations were also located close to the Ohio River, which was prone to flooding and would frequently render the buildings useless. After the Great Flood of 1884, railroad presidents began seeking one major terminal located far from the river.

Committees of railroad executives were formed to discuss the topic on numerous occasions between 1908 and 1923. Wilson was hired by the railroad companies to plan the terminal, creating several schematics between 1912 and 1923. In 1923, the Cincinnati Railroad Development Company was created to spur creation of the terminal and assess its feasibility; former Philip Carey Company president George Dent Crabbs became its president.

During the midst of planning, the Depression of 1920–21 and World War I interrupted efforts to create the Union station. A final agreement for a union station among the seven railroads that served Cincinnati and the city itself was not achieved until July 1927, after intense lobbying and negotiations, led by Crabbs. The seven railroads–the Baltimore and Ohio Railroad; Chesapeake and Ohio Railway; New York Central Railroad (through its subsidiary, the Cleveland, Cincinnati, Chicago and St. Louis Railway, or "the Big Four"); Louisville and Nashville Railroad; Norfolk and Western Railway; Pennsylvania Railroad; and the Southern Railway–select a site for their new station in the West End, near the Mill Creek. Four of the seven railroads already utilized the Mill Creek Valley, which naturally lent itself as a good site for a terminal. At the time, the Southern Railway had a train yard and local freight terminal at the site. Wilson, working as a consulting engineer with Henry M. Waite, Chief Engineer, organized about 100 engineers and assistants, and came up with seven design studies, labeled A through H, of different track and building layouts in the Mill Creek valley. These ranged from the most costly, at $55.6 million, to the cheapest and chosen option, H, at $39.5 million.

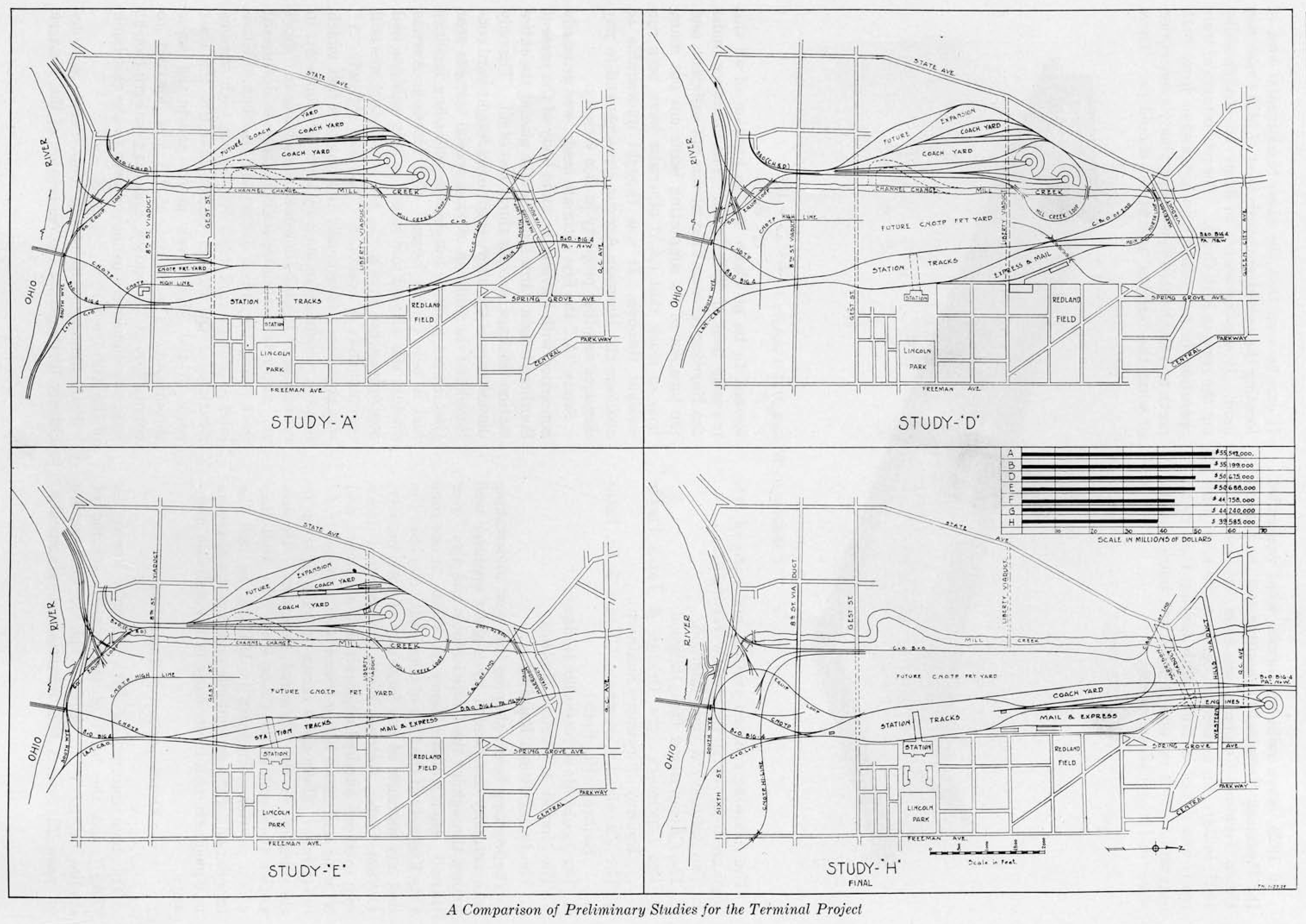
Studies for possible station and track configurations

Site and track layout selection, January 1929

== Legacy and death ==
When Wilson died in 1935, the American Society of Civil Engineers considered him to be one of its "most knowledgeable railroad men". His signature project, the Union Terminal was nominated for National Historic Landmark status in 1974 and recognized in 1977.

Wilson died on June 3, 1935.
