= History of Cincinnati Union Terminal =

History of Cincinnati, Ohio's rail terminal

External videos
- Saving Union Terminal, WCPO-TV, 2018

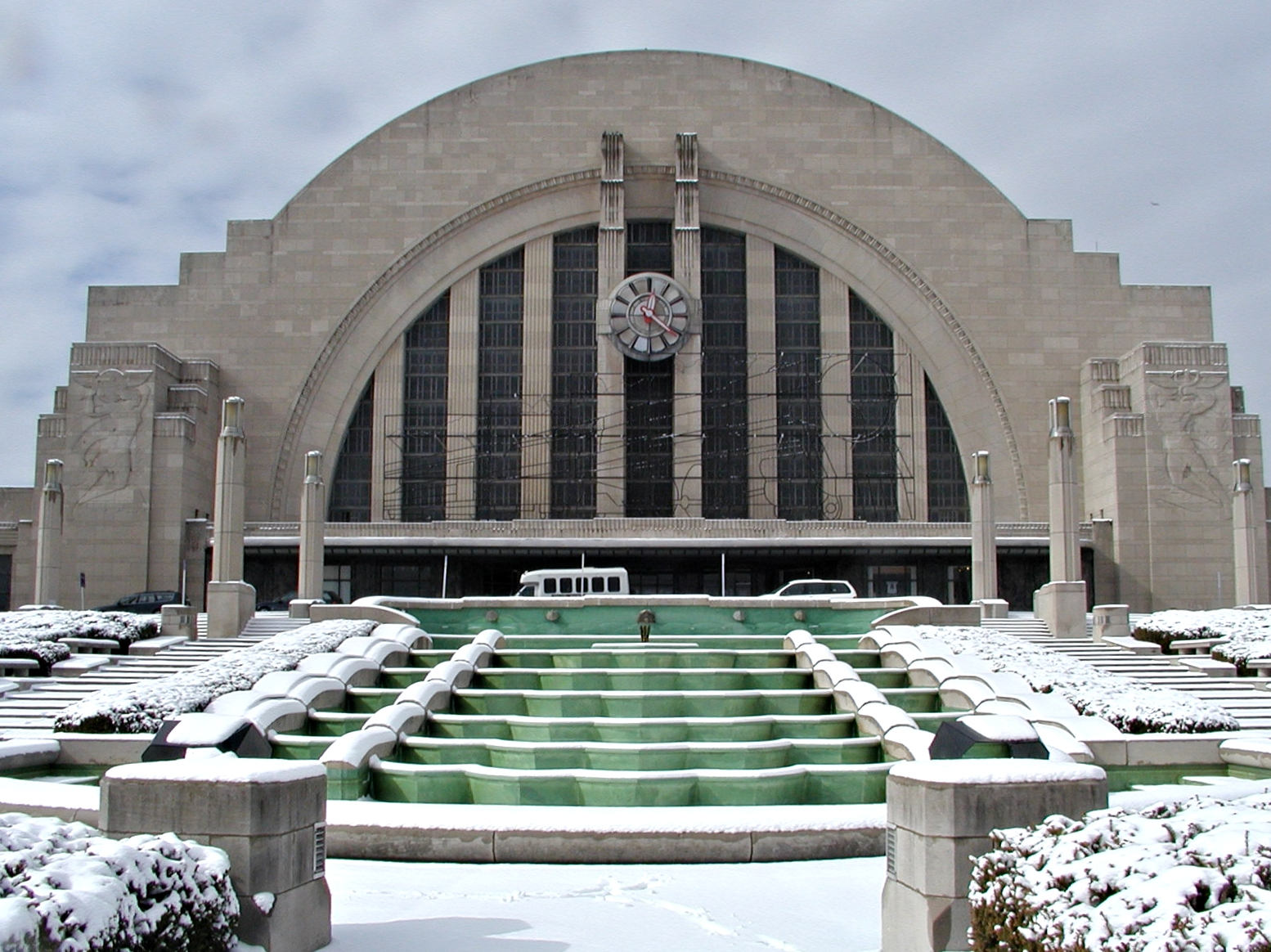
Union Terminal's east facade

Cincinnati Union Terminal is an intercity train station and museum center in the Queensgate neighborhood of Cincinnati, Ohio. It opened in 1933 as a union station to replace five train stations serving seven railroads in the city. Passenger service ceased in 1972, and the station concourse was demolished. From 1980 to 1985, the building housed a shopping mall. In 1991, the terminal saw the opening of the Cincinnati Museum Center and the return of Amtrak service.

== Overview ==
The terminal was developed throughout the 1920s to replace five train stations that served seven railroads. The cramped stations, close to the Ohio River, were prone to flooding. The Great Flood of 1884, one of the largest floods at that time, particularly prompted efforts to consolidate services in a new terminal. Numerous committees developed plans between 1908 and 1923, but construction only started in 1928. The project involved creation of viaducts, mail and express buildings, and utility structures: a power plant, water treatment facility, and roundhouse. The station building's site necessitated demolishing numerous structures and relandscaping and repurposing Lincoln Park. While construction was taking place, the design plans evolved. The architectural firm Fellheimer & Wagner originally conceived a conservative design, though the terminal's development company urged the firm to hire Paul Philippe Cret in 1930, and the terminal's Art Deco design is credited to him. The design, more modern and cheerful, came along with cost savings over the originally planned intricate designs.

The station opened on March 19, 1933. It was initially underused, as the Great Depression reduced passenger travel. World War II passenger traffic increased significantly, and three United Service Organizations recreation centers opened for troops to use within the terminal. In the next two decades after the war, passenger use declined significantly, as Americans had taken to affordable automobiles and airplanes for long-distance travel. A science museum opened in 1968, offsetting some of the building's maintenance costs until it closed in 1970. Amtrak, the national railroad service, was formed in 1971 to rescue declining railroad companies. Amtrak recognized significant operating costs and moved its Cincinnati services to stop at the smaller, new River Road station in 1972. The station's concourse, platforms, and tracks were sold to the Southern Railway for freight operations. The company tore down the terminal's concourse in 1974, after giving the community time to save its artwork. Starting in 1978, a shopping mall was built within the terminal, opening in 1980, though the last tenant left by 1985. Around this time, the Cincinnati Historical Society and Cincinnati Museum of Natural History were looking for new museum space, and led the county to approve funding to transform the building into a museum. The renovation restored some original spaces and included creation of the museum's Omnimax theater. The museum center officially opened in 1991, and its renovations spurred Amtrak to return service to the terminal that year. In 1998, the Cinergy Children's Museum joined the Cincinnati Museum Center. In 2016, the county funded an extensive renovation throughout the building, also supported by grants, donations, and tax credits. The two-year renovation cleaned and repaired artwork, the main exterior clock, the plaza and fountain, walls, and roofs. Following reopening, in early 2019, the Nancy & David Wolf Holocaust and Humanity Center became an additional museum tenant at Union Terminal.

Today, the terminal is served by Amtrak's Cardinal line, passing through Cincinnati three times weekly. The building's largest tenants are the Cincinnati Museum Center, a group of three museums, a library, and a theater, as well as the Holocaust & Humanity Center.

== Background ==
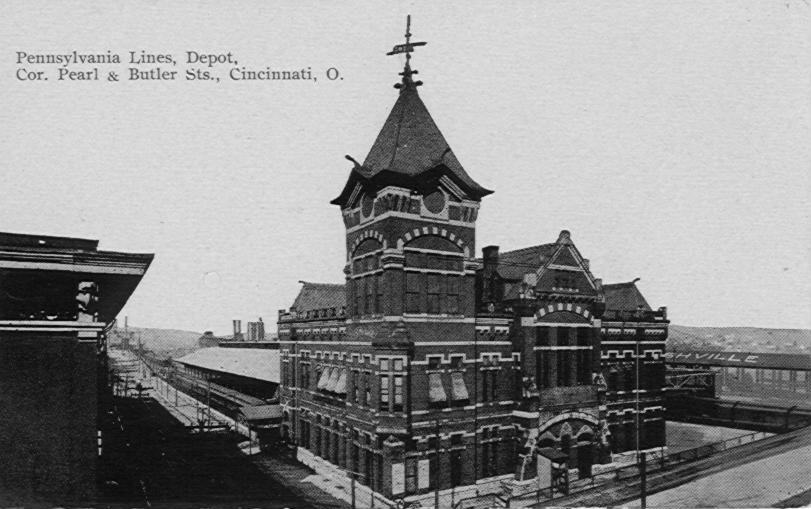
Pennsylvania Station, one of five replaced by Union Terminal

Cincinnati was a major center of railroad traffic in the late 19th and early 20th century, especially as an interchange point between railroads serving the Northeastern and Midwestern states with railroads serving the South. The city's stations were not effective for interchanges: only one of Cincinnati's seven railroads operated through the city; for all the others Cincinnati was a terminal point. For travelers passing through the city by rail, they would often have to travel between two of the city's five stations, forcing them to navigate local transit themselves. It also required companies like the Louisville and Nashville Railroad to split its operations between two stations. Additionally, the stations were cramped, because they were not large enough to support the city's passenger traffic. Cincinnati's stations were also located close to the Ohio River, which was prone to flooding and would frequently render the buildings useless. After the Great Flood of 1884, railroad presidents began seeking one major terminal located far from the river. Alderman Robert J. O'Brien was also an advocate for a unified railway station for the city.

Committees of railroad executives formed to discuss the topic on numerous occasions between 1908 and 1923. Charles A. Wilson was hired by the railroad companies to plan the terminal; he created several schematics between 1912 and 1923. In 1923, the Cincinnati Railroad Development Company was created to spur creation of the terminal and assess its feasibility; former Philip Carey Company president George Dent Crabbs became its president. During the midst of planning, the Depression of 1920–21 and World War I interrupted efforts to create the union station. A final agreement for a union station among the seven railroads that served Cincinnati and the city itself was not achieved until July 1927, after intense lobbying and negotiations, led by Crabbs. The seven railroads–the Baltimore and Ohio Railroad; Chesapeake and Ohio Railway; New York Central Railroad (through its subsidiary, the Cleveland, Cincinnati, Chicago and St. Louis Railway, or "the Big Four"); Louisville and Nashville Railroad; Norfolk and Western Railway; Pennsylvania Railroad; and the Southern Railway–selected a site for their new station in the West End, near the Mill Creek. Four of the seven railroads already utilized the Mill Creek Valley, which naturally lent itself as a good site for a terminal. At the time, the Southern Railway had a train yard and local freight terminal at the site. Henry M. Waite, Chief Engineer, and Charles Wilson, Consulting Engineer, organized about 100 engineers and assistants, and came up with seven studies, labeled A through H, of different track and building layouts in the Mill Creek valley. These ranged from the most costly, at $55.6 million, to the cheapest and chosen option, H, at $39.5 million.

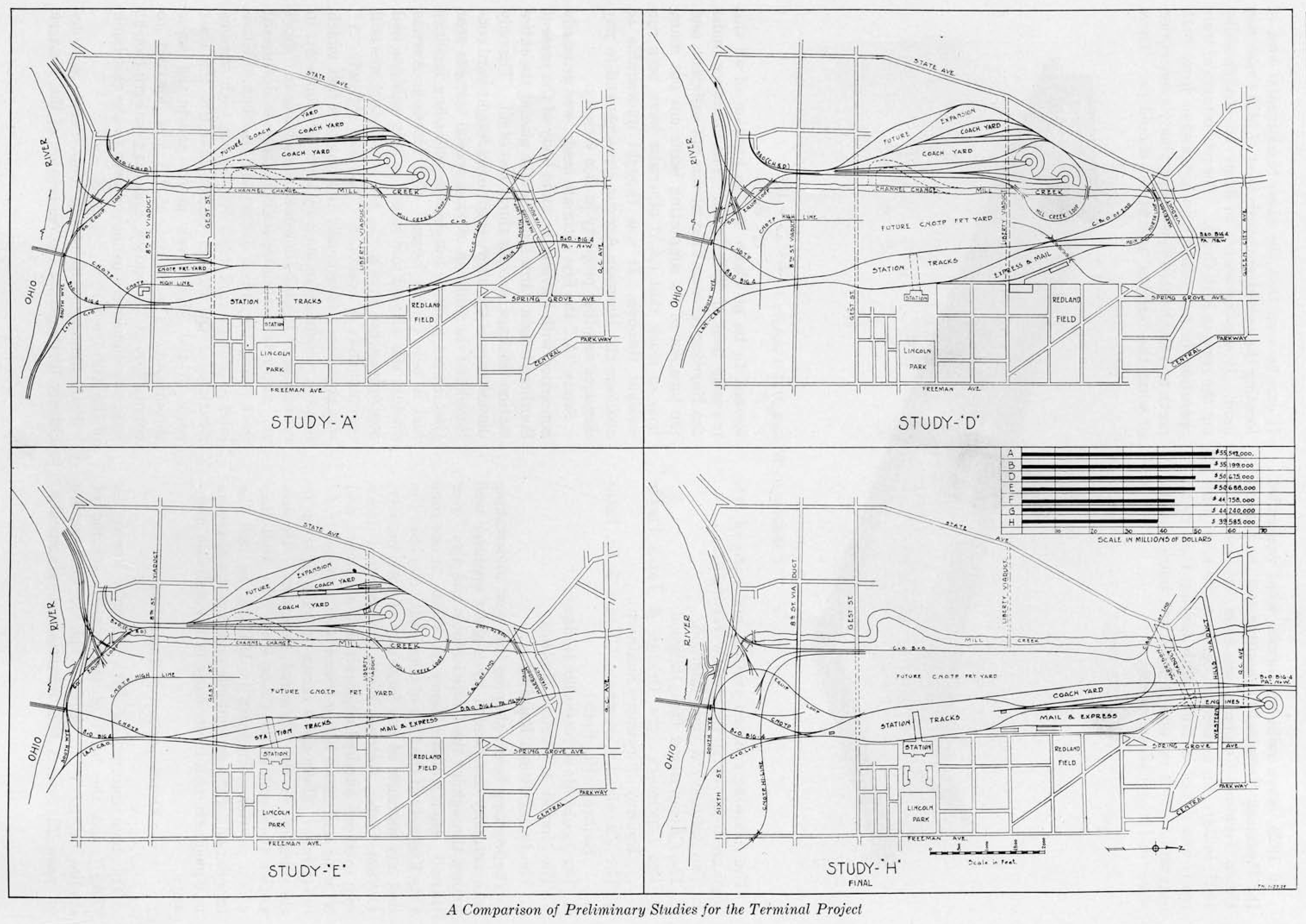
Studies for possible station and track configurations

Site and track layout selection, January 1929

== Design considerations and Art Deco origins ==
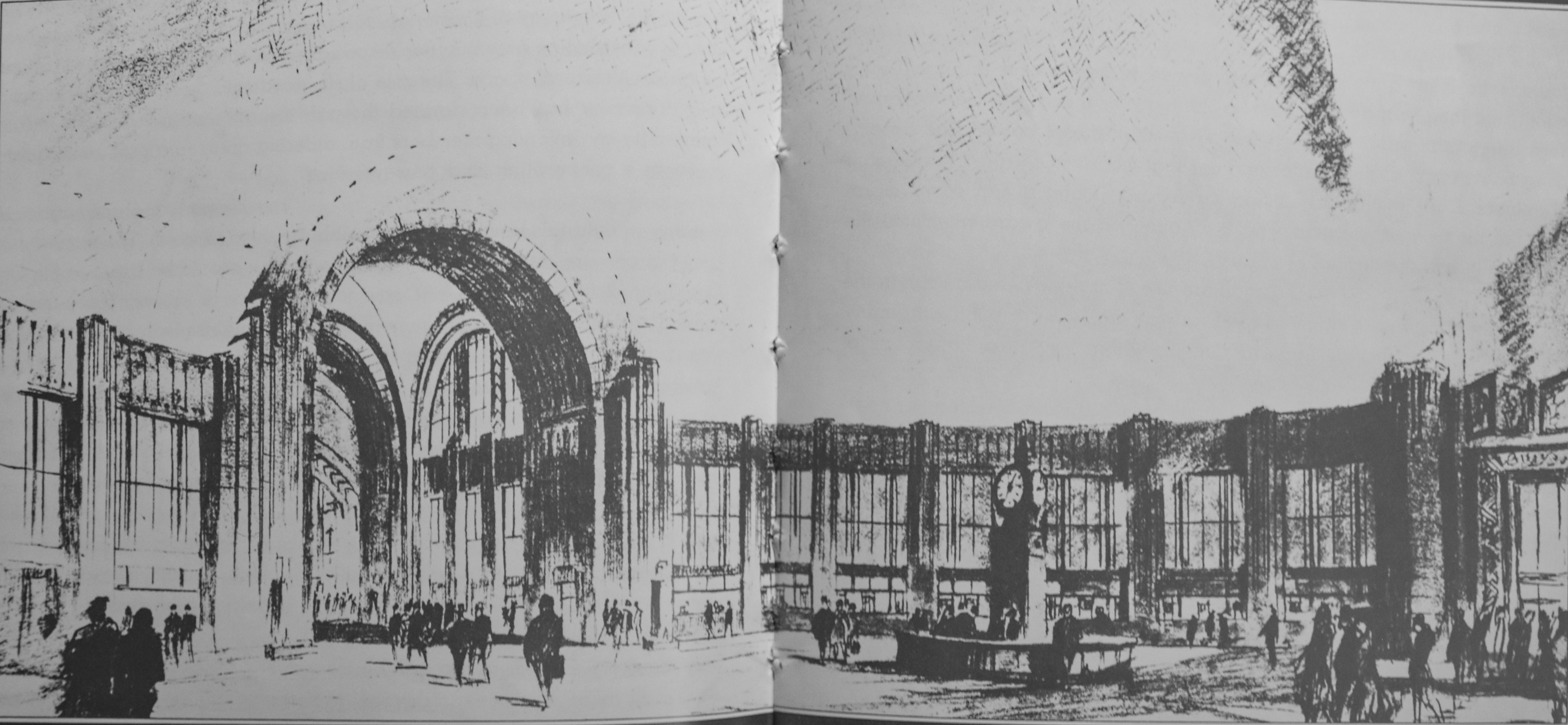
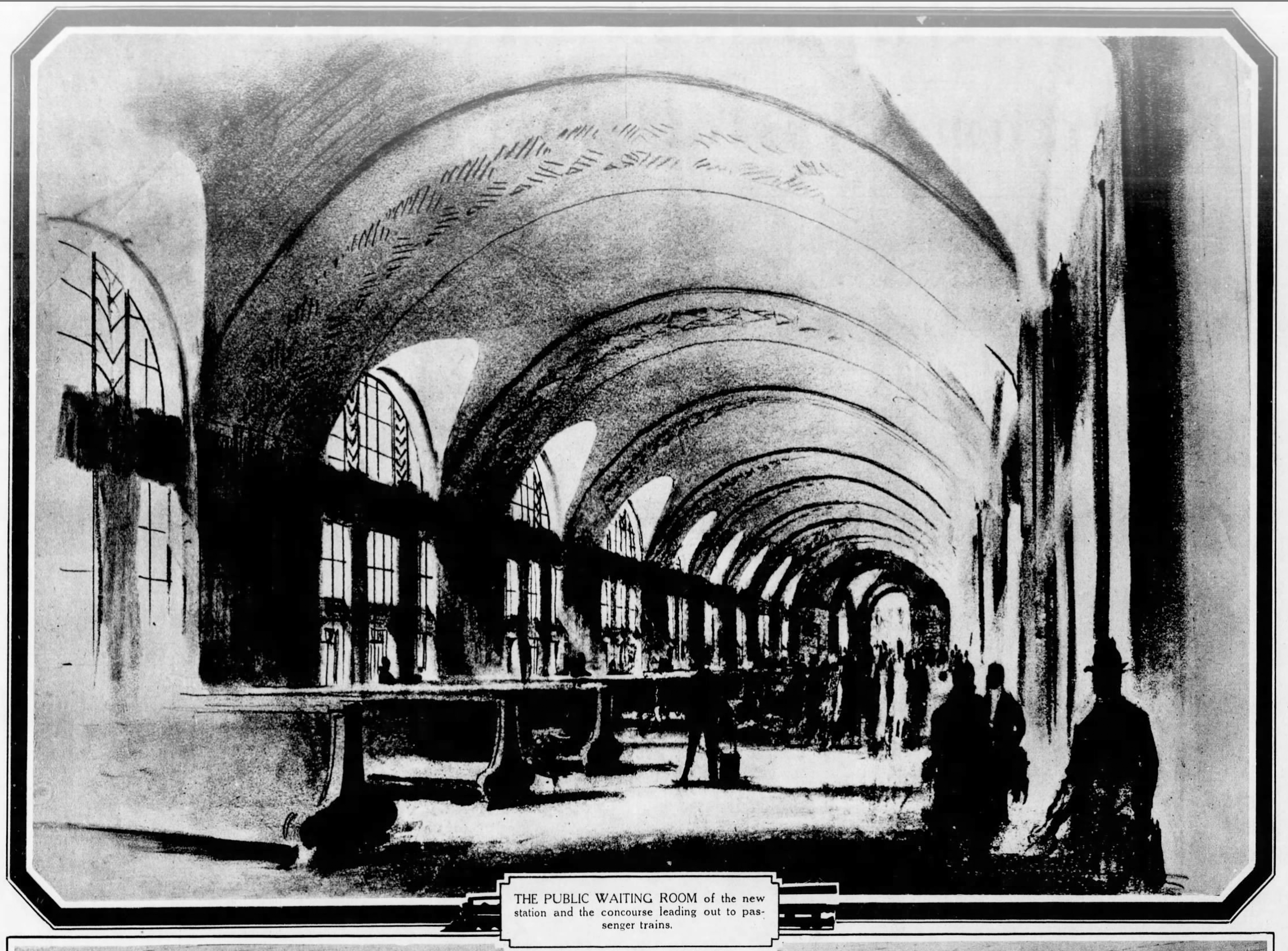
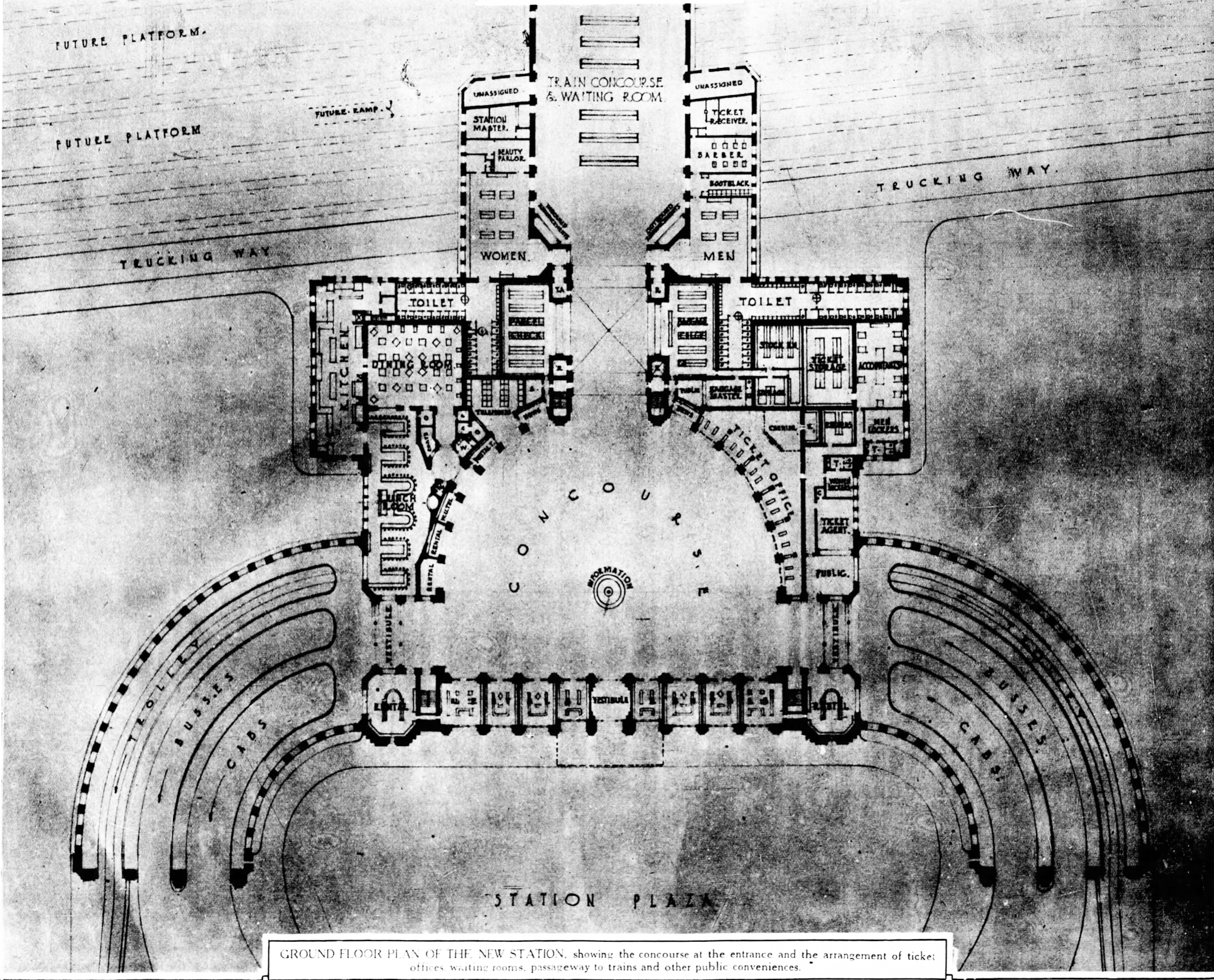
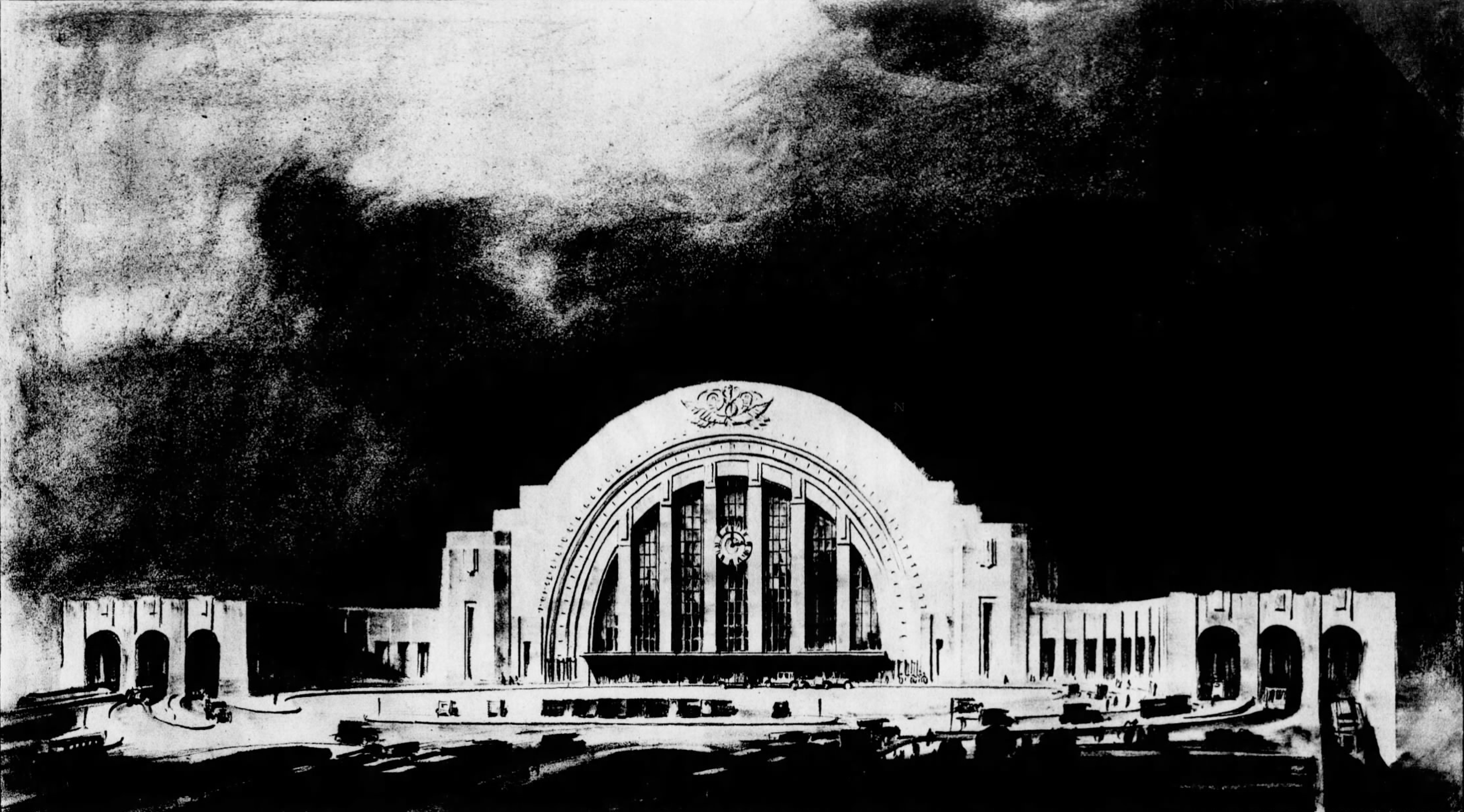
June 1929 sketches: rotunda, concourse, floor plan, and facade

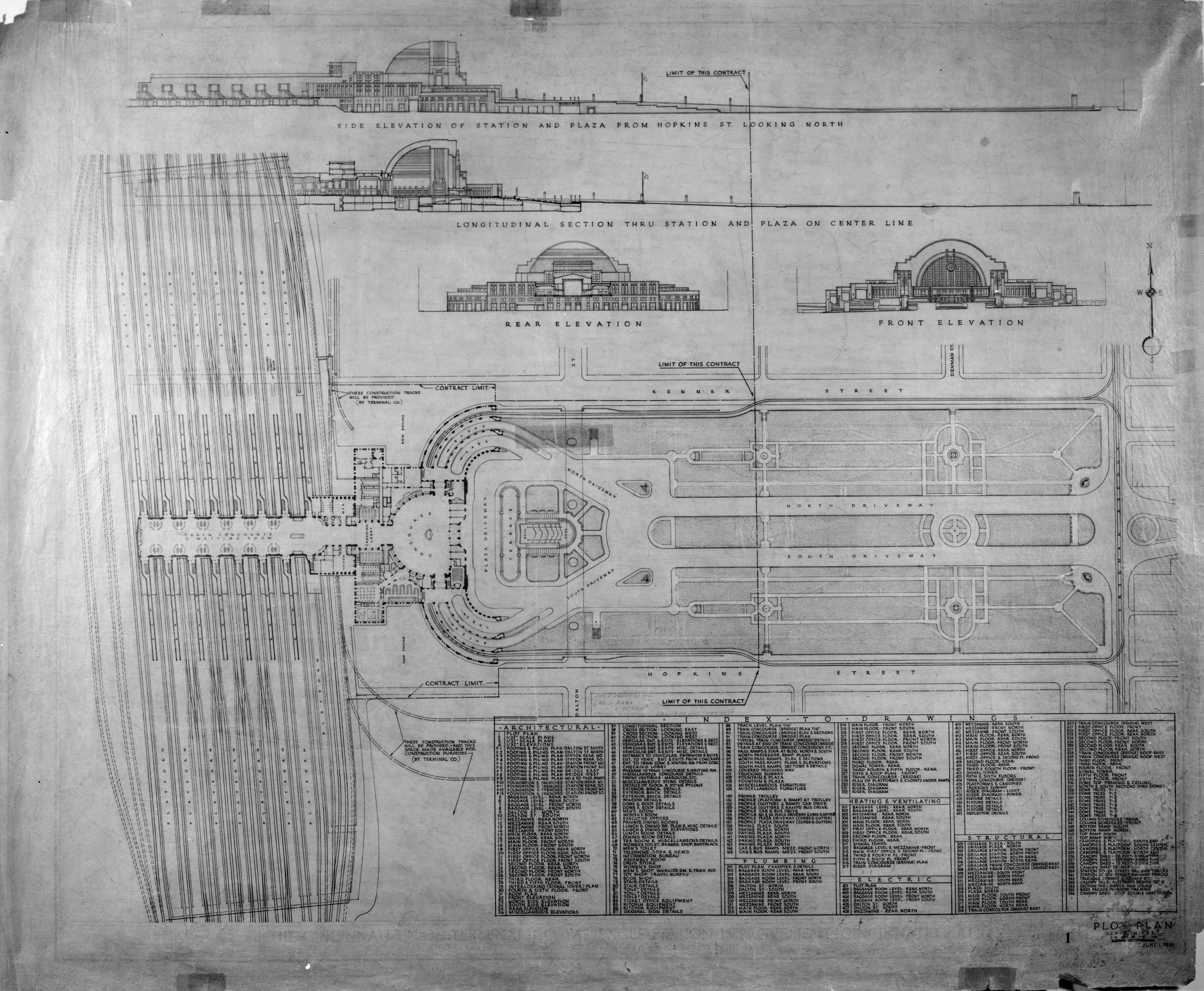
June 1931 elevation and floor plan drawings

After a limited architectural competition, the firm Fellheimer & Wagner was commissioned to design the terminal in June 1928, shortly after completing their work on Buffalo Central Terminal. The firm first released plans for the terminal in June 1929. The sketches showed a conservative design, utilizing large Gothic arches, vaulted ceilings, and conventional benches in long rows. The originally proposed shape of the rotunda and concourse were the same as the finished product, though the details of the design more closely resembled the architects' Buffalo Central Terminal. The main exterior facade was presented in a similar way to the final product, however somewhat less modern in its details. At this point, most other details of the structure were the same: the semi-circular bus, taxi, and streetcar ramps, the relandscaping of Lincoln Park, and the relative locations of all the rooms in the building. The building was then estimated to cost $8 million, with the total project costing $40.6 million.

There were persistent changes in the blueprints between 1931 and 1932, indicating the involvement of an architect outside the firm's regular staff, like Paul Philippe Cret, employed as an aesthetic advisor. He is attributed with the terminal's Art Deco design due to his similar-style designs of other buildings at the time. His submission of a plan for the Chrysler Exhibition Building, in the 1933 Century of Progress world's fair, has numerous similarities to the terminal's final plan and design.

The new Art Deco design was approved with its proposed cost savings in mind; an issue the terminal company valued as the Great Depression continued on. Henry Waite said that the first Neoclassical plan would have been cold and costly, and that the new structure was plain, but brightened with color along lines of modern decoration and art. The architects first tried a moderate color scheme, which had a depressing effect. They then decided the terminal should be bright and cheery, like the flowers and birds of the open country. They reported that the effect was joyous and stimulating.

Pierre Bourdelle may have been considered to design all art in the terminal, as he made sketches for art throughout the entire terminal. Winold Reiss, who may have been introduced to the project by Paul Philippe Cret, used his source material more faithfully. That may have been significant in Reiss's selection for the final works. Reiss ended up designing nearly all of the terminal's artwork, including over 18,150 square feet (1,686 m^{2}) of mosaic murals.

== Construction ==
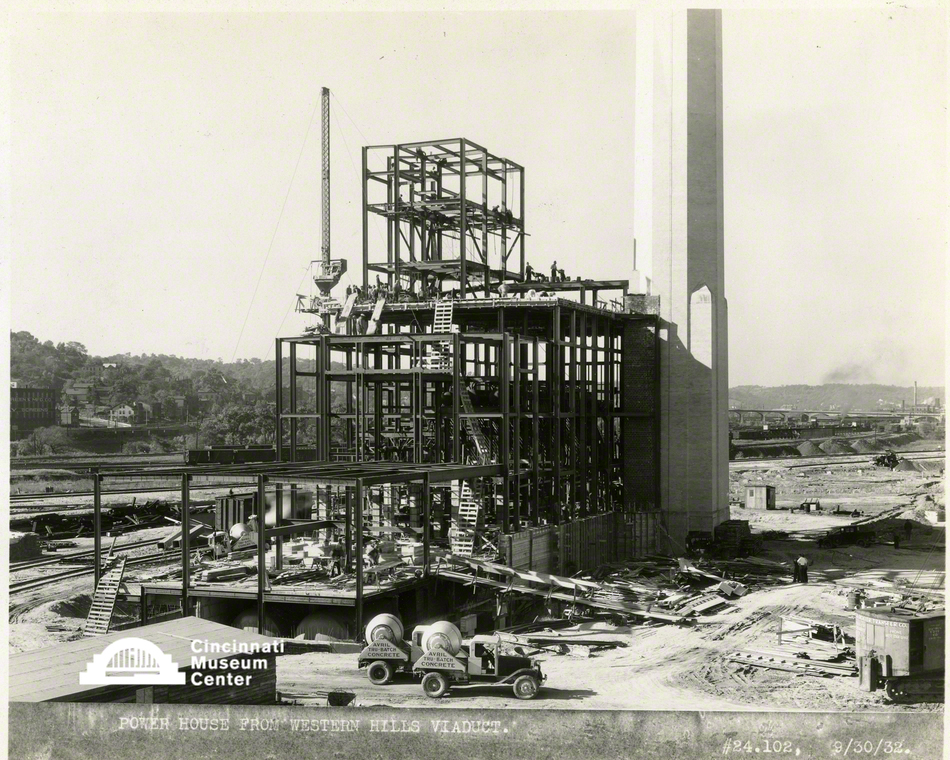
Power house construction, 1932

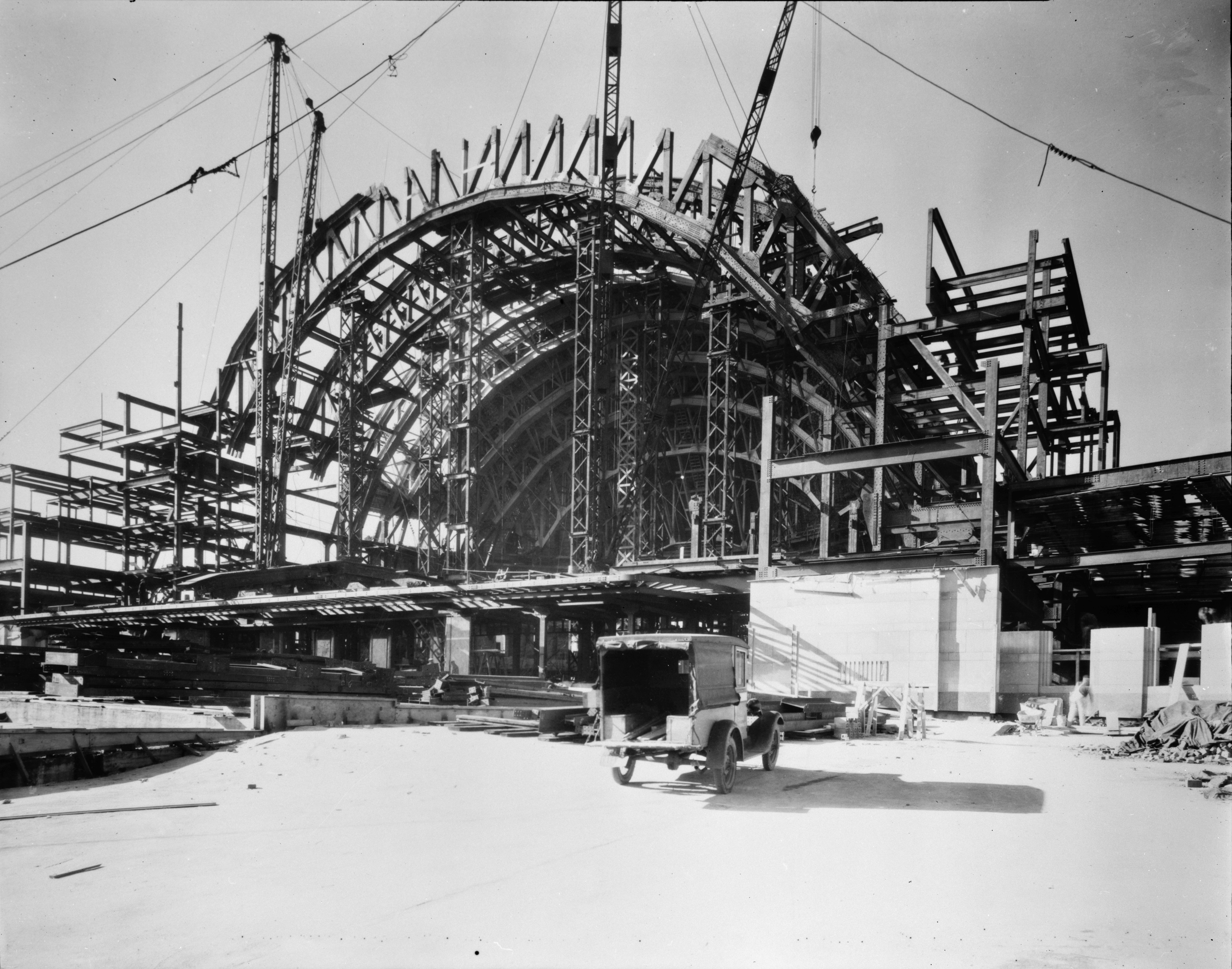
Structural framing of the terminal's dome

The Union Terminal Company was created on July 14, 1927, to build the terminal, railroad lines in and out, and other related transportation improvements. Construction began in 1928 with the regrading of the east flood plain of the Mill Creek to a point nearly level with the surrounding city, an effort that required 5.5 million cubic yards (4.2 million cubic metres) of landfill. Elevation was a serious concern, as all older stations in Cincinnati had experienced regular flooding from the Ohio River. The new terminal's main level was to be built at 522 feet above sea level. The terminal company purchased a hill nearby, locally known as Bald Knob, for the landfill. Material at Bald Knob was discovered to be thin strata of fossil limestone, imbedded with clay and weak shale, which did not consolidate properly. This led the terminal company to abandon the site and to use material from a gravel pit in Miamitown.

Other work included the construction of mail and express terminals, an engine terminal, power house, coach yard, viaducts over the Mill Creek, and the railroad approaches to Union Terminal. The new viaducts the Union Terminal Company created to cross the Mill Creek Valley included the Waldvogel Viaduct and the well-built Western Hills Viaduct. Out of all structures built for the complex, the Western Hills Viaduct was considered only second to the terminal building in its design.

Construction on the terminal building itself began in August 1929, shortly before the Great Depression started. At the time, much of its site was used for yard tracks, a public dump, houses, grain silos, an ice warehouse, and a city park, Lincoln Park. The terminal company transformed the park, which had a sunken garden, lake and island, into the terminal's lush entrance drive. The Lincoln Park Grounds or Union Grounds was an adjacent baseball field, removed for installation of the terminal and plaza. The terminal company also bought multiple lots, many unoccupied, and altered or tore down many buildings in order to construct tracks, reportedly numbering 276. The project involved widening the streets around the station, in anticipation of increased traffic. Buildings were also demolished to widen the principal street, first known as Laurel Street, renamed Terminal Approach or Terminal Parkway in 1932, renamed Lincoln Park Drive by 1935, and given its current name, Ezzard Charles Drive, in 1976. Laurel Street Park was constructed along the street in 1931 in exchange for the loss of Lincoln Park. The park is now known simply as Laurel Park, potentially due to the street's name changing.

The cornerstone was laid on November 20, 1931, with Cincinnati mayor Russell Wilson laying mortar for it with a silver trowel. Construction was finished six months ahead of schedule, in March 1933 instead of September. The final cost of the project was $41.5 million. The terminal was put into emergency operation on March 19, 1933, because of another Ohio River flood, which created the need for emergency supplies and workers, and forced the closure of four of the five existing Cincinnati stations. The five existing stations in Cincinnati were forced to close. The first train to utilize the station was Southern Railroad Engine 6455 on March 19, headed for Chattanooga, Tennessee.

The official opening of the station was on March 31, 1933, and Mayor Wilson dedicated the building, opening the doors ceremoniously with a gold key presented by the Union Terminal Company president H. A. Worcester. It was estimated that 50,000 people attended the event, including the architects, former mayor Murray Seasongood, Governor George White, chief engineer Henry M. Waite, and terminal company vice president George Dent Crabbs. The event included a public viewing of the terminal, a concert, and other ceremonial events, and was followed with a large public banquet at the Netherland Plaza's Hall of Mirrors. At this event, B&O director John J. Cornwell notably stated that passenger stations were declining in use, and that the building's completion came after its need had passed.

The terminal's opening prompted the abandonment of Cincinnati's five older train stations; four of the seven railroads already had rerouted their track to Union Terminal. An eighth railroad, the Erie Railroad, lost its access to Cincinnati after an agreement to share tracks with the Chesapeake & Ohio no longer applied. Erie passenger service was truncated to Dayton.

== Operation and decline ==
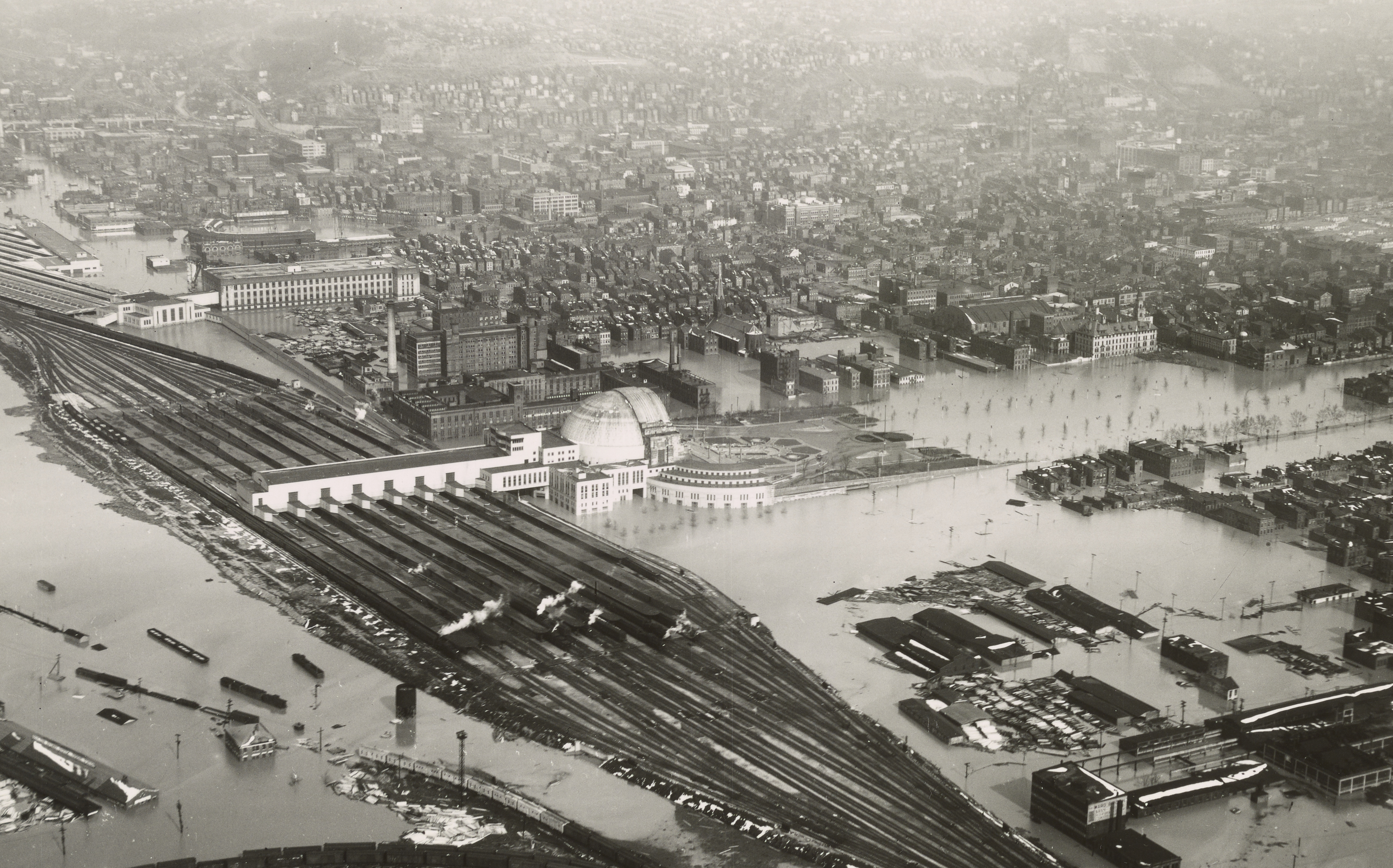
Union Terminal flooded during the Ohio River Flood of 1937

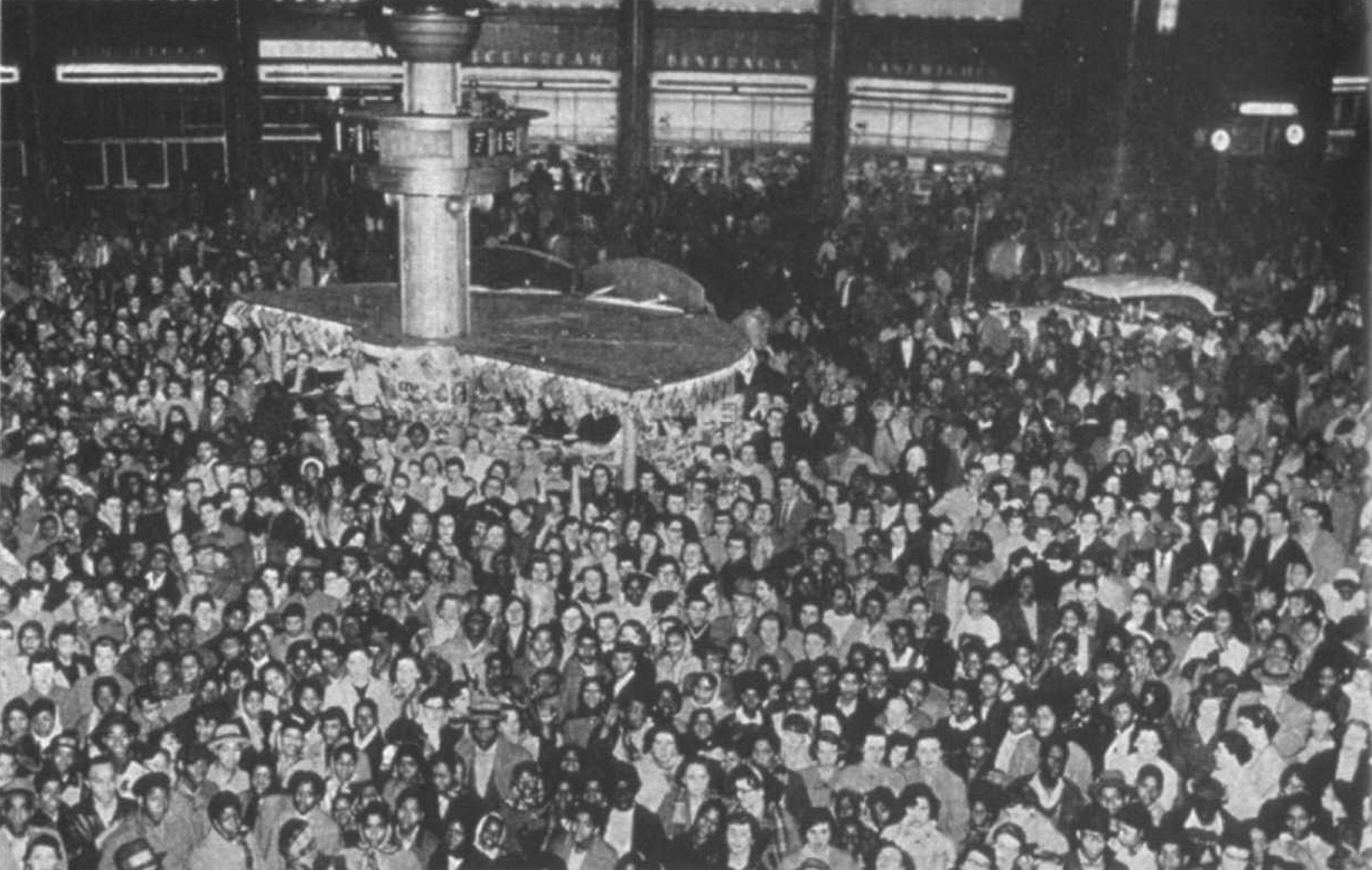
Christmastime crowd, 1945

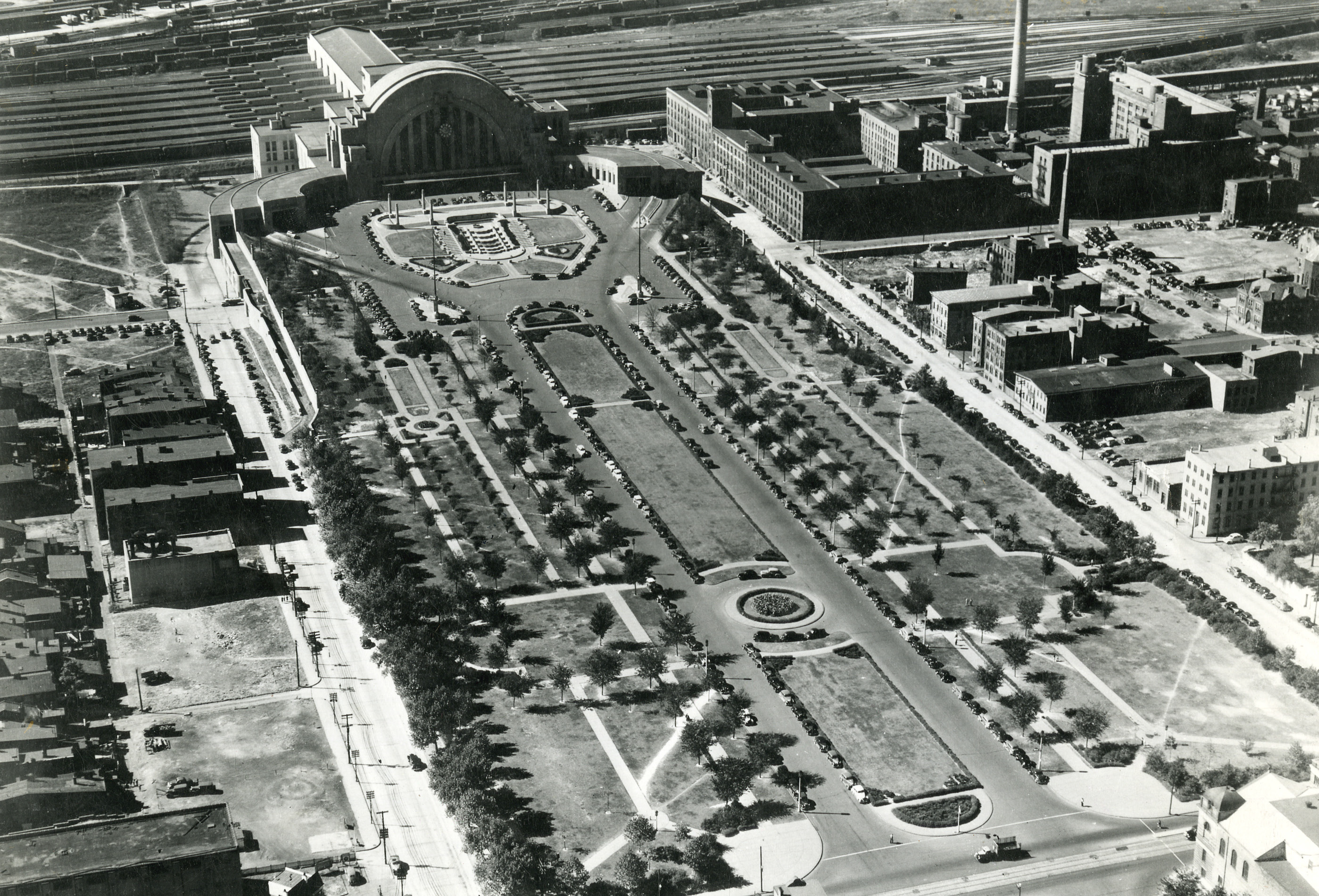
Union Terminal and its grounds in operation, 1947

Union Terminal opened during the Great Depression, a time of decline in train travel. Its early years therefore experienced relatively low passenger traffic.

In 1937, another Ohio River flood affected the city for about a month, and river gauge levels peaked at 80 feet (24 m), the highest level in the city's history. The terminal was built to withstand the flooding and was relatively undamaged. The lower levels of the building flooded, though passenger spaces, tracks, and platforms remained above the water level. The streets around it were flooded, including Hopkins and Kenner streets and Freeman Avenue. At the flood's peak, the Southern Railway was still operating out of the terminal, utilizing generators for lights and switches. Three railroads closed service to Cincinnati, though they still operated their suburban stations. The C&O, L&N, and the Norfolk & Western had to stop all trains.

By 1939, local newspapers were already describing the station as a white elephant. It had a brief revival in the 1940s, because of World War II. During the war, the terminal acted as a regional center for the United Service Organizations (USO), providing recreational services to troops. Trains carrying soldiers would regularly stop at Union Terminal, and around August 1941, the Rookwood tea parlor began use as one of three USO centers in the terminal; it was used for reading books and magazines and writing letters. The terminal was planned to handle 17,000 passengers, though a world war was not envisioned. During the height of the war, the number of people traveling through the terminal averaged 34,000 per day.

Passenger traffic declined through the 1950s into the 1960s, quickly shifting as air travel became more affordable and the Interstate Highway System was developing. Construction of Interstate 75 in the 1950s, directly in front of the Union Terminal grounds, cut off the terminal and its surroundings from downtown Cincinnati. Train service decreased from 51 per day in 1953 to 24 per day in 1962. Thus beginning in the late 1950s the Union Terminal Company searched for other uses for the building, including offering to lease space to the city for $1 per year. In June 1963, eight proposals for the space were made public: a railroad museum; transportation center for air, bus and rail lines; court building; convention center; Air Force museum; museum of science and industry; private industry; and a shopping center.

In 1968, the Cincinnati Science Center opened in Union Terminal. The museum installed its exhibits on the south side of the train concourse, allowing the north side to be used for rail passengers. Due to financial difficulties, the museum closed in 1970.

== Abandonment and partial demolition ==
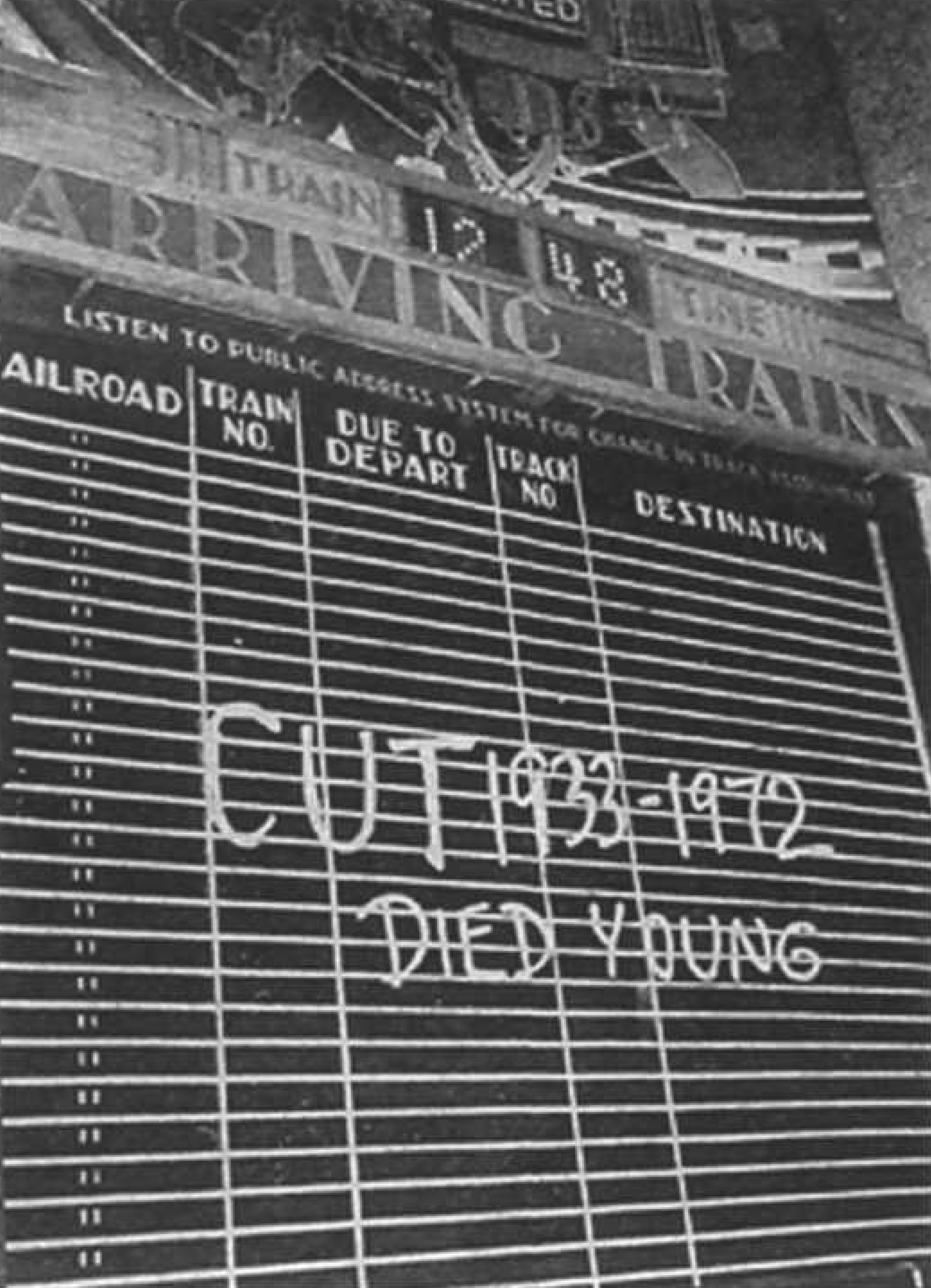
Arrivals chalkboard on October 28, 1972

Extensive restructuring took place in the railroad industry in the mid-to-late 20th century. Amtrak, the national rail service, was formed to acquire failing railroads as their ridership dropped. It took over most passenger service at Union Terminal in 1971, and cut back service to just two routes a day, both of which originated at the terminal–the Washington/Newport News-bound George Washington and the Chicago-bound James Whitcomb Riley. Those trains were subsequently integrated into a single long-distance Chicago-Washington/Newport News train, known as the George Washington eastbound and the James Whitcomb Riley westbound. However, due to the two trains having been inherited from separate railroads–the C&O and Penn Central, respectively–the merged train needed to perform a slow turn on a balloon loop north of Union Terminal in order to face the train in the correct direction, causing a half-hour delay.

The two total trains, with fewer than 30 boardings and detrainings per day, did not even begin to justify such a large station. As a result, Amtrak decided to close Union Terminal in October 1972, after just 18 months of service. It would be the first major station Amtrak abandoned in favor of a new station. The terminal's fate was uncertain after its scheduled closure, spurring multiple efforts to bring the topic to public attention in mid-to-late October. The Save and Revive Union Terminal Committee, department of art history at the University of Cincinnati (UC), and the Cincinnati Art Museum backed several projects. Northwestern professor Carl W. Condit lectured on the stations of Cincinnati at UC, and the train concourse's large industrial murals were illuminated for public viewing on October 22 to 29. An exhibit at the Contemporary Arts Center showed original photographs, drawings, and slides pertaining to the terminal's artworks, while an exhibit at UC's student center showed proposals for the terminal's future.

By October 11, the Ohio Historical Society submitted a nomination for the terminal to the National Register of Historic Places. The society noted the emergency as its owner planned to demolish the terminal at the time, and noted that the building did not meet the 50-year standard for acceptance to the register. Nonetheless, the terminal was added to the National Register 20 days later. With Amtrak planning to abandon the station, the Union Terminal Company would be left owning an empty building, having no income, and significant debt. On October 26, it sold the train concourse, platforms, and rail yard to Southern Railway, which was expanding its freight operations. The railroad turned the passenger yard into a freight yard, and planned on removing the 450-foot (140 m) long passenger train concourse to allow for unimpeded use of double-height and piggyback train cars. The railway announced its plans and allowed interested parties time to remove the concourse's murals. On the same day as the sale, mayor Tom Luken announced a 23-person task force to preserve the terminal.

The last passenger train to depart the terminal was an eastbound George Washington, which left for Washington/Newport News on October 28. Amtrak opened a smaller station at River Road, less than a mile from Union Terminal, on the following day. Of the replacement, it was said "you can put the new station in the men's room of the old station" (the current Amtrak waiting room). The terminal was seen as far too costly for Amtrak. Besides the limited service and patronage, it had enormous heating and maintenance costs, taxes, and $10 million in debentures due in 1974. The daily operating cost of River Road station was $500 to $1,000, while the terminal's daily cost was $2,000 to $3,000. The terminal was kept open to the public to attend showings at the Terminal Theater, which still held film classics during the period of closure.

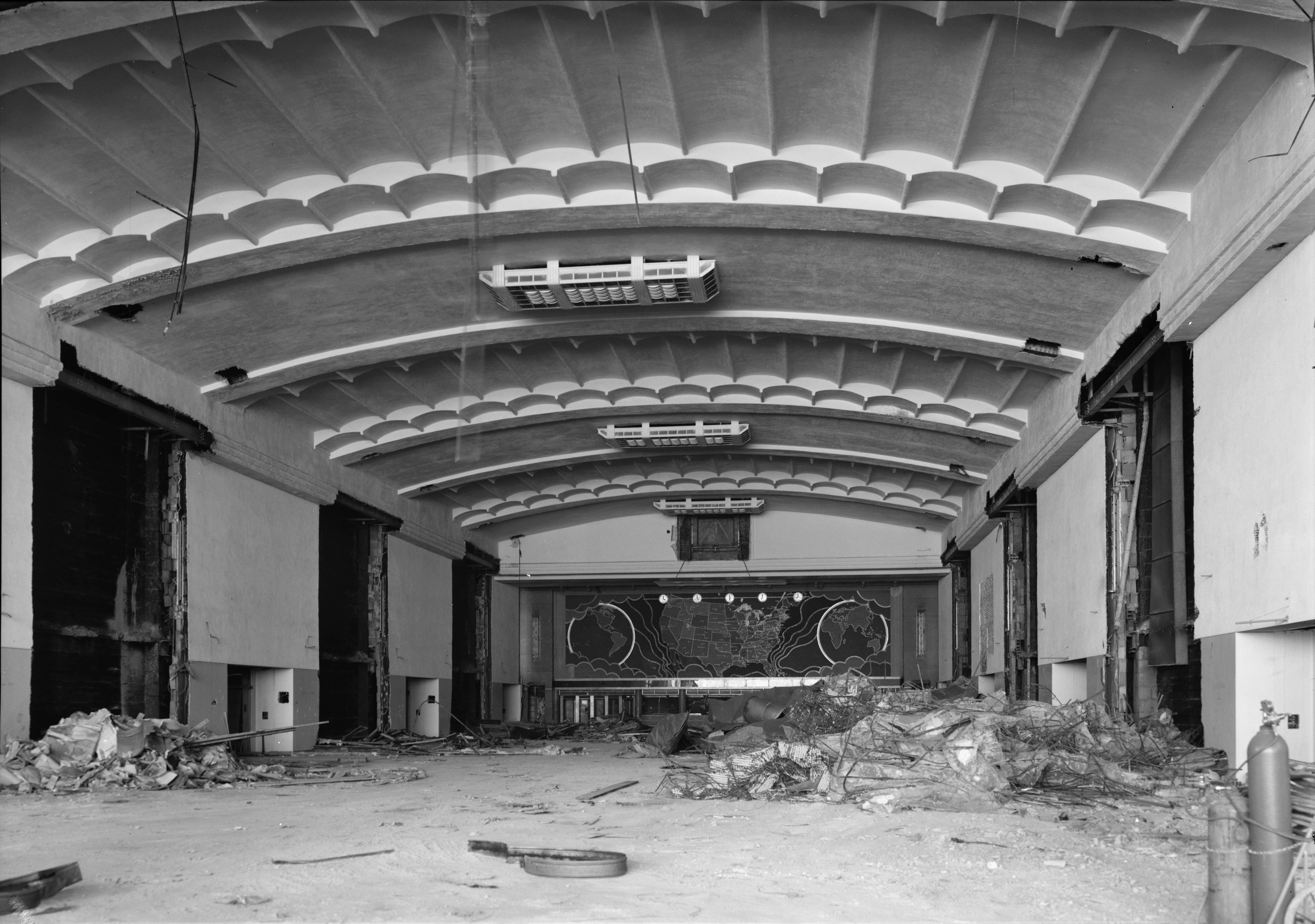
The train concourse during demolition

Art historian Gabriel P. Weisberg largely attributes the work of University of Cincinnati graduate students in saving the terminal. Student reports, theses, newspaper editorials, and gallery exhibitions proved the significance of the terminal, at a time where many Cincinnati residents still viewed the building as a white elephant. In January 1973, the Revive Union Terminal Committee picketed a Southern Railway board member's house, the city commissioner refused to issue a wrecking permit for the terminal, and further public events were planned. At this time, the Contemporary Arts Center, Tangeman Art Gallery, and UC's Administration Building all were exhibiting art, architecture, artifacts, and works inspired by Union Terminal. An open house reopened the terminal for free public viewing on January 17. On May 15, 1973, the Cincinnati City Council's Urban Development and Planning Committee voted 3–1 in favor of designating Union Terminal for preservation as a local historic landmark, preventing Southern Railway from destroying the entire building. By September 1974, the Southern Railway tore down most of the train concourse. Before this, the city removed the fourteen Reiss mosaic murals depicting important Cincinnati industries; Besl Transfer Company transported and installed them at the Cincinnati/Northern Kentucky International Airport. A grassroots campaign named "Save the Terminal" raised the $400,000 needed to save the works, though it could not raise sufficient funds to save the map mural at the west wall of the concourse, which was destroyed.

== Further plans and mall development ==
Loehmann's Department Store in the terminal's Rotunda

Several plans were floated for reuse of the building in the 1970s, including a plan to locate a Southwest Ohio Regional Transit Authority transit hub and the School for Creative and Performing Arts in the building, but these did not materialize.

In August 1975, the City of Cincinnati purchased the remaining terminal building and its 15-acre property from the Union Terminal Company for $1 million. Seeking tenants, they heard plans from three developers. The city government chose the Joseph Skilken Organization, a Columbus-based real estate developer. The company was run by Steve Skilken, its 27-year-old president. The Skilken Organization initially proposed "Oz" or the "Land of Oz", a shopping mall with an ice skating rink and bowling alley. The ice skating and bowling never materialized, but the shopping center's retail and restaurants began installation in 1978. The city offered a 30-year lease, at $1 per year. Skilken invested about $20 million in renovating the terminal, including repairing the fountains and clock, replacing windows, repainting the rotunda ceiling, professionally cleaning the interior murals, installing air conditioning, renovating the automobile ramps for pedestrian use, and resurfacing and adding additional parking lots, replacing park space.

In 1977, the terminal was designated a U.S. National Historic Landmark.

On August 4, 1980, the mall had its opening celebration, with 40 tenants. At its peak, the mall had 7,800 to 8,000 visitors per day and 54 vendors. The recession of the early 1980s negatively affected the mall; interest rates quickly grew from 6 to 22 percent. In 1981, the first tenant moved out and by 1982 the number of tenants had fallen to 21. In August of that year, the Cincinnati Museum of Health, Science and Industry opened in the terminal. Oz closed in 1984, however, Loehmann's Department Store, located in the center of the rotunda, remained open until 1985. For several years, a weekend flea market was held on the taxi and bus ramps that ran under the rotunda.

== Museum operation and rail service ==
Beginning in the early 1980s, the Cincinnati Historical Society and Cincinnati Museum of Natural History were searching for larger spaces. Both had their origins in the early-mid 1800s, and the historical society was interested in creating a museum. The most favorable options in their studies were to join in occupying space in Union Terminal. In May 1986, the voters of the surrounding county approved $33 million in funding to transform the building into museum space. The state of Ohio provided $8 million, the city provided $3 million, while about 3,000 individuals, corporations, and foundations also donated to the effort. Talk show host and then-Cincinnati mayor Jerry Springer was one of the major proponents of saving the building and transforming it into a museum. The terminal's 200,000 square feet of underground space, then used as parking space, as well as its taxi and bus ramps, were renovated into exhibition space. The main concourse was restored, retail space was refurbished, and the theater was restored. The entrance to the train concourse was renovated into the Omnimax theater, and the men's lounge became Amtrak's waiting room and ticket counter.

In 1986, the Union Terminal Association (UTA) was created to facilitate long-term preservation of the terminal. The organization included community members and city and county officials. The UTA leased the building from the city and searched for tenants. The UTA joined the Historical Society and Museum of Natural History in creating the Heritage Center at Union Terminal.

The museum opened on November 10, 1990, though it had its "grand opening day" on November 2, 1991, with the two museum's first permanent exhibits there. The original members of the museum center were the Cincinnati Historical Society Library, Cincinnati History Museum, Cincinnati Museum of Natural History, and the Robert D. Lindner Family Omnimax Theater. The museum center opened with the largest display of robotic dinosaurs, the largest World War II commemorative exhibit, and one of fourteen Omnimax theaters in the United States. Museum center officials were unsure if people would travel to the new museums as predicted, though the center became the fourth-largest attraction in the area, behind the Cincinnati Reds, Kings Island, and the Cincinnati Zoo.

The museum center renovations also allowed Amtrak to restore service to Union Terminal via the tri-weekly Cardinal train–successor of the Riley and George Washington. Train service first returned to Union Terminal on July 29, 1991, with a Chicago-bound train. The renovations included the installation of the Grand E.M. Skinner Concert Organ. In 1995, the entities officially merged to create the Cincinnati Museum Center, also joined by the Cinergy Children's Museum in October 1998.

In 2004, the county again approved an operating levy for the building's operating costs and capital repairs. The Cincinnati Museum Center developed a master plan for restoring the terminal in 2007. This included a pilot project, Project 1, which focused on the southwest wing of the building. The project included replacing exterior walls and windows, repairing the structure, a new HVAC system, and conserving and restoring interior designs, including four dining rooms. The southwest wing's roof was also replaced with a green roof. The project demonstrated the use of sustainable technologies in restoration of historic buildings, while abiding by its alteration restrictions as a National Historic Landmark. It revealed difficulties in assessing whether sustainable conservation methods were allowable, and prompted the museum center to explore renewable energy for the entire site, without impacting architectural, cultural, or historical elements.

In 2009, county residents approved an extension of the 2004 levy for further repairs. The museum center hosted a workshop in 2011 to discuss and debate renovation issues, attended by people in sustainability, architecture, design, preservation, and other academic fields.

In June 2014, the National Trust for Historic Preservation named Union Terminal as one of the 11 most endangered historic places in the country due to deterioration.

== Renovation and reopening ==
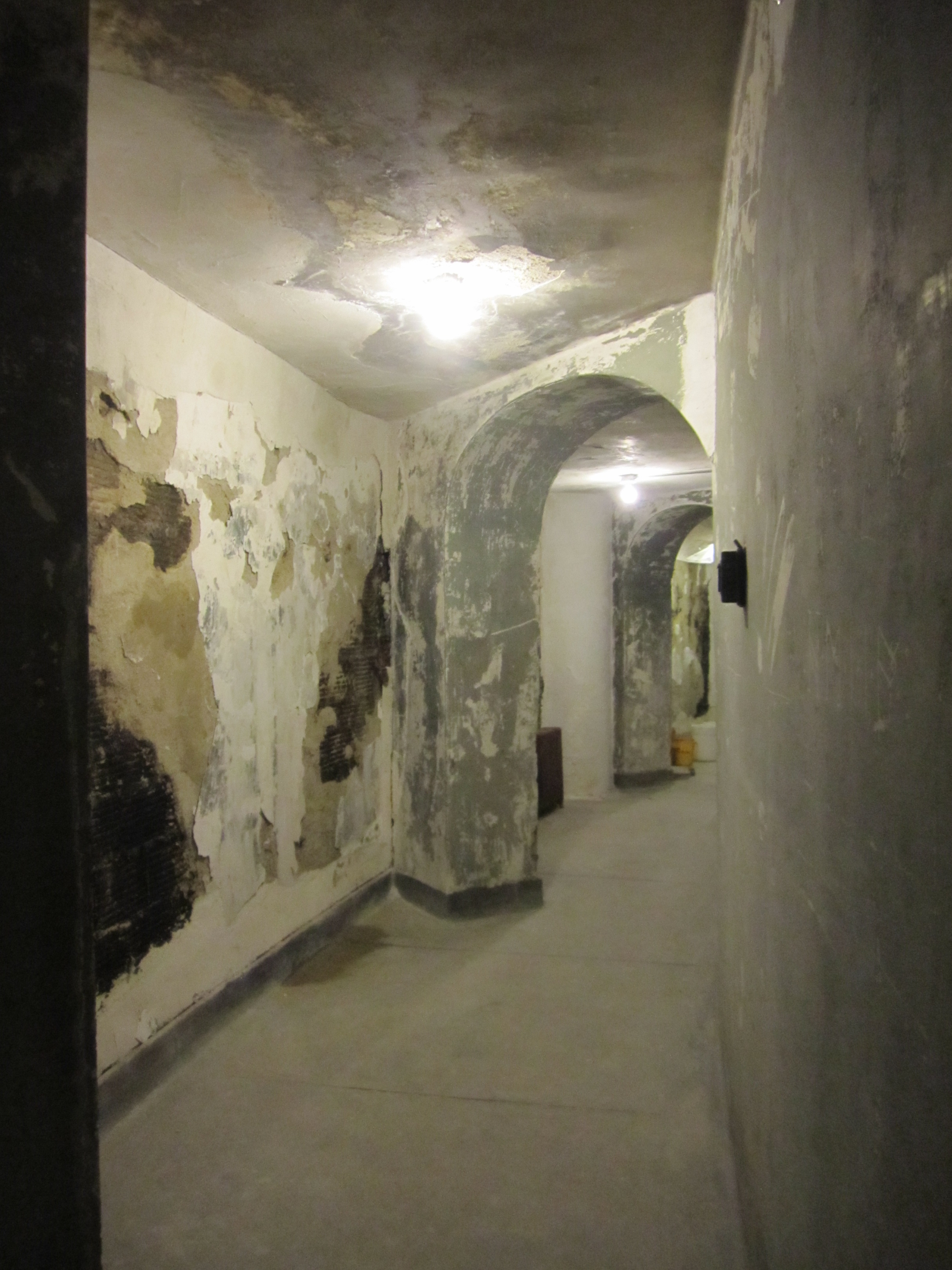
Deteriorating service hallways prior to the renovation

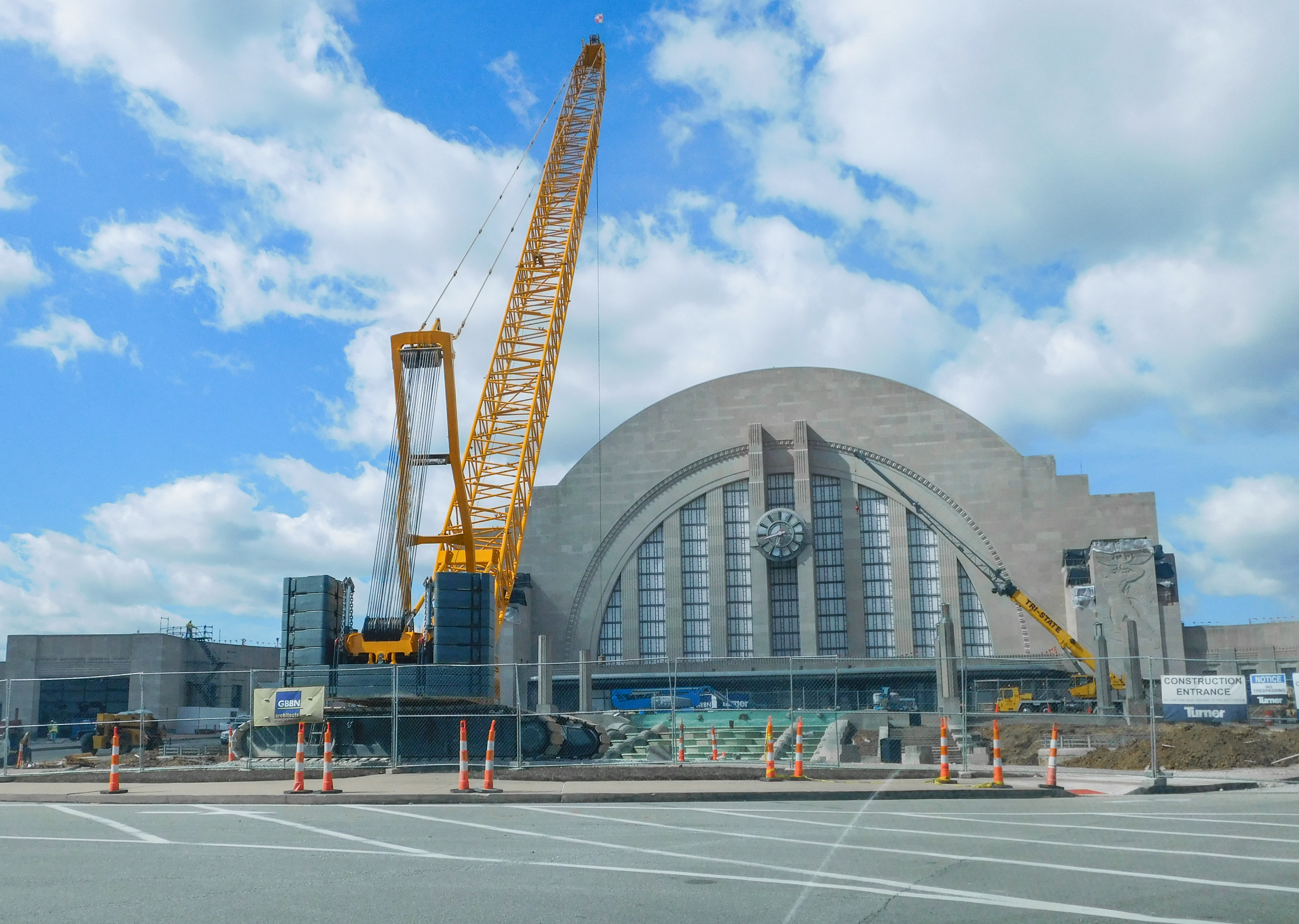
Terminal renovation, 2017

From July 2016 until November 2018, the museum was shut down in order to complete a $228 million renovation throughout the entire building, in addition to restoring numerous rooms original to the building. The renovation was approved by Hamilton County voters through an increased sales tax, bringing $176 million, and was also funded by $5 million in state grants, $7.5 million in donations, and $39 million in federal historic tax credits. It was the first full renovation of the building, after two smaller renovations that made the Land of Oz shopping center and the Cincinnati Museum Center operable.

Due to the building's flat roofs, water damage caused the walls and roofs to rot. Original plans called for leaving the Duke Energy Children's Museum and the Cincinnati History Museum open, but it was decided to shutter the entire building after water damage proved to be more extensive than previously thought. During the closure, items located in the museum were stored in the Geier Center, the museum's research and storage facility, and in various traveling exhibits across the country. Amtrak services moved to a temporary annex on Kenner Street, just north of Union Terminal.

The renovation included cleaning and repairing the building. The clock face, hands, and mechanism were removed and repaired, and the mosaic murals and canvas paintings were cleaned. One of the most significant projects was the replacement of the building's westernmost wall, built after the concourse was demolished. The wall was not braced properly, was not built to expand or contract with weather conditions, and was failing. The wall, 20 feet above ground, and 40 feet tall and 100 feet wide, was difficult to replace, especially with the active freight line 15 feet behind it. Workers also dismantled the entire fountain and front plaza. The children's museum and mezzanine lie directly beneath the fountain, and the roof had experienced leaking. The waterproofing was as old as the terminal, and thus was replaced. The fountain was reinstalled with the same specifications, and a new concrete and terrazzo basin, and repolished brass fixtures. The plaza concrete was replaced, adding colored stripes as was original to the design.

In July 2018, Amtrak de-staffed 15 of its stations, including Cincinnati. Two Union Terminal ticket agents were replaced by a part-time contracted caretaker, and Amtrak eliminated the ability to check baggage, purchase tickets in-person, and for unaccompanied minors to board or disembark in Cincinnati. Since the completion of the renovation project, the station remains without dedicated staff, and all tickets to and from Cincinnati must be purchased in advance; there are no Quik-Trak ticket kiosks. Baggage service is self-serve; passengers can check bags trainside after obtaining baggage checking supplies in the station and attaching them to their baggage. In May 2020, following a new law passed by Congress, Amtrak began the hiring process for new CUT station agents, along with those for other stations cut in 2018.

The building and museum center had their reopening ceremony on November 17, 2018. The terminal expanded its foodservice contract from 2014 for operation of three dining rooms on the main concourse, two on the lower level, a retail shop, and other rotating operations. The main level operation Cup and Pint now serves pizzas, coffee, and draft beer, while Nourish 513 serves sandwiches, salads, and fast food. The Rookwood Tea Room reopened as a Graeter's location. In January 2019, the terminal gained another museum as a tenant, the Nancy & David Wolf Holocaust and Humanity Center, in the former space of the History Library.
