= Henry Matson Waite =

Henry Matson Waite may refer to:

- Henry Matson Waite (judge)
- Henry Matson Waite (engineer)
