= The Weight (disambiguation) =

"The Weight" is a 1968 song by the Band.

The Weight may also refer to:

- The Weight (2012 film), a South Korean film
- The Weight (2026 film), an American/German historical drama film
- "The Weight" (The Sopranos), an episode of the TV series The Sopranos

== See also ==
- Weight (disambiguation)
