= Justice Waite (disambiguation) =

Justice Waite may refer to:

- Morrison Waite (1816–1888), chief justice of the United States Supreme Court
- Aaron E. Waite (1813–1898), chief justice of the Oregon Supreme Court
- Charles Burlingame Waite (1824–1909), justice of the Utah Supreme Court
- Henry Matson Waite (judge) (1787–1869), chief justice of the Connecticut Supreme Court

== See also ==
- William C. Wait (1860–1935), justice of the Massachusetts Supreme Judicial Court
