= Lincoln Park (Cincinnati) =

Public park in Cincinnati, Ohio

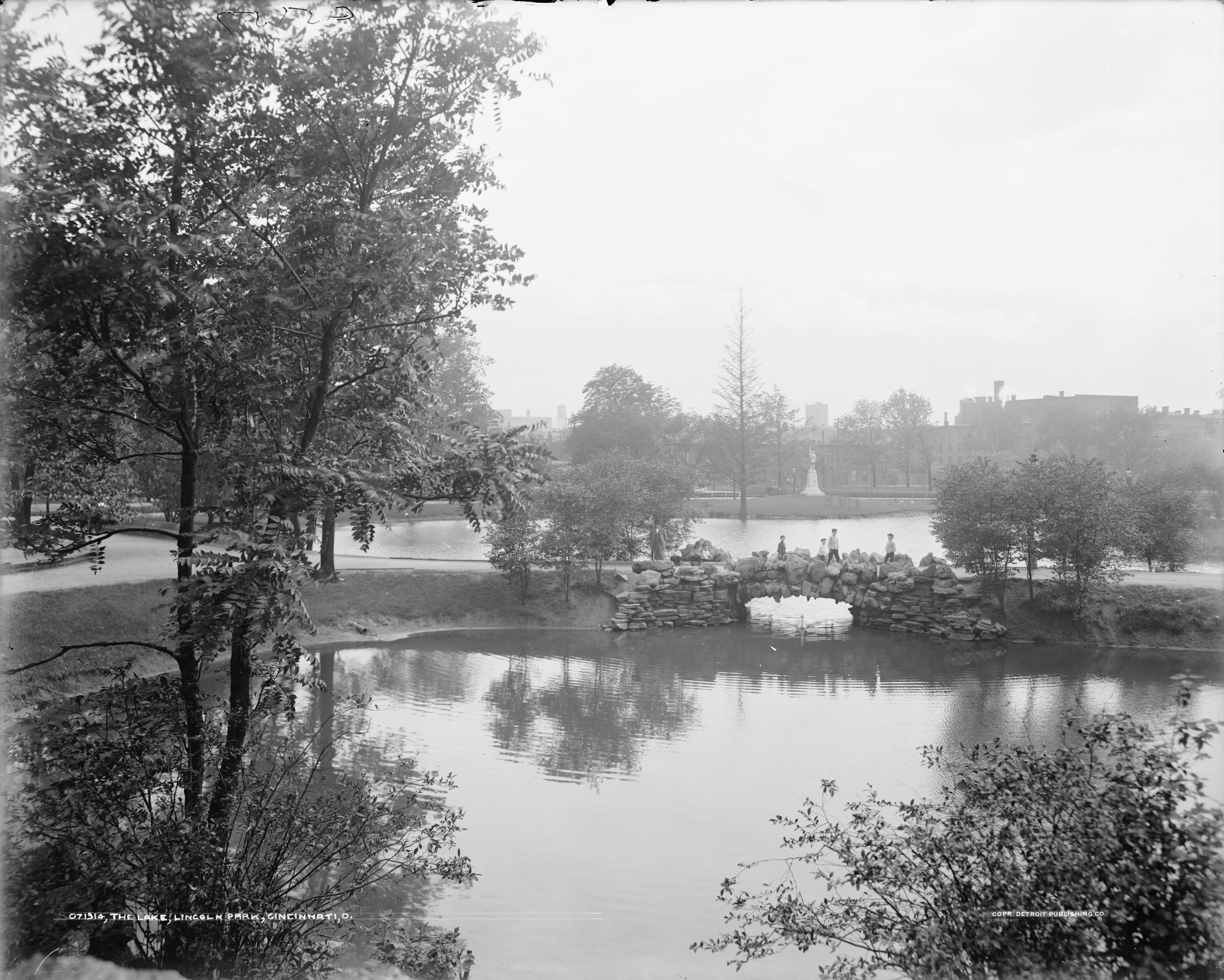
- Lincoln Park lake and statue, c. 1900-1910
- Interactive map of Lincoln Park
- Type: City park
- Location: Cincinnati, Ohio, U.S.
- Coordinates: 39.109741°N 84.534210°W
- Area: 10–18 acres (4.0–7.3 ha)
- Opened: 1858
- Closed: 1929
- Designer: Adolph Strauch
- Operator: Cincinnati Park Board
- Vegetation: 2,350 trees and shrubs 913 herbs

Lincoln Park was a public park in the West End of Cincinnati, Ohio, now part of the grounds of Cincinnati Union Terminal. The park included a lake, island, gazebo, a public green with brick walkways, and a baseball field. The gazebo was often used by musicians, and the lake was used in wintertime for ice skating.

The park was one of the first in Cincinnati, created in 1858, and one of few no longer extant. It was relandscaped from 1929 to 1933 to become a decorative green space for Union Terminal's entrance drive. Most of the space was paved over in 1980 for the terminal's shopping mall, the Land of Oz, and is subsequently used by the Cincinnati Museum Center.

== Location ==
Lincoln Park was located in the current parking lot and entrance drive of Cincinnati Union Terminal, directly east of the structure. The area was originally part of Cincinnati's Ward 16, later the West End neighborhood, and it later became part of the Queensgate neighborhood. It had similar boundaries to Union Terminal's grounds - Kenner Street to the north, Hopkins Street to the south, Freeman Avenue to the east, and Hoefer Street to the west (now approximately where the rail yard lies behind the terminal).

== Attributes ==
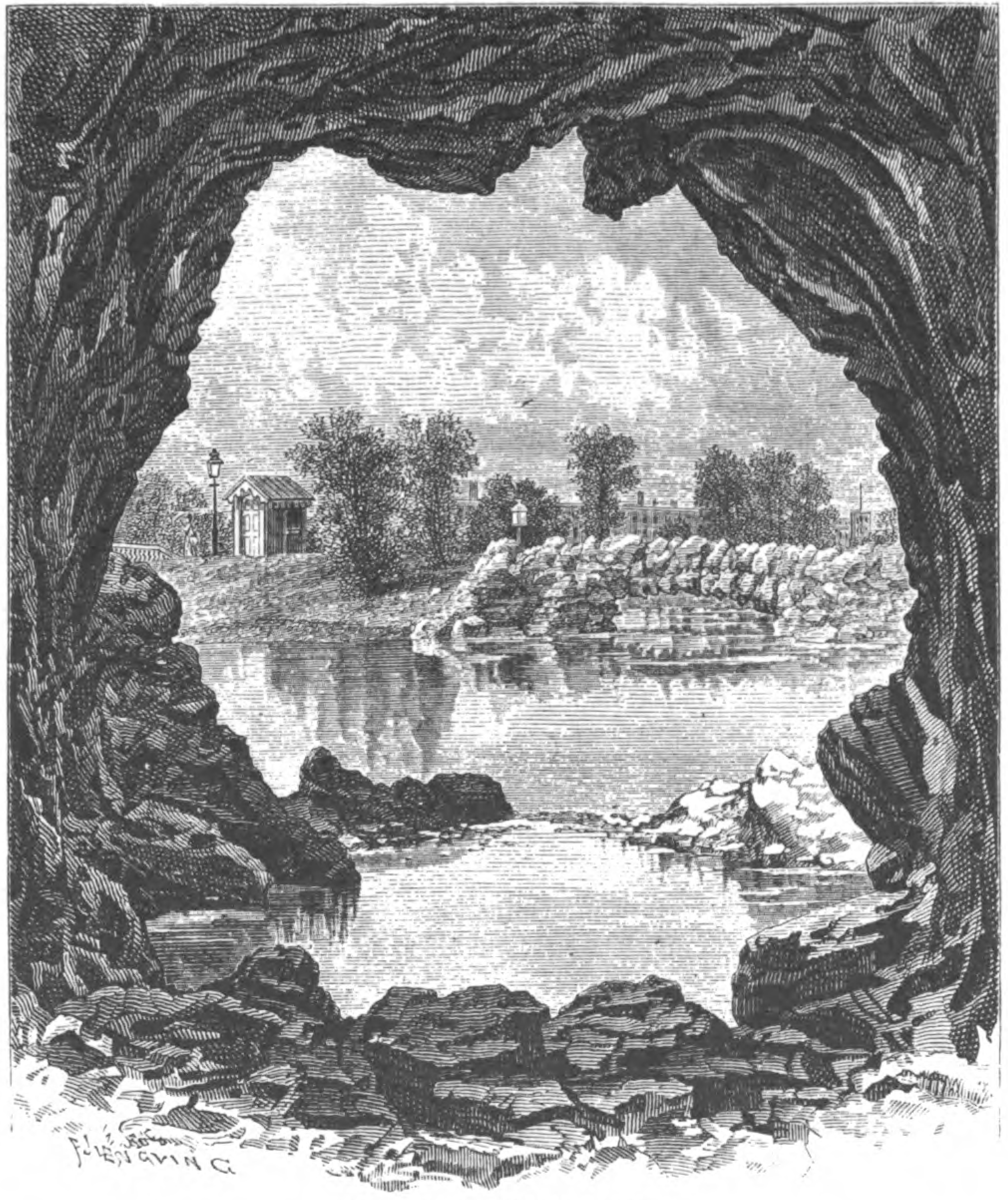
Lincoln Park's grotto

The park had 10–18 acres (4.0–7.3 ha) at different times in its history, and included a public green, a manmade lake for boating and fishing, a sunken garden and grotto, a playground and wading pool, a small island with a decorative gazebo, numerous park benches, brick walkways, and an exterior fence. Musicians would often perform in the gazebo, and Cincinnati residents would gather on the lake's banks to listen. The lake was stocked with swans and other rare birds. The park had a view of Kentucky hills across the Mill Creek. In the wintertime, the lake was often used for ice skating.

The park had several shelter houses, including a small building built in 1892. Beginning in 1914, the park had a large shelter house, a two-story brick building with a large social room, dressing rooms, men's and women's restrooms, a tool room, store room, and storage space.

== History ==
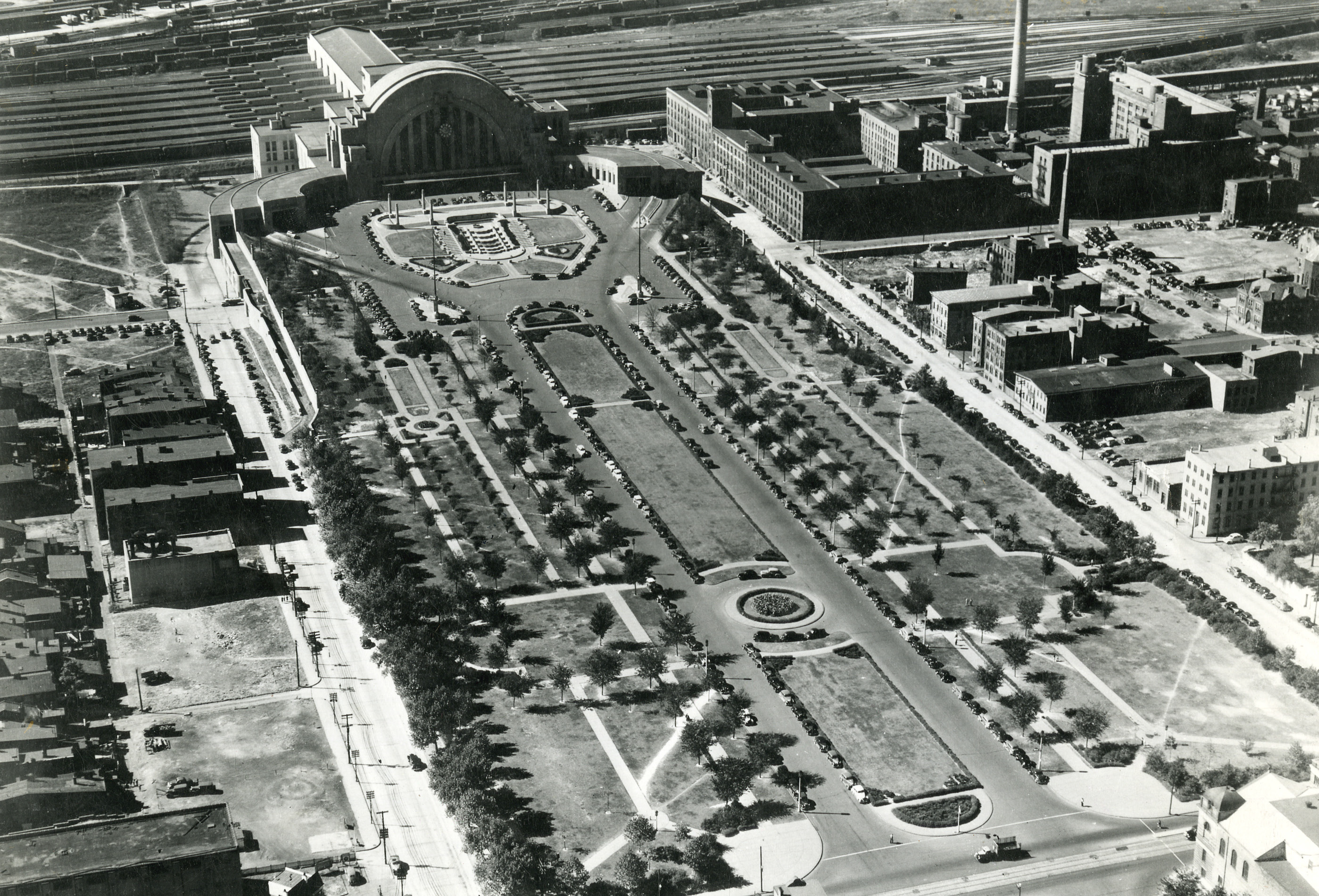
Lincoln Park relandscaped as part of Union Terminal's grounds, c. 1947

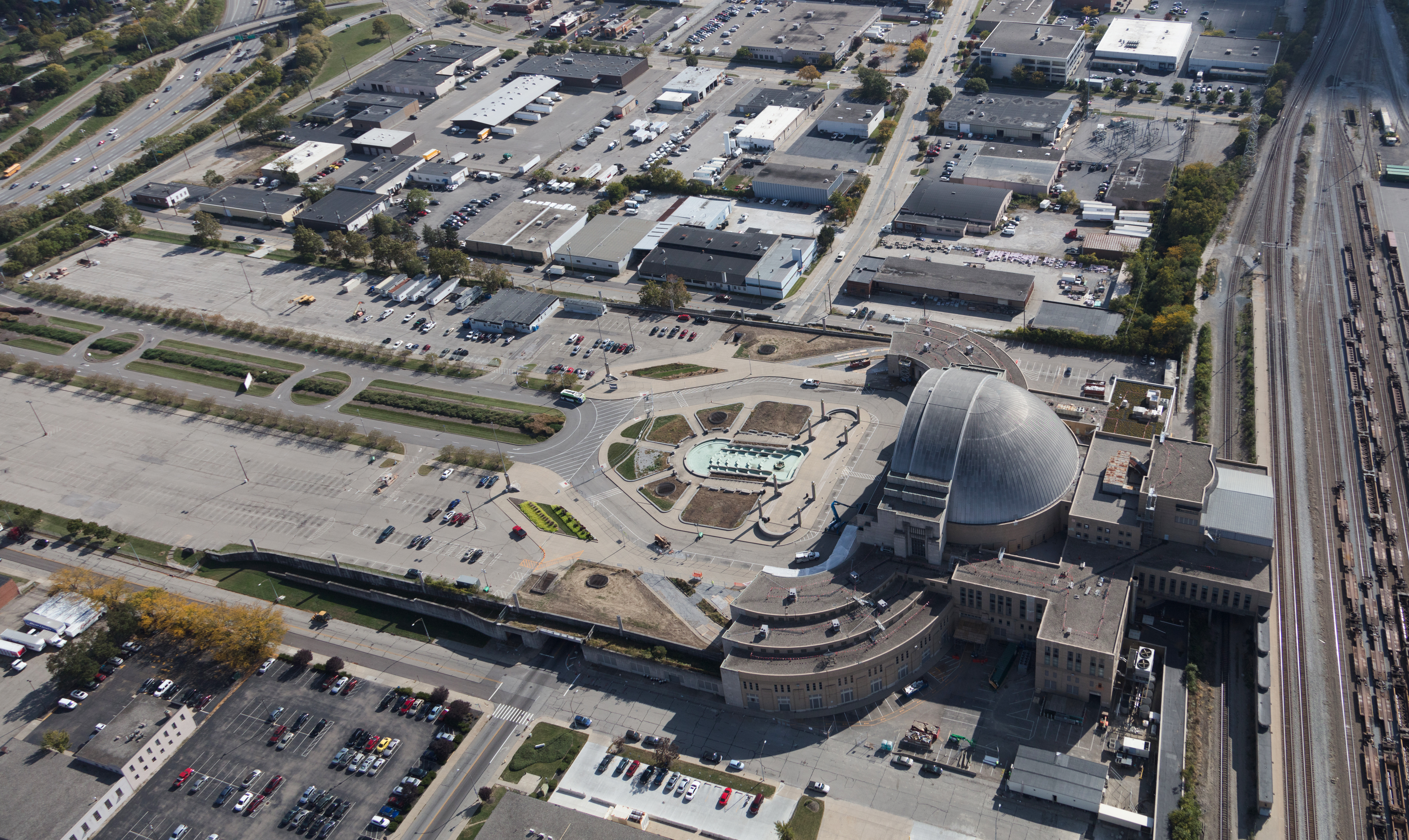
Remaining landscaping and converted parking space, 2016

Cincinnati Township first acquired the land in 1829, sold by J.D. Garrard and Sarah Bella Garrard for $2,000. The township exchanged the land to the city of Cincinnati for Out Lot No. 53 in two stages; the land is currently occupied by the Cincinnati Music Hall. The first exchange was for six acres in 1834, and its second was for four acres in 1837. The site had an asylum for orphans in its northwest corner. During the land exchange, the orphanage was relocated to the outlot, while the building itself began being used as a pest house. The land became known as Potter's Field, as it was made into a potter's field for about 20 years, a public burial ground for lower-income, abandoned, and unclaimed residents of Cincinnati. In 1857, upset property owner complaints resulted in the potter's field and pest house moving outside city limits and the space becoming a park.

The park, first known as West End Park, was first landscaped in June 1858, after the buried were relocated to a cemetery elsewhere, likely Price Hill Potter's Field. Around 1865, the park was renamed Lincoln Park, after the recently assassinated President Abraham Lincoln. Around 1872, citizens pushed for the addition of 27 acres to Lincoln Park, noting it as an "oasis in the desert of bricks", heavily used by residents in need of parks in walking distance from their homes. In 1873, Cincinnati parks landscape architect Adolph Strauch improved the park, adding its miniature lake, small waterfall, island, and grotto, introducing the park's rare birds, and planting gardens and new trees. These picturesque elements were more common in eighteenth-century English gardens.

In 1892, Cincinnati's Board of Park Commissioners constructed a shelter house, which included a "refreshment room" and an office and workshop for the park's foreman. In 1893, the average weekly park attendance was 30,000 people from May to September, with 10,000 per week in the remaining months. In 1914, a new shelter house was constructed, a two-story brick building with a large social room, dressing rooms, men's and women's restrooms, a tool room, store room, and storage space.

When the terminal's plans were developed, the park was among yard tracks, a public dump, houses, grain silos, an ice warehouse, all of which had to be moved or demolished to make way for the terminal complex. The terminal company planned for the park to become the terminal's lush entrance drive, originally a sunken garden with its existing lake and island. The terminal company also agreed to create Laurel Park in turn for its acquisition of Lincoln Park.

Lincoln Park was instead remodeled in 1932 from its lush foliage, lake, and gazebo to simply have grass lawns and pleasant landscaping. The relandscaping included elms and sycamore tree borders, with flower beds in the central strip. When relandscaped, the terminal lawn, still sometimes known as Lincoln Park, measured 1,400 by 500 feet (430 m × 150 m), and gently carried broad driveways upward to the terminal. The central strip is still intact, however the portions to its north and south became parking lots in 1980, as part of renovations to open the terminal's shopping mall, the Land of Oz. The parking lots are currently maintained and used by the Cincinnati Museum Center, the terminal's largest tenant.

After the terminal was constructed, in 1935, the road leading between it and Cincinnati Music Hall was named Lincoln Park Drive after the park. In 1976, the road was renamed to its current name, Ezzard Charles Drive, after Cincinnati resident Ezzard Charles.

=== Statues ===
The park had a statue of Captain John J. Desmond, on the south side of the lake, unveiled May 6, 1899.

Desmond was a lawyer and militia captain killed during the Cincinnati riots of 1884. His statue was originally placed in the park, though it was moved when Lincoln Park was relandscaped to become part of the new Union Terminal. It was relocated to Washington Park, though it eventually was moved to the lobby of the Hamilton County Courthouse, the successor to the building Desmond died defending. The statue is massive, and depicts Desmond holding an American flag.

==== Lincoln monument ====
In 1866, Thomas White of T. White & Son Marble Works designed a marble statue of Lincoln to be placed in the park. Although stated to cost $10,000, he offered it for free, though if allowed to call upon Cincinnati residents to contribute in reimbursing him for his effort. The monument was originally intended as a 25-foot-tall elaborately ornamented temple, with Greek and Gothic influences, decorated columns supporting a roof, with the bust of Lincoln placed in the center of the structure. Adolph Strauch selected a site by the lake, allowing for a reflection. The monument and bust were to be of white Italian marble, with a base of Quincy granite. Two marble lions were at its base, and a sculptured bird was placed on top. A dispute arose over whether the monument was a donation, and thus the marble company removed the monument during the night, in 1872. The Lincoln bust later shattered.

=== Baseball park ===
The Lincoln Park Grounds or Union Grounds was an adjacent baseball field, removed for installation of Union Terminal's headhouse and plaza. The baseball park was built for the Union Cricket Club, and was used by the Cincinnati Base Ball Club for a few seasons in 1860.
