= The Mormon Prophet and His Harem =

1866 book by C. V. Waite

The Mormon Prophet and His Harem; or, an Authentic History of Brigham Young, His Numerous Wives and Children.
- Author: C. V. Waite
- Language: English
- Subject: Brigham Young
- Publisher: Riverside Press
- Publication date: 1866
- Publication place: United States
- Media type: Print (Hardcover)
- Pages: 280

The Mormon Prophet and His Harem; or, an Authentic History of Brigham Young, His Numerous Wives and Children. is a biography of Brigham Young by C. V. Waite, first published in 1866.

== Impact ==
Mark Twain's Roughing It references Waite's The Mormon Prophet in relation to the book's account of the Mountain Meadows massacre and the accusation that Brigham Young ordered it.

== Editions ==
- The Mormon Prophet and His Harem; or, an Authentic History of Brigham Young, His Numerous Wives and Children. Cambridge, Massachusetts: Riverside Press. 1866.
- The Mormon Prophet and His Harem; or, an Authentic History of Brigham Young, His Numerous Wives and Children (5th revised and enlarged ed.). Chicago: J.S. Goodman & Co. 1868.
