= Weight (disambiguation) =

Weight is a measurement of the gravitational force acting on an object.

Weight or The Weight may also refer to:

== Mathematics ==
- Weight (graph theory) a number associated to an edge or to a vertex of a graph
- Weight (representation theory), a type of function
- Weight (strings), the number of times a letter occurs in a string
- Weight, an integer associated to each variable of a quasi-homogeneous polynomial
- Weight of a topological space; see base
- Weighting, making some data contribute to a result more than others
  - Weight function
  - Weighted mean and weighted average, the importance can vary on each piece of data
  - Weighting filter

== Science and technology ==
- Weight (unit), a former English unit
- Weight, a connection strength, or coefficient in a linear combination, as in an artificial neural network
- Weight, a measure of paper density
- Body weight, a commonly used term for the mass of an organism's body
- Font weight
- Line weight in contour line construction in cartography
- Specific weight, the weight per unit volume of a material
- In underwater diving, a dense object used for ballast in a diving weighting system
- Balance weights, part of a weighing scale
- Weight (object), object whose chief task is to exert weight

== Film and television ==
- The Weight (2012 film), a South Korean film
- The Weight (2026 film), an upcoming American/German historical drama film
- "Weight" (Justified), a 2014 television episode
- "The Weight" (The Sopranos), a 2002 television episode

== Music ==
- Weight (album), by Rollins Band, 1994
- Weight (EP), by the Kindred, 2017
- "Weight" (song), by Latrice Royale, 2014
- "The Weight", a song by The Band, 1968
- "Weight", a song by Alexz Johnson, 2020
- "Weight", a song by Brockhampton from Iridescence, 2018
- "Weight", a song by Isis from Oceanic, 2002

== Sports ==
- Weight, an object of known mass used in weight training
- Weight, the object thrown in a weight throw
- Draw weight of a bow
- Weight class, a competition division used to match competitors against others of their own size

== Other uses ==
- Weight (surname)
- Weight (wine) or "body", a quality of wine
