= Weight (surname) =

Weight is a surname. Notable people with the surname include:

- Carel Weight (1908–1997), British artist
- Doug Weight (born 1971), American ice hockey player and coach
- Greg Weight (born 1946), Australian photographer

== See also ==
- Waight
- Waite (name)
- Weight (disambiguation)
