= Waight =

Waight is a surname. Notable people with this surname include:

- Clare Waight Keller (born 1970, née Waight), British stylist and fashion designer
- Dennis Waight (1895–1984), British soldier
- John Waight (born 1945), Belizean sports shooter

== See also ==
- Waite (name)
- Weight (surname)
