= Waite =

Waite may refer to:

== People and fictional characters ==
- Waite (name), a list of people and fictional characters with the surname or given name
- An alternative spelling for Wait (musician)

== Other uses ==
- Waite, Maine, a town in the United States
- Waite Research Precinct, located in the Adelaide suburb of Urrbrae, South Australia
  - Waite Campus of the University of Adelaide, located within the Waite Research Precinct
- Electoral district of Waite, a state electoral district in South Australia

== See also ==
- Wait (disambiguation)
