= Thornhope, Indiana =

- Unincorporated community
- Location within Indiana Location within the United States
- Coordinates: 40°55′33″N 86°31′46″W
- Country: United States
- State: Indiana
- County: Pulaski
- Township: Van Buren
- Elevation: 725 ft (221 m)
- Time zone: UTC-5 (Eastern (EST))
  - Summer (DST): UTC-4 (EDT)
- ZIP code: 46985
- GNIS feature ID: 452943

Thornhope is an unincorporated community in Van Buren Township, Pulaski County, in the U.S. state of Indiana.

== History ==
Thornhope was originally known as Parisville, and under the latter name was laid out in 1853 when the railroad was extended to that point.

Another variant name of the community was called Oak. A post office ran with this name from 1856 to 1966.
