= Senator Waite =

Senator Waite may refer to:

- Henry Matson Waite (judge) (1787–1869), Connecticut State Senate
- Morrison Waite (1816–1888), Ohio State Senate

== See also ==
- John T. Wait (1811–1899), Connecticut State Senate
