= Henry Randall Waite =

US editor and clergyman

Henry Randall Waite (Copenhagen, New York, 16 December 1845 – East Orange, New Jersey, 8 May 1909) was a United States editor and clergyman.

== Biography ==
He graduated from Hamilton College in 1868, and then was engaged in journalism until 1870. He then studied theology in the Union Theological Seminary, New York, where he edited the University Quarterly Review. He was pastor of the American church in Rome 1871–74, on the staff of the New Haven Journal 1875, editor of the International Review 1876–77, and until 1880 pastor of a Presbyterian church in Pelham, New York. In 1891 he became acting pastor of a Congregational church in Brooklyn.

Waite organized the National Reform League in 1876. He was president of the Political Science Association of New York 1876–77, special officer of the United States census 1880-83, editor of the Boston Citizen 1885–86, then editor of Civics in New York City. In 1885 he founded the American Institute of Civics, of which he was president. He was the first to employ the term “civics” to designate those branches of science that pertain to the elevation of citizenship.

He published The Motive of St. Paul's Life and Illiteracy and the Mormon Problem.
