= Governor Waite =

Governor Waite may refer to:

- Davis Hanson Waite (1825–1901), 8th Governor of Colorado
- Nicholas Waite (died c. 1715), Governor of Bombay from 1704 to 1708
