= John Waite (disambiguation) =

John Waite may refer to:

- John Waite (born 1952), English singer
- John Waite (cricketer) (1930–2011), South African cricketer
- John Waite (broadcaster) (born 1951), presenter on British radio and television
- John Waite (footballer) (1942–2016), English footballer
- Sir John Douglas Waite, Lord Justice of Appeal

== See also ==
- John Whaite (born 1989), English baker
- John T. Wait (1811–1899), American politician
