= Weight (strings) =

The $a$-weight of a string, for a letter $a$, is the number of times that letter occurs in the string. More precisely, let $A$ be a finite set (called the alphabet), $a\in A$ a letter of $A$, and $c\in A^*$ a string (where $A^*$ is the free monoid generated by the elements of $A$, equivalently the set of strings, including the empty string, whose letters are from $A$). Then the $a$-weight of $c$, denoted by $\mathrm{wt}_a(c)$, is the number of times the generator $a$ occurs in the unique expression for $c$ as a product (concatenation) of letters in $A$.

If $A$ is an abelian group, the Hamming weight $\mathrm{wt}(c)$ of $c$, often simply referred to as "weight", is the number of nonzero letters in $c$.

== Examples ==
- Let $A=\{x,y,z\}$. In the string $c=yxxzyyzxyzzyx$, $y$ occurs 5 times, so the $y$-weight of $c$ is $\mathrm{wt}_y(c)=5$.
- Let $A=\mathbf{Z}_3=\{0,1,2\}$ (an abelian group) and $c=002001200$. Then $\mathrm{wt}_0(c)=6$, $\mathrm{wt}_1(c)=1$, $\mathrm{wt}_2(c)=2$ and $\mathrm{wt}(c)=\mathrm{wt}_1(c)+\mathrm{wt}_2(c)=3$.
