= Star City, Indiana =

- Census-designated place
- Location of Star City in Pulaski County, Indiana.
- Coordinates: 40°58′21″N 86°33′15″W
- Country: United States
- State: Indiana
- County: Pulaski
- Township: Van Buren

Area
  - Total: 1.03 sq mi (2.68 km^{2})
  - Land: 1.03 sq mi (2.68 km^{2})
  - Water: 0 sq mi (0.00 km^{2})
- Elevation: 715 ft (218 m)

Population (2020)
  - Total: 281
  - Density: 271/sq mi (104.7/km^{2})
- Time zone: UTC-5 (Eastern (EST))
  - Summer (DST): UTC-4 (EDT)
- ZIP code: 46985
- Area code: 574
- FIPS code: 18-72638
- GNIS feature ID: 2393247

Star City is a census-designated place (CDP) in Van Buren Township, Pulaski County, in the U.S. state of Indiana. As of the 2020 census, Star City had a population of 281.

== History ==
Star City was originally called Scarboro, and under the latter name was laid out in 1859. The original name proved to be unpopular, and the name was changed to Star City in 1861 by a vote of the citizens.

A post office has been in operation at Star City since 1862.

== Geography ==
According to the United States Census Bureau, the CDP has a total area of 1.1 square miles (2.8 km^{2}), all land.

== Demographics ==
Historical population
Census	Pop.	Note	%±
2000	377		—
2020	281		—
U.S. Decennial Census

As of the census of 2000, there were 377 people, 133 households, and 106 families residing in the CDP. The population density was 357.1 inhabitants per square mile (137.9/km^{2}). There were 138 housing units at an average density of 130.7 per square mile (50.5/km^{2}). The racial makeup of the CDP was 99.20% White, 0.27% from other races, and 0.53% from two or more races. Hispanic or Latino of any race were 1.33% of the population.

There were 133 households, out of which 39.1% had children under the age of 18 living with them, 67.7% were married couples living together, 8.3% had a female householder with no husband present, and 20.3% were non-families. 17.3% of all households were made up of individuals, and 5.3% had someone living alone who was 65 years of age or older. The average household size was 2.83 and the average family size was 3.20.

In the CDP, the population was spread out, with 30.5% under the age of 18, 8.8% from 18 to 24, 24.9% from 25 to 44, 24.1% from 45 to 64, and 11.7% who were 65 years of age or older. The median age was 36 years. For every 100 females, there were 97.4 males. For every 100 females age 18 and over, there were 98.5 males.

The median income for a household in the CDP was $39,432, and the median income for a family was $40,089. Males had a median income of $24,028 versus $20,302 for females. The per capita income for the CDP was $14,168. None of the population or families were below the poverty line.
