= Pennsylvania Station (Cincinnati) =

Cincinnati
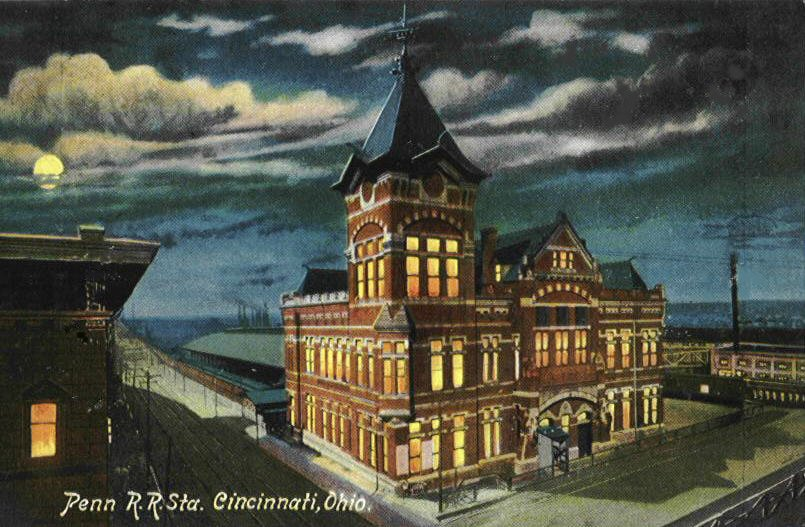
- Pennsylvania Depot

General information
- Location: U.S.
- Coordinates: 39°06′04.3″N 84°29′59.7″W
- Line: Pennsylvania Railroad

History
- Opened: 1880
- Closed: 1933

Former services
Preceding station	Pennsylvania Railroad	Following station
Torrence Road toward Chicago	Chicago – Cincinnati	Terminus
Terminus	Cincinnati – Columbus	Torrence Road toward Columbus
Preceding station	Louisville and Nashville Railroad	Following station
Newport toward New Orleans	Main Line	Terminus
Terminus	Cincinnati – Atlanta	Covington toward Atlanta
Location

Pennsylvania Station was a railroad station in Cincinnati, Ohio, that served the Pennsylvania Railroad (PRR), for which it was named, and the Louisville and Nashville Railroad. Built in 1880, it stood at the corner of Pearl and Butler Streets just east of the L & N bridge. Pennsylvania Station was one of two stations in Downtown Cincinnati served by the PRR. The other was the Cincinnati, Lebanon and Northern Railway station on Court Street, after that line's acquisition by the PRR.

On April 2, 1933, all passenger service to Cincinnati was rerouted to Cincinnati Union Terminal, and Pennsylvania Station was abandoned.
