= Catharine Van Valkenburg Waite =

American lawyer (1829–1913)

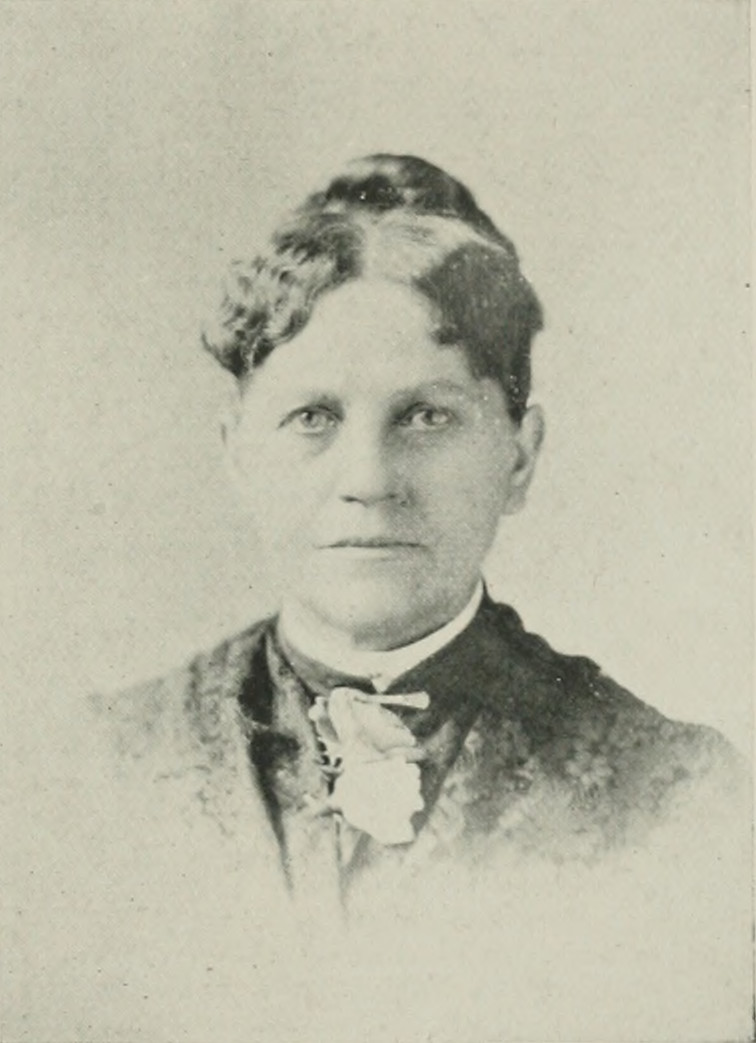
- Catharine Van Valkenburg Waite (1829-1913). Brand Portraits, 1886.
- Born: Catharine Van Valkenburg; 30 January 1829; Upper Canada
- Died: 9 November 1913 (aged 84); Park Ridge, Illinois
- Education: Knox College; Oberlin College; Union College of Law
- Occupation: lawyer
- Known for: president of the Woman's International Bar Association

Catharine Van Valkenburg Waite (30 January 1829, Dumfries, Ontario, Canada – 9 November 1913, Chicago, Illinois) was an American writer, lawyer, businesswoman, and women's suffrage activist.

== Biography ==
Born in British North America, Van Valkenburg moved with her family to Denmark, Iowa Territory at age 17.

She moved to Illinois in 1850 to study at Knox College. After transferring to Oberlin College in 1852, she tutored students in elocution and helped found a literary society. She graduated with honors in 1853 and married Charles Burlingame Waite the next year. They had eight children.

She was a graduate of the Union College of Law and a member of the Illinois bar. She made a practice of donating legal services to women who could not afford lawyers.

In 1859, after moving to Chicago's Hyde Park neighborhood, she established the Hyde Park Seminary for young women. The Waite family relocated to the Great Salt Lake Valley in 1862 after her husband Charles was appointed as an associate justice of the Supreme Court of Utah Territory by President Lincoln. There, the family was threatened by Mormons with violence after Congress passed laws against polygamy. Waite was the only non-Mormon in town and learned how to use a six-shooter. After finding the laws could not be enforced, Charles resigned his position and the family left the area. They were living in Idaho City when their first son was born.

She headed the publishing firm of C. V. Waite and Co., and wrote The Mormon Prophet and His Harem, based on what she had learned of the cruelties inflicted upon Mormon women under the leadership of Brigham Young.

The Waites moved back to Chicago in 1866. Waite, along with Mary Livermore and others, formed Chicago Sorosis in 1868, one of the United States' first women's clubs to promote women's welfare.

Along with Charles, Waite helped found the Illinois Woman Suffrage Association in 1869. Two years later, as part of a national effort by suffragists to test the newly adopted Fifteenth Amendment, she appeared at the polls to vote and was turned away. Charles, a lawyer, tried to overturn the refusal to permit her to vote with a court action, but was ultimately denied.

In 1874, she began a decade of editing the Crusader, a temperance paper.

She enrolled in the Union College of Law, the joint law department of the University of Chicago and Northwestern University, in 1885 at the age of 56. In 1886, she founded the Chicago Law Times, a quarterly magazine which she edited. At the International Council of Women at Washington, she was elected president of the Woman's International Bar Association, 26 March 1888.

Along with a number of other Chicago women leaders, Waite was involved in the planning of the World's Columbian Exposition in 1893. She was a founding member of the Queen Isabella Association.

Waite lived in Colorado during her later years, continuing to write and practice law. She died of heart disease of 9 November 1913 while visiting her daughter Lucy's home in Park Ridge, Illinois. Her cremated remains were interred at Chicago's Graceland Cemetery.

== Notes ==
Attribution
