= Charles Burlingame Waite =

American lawyer, jurist, and author

Charles Burlingame Waite (Wayne County, New York, 29 January 1824 – 1909) was an American lawyer, jurist and writer.

He was educated at Knox College, Illinois, studied law at Galesburg and Rock Island, and was admitted to the bar in 1847. After 15 years' successful practice, chiefly in Chicago, he was appointed by President Abraham Lincoln in 1862 associate justice of the Utah Supreme Court. In 1865 he resigned this post and became district attorney of Idaho, and a year later he returned to Chicago and devoted himself to literary pursuits.

In 1854 he married Catharine Van Valkenburg, also a lawyer and author and concerned in women's suffrage issues. They had eight children.

== Writings ==
- History of the Christian Religion to the Year Two Hundred. Chicago: C. V. Waite & Co. 1881.

He made numerous contributions to the press on suffrage and other politico-legal questions.
