= Henry Matson Waite (engineer) =

American army officer and engineer (1869–1944)

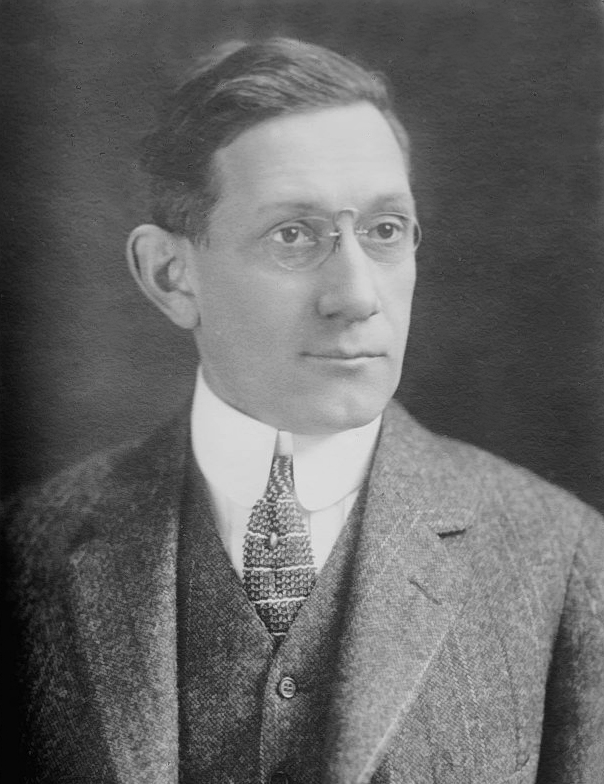

Colonel Henry Matson Waite (May 15, 1869 – September 2, 1944) was an engineer and the City Manager of Dayton, Ohio starting in 1913. He was the deputy administrator for the Public Works Administration from 1933 until September 1, 1935.

== Biography ==
He was born in Toledo, Ohio on May 15, 1869. He was the son of Henry Seldon Waite, the grandson of Morrison Waite, the Chief Justice of the United States Supreme Court and the great-grandson of his namesake, Connecticut judge and politician Henry Matson Waite. He graduated from Massachusetts Institute of Technology in 1890 then worked in railroad engineering and in coal mining. He then served as the city engineer for Cincinnati, Ohio from 1911 to 1913. He was then elected as the first city manager of Dayton, Ohio in 1913 where he served a four-year term.

He died on September 2, 1944.
