= Henry Matson Waite (judge) =

American judge

Henry Matson Waite (born Lyme, Connecticut, February 9, 1787; died in Lyme December 14, 1869) was a lawyer, judge, and chief justice of the Connecticut Supreme Court.

== Biography ==
From an old New England family, Waite was the son of Susanna (Matson) and Remick Waite. He was educated at Bacon Academy in Colchester and at Yale College, graduating from there in 1809. After several years of teaching school and studying law, he was admitted to the bar in 1812.

Waite represented Lyme in the Connecticut General Assembly in 1815 and 1826 and was elected to the Connecticut State Senate in 1830 and 1831. He was a member of the Federalist Party for as long as that party existed, and maintained similar political views for the rest of his life.

In 1834, Waite became an associate justice of the Connecticut Supreme Court (then called the "Supreme Court of Errors") and was chosen as chief justice in 1854. He retired on February 9, 1857 at the age of 70, as required by law. He suffered from a painful illness in his final years, but remained active.

In January 1816, Waite married Maria Selden, with whom he had 8 children. Their son Morrison R. Waite became a prominent Ohio lawyer and eventually served as chief justice of the United States Supreme Court.
