= National Register of Historic Places listings in Pulaski County, Indiana =

Location of Pulaski County in Indiana

This is a list of the National Register of Historic Places listings in Pulaski County, Indiana.

This is intended to be a complete list of the properties on the National Register of Historic Places in Pulaski County, Indiana, United States. Latitude and longitude coordinates are provided for many National Register properties; these locations may be seen together in a map.

There are eight properties listed on the National Register in the county, and one former listing.

Properties and districts located in incorporated areas display the name of the municipality, while properties and districts in unincorporated areas display the name of their civil township. Properties and districts split between multiple jurisdictions display the names of all jurisdictions.

This National Park Service list is complete through NPS recent listings posted November 28, 2025.

== Current listings ==
	Name on the Register	Image	Date listed	Location	City or town	Description
1	Chicago and Erie Railroad Tippecanoe River Bridge		May 16, 2022 (#100007738)	Former Chicago and Erie RR across Tippecanoe R. adjacent to bend in Three Mile Rd. 41°10′09″N 86°32′07″W	Monterey vicinity	
2	Francesville Commercial Historic District		September 2, 2025 (#100012176)	Each side of Montgomery Street between Brooks and Salem Streets and each side of Bill Street between Yellow and Lyman Streets; 40°59′07″N 86°52′55″W	Francesville	
3	Mallon Building	Mallon Building	September 17, 1999 (#99001151)	102 E. Montgomery St. 40°59′07″N 86°52′53″W	Francesville	
4	Pulaski County Courthouse	Pulaski County Courthouse	December 19, 2007 (#07001282)	112 E. Main St. 41°03′03″N 86°36′14″W	Winamac	
5	Pulaski County Home	Pulaski County Home	March 17, 2015 (#15000079)	700 W. 60 S. 41°02′46″N 86°37′00″W	Monroe Township	
6	Tepicon Hall	Tepicon Hall	April 3, 1992 (#92000189)	Tippecanoe River State Park, north of Winamac; 41°08′58″N 86°35′38″W	Franklin Township	
7	Dr. George W. Thompson House	Dr. George W. Thompson House	September 27, 1984 (#84001233)	407 N. Market St. 41°03′13″N 86°36′22″W	Winamac	
8	Vurpillat's Opera House	Vurpillat's Opera House	March 20, 2002 (#02000201)	Junction of Market and Main Sts. 41°03′04″N 86°36′15″W	Winamac	

== Former listings ==
	Name on the Register	Image	Date listed	Date removed	Location	City or town	Description
1	Monterey Bandstand	Monterey Bandstand	June 15, 2012 (#12000339)	November 15, 2022	Walnut St. 41°09′35″N 86°28′50″W	Monterey	

== See also ==
- List of National Historic Landmarks in Indiana
- National Register of Historic Places listings in Indiana
- Listings in neighboring counties: Cass, Fulton, Jasper, Marshall, Starke, White
- List of Indiana state historical markers in Pulaski County
