= List of killings by law enforcement officers in the United States, March 2017 =

This is a list of people reported killed by non-military law enforcement officers in the United States in March 2017, whether in the line of duty or not, and regardless of reason or method. The listing documents the occurrence of a death, making no implications regarding wrongdoing or justification on the part of the person killed or officer involved. Killings are arranged by date of the incident that caused death. Different death dates, if known, are noted in the description. The table below lists 93 people.

== March 2017 ==
| Date | Name (age) of deceased | Race | State (city) | Description |
|---|---|---|---|---|
| 2017-03-30 | Christopher Angelo Pizzichetta (46) | White | New Jersey (Cranbury) | |
| 2017-03-29 | Daniel Hendrix (26) | White | Tennessee (Chattanooga) | |
| 2017-03-29 | Doyle Wayne Johnson (59) | White | Oklahoma (Byars) | |
| 2017-03-29 | Frederick Ratliff (45) | White | Kentucky (Lawrenceburg) | |
| 2017-03-29 | Leroy Brown Jr. (28) | Black | Delaware (New Castle) | |
| 2017-03-29 | Unnamed male (28) | Unknown | Pennsylvania (Philadelphia) | |
| 2017-03-29 | Dennis Wasson II (27) | White | Texas (Ector) | |
| 2017-03-29 | Troy Boyle (41) | White | Illinois (Stockton) | |
| 2017-03-28 | Maria Lopez Carbajal/Maria Asucena Carbijal Lopez (15/16) | Hispanic | North Carolina (Anson County) | A North Carolina State Highway Patrol officer used a PIT maneuver on a fleeing vehicle driving along Route 74, causing the vehicle to crash and flip several times. Carabajal and Casterjon were killed and a third teenager injured. |
| 2017-03-28 | Kandy Casterjon (15) | Hispanic | North Carolina (Anson County) | A North Carolina State Highway Patrol officer used a PIT maneuver on a fleeing vehicle driving along Route 74, causing the vehicle to crash and flip several times. Carabajal and Casterjon were killed and a third teenager injured. |
| 2017-03-28 | Lee Pat Milks (73) | White | Michigan (Manistee) | |
| 2017-03-28 | Peter J. Doffin Jr. (36) | White | Indiana (Francesville) | |
| 2017-03-27 | Richard Alexander Tilley (28) | White | Maryland (Montgomery Village) | |
| 2017-03-27 | Steven Hopwood (51) | White | Tennessee (Lewisburg) | |
| 2017-03-27 | Pryor Spencer Bailey IV (45) | White | Mississippi (Mathiston) | |
| 2017-03-26 | Michael Hornibrook (54) | White | Arkansas (Little Rock) | |
| 2017-03-26 | Paul Parinella (53) | White | California (Anderson) | |
| 2017-03-26 | David Eric Ufferman (56) | White | Florida (Delray Beach) | |
| 2017-03-26 | Justin Quincy Smith (36) | Native American | Alaska (Wasilla) | |
| 2017-03-25 | Fred Barragán (35) | Hispanic | California (Los Angeles) | |
| 2017-03-24 | Matthew Gambaro (26) | Hispanic | Texas (Cisco) | |
| 2017-03-24 | Austin Macon (18) | White | California (Cottonwood) | |
| 2017-03-23 | Francisco Valdez (24) | Hispanic | Arizona (Phoenix) | |
| 2017-03-24 | Reno Joseph Owens Jr. (39) | Black | Maryland (Baltimore) | A homeless man who went to a home to sleep the night before brandished a knife at a four-year-old girl and a one-year-old boy. Police officers originally responded to the home because of a 911 call reporting that the man was acting erratically. The officers that initially responded declared a barricaded suspect situation, and a SWAT team was dispatched to the house. Negotiations between the police and the man lasted for an hour. The SWAT team opened fire, fearing that the children were in imminent danger. |
| 2017-03-23 | Stokes, William (51) | Black | Washington (Des Moines) | Stokes was reportedly using a machete to hold someone hostage. He refused to drop the weapon at the behest of police. An officer then fired on Stokes, killing him. |
| 2017-03-23 | Eddie Davis (42) | Black | Arkansas (Sheridan) | |
| 2017-03-22 | Nengmy Vang (45) | Asian | Wisconsin (Weston) | |
| 2017-03-22 | Don Johnson (27) | Black | Louisiana (Crowley) | |
| 2017-03-22 | Charles Harris (42) | White | Kentucky (Booneville) | |
| 2017-03-21 | Robert Lee Eichen (43) | Unknown race | California (Redwood City) | |
| 2017-03-21 | Alexander Dold (29) | White | Washington (Snohomish) | |
| 2017-03-20 | Clarence Duane Huderle (73) | Black | Minnesota (Warren) | |
| 2017-03-20 | Andrew Jared Lane (47) | White | California (Temple City) | |
| 2017-03-19 | Donald Gibbs (52) | Unknown race | California (Desert Hot Springs) | |
| 2017-03-19 | Christopher Delano Rosa (23) | White | California (Redding) | |
| 2017-03-19 | Alteria Woods (21) | Black | Florida (Vero Beach) | |
| 2017-03-19 | Mario Borges Simoes (45) | Hispanic | Florida (DeLand) | |
| 2017-03-19 | Trevor Allen Brice Gingras (19) | Black | Florida (Cape Canaveral) | |
| 2017-03-19 | Clifton Knickmeyer (59) | White | Missouri (Affton) | |
| 2017-03-18 | Kevin C. Perry (25) | Black | Kansas (Wichita) | |
| 2017-03-18 | Madison Sueann Dickson (21) | | Oklahoma (Tulsa) | Dickson, a woman who was wanted for various gun-related crimes, got into a pickup truck as a passenger when the police were searching her apartment to make an arrest. During the pursuit, she jumped out of the passenger seat and exchanged gunfire with at least two police officers after she brandished a handgun at them. During the altercation, she was struck fatally by a patrol cruiser. Police state that she was intentionally run over because of the danger she posed to both the officers and civilians. |
| 2017-03-18 | Willie Ivey III (29) | Black | Georgia (Atlanta) | |
| 2017-03-18 | Madison Sueann Dickson (21) | White | Oklahoma (Tulsa) | |
| 2017-03-18 | Jason Dennis Watkins (36) | White | Georgia (Cedartown) | |
| 2017-03-18 | Benjamin C. Barnes (42) | White | Idaho (Boise) | |
| 2017-03-17 | Desmond Phillips (25) | Black | California (Chico) | |
| 2017-03-17 | Nancy Lewellyn (59) | White | Tennessee (Lakeland) | |
| 2017-03-17 | Alejandro Gutierrez (44) | Hispanic | Colorado (Thornton) | |
| 2017-03-17 | Brentant Michael Lahey (25) | White | Maine (Presque Isle) | |
| 2017-03-16 | Patrick Earl Gatson (32) | Black | North Carolina (Fayetteville) | |
| 2017-03-16 | Rodney James Hess (36) | Black | Tennessee (Alamo) | |
| 2017-03-16 | Jermaine Claybrooks (32) | Black | Wisconsin (Milwaukee) | |
| 2017-03-16 | Daniel Donarski (58) | White | Florida (Deltona) | |
| 2017-03-16 | Frederick Ricardo Brown (34) | Black | Michigan (Warren) | |
| 2017-03-16 | Elena Mondragon (16) | Hispanic | California (Hayward) | Police officers from Fremont, California were attempting to pull over a stolen car that was wanted in connection with an armed robbery near California State University, East Bay. The vehicle went into reverse and rammed a police cruiser, the officers fired on the car, killing Mondragon. The three remaining occupants were arrested, with one being released. |
| 2017-03-15 | Cordale Quinn Handy (29) | Black | Minnesota (Saint Paul) | |
| 2017-03-15 | Todd Munson (25) | White | Arizona (Phoenix) | |
| 2017-03-14 | Christopher Apostolos (56) | White | New Jersey (Toms River) | |
| 2017-03-14 | Alexander Meltz (18) | White | Colorado (Westminster) | |
| 2017-03-14 | Shawn Anthony Dumitras (43) | White | Florida (Panama City Beach) | |
| 2017-03-14 | Rosa, Ryan L. (36) | White | Washington (Fife) | Investigators were attempting to apprehend Rosa, who was wanted on a felony warrant, having boxed in his car in a motel parking lot. Officers broke the windows of his car and pepper sprayed him. Rosa accelerated toward a deputy, knocking him down. When he began pulling the car forward, aiming it at the deputy a second time, an officer fired on Rosa, killing him. |
| 2017-03-13 | Noel Aaron Russell (23) | Whitee | California (Napa) | Napa Police, responding to reports of man armed with a knife "acting crazy" in a Home Depot parking lot, encountered Russell. The incident escalated and the officers shot and killed Russell. |
| 2017-03-13 | Rashad Daquan Opher (20) | Black | Maryland (Gwynn Oak) | |
| 2017-03-13 | Luke O. Stewart (23) | Black | Ohio (Euclid) | |
| 2017-03-12 | Michael Anthony Perez (33) | Hispanic | California (Orange) | Perez' vehicle was pulled over by Orange Police for a broken taillight and a warrant. When he refused to exit the vehicle and police saw that he had a lighter and what appeared to be a gasoline container a firehose was used on him. When he did come out police saw that he had a knife. Police shot and killed him. |
| 2017-03-12 | Gonzalez, Manuel (28) | Hispanic | Washington (Bellingham) | After getting in an altercation with a woman, Gonzalez stabbed a man in the neck who attempted to intervene. Gonzalez fled on foot and was followed by several witnesses, who confronted him. Fighting ensued and Gonzalez repeatedly tried to stab the witnesses. When officers arrived on scene, they yelled at him to drop the knife. Gonzalez reportedly told police to shoot him. He lunged at an officer, who fired four shots at Gonzalez, killing him. |
| 2017-03-11 | Mark Robert Carlberg (51) | White | Texas (Midlothian) | |
| 2017-03-11 | Sherida Davis (38) | Black | Wisconsin (Milwaukee) | |
| 2017-03-11 | Brandon Wiley (30) | Black | Louisiana (Baton Rouge) | |
| 2017-03-10 | Damon Seitz (40) | White | California (Escondido) | |
| 2017-03-09 | Toni Jo Collins (35) | White | Texas (Galveston) | |
| 2017-03-09 | Steven Schiltz (29) | White | California (Huntington Beach) | |
| 2017-03-09 | Jesus Alberto Geney Montes (24) | Hispanic | California (Santa Clara) | Police were responding to a 911 call reporting that Montes barricaded himself in a two-story four-plex and had stabbed himself in the chest. The officers were also warned that he was carrying a handgun. When contact was made, Montes ran toward the back of the complex and jumped over a fence. When the officers caught up at an intersection, Montes threatened to shoot the officers and himself. They requested medical aid for him, but to no avail. A taser was deployed, but it did not affect Montes. He refused to put his hands up, and officer Colin Stewart fatally shot him, fearing that he was armed. No weapon was found on the body or in the immediate vicinity, but a bloody knife was found on a path. |
| 2017-03-08 | unidentified male | Unknown | Florida (Winter Haven) | A suicidal suspect allegedly rammed several civilian vehicles with his truck as he fled officers, injuring one person. On Route 27, a deputy conducted a PIT maneuver, forcing the vehicle off the road. The driver, who was not wearing a seatbelt, was ejected from the vehicle and killed. |
| 2017-03-08 | Iarsalov Mosiiuk (25) | White | North Carolina (Charlotte) | Police responded to a call from one of Mosiiuk's relatives claiming that he was acting erratic and suicidal. On arriving at the house officers said that Mosiiuk was holding a rifle and acting in a threatening manner. One of the officers opened fire when he believed Mosiiuk was pointing the rifle at another officer, and killed him. |
| 2017-03-08 | Unnamed man | Unknown race | California (Perris) | |
| 2017-03-08 | Frank W. Wratny (91) | White | Pennsylvania (Union Township) | A 91-year-old man was shot and killed by police Wednesday night after the man confronted officers with a firearm from the front door of his home in Lawrence County. Police officers from Union Township went to the home after a woman called 911, claiming her uncle had just shot her. State police at New Castle said Frank W. Wratny, of Spring Street, Union, was killed in a more than one-hour standoff in a rural area outside New Castle. Mr. Wratny had no criminal history, according to court records. |
| 2017-03-07 | Roy Dale Evans Jr. (38) | White | Ohio (Medina) | A Strongsville police officer shot and killed a suspect involved in a police chase on Interstate 71 early Tuesday. The chase started after police attempted to stop a vehicle for a traffic violation on Pearl Road around 2:30 a.m. The driver failed to stop and continued to speed, police said. The pursuit ended at I-271 and I-71. An officer fired his weapon at least one time, killing the driver. A woman and three children were also in the van with the Victim. |
| 2017-03-07 | Dennis Todd Rogers (41) | Black | California (Ladera Heights) | |
| 2017-03-06 | Dean Bellamy (47) | White | Washington (Spokane) | |
| 2017-03-04 | Edward Manning III (23) | White | California (Cabazon) | |
| 2017-03-04 | Alejandro Valencia Mendez (70) | Hispanic | California (Los Angeles) | |
| 2017-03-04 | George Lee Seeton (38) | White | Oklahoma (Oklahoma City) | |
| 2017-03-04 | Terry DiFalco (14) | White | New Jersey (Westfield) | |
| 2017-03-03 | Michael Kocher (32) | White | Colorado (Englewood) | |
| 2017-03-03 | Dave Phoenix (25) | Native American | California (Santa Rosa Rancheria) | A law enforcement task force responded to reports of an armed man threatening residents of the Santa Rosa Rancheria Indian reservation near Lemoore. A Kings County Sheriff spokesman reported that when the officers tried to arrest Dave Phoenix he pointed a gun at them. An Avenal Police officer shot Phoenix, who later died at Adventist Medical Center in Hanford. The gun turned out to be a replica. |
| 2017-03-02 | Michael Cisneros (27) | Hispanic | Arizona (Phoenix) | |
| 2017-03-02 | John Hall (33) | White | Wisconsin (Wausau) | |
| 2017-03-02 | Isidro Bazan Jr. (34) | Hispanic | California (San Marcos) | |
| 2017-03-02 | Rafael Navarro-Garcia (25) | Hispanic | Nevada (Reno) | |
| 2017-03-02 | Ramon Andrade (37) | Hispanic | New Jersey (Paterson) | |
| 2017-03-01 | Jose Olivares (43) | | Louisiana (Houma) | The shooting occurred shortly after 7 p.m. at a trailer park in the 100 block of Agnes Street. Investigators said Jose Olivares, 43, had barricaded himself from the police when he was shot. Houma police were the only agency involved in the shooting and notified state police about the incident. Additional details were not released by investigators. |
| 2017-03-01 | Epthen Lamont Johnson (40) | Black | Texas (Lufkin) | Lufkin police say one of their officers was forced to shoot a suspect who would not stop stabbing another man. When the officer arrived at 620 Kurth Drive, the two men were fighting on the ground. According to the officer, the suspect did not obey several verbal commands. The officer shot the suspect, who later died from his wounds. |

== See also ==
- Death in custody § United States
- Henry A. Wallace Police Crime Public Database
- List of cases of police brutality
- List of countries with annual rates and counts for killings by law enforcement officers
- List of law enforcement officers killed in the line of duty in the United States
- List of law enforcement officers convicted for an on-duty killing in the United States
- List of shootings by US immigration agents
- List of police reforms related to the George Floyd protests
- List of unarmed African Americans killed by law enforcement officers in the United States
- Lists of killings by law enforcement officers
- Police brutality in the United States
- Police misconduct § United States
- Police riot § United States
- Police use of deadly force in the United States
