= List of Indiana state historical markers in Pulaski County =

Location of Pulaski County in Indiana

This is a list of the Indiana state historical markers in Pulaski County.

This is intended to be a detailed table of the official state historical marker placed in Pulaski County, Indiana, United States by the Indiana Historical Bureau. The location of the historical marker and its latitude and longitude coordinates are included below when available, along with its name, year of placement, and topics as recorded by the Historical Bureau. There is 1 historical marker located in Pulaski County.

== Historical markers ==
Marker title	Image	Year placed	Location	Topics
First Indiana Natural Gas Well		1988	Western side of U.S. Route 421, about 1.5 miles south of Francesville, across from the quarry entrance 40°57′46″N 86°53′30″W	Business, Industry, and Labor

== See also ==
- List of Indiana state historical markers
- National Register of Historic Places listings in Pulaski County, Indiana
