= Oakland, Lawrence County, Pennsylvania =

Unincorporated community in Pennsylvania, US

Oakland, Pennsylvania
- Census-designated place
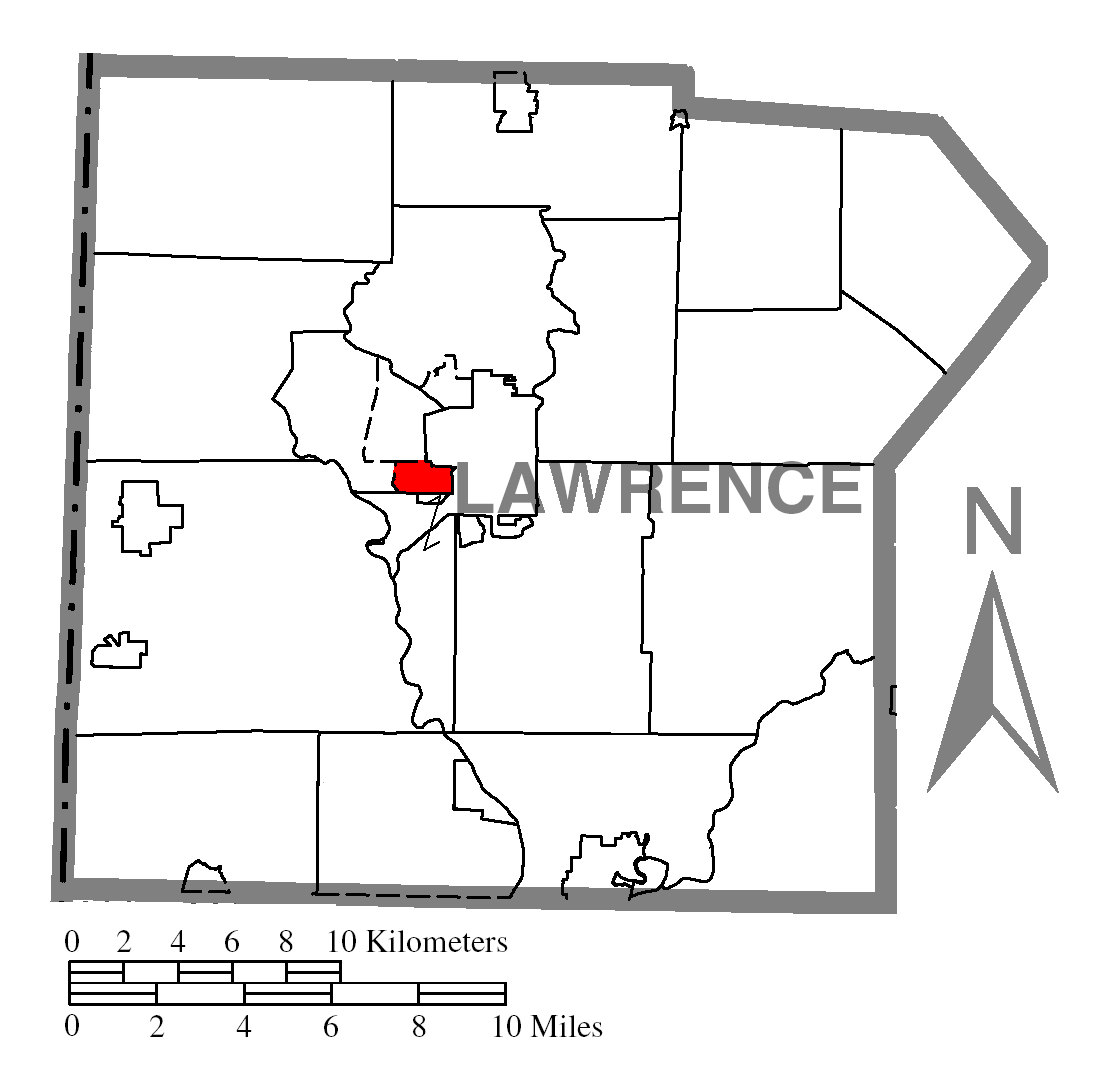
- Location in Lawrence County

- Location in Pennsylvania Location in the United States
- Coordinates: 40°59′27″N 80°21′46″W
- Country: United States
- State: Pennsylvania
- County: Lawrence
- Township: Union

Area
  - Total: 0.93 sq mi (2.41 km^{2})
  - Land: 0.92 sq mi (2.38 km^{2})
  - Water: 0.015 sq mi (0.04 km^{2})
- Elevation: 1,105 ft (337 m)

Population (2020)
  - Total: 1,437
  - Density: 1,566.1/sq mi (604.66/km^{2})
- Time zone: UTC-4 (EST)
  - Summer (DST): UTC-5 (EDT)
- Area code: 724
- FIPS code: 42-56000
- GNIS feature ID: 2389605

Oakland is an unincorporated area and census-designated place (CDP) in Lawrence County, Pennsylvania, United States. The population was 1,569 at the 2010 census.

== Geography ==
Oakland is located in central Lawrence County at 40°59′27″N 80°21′46″W (40.990795, -80.362675). It sits in the southeastern corner of Union Township, bordered to the south and east by the city of New Castle, the Lawrence county seat, and to the north by Oakwood.

According to the United States Census Bureau, the CDP has a total area of 0.93 square miles (2.4 km^{2}), of which 0.02 square miles (0.04 km^{2}), or 1.55%, are water. The community sits on a hill overlooking the Shenango River to the east. The Shenango is a southward-flowing tributary of the Beaver River and is part of the Ohio River watershed.

== Demographics ==
Historical population
Census	Pop.	Note	%±
2020	1,437		—
U.S. Decennial Census

As of the census of 2000, there were 1,516 people, 617 households, and 434 families residing in the CDP. The population density was 1,653.3 inhabitants per square mile (638.3/km^{2}). There were 656 housing units at an average density of 715.4 per square mile (276.2/km^{2}). The racial makeup of the CDP was 92.22% White, 6.79% African American, 0.20% Asian, 0.40% from other races, and 0.40% from two or more races. Hispanic or Latino of any race were 0.33% of the population.

There were 617 households, out of which 27.7% had children under the age of 18 living with them, 53.3% were married couples living together, 12.0% had a female householder with no husband present, and 29.5% were non-families. 26.6% of all households were made up of individuals, and 16.7% had someone living alone who was 65 years of age or older. The average household size was 2.46 and the average family size was 2.97.

In the CDP, the population was spread out, with 21.5% under the age of 18, 7.5% from 18 to 24, 26.2% from 25 to 44, 22.9% from 45 to 64, and 21.9% who were 65 years of age or older. The median age was 42 years. For every 100 females, there were 93.4 males. For every 100 females age 18 and over, there were 92.6 males.

The median income for a household in the CDP was $37,885, and the median income for a family was $40,450. Males had a median income of $36,500 versus $19,674 for females. The per capita income for the CDP was $15,015. About 5.5% of families and 7.6% of the population were below the poverty line, including 7.8% of those under age 18 and 7.9% of those age 65 or over.
