= Oakwood, Pennsylvania =

Unincorporated community in Pennsylvania, US

- Census-designated place
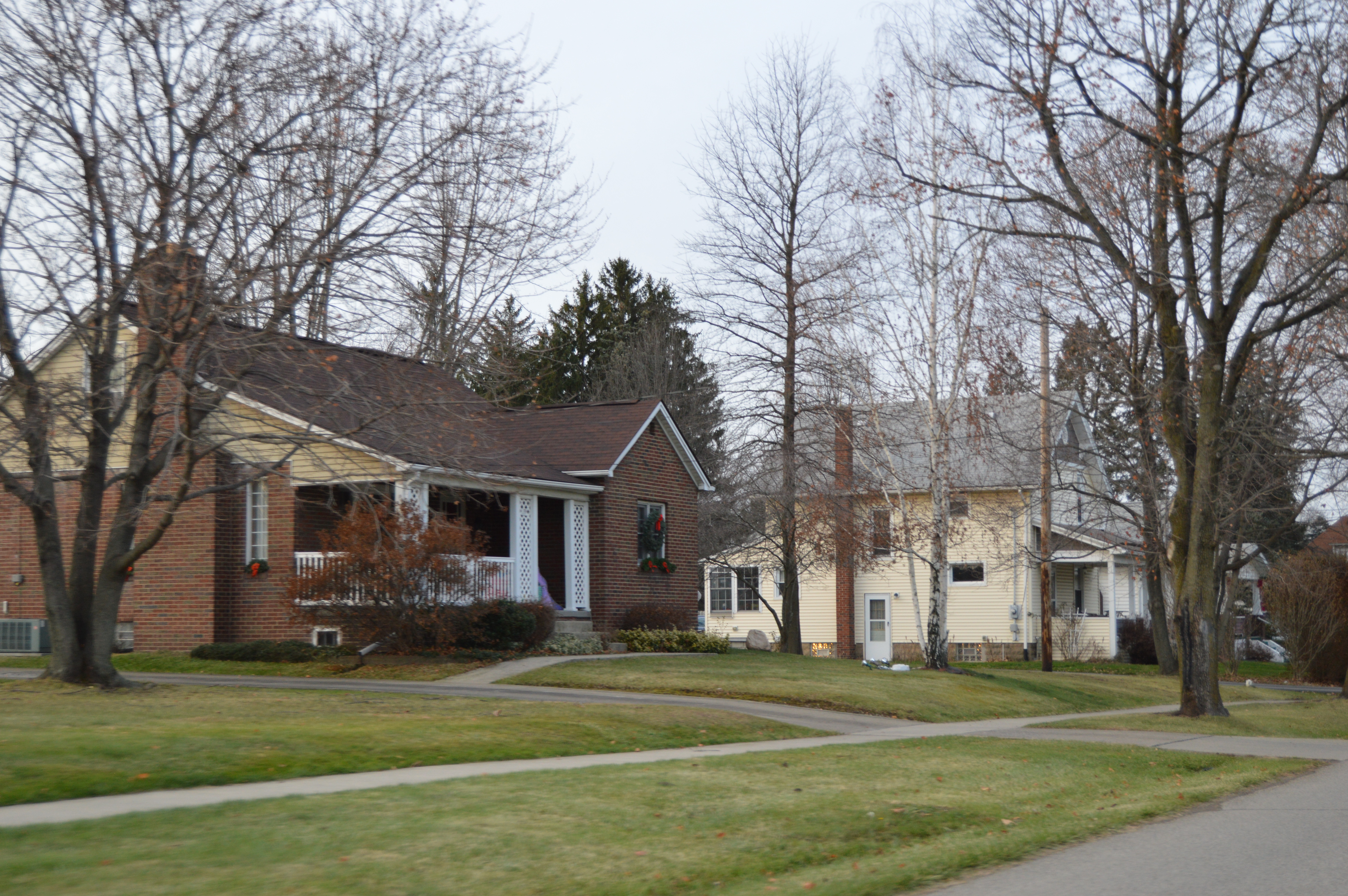
- Houses on King Avenue

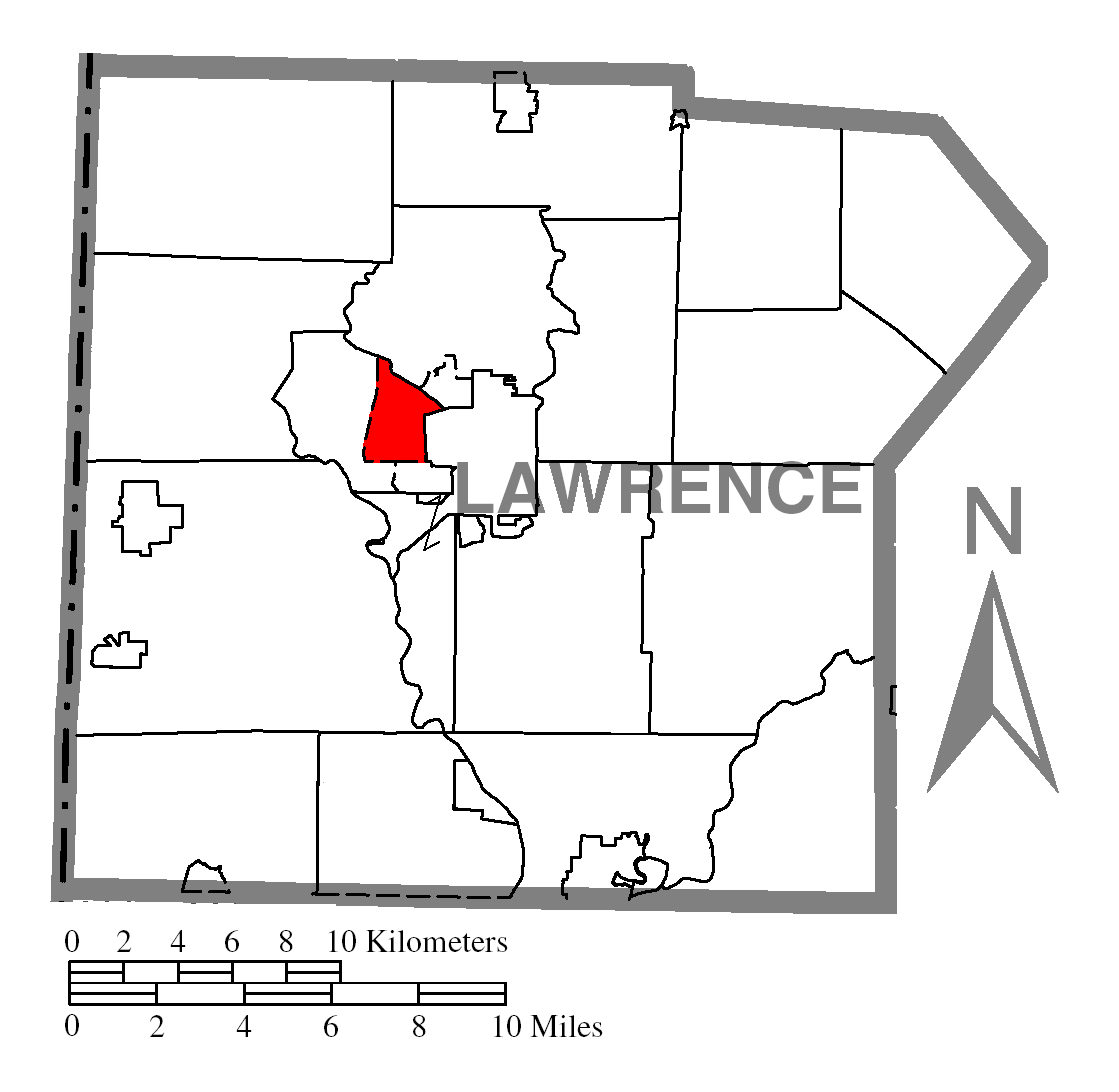
- Location in Lawrence County

- Location in Pennsylvania Location in the United States
- Coordinates: 41°0′25″N 80°22′35″W
- Country: United States
- State: Pennsylvania
- County: Lawrence
- Township: Union

Area
  - Total: 2.64 sq mi (6.84 km^{2})
  - Land: 2.59 sq mi (6.70 km^{2})
  - Water: 0.054 sq mi (0.14 km^{2})
- Elevation: 1,025 ft (312 m)

Population (2020)
  - Total: 2,215
  - Density: 856.4/sq mi (330.67/km^{2})
- Time zone: UTC-4 (EST)
  - Summer (DST): UTC-5 (EDT)
- Area code: 724
- FIPS code: 42-56232
- GNIS feature ID: 2389607

Oakwood is an unincorporated area and census-designated place (CDP) in Lawrence County, Pennsylvania, United States. The population was 2,270 at the 2010 census.

== Geography ==
Oakwood is located in central Lawrence County at 41°0′25″N 80°22′35″W (41.007064, -80.376461), in the eastern part of Union Township. It is bordered to the east by the city of New Castle, to the northeast by Neshannock Township, to the west by Interstate 376, and to the south by the Oakland CDP in Union Township.

I-376 leads north 13 miles (21 km) to Interstate 80 near Sharon and south the same distance to the Pennsylvania Turnpike in Big Beaver. U.S. Route 224 (West State Street) is the main road through the center of Oakwood, leading east to its terminus in the center of New Castle and west 16 miles (26 km) to Boardman, Ohio, on the southern outskirts of Youngstown. U.S. Route 422 (Sampson Street) runs up the Shenango River valley along the northeastern edge of the community, leading southeast into New Castle and northwest 16 miles (26 km) to Youngstown, Ohio.

According to the United States Census Bureau, the Oakwood CDP has a total area of 2.7 square miles (6.9 km^{2}), of which 2.6 square miles (6.8 km^{2}) are land and 0.04 square miles (0.1 km^{2}), of 2.01%, are water. The Shenango River forms the northeastern border of the community and of Union Township. The Shenango is a southeastward-flowing tributary of the Beaver River, part of the Ohio River watershed.

== Demographics ==
Historical population
Census	Pop.	Note	%±
2020	2,215		—
U.S. Decennial Census

As of the census of 2000, there were 2,249 people, 949 households, and 664 families residing in the CDP. The population density was 877.0 inhabitants per square mile (338.6/km^{2}). There were 978 housing units at an average density of 381.4 per square mile (147.3/km^{2}). The racial makeup of the CDP was 94.66% White, 3.82% African American, 0.13% Asian, 0.40% from other races, and 0.98% from two or more races. Hispanic or Latino of any race were 0.76% of the population.

There were 949 households, out of which 20.3% had children under the age of 18 living with them, 54.4% were married couples living together, 12.2% had a female householder with no husband present, and 30.0% were non-families. 27.4% of all households were made up of individuals, and 16.8% had someone living alone who was 65 years of age or older. The average household size was 2.35 and the average family size was 2.84.

In the CDP the population was spread out, with 17.1% under the age of 18, 6.5% from 18 to 24, 24.3% from 25 to 44, 26.8% from 45 to 64, and 25.3% who were 65 years of age or older. The median age was 46 years. For every 100 females there were 90.1 males. For every 100 females age 18 and over, there were 87.9 males.

The median income for a household in the CDP was $32,202, and the median income for a family was $40,565. Males had a median income of $31,121 versus $21,550 for females. The per capita income for the CDP was $16,930. About 4.4% of families and 6.9% of the population were below the poverty line, including 7.2% of those under age 18 and 5.3% of those age 65 or over.
