= Pulaski County Courthouse (Indiana) =

- U.S. National Register of Historic Places
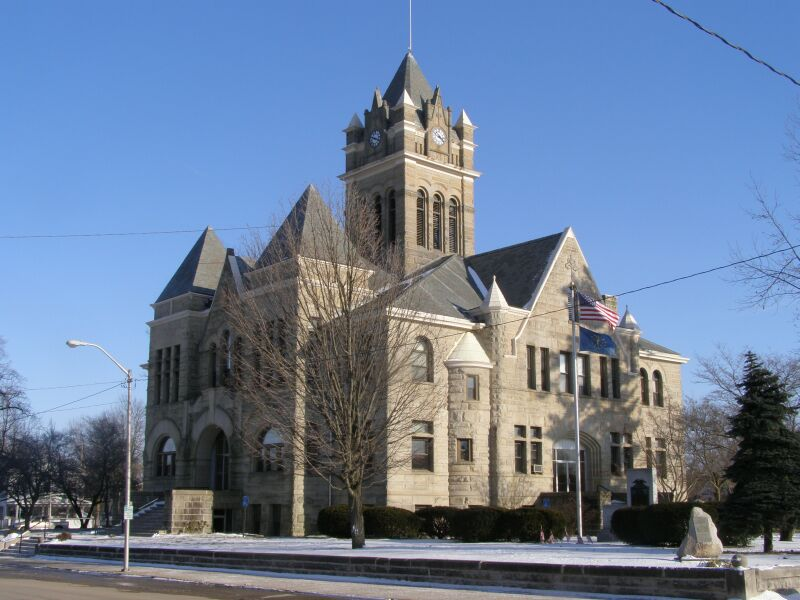
- Pulaski County Courthouse, January 2011

- Location within Indiana Location within the United States
- Interactive map showing the location of Pulaski County Courthouse
- Location: 112 E Main St., Winamac, Indiana
- Coordinates: 41°3′3″N 86°36′14″W
- Area: less than one acre
- Built: 1894-1895
- Built by: Gibson, Jordon E.
- Architect: Rush, A.W.
- Architectural style: Romanesque
- NRHP reference No.: 07001282
- Added to NRHP: December 19, 2007

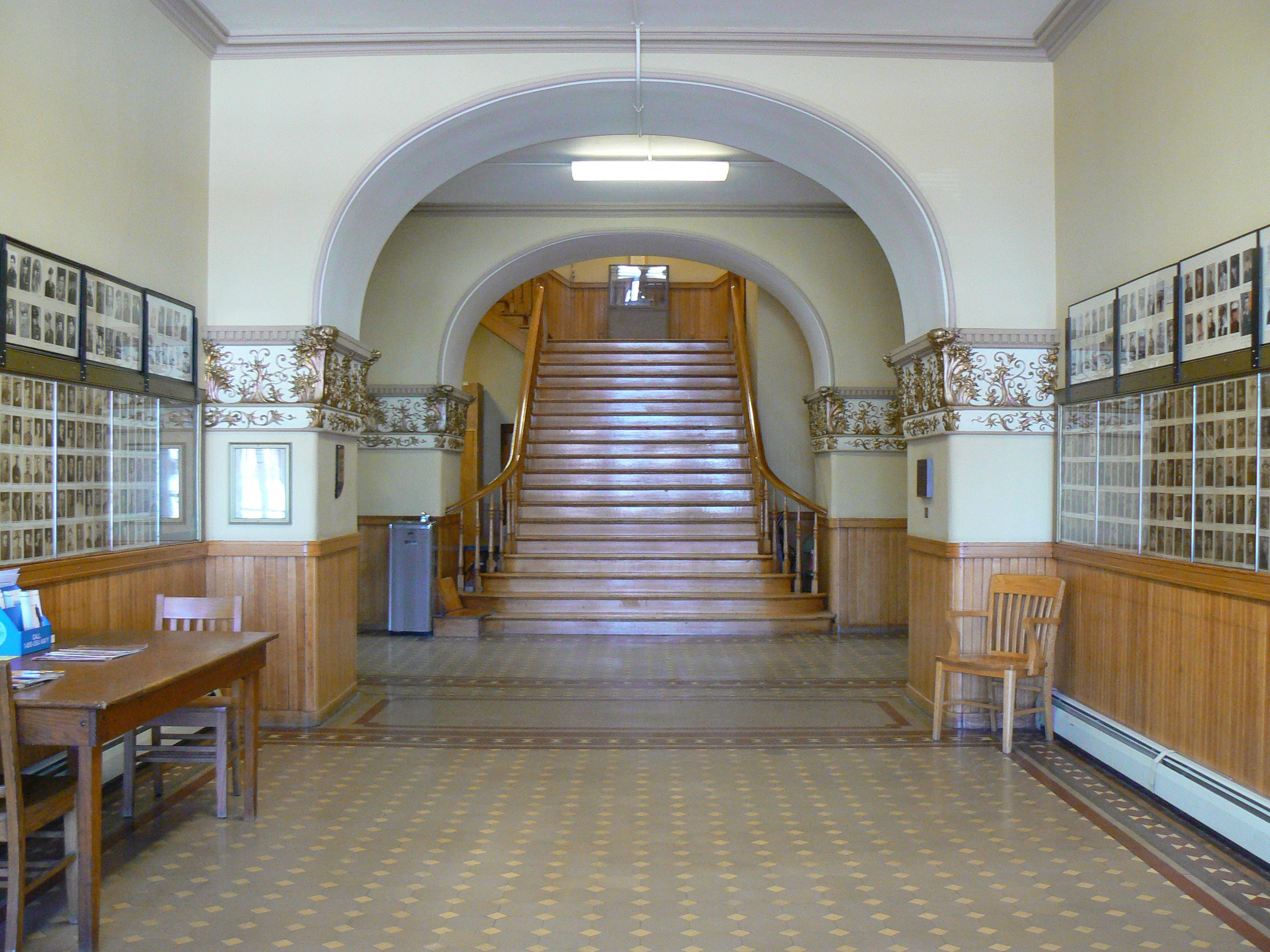
Interior of Pulaski County Courthouse

Pulaski County Courthouse is a historic courthouse located at Winamac, Indiana. It was built in 1894–1895, and is a massive three-story, nearly square, Romanesque Revival style limestone building. It measures 88 feet by 90 feet and is topped by a slate hipped roof. The building features a 106 feet tall square clock tower topped by a pyramidal roof. Located on the courthouse lawn are the contributing drinking fountain and steps (c. 1940); monument to World War I, World War II, and Korean War veterans (1949); and a concrete obelisk.

It was listed on the National Register of Historic Places in 2007.
