= Monterey Bandstand =

- Formerly listed on the U.S. National Register of Historic Places
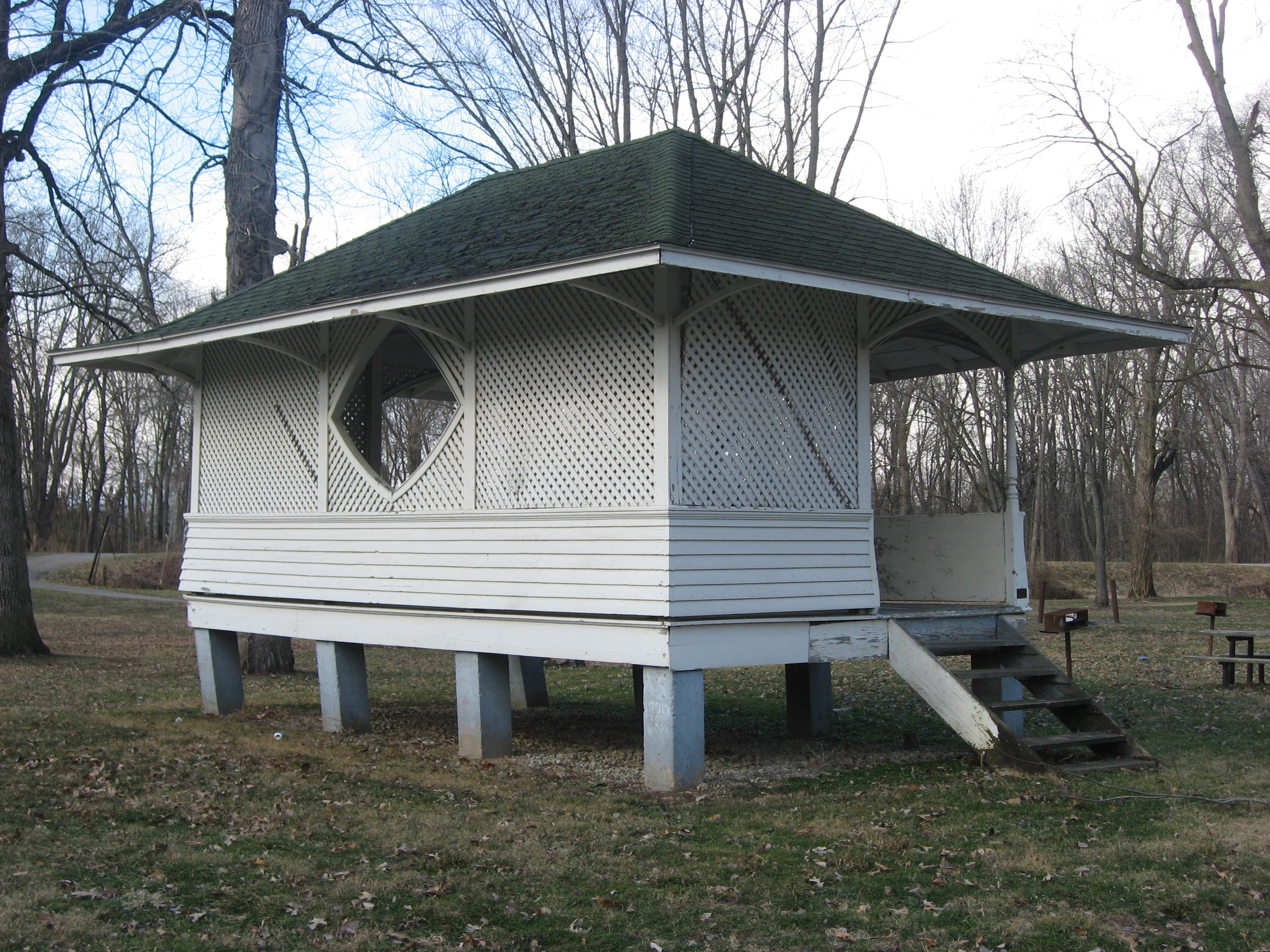
- Monterey Bandstand, January 2013

- Location within Indiana Location within the United States
- Location: Walnut St., Monterey, Indiana
- Coordinates: 41°9′35″N 86°28′50″W
- Area: 0.01 acres (0.0040 ha)
- Built: 1912
- Built by: Hay, Abraham "Abe"
- Architectural style: Queen Anne
- NRHP reference No.: 12000339

Significant dates
- Added to NRHP: June 15, 2012
- Removed from NRHP: November 15, 2022

Monterey Bandstand, also known as Kleckner Park Bandstand, is a historic bandstand located at Monterey, Indiana. It was built in 1912, and is a wood-frame structure measuring 12 feet 6 inches wide and 20 feet long. It is raised on 30 inch high piers. The building has a hipped roof and exhibits Queen Anne style design elements. The bandstand was restored in 1979.

It was listed on the National Register of Historic Places in 2012.

The grandstand has deteriorated during the last several years due to flooding, weather and some vandalism. It has been sold to a private owner and will soon no longer be the property of the town of Monterey. The structure must be removed by the owner by Feb. 24, 2017.
