= Mallon Building =

- U.S. National Register of Historic Places
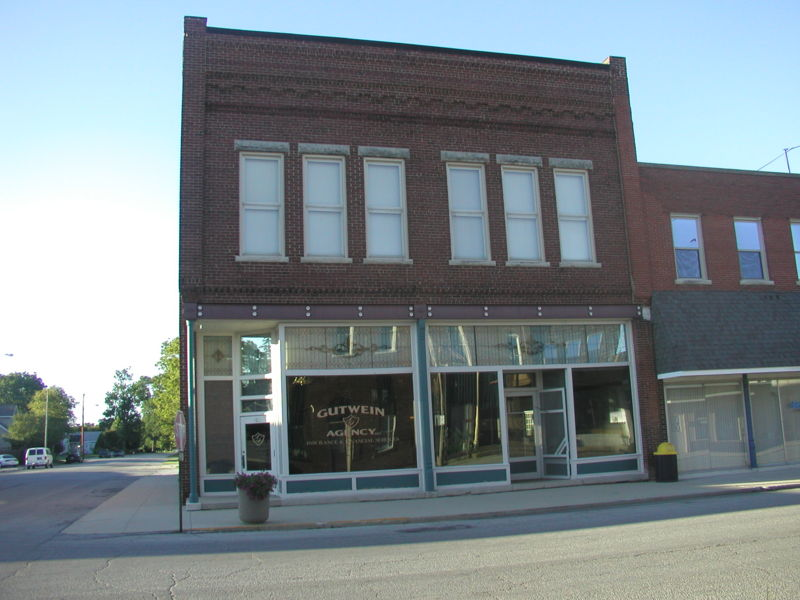
- Contemporary View, Mallon/Minkert Building

- Location within Indiana Location within the United States
- Location: 102 E. Montgomery St., Francesville, Indiana
- Coordinates: 40°59′7″N 86°52′53″W
- Area: less than one acre
- Built: 1899
- Architect: Skinner, G.A.
- Architectural style: Early Commercial
- NRHP reference No.: 99001151
- Added to NRHP: September 17, 1999

The Mallon/Minkert building, at the northeast corner of Montgomery and Bill streets in Francesville, Indiana was built by local businessman John H. Mallon in 1899. It replaced a frame structure on the same site, built in 1872, which burned. Mallon came to Francesville from Morgan County, Indiana in 1865, and in 1868 began to clerk with Samuel Reishling, who is credited as having begun the second-ever business in the town. A few years later Mallon struck out on his own, and the 1883 history of the county says of him, "He is probably doing the leading business of this town." It was built in 1899, and is a two-story, rectangular brick building measuring 40 feet wide and 80 feet deep.

After Mallon's death in 1915 the store was taken over by his son Cecil, who operated it until 1949, 77 years of continuous business under the ownership of father and son.

The store had an extremely close call in December, 1945, when a massive fire enveloped the block of buildings to its immediate east, on a bitterly cold night. Francesville historian Alyce Onken remembers standing on the street during the fire looking at the building, thinking, "It's gone for sure." Miraculously, despite the near-total destruction of its neighbors, the building survived with only minor damage. A careful eye will note a cosmetic repair to the east wall as the only reminder of the calamity.

Many current residents of the town remember the store under the tenure of its second owners, Oscar and Jean Minkert. They came from North Judson to open Minkert's Dry Goods and Variety Store in 1949. Until Oscar's death in 1992 it retained the same old-fashioned look and feel of its predecessor, as well some of its longstanding stock of dry goods and merchandise. To visit Minkert's was to take a trip through time to a now-lost era in American retailing, with high ceilings, narrow aisles, hand-crafted wooden display cases, and husband-and-wife proprietors who knew their customers as friends.

After Minkert died the building was purchased by Edison and Chrisann Gutwein, who moved their insurance business from a smaller building on Bill Street into the two-story structure. It was during their tenure that Mrs. Gutwein took an interest in the building's history, and she supervised its restoration back to the genteel beauty of its turn-of-the century provenance. She also did the research that in 1999 led to its addition to the National Register of Historic Places, one of the few structures in the county so far to achieve that designation.

In 2002 the building and insurance business were sold to Dennis and Kitty Gutwein, the fourth, and current, owners. The building is used for multiple commercial purposes.

The Mallon/Minkert building is almost completely intact and original, and is a notable historical asset.
