= Winamac, Indiana =

Winamac
- Town
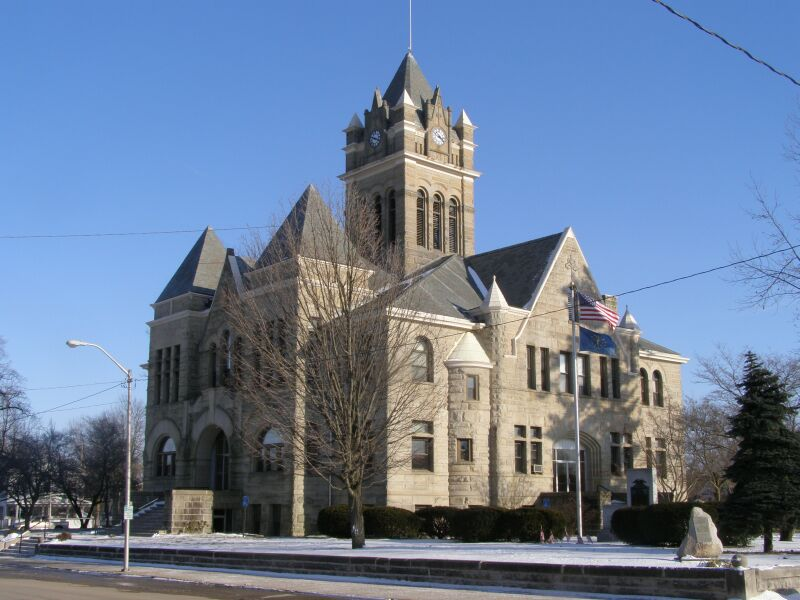
- Pulaski County Courthouse

- Seal
- Motto: "Built On The Tippecanoe River"
- Location of Winamac in Pulaski County, Indiana.
- Coordinates: 41°03′13″N 86°36′13″W
- Country: United States
- State: Indiana
- County: Pulaski
- Township: Monroe
- Founder: John Pearson

Government
  - Type: Town Council
  - President: Larry Weaver
  - Vice President: Alvin Parish
  - Member: Judy Heater
  - Member: Tom J. Murray
  - Member: Danyelle Weaver
  - Town Manager: Brad Zellers

Area
  - Total: 1.36 sq mi (3.53 km^{2})
  - Land: 1.36 sq mi (3.53 km^{2})
  - Water: 0 sq mi (0.00 km^{2})
- Elevation: 702 ft (214 m)

Population (2020)
  - Total: 2,318
  - Density: 1,702.7/sq mi (657.42/km^{2})
- Time zone: UTC-5 (Eastern(EST))
  - Summer (DST): UTC-4 (EDT)
- ZIP code: 46996
- Area code: 574
- FIPS code: 18-84734
- GNIS feature ID: 2397747
- Website: www.in.gov/towns/winamac/

Winamac is a town in Monroe Township, Pulaski County, in the U.S. state of Indiana. As of the 2020 census, Winamac had a population of 2,318. It is the county seat of Pulaski County.

== History ==
The town's name came from the Potawatomi word for "catfish." It was selected as the county seat in 1839. Winamac was incorporated as a town in 1868.

The Winamac post office has been in operation since 1839.

Pulaski County Courthouse, Dr. George W. Thompson House, and Vurpillat's Opera House are listed on the National Register of Historic Places.

== Notable Landmarks ==
Winamac has several local landmarks scattered throughout the town.

=== The Artesian Well ===
In June 1877, the Winamac Gas and Oil company began drilling near the Tippecanoe River. Instead of oil, they discovered a water vein at 264 feet below the ground. In the following years, demand for the well's water created a small industry within the community, and local boys ventured to earn money by delivering this water to homes. During this time, the water was marketed as containing healing properties. Interest in the well had died down by the end of the 19th century. By 1920, the well had fallen victim to vandalism and decay, and was subsequently repaired. Unfortunately, the well's water pressure was later compromised by other local projects, causing it to dry up. It was capped, and an informational plaque was dedicated to the well on the 100th anniversary of its drilling. Today, it stands as a reminder of local history on the west side of the town park.

=== The Memorial Swinging Bridge ===
The Winamac Town Park is home to a large suspension bridge called "The Swinging Bridge" over the Tippecanoe River. This bridge was dedicated on July 4, 1923, in honor of soldiers and sailors from the Civil War onward. It has since been a popular local attraction, serving as the subject of many greeting cards and photoshoots since its dedication.

In 2020, the "Light Up Our Legacy Project" began, hoping to raise money to install LED lights on the bridge. The goal was reached, and the bridge underwent renovations through early spring of 2023, with the goal of unveiling the lights on July 4, 2023.

== Geography ==
According to the 2010 census, Winamac has a total area of 1.36 square miles (3.52 km^{2}), all land.

=== Climate ===
Climate data for Winamac, Indiana (1991–2020 normals, extremes 1897–1906, 1918–present)
Month	Jan	Feb	Mar	Apr	May	Jun	Jul	Aug	Sep	Oct	Nov	Dec	Year
Record high °F (°C)	71 (22)	75 (24)	86 (30)	92 (33)	96 (36)	108 (42)	109 (43)	103 (39)	101 (38)	92 (33)	82 (28)	71 (22)	109 (43)
Mean maximum °F (°C)	54.3 (12.4)	57.3 (14.1)	70.9 (21.6)	80.2 (26.8)	87.9 (31.1)	91.9 (33.3)	92.1 (33.4)	90.9 (32.7)	89.8 (32.1)	82.4 (28.0)	69.0 (20.6)	57.1 (13.9)	94.0 (34.4)
Mean daily maximum °F (°C)	32.5 (0.3)	36.3 (2.4)	47.8 (8.8)	60.7 (15.9)	71.8 (22.1)	80.7 (27.1)	83.5 (28.6)	81.9 (27.7)	76.6 (24.8)	64.2 (17.9)	49.1 (9.5)	37.2 (2.9)	60.2 (15.7)
Daily mean °F (°C)	24.1 (−4.4)	27.3 (−2.6)	37.6 (3.1)	49.5 (9.7)	60.8 (16.0)	70.1 (21.2)	73.0 (22.8)	71.3 (21.8)	64.8 (18.2)	52.9 (11.6)	40.1 (4.5)	29.5 (−1.4)	50.1 (10.1)
Mean daily minimum °F (°C)	15.8 (−9.0)	18.3 (−7.6)	27.5 (−2.5)	38.3 (3.5)	49.8 (9.9)	59.4 (15.2)	62.6 (17.0)	60.6 (15.9)	53.1 (11.7)	41.7 (5.4)	31.0 (−0.6)	21.8 (−5.7)	40.0 (4.4)
Mean minimum °F (°C)	−6.1 (−21.2)	−1.0 (−18.3)	11.4 (−11.4)	23.7 (−4.6)	34.9 (1.6)	44.8 (7.1)	51.3 (10.7)	50.8 (10.4)	39.8 (4.3)	28.2 (−2.1)	17.0 (−8.3)	3.1 (−16.1)	−9.9 (−23.3)
Record low °F (°C)	−29 (−34)	−21 (−29)	−9 (−23)	8 (−13)	22 (−6)	32 (0)	41 (5)	34 (1)	24 (−4)	16 (−9)	−10 (−23)	−25 (−32)	−29 (−34)
Average precipitation inches (mm)	2.52 (64)	2.07 (53)	2.49 (63)	3.71 (94)	4.10 (104)	4.27 (108)	4.73 (120)	4.18 (106)	3.36 (85)	3.16 (80)	2.84 (72)	2.38 (60)	39.81 (1,011)
Average snowfall inches (cm)	9.5 (24)	6.5 (17)	3.5 (8.9)	0.4 (1.0)	0.0 (0.0)	0.0 (0.0)	0.0 (0.0)	0.0 (0.0)	0.0 (0.0)	0.0 (0.0)	1.0 (2.5)	5.6 (14)	26.5 (67)
Average precipitation days (≥ 0.01 in)	10.7	8.5	9.8	11.1	12.7	11.7	10.4	9.4	9.1	10.7	10.0	10.5	124.6
Average snowy days (≥ 0.1 in)	4.9	3.7	1.8	0.3	0.0	0.0	0.0	0.0	0.0	0.0	0.8	3.3	14.8
Source: NOAA

== Demographics ==
Historical population
Census	Pop.	Note	%±
1860	206		—
1870	906		339.8%
1880	835		−7.8%
1890	1,215		45.5%
1900	1,684		38.6%
1910	1,607		−4.6%
1920	1,684		4.8%
1930	1,679		−0.3%
1940	1,835		9.3%
1950	2,166		18.0%
1960	2,375		9.6%
1970	2,341		−1.4%
1980	2,370		1.2%
1990	2,262		−4.6%
2000	2,418		6.9%
2010	2,490		3.0%
2020	2,318		−6.9%
U.S. Decennial Census

=== 2020 census ===
As of the 2020 census, Winamac had a population of 2,318. The median age was 40.7 years. 20.8% of residents were under the age of 18 and 18.5% of residents were 65 years of age or older. For every 100 females there were 96.9 males, and for every 100 females age 18 and over there were 91.1 males age 18 and over.

0.0% of residents lived in urban areas, while 100.0% lived in rural areas.

There were 1,028 households in Winamac, of which 28.1% had children under the age of 18 living in them. Of all households, 35.8% were married-couple households, 21.5% were households with a male householder and no spouse or partner present, and 34.3% were households with a female householder and no spouse or partner present. About 37.3% of all households were made up of individuals and 16.4% had someone living alone who was 65 years of age or older.

There were 1,130 housing units, of which 9.0% were vacant. The homeowner vacancy rate was 3.5% and the rental vacancy rate was 9.3%.

Racial composition as of the 2020 census
Race	Number	Percent
White	2,129	91.8%
Black or African American	19	0.8%
American Indian and Alaska Native	9	0.4%
Asian	16	0.7%
Native Hawaiian and Other Pacific Islander	0	0.0%
Some other race	34	1.5%
Two or more races	111	4.8%
Hispanic or Latino (of any race)	81	3.5%

=== 2010 census ===
As of the census of 2010, there were 2,490 people, 1,028 households, and 617 families living in the town. The population density was 1,830.9 inhabitants per square mile (706.9/km^{2}). There were 1,140 housing units at an average density of 838.2 units per square mile (323.6 units/km^{2}). The racial makeup of the town was 97.2% White, 0.5% African American, 0.3% Native American, 0.4% Asian, 0.3% from other races, and 1.2% from two or more races. Hispanic or Latino of any race were 2.3% of the population.

There were 1,028 households, of which 31.3% had children under the age of 18 living with them, 41.8% were married couples living together, 13.1% had a female householder with no husband present, 5.1% had a male householder with no wife present, and 40.0% were non-families. 36.1% of all households were made up of individuals, and 17.3% had someone living alone who was 65 years of age or older. The average household size was 2.29 and the average family size was 2.97.

The median age in the town was 38.8 years. 23.7% of residents were under the age of 18; 9% were between the ages of 18 and 24; 25.2% were from 25 to 44; 25.6% were from 45 to 64; and 16.3% were 65 years of age or older. The gender makeup of the town was 48.8% male and 51.2% female.

=== 2000 census ===
As of the census of 2000, there were 2,418 people, 988 households, and 607 families living in the town. The population density was 1,872.5 inhabitants per square mile (723.0/km^{2}). There were 1,079 housing units at an average density of 835.6 units per square mile (322.6 units/km^{2}). The racial makeup of the town was 97.39% White, 0.70% African American, 0.21% Native American, 0.12% Asian, 0.04% Pacific Islander, 0.17% from other races, and 1.36% from two or more races. Hispanic or Latino of any race were 1.28% of the population.

There were 988 households, out of which 29.5% had children under the age of 18 living with them, 46.8% were married couples living together, 10.9% had a female householder with no husband present, and 38.5% were non-families. 34.9% of all households were made up of individuals, and 19.1% had someone living alone who was 65 years of age or older. The average household size was 2.27 and the average family size was 2.93.

In the town, the population was spread out, with 23.6% under the age of 18, 8.9% from 18 to 24, 26.1% from 25 to 44, 19.6% from 45 to 64, and 21.7% who were 65 years of age or older. The median age was 38 years. For every 100 females, there were 86.4 males. For every 100 females age 18 and over, there were 83.1 males.

The median income for a household in the town was $31,413, and the median income for a family was $43,824. Males had a median income of $29,667 versus $22,461 for females. The per capita income for the town was $16,447. About 5.3% of families and 8.2% of the population were below the poverty line, including 11.9% of those under age 18 and 11.7% of those age 65 or over.

== Education ==
The community is located in the Eastern Pulaski Community School Corporation.

The town has a lending library, the Pulaski County Public Library.

== Economy ==
BraunAbility is based in Winamac.

== Notable people ==
- Ralph Braun, businessman
- John Buchanan, biochemist
- Justin Haley, NASCAR driver
- David E. Lilienthal, lawyer and head of Tennessee Valley Authority and Atomic Energy Commission
- Judith A. Myers, Illinois state senator and educator
- Carl W. Riddick, member of the U.S. House of Representatives from Montana, editor of the Winamac Republican newspaper
