= Union Township, Lawrence County, Pennsylvania =

Township in Pennsylvania, US

Coordinates: 41°01′00″N 80°22′28″W

Union Township
- Township
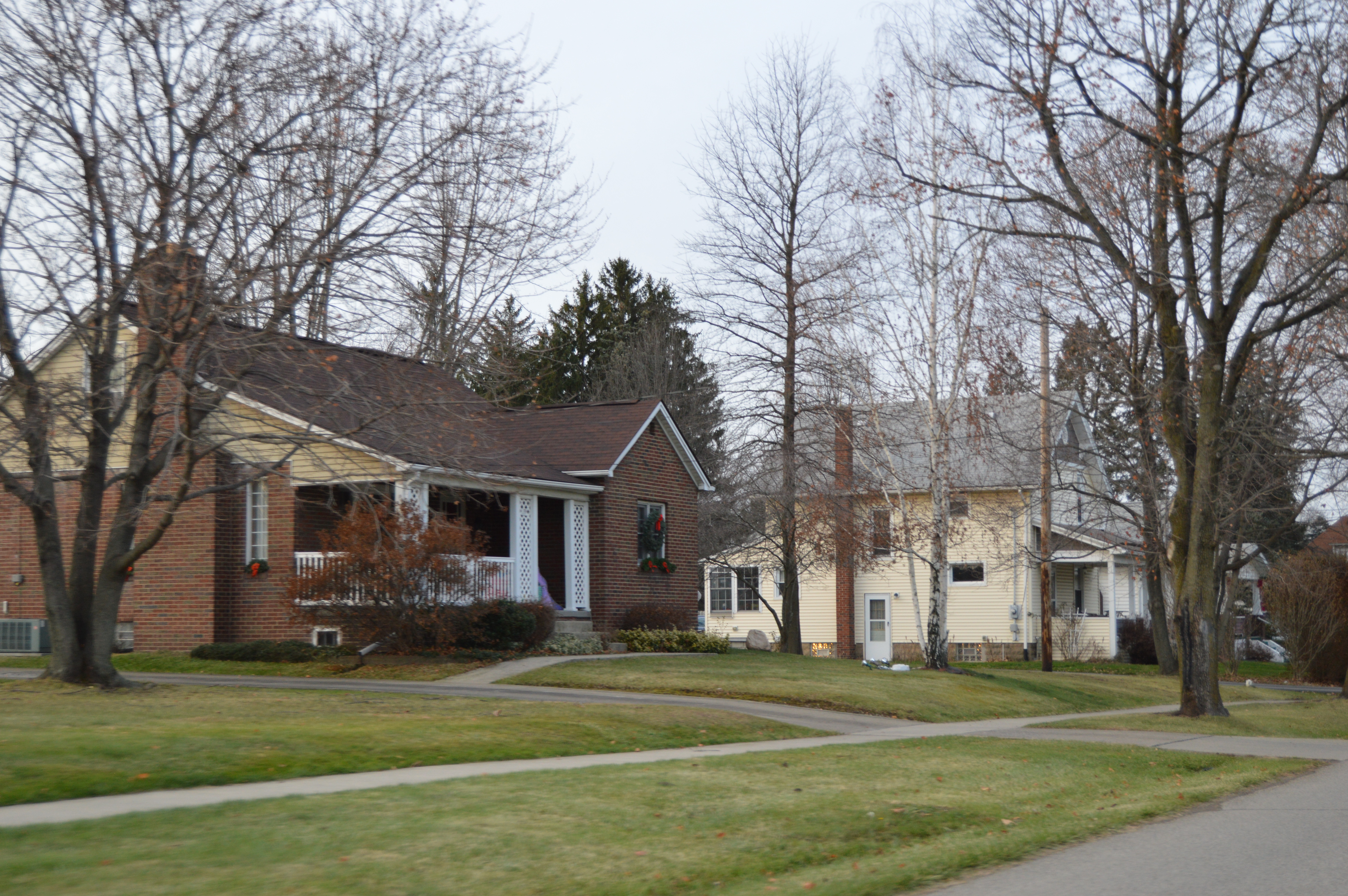
- Houses in Oakwood

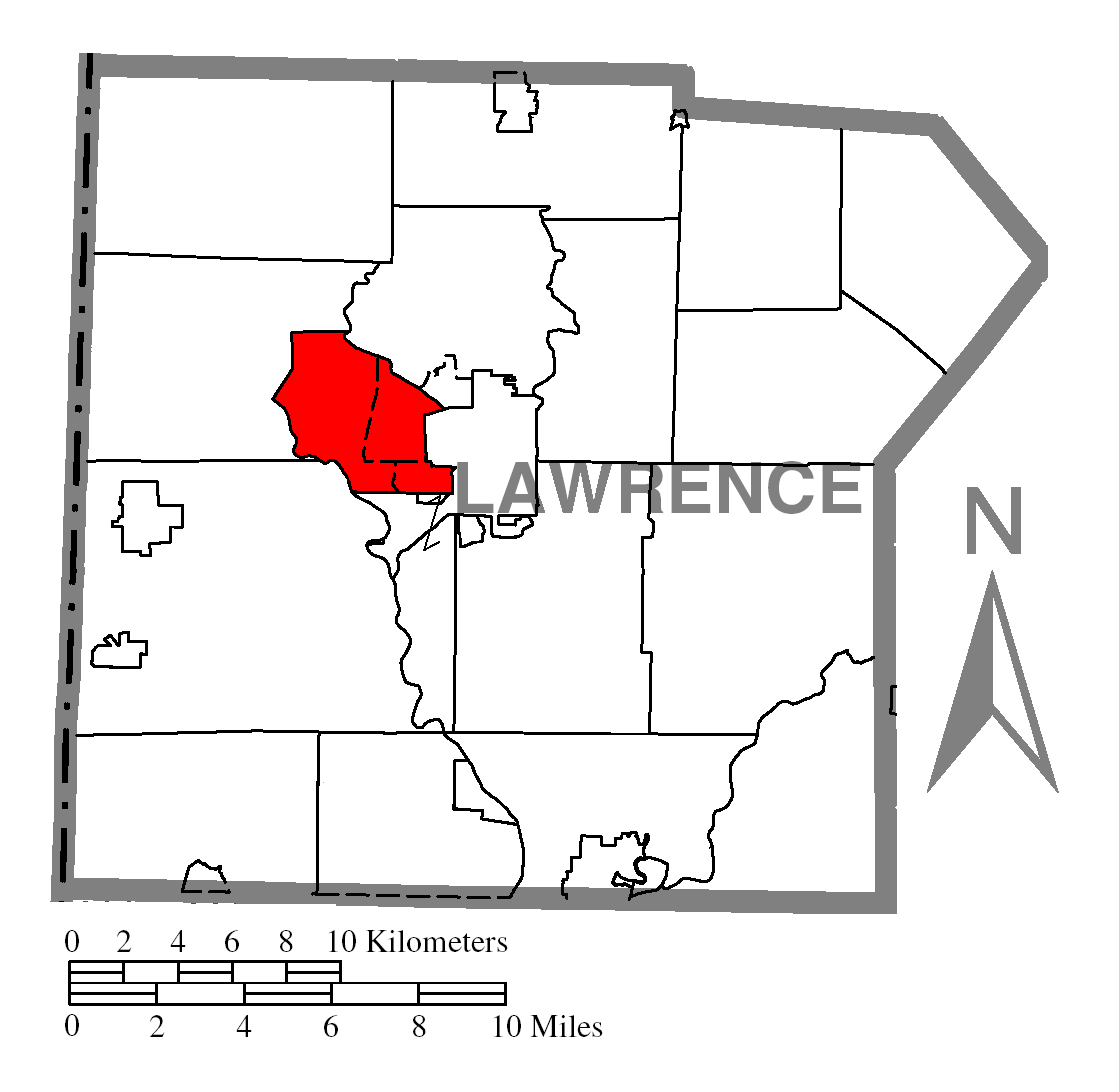
- Location of Union Township in Lawrence County

- Location of Lawrence County in Pennsylvania
- Country: United States
- State: Pennsylvania
- County: Lawrence
- Established: 1859

Area
  - Total: 9.61 sq mi (24.90 km^{2})
  - Land: 9.52 sq mi (24.65 km^{2})
  - Water: 0.097 sq mi (0.25 km^{2})
- Highest elevation (west of US 422): 1,166 ft (355 m)
- Lowest elevation (Mahoning River): 778 ft (237 m)

Population (2020)
  - Total: 4,991
  - Estimate (2022): 4,906
  - Density: 522.3/sq mi (201.68/km^{2})
- Time zone: UTC-4 (EST)
  - Summer (DST): UTC-5 (EDT)
- Area code: 724
- FIPS code: 42-073-78368
- Website: www.uniontownshiplawrencecounty.com

Historical population
Census	Pop.	Note	%±
2000	5,103		—
2010	5,190		1.7%
2020	4,997		−3.7%
2022 (est.)	4,906		−1.8%
U.S. Decennial Census

Union Township is a township in Lawrence County, Pennsylvania, United States. The population was 4,997 at the time of the 2020 census, a decline from the figure of 5,190 as of 2010.

== Geography ==
According to the United States Census Bureau, the township has a total area of 9.7 square miles (25.0 km^{2}), of which 9.6 square miles (24.9 km^{2}) is land and 0.04 square miles (0.1 km^{2}), or 0.41%, is water.

Unincorporated communities in the township include Harbor, Harbor Bridge, Parkstown, Belmar Park, Westview Heights, Oakwood, and Oakland.

== Demographics ==
As of the census of 2000, there were 5,103 people, 2,121 households, and 1,495 families residing in the township.

The population density was 530.3 inhabitants per square mile (204.7/km^{2}). There were 2,227 housing units at an average density of 231.4 per square mile (89.3/km^{2}).

The racial makeup of the township was 94.92% White, 4.06% African American, 0.02% Native American, 0.16% Asian, 0.29% from other races, and 0.55% from two or more races. Hispanic or Latino of any race were 0.53% of the population.

There were 2,121 households, out of which 23.3% had children under the age of 18 living with them; 55.2% were married couples living together, 11.2% had a female householder with no husband present, and 29.5% were non-families. 26.3% of all households were made up of individuals, and 15.1% had someone living alone who was 65 years of age or older.

The average household size was 2.40 and the average family size was 2.89.

In the township the population was spread out, with 18.9% under the age of 18, 6.9% from 18 to 24, 24.3% from 25 to 44, 26.5% from 45 to 64, and 23.5% who were 65 years of age or older. The median age was 45 years.

For every 100 females, there were 91.4 males. For every 100 females who were aged 18 or older, there were 89.0 males.

The median income for a household in the township was $36,074, and the median income for a family was $41,909. Males had a median income of $32,297 compared with that of $21,378 for females.

The per capita income for the township was $16,717.

Roughly 3.9% of families and 5.6% of the population were living below the poverty line, including 5.6% of those who were under the age of 18 and 4.7% of those who were aged 65 or older.

== Education ==
The Union Area School District serves the township.

== Transportation ==
=== Major roads and highways ===
- I-376
- US 224
- US 422
- US 422 Bus.
