= Vurpillat's Opera House =

- U.S. National Register of Historic Places
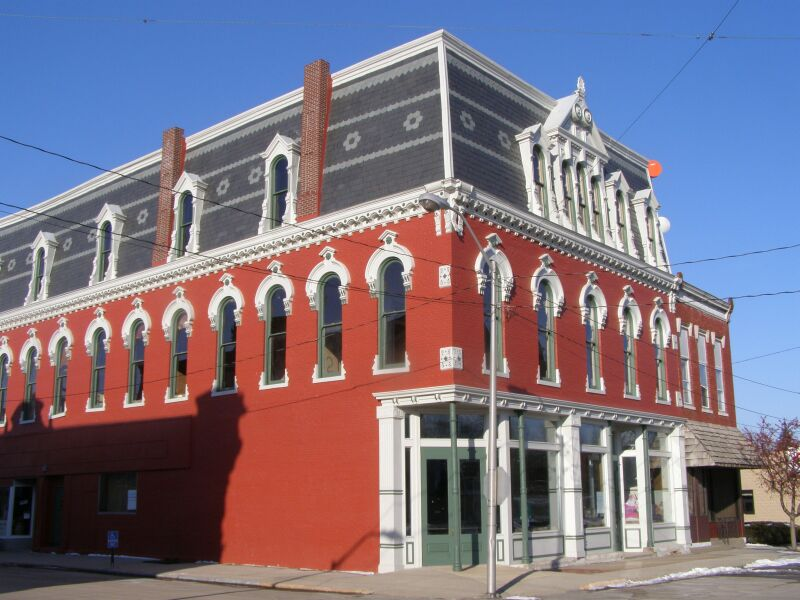
- Vurpillat's Opera House, n.d.

- Location within Indiana Location within the United States
- Location: Jct. of Market and Main Sts., Winamac, Indiana
- Coordinates: 41°3′4″N 86°36′15″W
- Area: less than one acre
- Built: 1883
- Built by: Vurpillat, Frank
- Architect: Rhodes, James
- Architectural style: Second Empire
- NRHP reference No.: 02000201
- Added to NRHP: March 20, 2002

Vurpillat's Opera House is a historic opera house located at Winamac, Indiana. It was built in 1883, and is a three-story, rectangular, Second Empire style brick building with a mansard roof. It sits on a limestone foundation and features metal decorative details.

It was listed on the National Register of Historic Places in 2002.
