= Dr. George W. Thompson House =

Historic house in Indiana, United States

- U.S. National Register of Historic Places
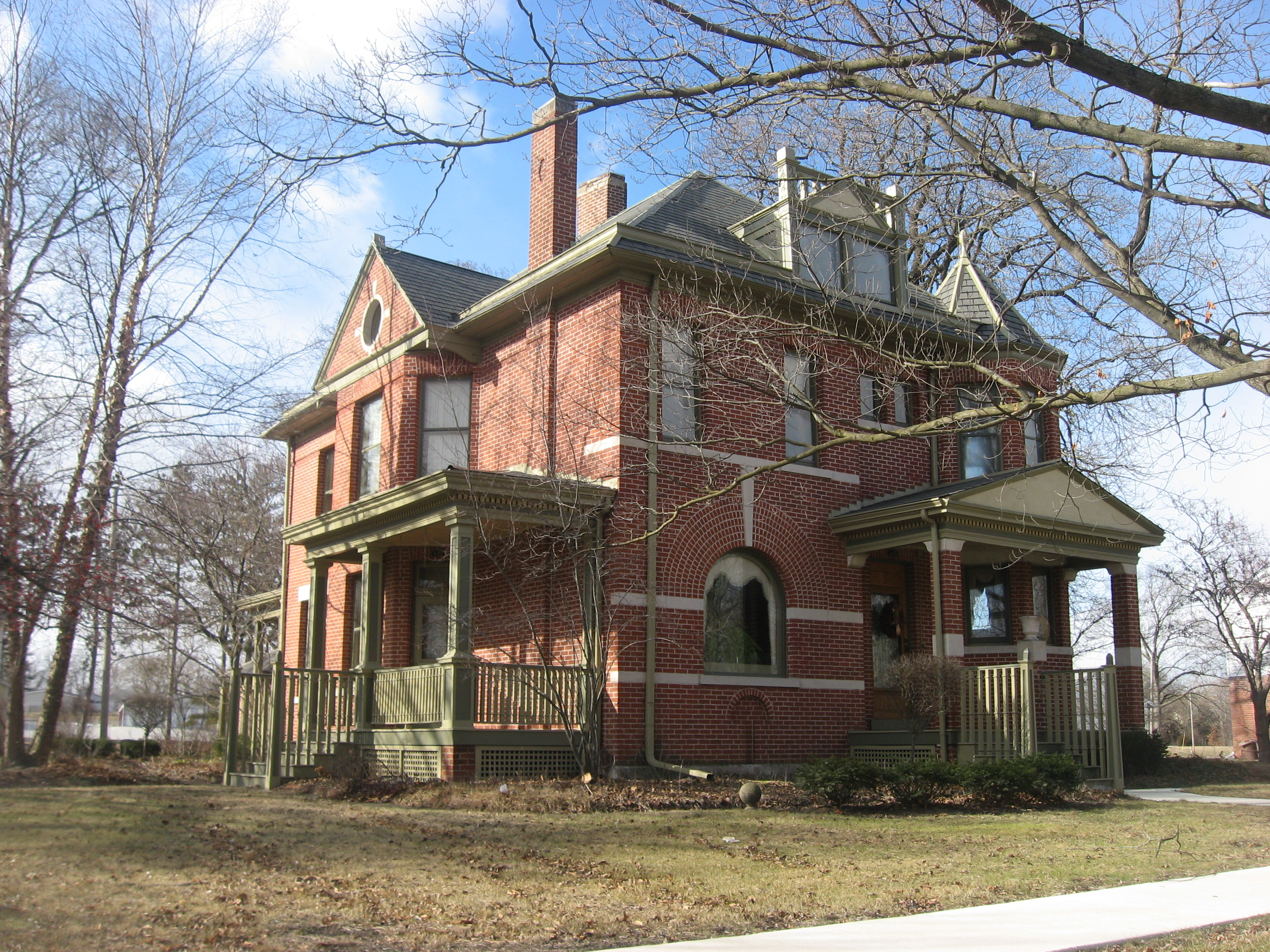
- Dr. George W. Thompson House, January 2013

- Location within Indiana Location within the United States
- Location: 407 N. Market St., Winamac, Indiana
- Coordinates: 41°3′13″N 86°36′22″W
- Area: less than one acre
- Built: 1897
- Architectural style: Colonial Revival, Romanesque
- NRHP reference No.: 84001233
- Added to NRHP: September 27, 1984

Dr. George W. Thompson House is a historic home located at Winamac, Indiana. It was built in 1894–1895, and is a two-story, roughly square, Romanesque Revival style brick dwelling with Colonial Revival design details. It has a hipped roof. It features projecting bays, a conical-roofed octagonal corner turret, and a large round-arched window. Also on the property are the contributing carriage house and pump house.

It was listed on the National Register of Historic Places in 1984.
