= Monterey, Indiana =

- Town
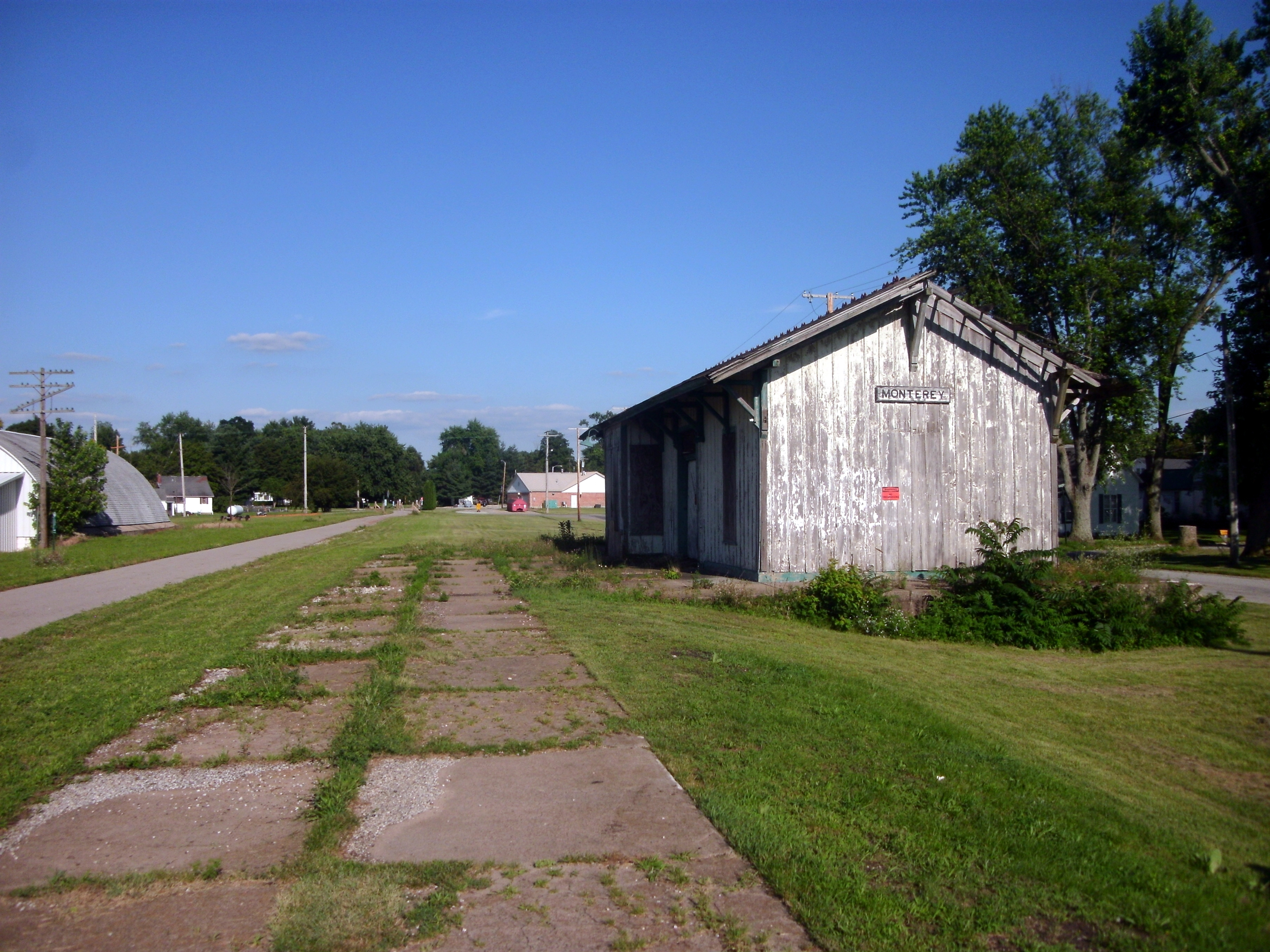
- Former Erie Railroad depot, with platform remnants and old right-of-way yet visible

- Location of Monterey in Pulaski County, Indiana.
- Coordinates: 41°09′22″N 86°28′55″W
- Country: United States
- State: Indiana
- County: Pulaski
- Township: Tippecanoe

Area
  - Total: 0.18 sq mi (0.47 km^{2})
  - Land: 0.18 sq mi (0.47 km^{2})
  - Water: 0 sq mi (0.00 km^{2})
- Elevation: 725 ft (221 m)

Population (2020)
  - Total: 182
  - Density: 994.3/sq mi (383.92/km^{2})
- Time zone: UTC-5 (Eastern Standard Time)
  - Summer (DST): UTC-4 (Eastern Daylight Time)
- ZIP code: 46960
- Area code: 574
- FIPS code: 18-50616
- GNIS feature ID: 2396775

Monterey is a town in Tippecanoe Township, Pulaski County, in the U.S. state of Indiana. The population was 182 at the 2020 census.

== History ==
Monterey was first called Buena Vista, and under the latter name was laid out in 1849. The present name commemorates the Battle of Monterrey. A post office called Monterey has been in operation since 1851.

The Monterey Bandstand was listed on the National Register of Historic Places in 2012.

== Geography ==
Monterey is located along the Tippecanoe River.

According to the 2010 census, Monterey has a total area of 0.18 square miles (0.47 km^{2}), all land.

== Demographics ==
Historical population
| Census | Pop. | Note | %± |
|---|---|---|---|
| 1870 | 210 | | — |
| 1880 | 144 | | −31.4% |
| 1890 | 226 | | 56.9% |
| 1900 | 261 | | 15.5% |
| 1910 | 260 | | −0.4% |
| 1920 | 304 | | 16.9% |
| 1930 | 283 | | −6.9% |
| 1940 | 288 | | 1.8% |
| 1950 | 250 | | −13.2% |
| 1960 | 278 | | 11.2% |
| 1970 | 268 | | −3.6% |
| 1980 | 236 | | −11.9% |
| 1990 | 230 | | −2.5% |
| 2000 | 231 | | 0.4% |
| 2010 | 218 | | −5.6% |
| 2020 | 182 | | −16.5% |
U.S. Decennial Census

=== 2010 census ===
As of the census of 2010, there were 218 people, 85 households, and 51 families residing in the town. The population density was 1,211.1 inhabitants per square mile (467.6/km^{2}). There were 101 housing units at an average density of 561.1 per square mile (216.6/km^{2}). The racial makeup of the town was 97.7% White, 0.5% African American, 0.5% Native American, and 1.4% from two or more races. Hispanic or Latino of any race were 9.6% of the population.

There were 85 households, of which 36.5% had children under the age of 18 living with them, 45.9% were married couples living together, 8.2% had a female householder with no husband present, 5.9% had a male householder with no wife present, and 40.0% were non-families. 35.3% of all households were made up of individuals, and 20% had someone living alone who was 65 years of age or older. The average household size was 2.56 and the average family size was 3.24.

The median age in the town was 35 years. 31.7% of residents were under the age of 18; 4.1% were between the ages of 18 and 24; 25.7% were from 25 to 44; 23.8% were from 45 to 64; and 14.7% were 65 years of age or older. The gender makeup of the town was 52.3% male and 47.7% female.

=== 2000 census ===
As of the census of 2000, there were 231 people, 90 households, and 60 families residing in the town. The population density was 1,353.5 inhabitants per square mile (522.6/km^{2}). There were 103 housing units at an average density of 603.5 per square mile (233.0/km^{2}). The racial makeup of the town was 94.81% White, 3.03% African American, 0.87% Asian, and 1.30% from two or more races.

There were 90 households, out of which 30.0% had children under the age of 18 living with them, 57.8% were married couples living together, 4.4% had a female householder with no husband present, and 33.3% were non-families. 26.7% of all households were made up of individuals, and 10.0% had someone living alone who was 65 years of age or older. The average household size was 2.57 and the average family size was 3.12.

In the town, the population was spread out, with 27.3% under the age of 18, 9.1% from 18 to 24, 22.5% from 25 to 44, 23.8% from 45 to 64, and 17.3% who were 65 years of age or older. The median age was 36 years. For every 100 females there were 104.4 males. For every 100 females age 18 and over, there were 104.9 males.

The median income for a household in the town was $24,779, and the median income for a family was $33,750. Males had a median income of $24,167 versus $18,182 for females. The per capita income for the town was $14,479. About 6.3% of families and 14.5% of the population were below the poverty line, including 16.4% of those under the age of eighteen and 22.9% of those 65 or over.

== Education ==
The town has a lending library, the Monterey-Tippecanoe Township Public Library.
