= Francesville, Indiana =

- Town
- Town of Francesville
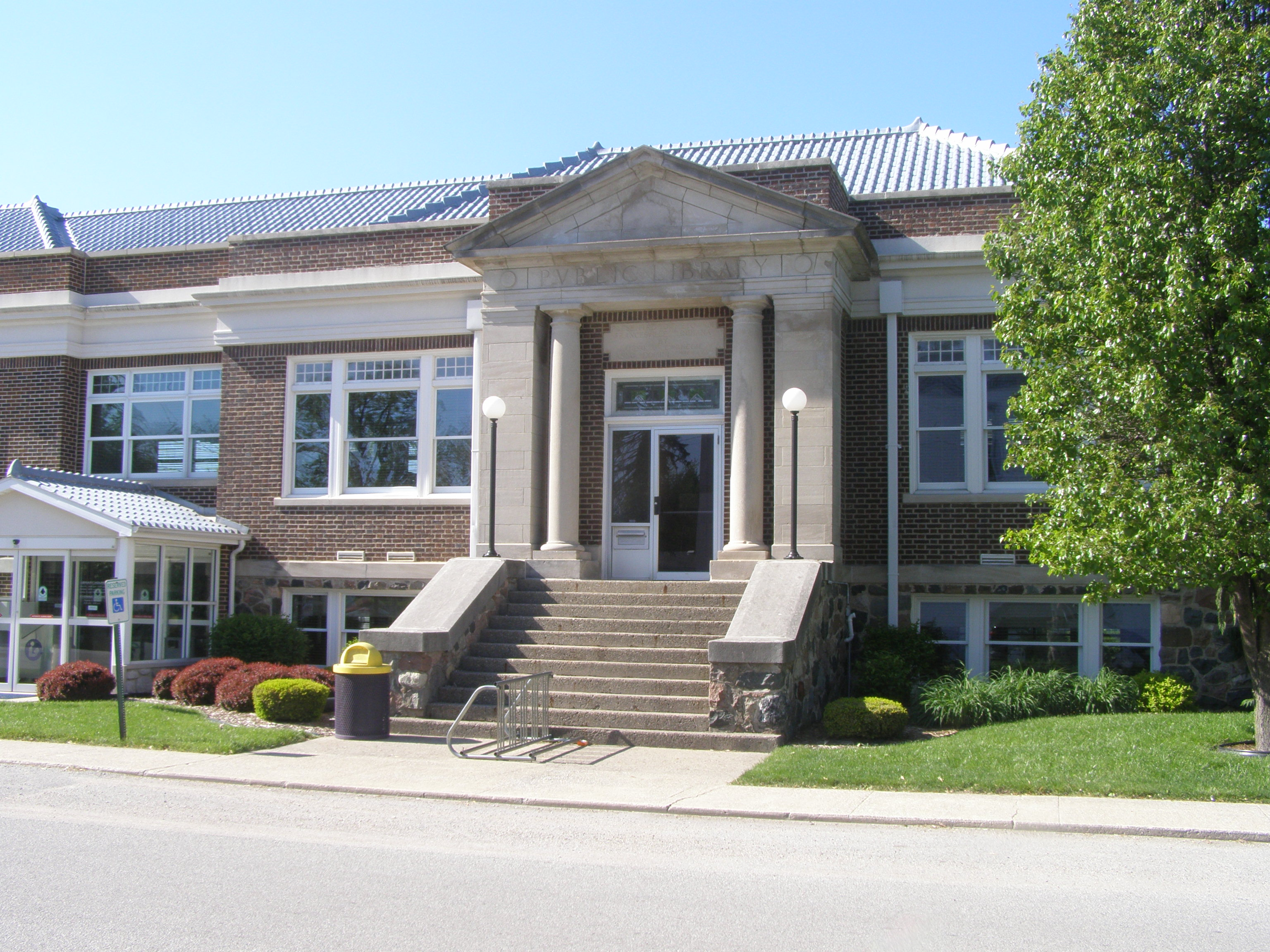
- Francesville Library

- Location of Francesville in Pulaski County, Indiana.
- Coordinates: 40°59′07″N 86°53′01″W
- Country: United States
- State: Indiana
- County: Pulaski
- Township: Salem

Area
  - Total: 0.31 sq mi (0.79 km^{2})
  - Land: 0.31 sq mi (0.79 km^{2})
  - Water: 0 sq mi (0.00 km^{2})
- Elevation: 682 ft (208 m)

Population (2020)
  - Total: 852
  - Density: 2,806.5/sq mi (1,083.59/km^{2})
- Time zone: UTC-5 (EST)
  - Summer (DST): UTC-5 (EST)
- ZIP code: 47946
- Area code: 219
- FIPS code: 18-25288
- GNIS feature ID: 2396947
- Website: www.francesville.net

Francesville is a town in Salem Township, Pulaski County, in the U.S. state of Indiana. The population was 852 at the 2020 census. The motto for Francesville is “A small town with a big heart.”

== History ==
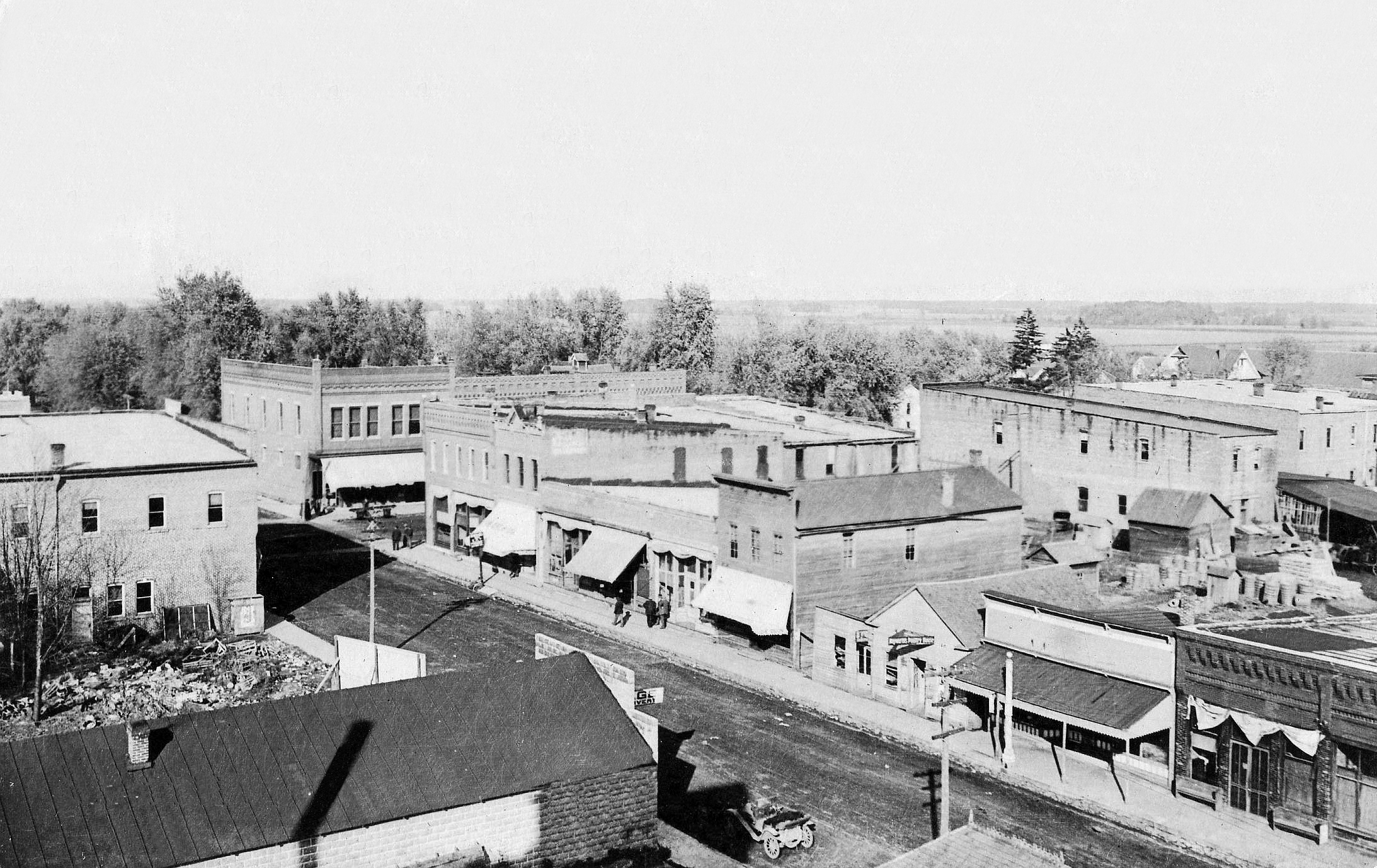
Francesville, 1912)

Francesville was founded in 1853 when the railroad was extended to that point. The town was named for Frances Brooks, the daughter of a railroad official. A post office has been in operation at Francesville since 1853.

Mallon Building was listed on the National Register of Historic Places in 1999.

== Geography ==
According to the 2010 census, Francesville has a total area of 0.3 square miles (0.78 km^{2}), all land.

=== Climate ===
Climate data for Francesville, Indiana (1991–2020)
Month	Jan	Feb	Mar	Apr	May	Jun	Jul	Aug	Sep	Oct	Nov	Dec	Year
Mean daily maximum °F (°C)	31.5 (−0.3)	36.0 (2.2)	47.3 (8.5)	60.3 (15.7)	71.5 (21.9)	80.2 (26.8)	83.0 (28.3)	81.4 (27.4)	76.6 (24.8)	63.8 (17.7)	48.9 (9.4)	36.7 (2.6)	59.8 (15.4)
Daily mean °F (°C)	23.5 (−4.7)	27.2 (−2.7)	37.5 (3.1)	49.2 (9.6)	60.6 (15.9)	69.7 (20.9)	72.6 (22.6)	70.9 (21.6)	64.5 (18.1)	52.5 (11.4)	39.8 (4.3)	29.1 (−1.6)	49.8 (9.9)
Mean daily minimum °F (°C)	15.5 (−9.2)	18.4 (−7.6)	27.7 (−2.4)	38.0 (3.3)	49.7 (9.8)	59.3 (15.2)	62.2 (16.8)	60.3 (15.7)	52.5 (11.4)	41.2 (5.1)	30.7 (−0.7)	21.5 (−5.8)	39.8 (4.3)
Average precipitation inches (mm)	2.33 (59)	1.96 (50)	2.50 (64)	3.68 (93)	3.91 (99)	4.33 (110)	4.90 (124)	4.17 (106)	3.17 (81)	3.14 (80)	2.62 (67)	2.16 (55)	38.87 (988)
Average snowfall inches (cm)	8.9 (23)	7.4 (19)	3.3 (8.4)	0.4 (1.0)	0.0 (0.0)	0.0 (0.0)	0.0 (0.0)	0.0 (0.0)	0.0 (0.0)	0.0 (0.0)	0.9 (2.3)	5.4 (14)	26.3 (67.7)
Source: NOAA

== Demographics ==
Historical population
Census	Pop.	Note	%±
1860	189		—
1870	281		48.7%
1880	368		31.0%
1890	403		9.5%
1900	596		47.9%
1910	729		22.3%
1920	648		−11.1%
1930	712		9.9%
1940	804		12.9%
1950	856		6.5%
1960	1,002		17.1%
1970	1,015		1.3%
1980	944		−7.0%
1990	969		2.6%
2000	905		−6.6%
2010	879		−2.9%
2020	852		−3.1%
U.S. Decennial Census

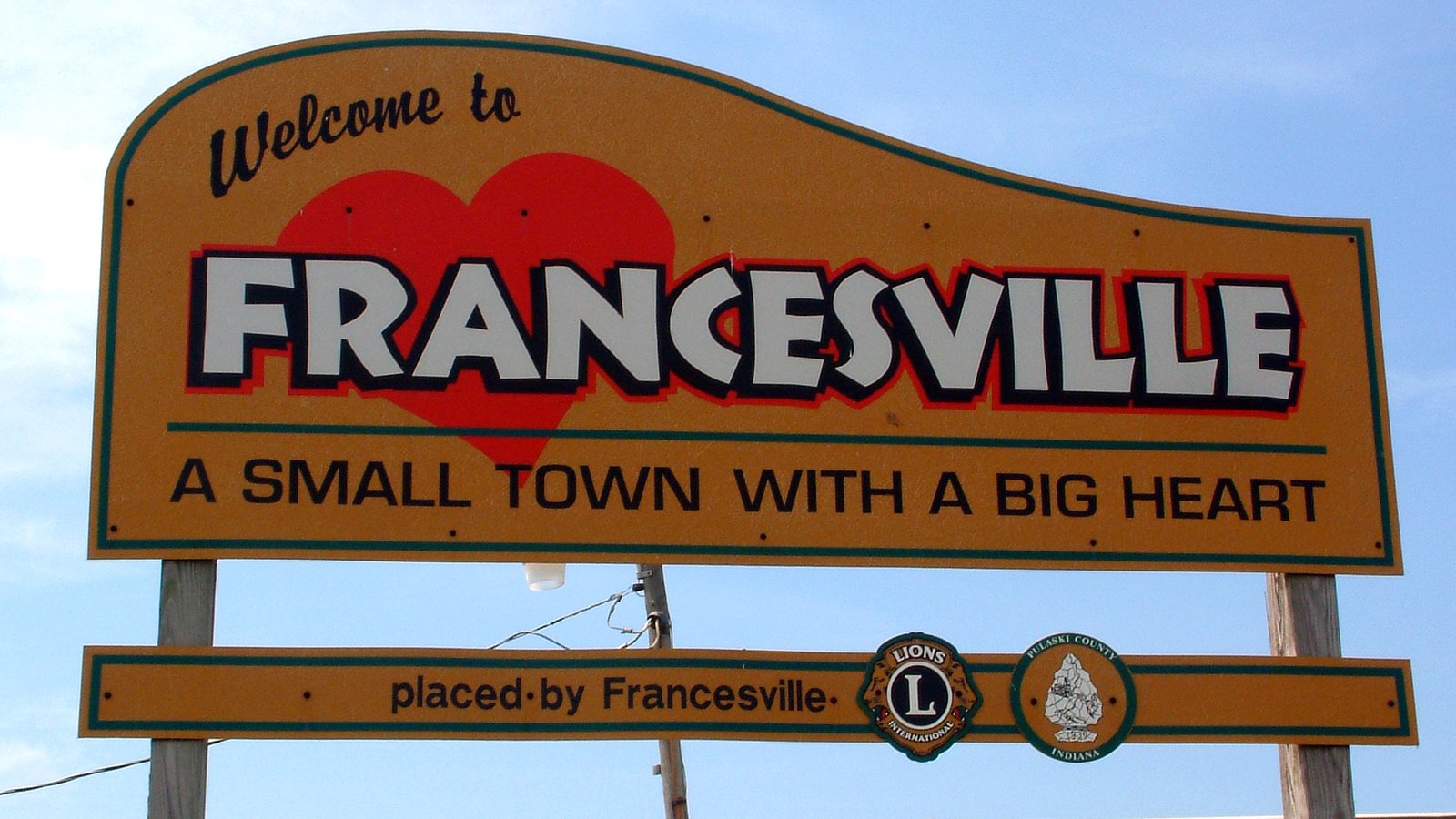
Welcome sign

=== 2010 census ===
As of the census of 2010, there were 879 people, 353 households, and 259 families living in the town. The population density was 2,930.0 inhabitants per square mile (1,131.3/km^{2}). There were 384 housing units at an average density of 1,280.0 per square mile (494.2/km^{2}). The racial makeup of the town was 97.0% White, 0.2% African American, 0.7% Native American, 0.1% Asian, 0.3% from other races, and 1.6% from two or more races. Hispanic or Latino of any race were 3.6% of the population.

There were 353 households, of which 33.1% had children under the age of 18 living with them, 56.9% were married couples living together, 11.9% had a female householder with no husband present, 4.5% had a male householder with no wife present, and 26.6% were non-families. 24.6% of all households were made up of individuals, and 12.5% had someone living alone who was 65 years of age or older. The average household size was 2.49 and the average family size was 2.91.

The median age in the town was 39.6 years. 26.1% of residents were under the age of 18; 7% were between the ages of 18 and 24; 23.6% were from 25 to 44; 27% were from 45 to 64; and 16.4% were 65 years of age or older. The gender makeup of the town was 49.3% male and 50.7% female.

=== 2000 census ===
As of the census of 2000, there were 905 people, 357 households, and 252 families living in the town. The population density was 2,954.7 inhabitants per square mile (1,140.8/km^{2}). There were 383 housing units at an average density of 1,250.4 per square mile (482.8/km^{2}). The racial makeup of the town was 97.68% White, 0.11% African American, 0.22% Asian, 0.33% from other races, and 1.66% from two or more races. Hispanic or Latino of any race were 1.33% of the population.

There were 357 households, out of which 33.9% had children under the age of 18 living with them, 59.7% were married couples living together, 7.8% had a female householder with no husband present, and 29.4% were non-families. 26.3% of all households were made up of individuals, and 13.4% had someone living alone who was 65 years of age or older. The average household size was 2.54 and the average family size was 3.09.

In the town, the population was spread out, with 27.5% under the age of 18, 6.6% from 18 to 24, 27.4% from 25 to 44, 20.4% from 45 to 64, and 18.0% who were 65 years of age or older. The median age was 37 years. For every 100 females, there were 94.6 males. For every 100 females age 18 and over, there were 91.3 males.

The median income for a household in the town was $39,464, and the median income for a family was $43,438. Males had a median income of $30,000 versus $20,341 for females. The per capita income for the town was $16,469. About 3.3% of families and 4.2% of the population were below the poverty line, including 2.2% of those under age 18 and 2.8% of those age 65 or over.

== Education ==
The town has a lending library, the Francesville-Salem Township Public Library.

The K-12 students attend the West Central School Corporation, which serves the western half of Pulaski County and Gillam Township in adjacent Jasper County.
