= List of high schools in Indiana =

This is a list of high schools in the U.S. state of Indiana.

== A ==
=== Adams County ===
School	City/town	Website	Enrollment (2024–25)	Grades	Mascot	School colors	Conference
Adams Central Middle/High School	Monroe	Website	412	9–12	Flying Jets		Allen County
Bellmont High School	Decatur	Website	613	9–12	Braves		Northeast Eight
South Adams High School	Berne	Website	347	9–12	Starfires		Allen County

=== Allen County ===
School	City/town	Website	Enrollment (2024–25)	Grades	Mascot	School colors	Conference
Bishop Dwenger High School	Fort Wayne	Website	917 (2023-24)	9–12	Saints		Summit
Bishop Luers High School	Fort Wayne	Website	553	9–12	Knights		Summit
Blackhawk Christian School	Fort Wayne	Website	947 (2023-24)	K–12	Braves		Independent
Canterbury High School	Fort Wayne	Website	796 (2023-24)	PS-12	Cavaliers		Independent
Carroll High School	Fort Wayne	Website	2,623	9–12	Chargers		Summit
Concordia Lutheran High School	Fort Wayne	Website	727 (2023-24)	9–12	Cadets		Summit
East Allen University	Fort Wayne	Website	291	9–12	Bluejays		Independent
Heritage Junior/Senior High School	Monroeville	Website	748	7–12	Patriots		Allen County
Homestead High School	Fort Wayne	Website	2,382	9–12	Spartans		Summit
Leo High School	Leo-Cedarville	Website	1,328	9–12	Lions		Northeast Eight
New Haven High School	New Haven	Website	1,413	7-12	Bulldogs		Northeast Eight
North Side High School	Fort Wayne	Website	1,460	9–12	Legends		Summit
Northrop High School	Fort Wayne	Website	2,145	9–12	Bruins		Summit
R. Nelson Snider High School	Fort Wayne	Website	1,927	9–12	Panthers		Summit
South Side High School	Fort Wayne	Website	1,405	9–12	Archers		Summit
Wayne High School	Fort Wayne	Website	1,398	9–12	Generals		Summit
Woodlan Junior/Senior High School	Woodburn	Website	743	7–12	Warriors		Allen County

== B ==
=== Bartholomew County ===
School	City/town	Website	Enrollment (2023–24)	Grades	Mascot	School colors	Conference
Columbus Christian School	Columbus	Website	423	PreK–12	Crusaders		Southern Roads
Columbus East High School	Columbus	Website	1,518	9–12	Olympians		Hoosier Hills
Columbus North High School	Columbus	Website	2,267	9–12	Bull Dogs		Conference Indiana
Hauser Junior-Senior High School	Hope	Website	417	7–12	Jets		Mid-Hoosier

=== Benton County ===
School	City/town	Website	Enrollment (2023–24)	Grades	Mascot	School colors	Conference
Benton Central Junior-Senior High School	Atkinson (Oxford address)	Website	790	7–12	Bison		Hoosier Athletic

=== Blackford County ===
School	City/town	Website	Enrollment (2023–24)	Grades	Mascot	School colors	Conference
Blackford High School	Hartford City	Website	715	9–12	Bruins		Central Indiana

=== Boone County ===
School	City/town	Website	Enrollment (2023–24)	Grades	Mascot	School colors	Conference
Lebanon Senior High School	Lebanon	Website	1,038	9–12	Tigers		Sagamore
Traders Point Christian Schools	Whitestown	Website	112	9–12	Knights		Independent
Western Boone Junior-Senior High School	Thorntown	Website	774	7–12	Stars		Monon Athletic
Zionsville Community High School	Zionsville	Website	2,319	9–12	Eagles		Hoosier Crossroads

=== Brown County ===
School	City/town	Website	Enrollment (2023–24)	Grades	Mascot	School colors	Conference
Brown County High School	Nashville	Website	488	9–12	Eagles		Western Indiana

== C ==
=== Carroll County ===
School	City/town	Website	Enrollment (2023–24)	Grades	Mascot	School colors	Conference
Carroll High School	Flora	Website	321	7–12	Cougars		Hoosier Heartland
Delphi Community High School	Delphi	Website	417	9–12	Oracles		Hoosier Heartland

=== Cass County ===
School	City/town	Website	Enrollment (2023–24)	Grades	Mascot	School colors	Conference
Lewis Cass Jr./Sr. High School	Walton	Website	389	9–12	Kings		Three Rivers
Logansport Community High School	Logansport	Website	1,235	9–12	Berries		Hoosier Athletic
Pioneer Jr./Sr. High School	Royal Center	Website	432	7–12	Panthers		Hoosier North

=== Clark County ===
School	City/town	Website	Enrollment (2023–24)	Grades	Mascot	School colors	Conference
Borden Jr/Sr High School	Borden	Website	317	7–12	Braves		Southern
Charlestown High School	Charlestown	Website	854	9–12	Pirates		Mid-Southern
Clarksville High School	Clarksville	Website	385	9–12	Generals		Mid-Southern
Henryville Jr./Sr. High School	Henryville	Website	459	7–12	Hornets		Southern
Jeffersonville High School	Jeffersonville	Website	2,141	9–12	Red Devils		Hoosier Hills
New Washington Middle/High School	New Washington	Website	335	6–12	Mustangs		Southern
Our Lady of Providence High School	Clarksville	Website	371	9–12	Pioneers		Independent
Rock Creek Community Academy	Sellersburg	Website	125	9–12	Lions		Independent
Silver Creek High School	Sellersburg	Website	943	9–12	Dragons		Mid-Southern

=== Clay County ===
School	City/town	Website	Enrollment (2023–24)	Grades	Mascot	School colors	Conference
Clay City Junior-Senior High School	Clay City	Website	350	7–12	Eels		Southwestern Indiana
Northview High School	Brazil	Website	894	9–12	Knights		Western Indiana

=== Clinton County ===
School	City/town	Website	Enrollment (2023–24)	Grades	Mascot	School colors	Conference
Clinton Central High School	Michigantown	Website	389	7–12	Bulldogs		Hoosier Heartland
Clinton Prairie Junior-Senior High School	Frankfort	Website	469	7–12	Gophers		Hoosier Heartland
Frankfort High School	Frankfort	Website	901	9–12	Hot Dogs		Monon Athletic
Rossville Jr/Sr High School	Rossville	Website	473	6–12	Hornets		Hoosier Heartland

=== Crawford County ===
School	City/town	Website	Enrollment (2023–24)	Grades	Mascot	School colors	Conference
Crawford County High School	Marengo	Website	379	9–12	Wolfpack		Patoka Lake

== D ==
=== Daviess County ===
School	City/town	Website	Enrollment (2023–24)	Grades	Mascot	School colors	Conference
Barr-Reeve Middle/High School	Montgomery	Website	500	6–12	Vikings		Blue Chip
North Daviess Junior-Senior High School	Elnora	Website	457	7–12	Cougars		Southwestern Indiana
Washington Catholic Middle/High School	Washington	Website	119	6–12	Cardinals		Blue Chip
Washington High School	Washington	Website	813	9–12	Hatchets		Pocket Athletic

=== Dearborn County ===
School	City/town	Website	Enrollment (2023–24)	Grades	Mascot	School colors	Conference
East Central High School	Saint Leon	Website	1,246	9–12	Trojans		Eastern Indiana
Lawrenceburg High School	Lawrenceburg	Website	728	9–12	Tigers		Eastern Indiana
South Dearborn High School	Aurora	Website	645	9–12	Knights		Eastern Indiana

=== Decatur County ===
School	City/town	Website	Enrollment (2023–24)	Grades	Mascot	School colors	Conference
Greensburg Community High School	Greensburg	Website	662	9–12	Pirates		Eastern Indiana
North Decatur Junior-Senior High School	Greensburg	Website	460	7–12	Chargers		Mid-Hoosier/Mid-Indiana (football only)
South Decatur Junior-Senior High School	Westport	Website	392	7–12	Cougars		Mid-Hoosier/Mid-Indiana (football only)

=== DeKalb County ===
School	City/town	Website	Enrollment (2023–24)	Grades	Mascot	School colors	Conference	FB	BA,BB,VB	SC
DeKalb High School	Waterloo	Website	1,052	9–12	Barons		Northeast Eight	4A	4A	2A
Eastside Junior-Senior High School	Butler	Website	564	7–12	Blazers		Northeast Corner	2A	2A	2A
Garrett High School	Garrett	Website	558	9–12	Railroaders		Northeast Corner	3A	3A	1A

=== Delaware County ===
School	City/town	Website	Enrollment (2023–24)	Grades	Mascot	School colors	Conference	FB	BA,BB,VB	SC
Burris Laboratory School	Muncie	Website	668	K–12	Owls		Pioneer	N/A	2A	1A
Cowan Jr/Sr High School	Cowan	Website	350	7–12	Blackhawks		Mid-Eastern	N/A	1A	N/A
Daleville Junior/Senior High School	Daleville	Website	447	7–12	Broncos		Mid-Eastern	N/A	1A	N/A
Delta High School	Muncie	Website	800	9–12	Eagles		Hoosier Heritage	4A	3A	2A
Indiana Academy for Science, Mathematics, and Humanities	Muncie	Website	209	10–12	Owls		Independent	N/A	1A	1A
Muncie Central High School	Muncie	Website	1,348	9–12	Bearcats		North Central	4A	3A	2A
Wapahani High School	Selma	Website	334	9–12	Raiders		Mid-Eastern	N/A	2A	1A
Wes-Del Middle/High School	Gaston	Website	451	6–12	Warriors		Mid-Eastern	1A	1A	N/A
Yorktown High School	Yorktown	Website	815	9–12	Tigers		Hoosier Heritage	3A	3A	2A

=== Dubois County ===
School	City/town	Website	Enrollment (2023–24)	Grades	Mascot	School colors	Conference	FB	BA,BB,VB	SC
Forest Park Junior-Senior High School	Ferdinand	Website	521	7–12	Rangers		Pocket	2A	2A	1A
Jasper High School	Jasper	Website	1,100	9–12	Wildcats		Big Eight	4A	3A	2A
Northeast Dubois Jr/Sr High School	Dubois	Website	373	7–12	Jeeps		Blue Chip	N/A	1A	1A
Southridge High School	Huntingburg	Website	580	9–12	Raiders		Pocket	2A	3A	N/A

== E ==
=== Elkhart County ===
School	City/town	Website	Enrollment (2023–24)	Grades	Mascot	School colors	Conference
Bethany Christian High School	Goshen	Website	130	9–12	Bruins		Hoosier Plains
Concord High School	Elkhart	Website	1,735	9–12	Minuteman		Northern Lakes
Elkhart Christian Academy	Elkhart	Website	185	9–12	Eagles		Independent
Fairfield Junior-Senior High School	Goshen	Website	875	7–12	Falcons		Northeast Corner
Goshen High School	Goshen	Website	2,041	9–12	Redhawks		Northern Lakes
Jimtown High School	Elkhart	Website	538	9–12	Jimmies		Northern Indiana
Northridge High School	Middlebury	Website	1,396	9–12	Raiders		Northern Lakes
NorthWood High School	Nappanee	Website	875	9–12	Panthers		Northern Lakes
Elkhart High School	Elkhart	Website	3,195	9-12	Lions		Northern Indiana

== F ==
=== Fayette County ===
School	City/town	Website	Enrollment (2023–24)	Grades	Mascot	School colors	Conference
Connersville High School	Connersville	Website	930	9–12	Spartans		Eastern Indiana

=== Floyd County ===
School	City/town	Website	Enrollment (2023–24)	Grades	Mascot	School colors	Conference
Christian Academy of Indiana	New Albany	Website	1,074	Pre-K–12	Warriors		Independent
Floyd Central High School	Floyds Knobs	Website	1,823	9–12	Highlanders		Hoosier Hills
New Albany High School	New Albany	Website	1,814	9–12	Bulldogs		Hoosier Hills

=== Fountain County ===
School	City/town	Website	Enrollment (2023–24)	Grades	Mascot	School colors	Conference
Attica Junior-Senior High School	Attica	Website	275	6–12	Red Ramblers		Wabash River
Covington High School	Covington	Website	281	9–12	Trojans		Wabash River
Fountain Central Junior/Senior High School	Veedersburg	Website	508	6–12	Mustangs		Wabash River

=== Franklin County ===
School	City/town	Website	Enrollment (2023–24)	Grades	Mascot	School colors	Conference
Franklin County High School	Brookville	Website	650	9–12	Wildcats		Eastern Indiana
Oldenburg Academy	Oldenburg	Website	228	9–12	Twisters		Independent

=== Fulton County ===
School	City/town	Website	Enrollment (2023–24)	Grades	Mascot	School colors	Conference
Caston Jr./Sr. High School	Fulton	Website	434	7–12	Comets		Hoosier North
Rochester High School	Rochester	Website	201	9–12	Zebras		Three Rivers

== G ==
=== Gibson County ===
School	City/town	Website	Enrollment (2023–24)	Grades	Mascot	School colors	Conference
Gibson Southern High School	Fort Branch	Website	771	9–12	Titans		Pocket Athletic
Princeton Community High School	Princeton	Website	600	9–12	Tigers		Pocket Athletic
Waldo J. Wood Memorial High School	Oakland City	Website	200	9–12	Trojans		Blue Chip

=== Grant County ===
School	City/town	Website	Enrollment (2023–24)	Grades	Mascot	School colors	Conference
Eastbrook High School	Marion	Website	506	9–12	Panthers		Central Indiana
The King's Academy	Jonesboro	Website	160	K–12	Knights		Independent
Lakeview Christian School	Marion	Website	177	K–12	Lions		Independent
Madison-Grant Jr./Sr. High School	Fairmount	Website	504	7–12	Argylls		Central Indiana
Marion High School	Marion	Website	1,052	9–12	Giants		North Central
Mississinewa High School	Gas City	Website	790	9–12	Indians		Central Indiana
Oak Hill High School	Converse	Website	543	9–12	Golden Eagles		Central Indiana

* Oak Hill High School is located in Grant County, though its mailing address is in Converse, which is in Miami County.

=== Greene County ===
School	City/town	Website	Enrollment (2023–24)	Grades	Mascot	School colors	Conference
Bloomfield Middle and High School	Bloomfield	Website	220	6–12	Cardinals		Southwestern Indiana
Eastern Greene High School	Bloomfield	Website	351	9–12	Thunderbirds		Southwestern Indiana
Linton-Stockton High School	Linton	Website	387	9–12	Miners		Southwestern Indiana
Shakamak Junior-Senior High School	Jasonville	Website	306	7–12	Lakers		Southwestern Indiana
White River Valley High School	Switz City	Website	209	9–12	Wolverines		Southwestern Indiana

== H ==
=== Hamilton County ===
School	City/town	Website	Enrollment (2023–24)	Grades	Mascot	School colors	Conference
Carmel High School	Carmel	Website	5,200	9–12	Greyhound		Independent
Fishers High School	Fishers	Website	3,664	9–12	Tigers		Hoosier Crossroads
Hamilton Heights High School	Arcadia	Website	687	9–12	Huskies		Hoosier Athletic
Hamilton Southeastern High School	Fishers	Website	3,445	9–12	Royals		Hoosier Crossroads
Indiana Academy (SDA High School)	Cicero	Website	129	9–12			Independent
Noblesville High School	Noblesville	Website	3,227	9–12	Millers		Hoosier Crossroads
St. Theodore Guerin High School	Noblesville	Website	797	9–12	Golden Eagles		Circle City
Sheridan High School	Sheridan	Website	336	9–12	Blackhawks		Hoosier Heartland
University High School	Carmel	Website	360	9–12	Trailblazers		Pioneer Conference
Westfield High School	Westfield	Website	2,960	9–12	Shamrocks		Hoosier Crossroads

=== Hancock County ===
School	City/town	Website	Enrollment (2023–24)	Grades	Mascot	School colors	Conference
Eastern Hancock High School	Charlottesville	Website	378	9–12	Royals		Mid Eastern
Greenfield-Central High School	Greenfield	Website	1,430	9–12	Cougars		Hoosier Heritage
Mount Vernon High School	Fortville	Website	1,455	9–12	Marauders		Hoosier Heritage
New Palestine High School	New Palestine	Website	1,217	9–12	Dragon		Hoosier Heritage

=== Harrison County ===
School	City/town	Website	Enrollment (2023–24)	Grades	Mascot	School colors	Conference
Corydon Central High School	Corydon	Website	754	9–12	Panthers		Mid-Southern
Lanesville Jr/Sr High School	Lanesville	Website	313	7–12	Eagles		Southern
North Harrison High School	Ramsey	Website	630	9–12	Cougars		Mid-Southern
South Central Jr-Sr High School	Elizabeth	Website	269	7–12	Rebels		Southern

=== Hendricks County ===
School	City/t	Website	Enrollment (2023–24)	Grades	Mascot	School colors	Conference
Avon High School	Avon	Website	3,480	9–12	Orioles		Hoosier Crossroads
Bethesda Christian School	Brownsburg	Website	640	P3-12	Patriots		Pioneer
Brownsburg High School	Brownsburg	Website	3,318	9–12	Bulldogs		Hoosier Crossroads
Cascade High School	Clayton	Website	546	9–12	Cadets		Monon Athletic
Danville Community High School	Danville	Website	826	9–12	Warriors		Sagamore
Plainfield High School	Plainfield	Website	1,781	9–12	Quakers		Mid-State
Tri-West High School	Lizton	Website	608	9–12	Bruins		Sagamore

=== Henry County ===
School	City/town	Website	Enrollment (2023–24)	Grades	Mascot	School colors	Conference
Blue River Valley Jr./Sr. High School	Mount Summit	Website	297	7–12	Vikings		Mid-Eastern
Knightstown High School	Knightstown	Website	317	9–12	Panthers		Mid-Hoosier
New Castle High School	New Castle	Website	824	9–12	Trojans		Hoosier Heritage
Shenandoah High School	Middletown	Website	400	9–12	Raiders		Mid-Eastern
Tri Junior-Senior High School	Straughn	Website	460	6–12	Titans		Tri-Eastern

=== Howard County ===
School	City/town	Website	Enrollment (2023–24)	Grades	Mascot	School colors	Conference
Eastern Junior-Senior High School	Greentown	Website	499	9–12	Comets		Hoosier Heartland
Kokomo High School	Kokomo	Website	1,472	9–12	Wildkats		North Central
Northwestern High School	Kokomo	Website	554	9–12	Tigers		Three Rivers
Taylor High School	Kokomo	Website	368	9–12	Titans		Hoosier Heartland
Western High School	Russiaville	Website	795	9–12	Panthers		Hoosier Athletic

=== Huntington County ===
School	City/town	Website	Enrollment (2023–24)	Grades	Mascot	School colors	Conference
Huntington North High School	Huntington	Website	1,396	9–12	Vikings		Northeast Eight

== J ==
=== Jackson County ===
School	City/town	Website	Enrollment (2023–24)	Grades	Mascot	School colors	Conference
Brownstown Central High School	Brownstown	Website	469	9–12	Braves		Mid-Southern
Crothersville Junior-Senior High School	Crothersville	Website	220	6–12	Tigers		Southern
Medora Junior-Senior High School	Medora	Website	96	6–12	Hornets		Southern Roads
Seymour High School	Seymour	Website	1,726	9–12	Owls		Hoosier Hills
Trinity Lutheran High School	Seymour	Website	133	9–12	Cougars		Independent

=== Jasper County ===
School	City/town	Website	Enrollment	Grades	Mascot	School colors	Conference
DeMotte Christian Schools	DeMotte	Website	268	6–12	Knights		Independent
Kankakee Valley High School	Wheatfield	Website	995	9–12	Kougars		Northwest Crossroads
Rensselaer Central High School	Rensselaer	Website	453	9–12	Bombers		Hoosier Athletic

=== Jay County ===
School	City/town	Website	Enrollment (2023–24)	Grades	Mascot	School colors	Conference
Jay County Jr-Sr High School	Portland	Website	1,278	7–12	Patriots		Allen County

=== Jefferson County ===
School	City/town	Website	Enrollment (2023–24)	Grades	Mascot	School colors	Conference
Madison Consolidated High School	Madison	Website	761	9–12	Cubs		Mid-Southern
Shawe Memorial High School	Madison	Website	196	7–12	Hilltoppers		Ohio River Valley
Southwestern Jefferson County High School	Hanover	Website	354	9–12	Rebels		Ohio River Valley

=== Jennings County ===
School	City/town	Website	Enrollment (2023–24)	Grades	Mascot	School colors	Conference
Jennings County High School	North Vernon	Website	1,174	9–12	Panthers		Hoosier Hills

=== Johnson County ===
School	City/town	Website	Enrollment (2023–24)	Grades	Mascot	School colors	Conference
Center Grove High School	Greenwood	Website	2,893	9–12	Trojans		Metropolitan Interscholastic
Edinburgh High School Middle School	Edinburgh	Website	227	6–12	Lancers		Mid-Hoosier
Franklin Community High School	Franklin	Website	1,590	9–12	Grizzly Cubs		Mid-State
Greenwood Christian Academy	Greenwood	Website	818	PreK–12	Cougars		Pioneer
Greenwood Community High School	Greenwood	Website	1,219	9–12	Woodmen		Mid-State
Indian Creek Senior School	Trafalgar	Website	637	9–12	Braves		Western
Whiteland Community High School	Whiteland	Website	2,082	9–12	Warriors		Mid-State

== K ==
=== Knox County ===
School	City/town	Website	Enrollment (2023–24)	Grades	Mascot	School colors	Conference
Lincoln High School	Vincennes	Website	711	9–12	Alices		Southern Indiana
North Knox Jr/Sr High School	Bicknell	Website	556	7–12	Warriors		Blue Chip
Rivet Middle & High School	Vincennes	Website	155	6–12	Patriots		Blue Chip
South Knox Middle/High School	Vincennes	Website	580	7–12	Spartans		Blue Chip

=== Kosciusko County ===
School	City/town	Website	Enrollment (2023–24)	Grades	Mascot	School colors	Conference
Lakeland Christian Academy	Winona Lake	Website	418	7–12	Cougars		Independent
Tippecanoe Valley High School	Mentone	Website	543	9–12	Vikings		Indiana Northern State
Warsaw Community High School	Warsaw	Website	2,119	9–12	Tigers		Northern Lakes
Wawasee High School	Syracuse	Website	901	9–12	Warriors		Northern Lakes

== L ==
=== LaGrange County ===
School	City/town	Website	Enrollment (2023–24)	Grades	Mascot	School colors	Conference
Lakeland Jr/Sr High School	LaGrange	Website	764	7–12	Lakers		Northeast Corner
Prairie Heights High School	LaGrange	Website	422	9–12	Panthers		Northeast Corner
Westview Junior-Senior High School	Topeka	Website	687	7–12	Warriors		Northeast Corner

=== Lake County ===
School	City/town	Website	Enrollment (2023–24)	Grades	Mascot	School colors	Conference
Andrean High School	Merrillville	Website	408	9–12	Fighting 59ers		Northwest Crossroads
Bishop Noll Institute	Hammond	Website	613	9–12	Warriors		Greater South Shore
Calumet New Tech High School	Calumet Township, Gary	Website	612	9–12	Warriors		Greater South Shore
Crown Point High School	Crown Point	Website	2,998	9–12	Bulldogs		Duneland
East Chicago Central High School	East Chicago	Website	1,021	9–12	Cardinals		Great Lakes
Griffith Jr./Sr. High School	Griffith	Website	1,090	6–13	Panthers		Northwest Crossroads
Hammond Baptist Schools	Schererville	Website	240 (HS)	K–12	Swordsmen		
Hanover Central High School	Cedar Lake	Website	817	9–12	Wildcats		Northwest Crossroads
Highland High School	Highland	Website	980	9–12	Trojans		Northwest Crossroads
Hobart High School	Hobart	Website	1,343	9–12	Brickies		Northwest Crossroads
Illiana Christian High School	Dyer	Website	602	9–12	Vikings		
Lake Central High School	St. John	Website	2,992	9–12	Indians		Duneland
Lowell High School	Lowell	Website	985	9–12	Red Devils		Northwest Crossroads
Merrillville High School	Merrillville	Website	2,051	9–12	Pirates		Duneland
Morton High School	Hammond	Website	1,534	9–12	Governors		Great Lakes
Munster High School	Munster	Website	1,524	9–12	Mustangs		Northwest Crossroads
River Forest High School	Hobart	Website	532	6–12	Ingots		Greater South Shore
Thea Bowman Leadership Academy	Gary	Website	849	K–12	Eagles		Independent
Thomas A. Edison Jr. Sr. High School	Lake Station	Website	614	6–12	Fighting Eagles		Greater South Shore
West Side Leadership Academy	Gary	Website	998	9–12	Cougars		Great Lakes
Whiting High School	Whiting	Website	422	9–12	Oilers		Greater South Shore
William Merritt Chase Alternative School (closed)	Gary	Website	105	7–12			

=== LaPorte County ===
School	City/town	Website	Enrollment (2023–24)	Grades	Mascot	School colors	Conference
La Lumiere High School	LaPorte	Website	162	9–12	Lakers		
LaCrosse High School (closed)	LaCrosse		171	9–12	Tigers		Porter County
LaPorte High School	LaPorte	Website	1,851	9–12	Slicers		Duneland
Marquette Catholic High School	Michigan City	Website	217	9–12	Blazers		Greater South Shore
Michigan City High School	Michigan City	Website	1,531	9–12	Wolves		Duneland
New Prairie High School	Wills	Website	970	9–12	Cougars		Northern Indiana
South Central Jr.-Sr. High School	Union Mills	Website	455	7–12	Satellites		Porter County
Westville Middle/High School	Westville	Website	427	7–12	Blackhawks		Porter County

=== Lawrence County ===
School	City/town	Website	Enrollment (2023–24)	Grades	Mascot	School colors	Conference
Bedford North Lawrence High School	Bedford	Website	1,249	9–12	Stars		Hoosier Hills
Mitchell High School	Mitchell	Website	213	9–12	Bluejackets		Patoka Lake
Stone City Christian Academy	Bedford	Website	66	K–12	Panthers		

== M ==
=== Madison County ===
School	City/town	Website	Enrollment (2023–24)	Grades	Mascot	School colors	Conference
Alexandria Monroe Junior/Senior High School	Alexandria	Website	690	7–12	Tigers		Central Indiana
Anderson High School	Anderson	Website	1,722	9–12	Indians		North Central
Anderson Preparatory Academy	Anderson	Website	843	K–12	Jets		Pioneer
Elwood Junior-Senior High School	Elwood	Website	633	7–12	Panthers		Central Indiana
Frankton Junior-Senior High School	Frankton	Website	794	7–12	Eagles		Central Indiana
Lapel High School	Lapel	Website	466	9–12	Bulldogs		Independent
Liberty Christian School	Anderson	Website	388	PK–12	Lions		Pioneer
Pendleton Heights High School	Pendleton	Website	1,353	9–12	Arabians		Hoosier Heritage

=== Marion County ===
School	City/town	Website	Enrollment (2023–24)	Grades	Mascot	School colors	Conference
Arsenal Technical High School	Indianapolis	Website	2,524	9–12	Titans		North Central
Beech Grove High School	Beech Grove	Website	892	9–12	Hornets		Indiana Crossroads
Ben Davis High School	Indianapolis	Website	3,274	10–12	Giants		Metropolitan
Bishop Chatard High School	Indianapolis	Website	720	9–12	Trojans		Circle City
BELIEVE Circle City High School	Indianapolis	Website	317	9–12	Cyclones		
Brebeuf Jesuit Preparatory School	Indianapolis	Website	829	9–12	Braves		Circle City
Calvary Christian School	Indianapolis	Website	273	K–12	Eagles		Central Indiana Christian
Cardinal Ritter High School	Indianapolis	Website	566	7–12	Raiders		Indiana Crossroads
Cathedral High School	Indianapolis	Website	1,171	9–12	Fighting Irish		Independent
Christel House Watanabe High School	Indianapolis	Website	420	9–12	Eagles		Greater Indianapolis
Covenant Christian High School	Indianapolis	Website	383	9–12	Warriors		Circle City
Crispus Attucks High School	Indianapolis	Website	1,179	9–12	Tigers		Pioneer
Decatur Central High School	Indianapolis	Website	2,061	9–12	Hawks		Mid-State
Franklin Central High School	Indianapolis	Website	3,381	9–12	Flashes		Hoosier Crossroads
George Washington Community High School	Indianapolis	Website	624	9–12	Continentals		Greater Indianapolis
Heritage Christian School	Indianapolis	Website	1,567	K–12	Eagles		Circle City Conference
Herron High School	Indianapolis	Website	998	9–12	Achaens		Independent
Herron-Riverside High School	Indianapolis	Website	333	6–12	Argonauts		Independent
Indiana School for the Deaf	Indianapolis	Website	350	PK–12	Deaf Hoosiers		Independent
Irvington Preparatory Academy	Indianapolis	Website	310	6–12	Ravens		Greater Indianapolis
KIPP Indy Legacy High School	Indianapolis	Website	390	9–12	Lions		
Lawrence Central High School	Lawrence	Website	2,417	9–12	Bears		Metropolitan
Lawrence North High School	Lawrence	Website	2,832	9–12	Wildcats		Metropolitan
Lutheran High School of Indianapolis	Indianapolis	Website	267	9–12	Saints		Indiana Crossroads
Metropolitan High School	Indianapolis	Website	299	9–12	Pumas		Greater Indianapolis
North Central High School	Indianapolis	Website	3,616	9–12	Panthers		Metropolitan
Park Tudor School	Indianapolis	Website	343	PK–12	Panthers		Pioneer
Perry Meridian High School	Indianapolis	Website	2,373	9–12	Falcons		Mid State
Pike High School	Indianapolis	Website	3,193	9–12	Red Devils		Metropolitan
Providence Cristo Rey	Indianapolis	Website	266	9–12	Wolves		Independent
Purdue Polytechnic High School Englewood	Indianapolis	Website	365	9–12	Techies		Independent
Purdue Polytechnic High School Broad Ripple	Indianapolis	Website		9–12	Techies		Independent
Roncalli High School	Indianapolis	Website	1,082	9–12	Royals		Circle City
Scecina Memorial High School	Indianapolis	Website	454	9–12	Crusaders		Indiana Crossroads
Shortridge High School	Indianapolis	Website	1,027	9–12	Blue Devils		Pioneer
Southport High School	Indianapolis	Website	2,376	9–12	Cardinals		Conference Indiana
Speedway Senior High School	Speedway	Website	565	9–12	Sparkplugs		Indiana Crossroads
Tindley Accelerated High School	Indianapolis	Website	273	7–12	Tigers		Greater Indianapolis
Victory College Prep Academy	Indianapolis	Website	237	9–12	Firehawks		Greater Indianapolis
Warren Central High School	Indianapolis	Website	3,398	9–12	Warriors		Metropolitan

=== Marshall County ===
School	City/town	Website	Enrollment (2023–24)	Grades	Mascot	School colors	Conference
Argos Junior/Senior High School	Argos	Website	95	6–12	Dragons		Independent
Bourbon Christian School	Bourbon	Website	33	1–12	Lions		
Bremen High School	Bremen	Website	471	9–12	Lions		Northern Indiana
The Culver Academies	Culver	Website	830	9–12	Eagles		Independent
Culver Middle/High School	Culver	Website	412	6–12	Cavaliers		Hoosier North
Grace Baptist Christian School	Plymouth	Website	80	K–12	Lions		
Plymouth High School	Plymouth	Website	1,062	9–12	Rockies / Pilgrims		Northern Lakes
Triton Jr/Sr High School	Bourbon	Website	434	7–12	Trojans		Hoosier North

=== Martin County ===
School	City/town	Website	Enrollment (2023–24)	Grades	Mascot	School colors	Conference
Loogootee High School	Loogootee	Website	242	9–12	Lions		Blue Chip
Shoals High School	Shoals	Website	210	9–12	Jug Rox		Blue Chip

=== Miami County ===
School	City/town	Website	Enrollment (2023–24)	Grades	Mascot	School colors	Conference
Maconaquah High School	Bunker Hill	Website	604	9–12	Braves		Three Rivers
North Miami Middle/High School	Denver	Website	388	7–12	Warriors		Hoosier North
Peru Junior/Senior High School	Peru	Website	852	7–12	Tigers		Three Rivers

* Though Oak Hill's mailing address is Converse, the actual school grounds are located in Grant County.

=== Monroe County ===
School	City/town	Website	Enrollment (2023–24)	Grades	Mascot	School colors	Conference
Bloomington High School North	Bloomington	Website	1,562	9–12	Cougars		Conference Indiana
Bloomington High School South	Bloomington	Website	1,670	9–12	Panthers		Conference Indiana
Edgewood High School	Ellettsville	Website	762	9–12	Mustangs		Western Indiana
Harmony School	Bloomington	Website	177	K–12	Rhino		
Lighthouse Christian Academy	Bloomington	Website	306	K–12	Lions		Southern Roads Seven Oaks Classical. Ellettsville, Indiana

=== Montgomery County ===
School	City/town	Website	Enrollment (2023–24)	Grades	Mascot	School colors	Conference
Crawfordsville High School	Crawfordsville	Website	650	9-12	Athenians		Monon Athletic
North Montgomery High School	Crawfordsville	Website	513	9–12	Chargers		Monon Athletic
Southmont Senior High School	Crawfordsville	Website	453	9–12	Mounties		Monon Athletic

=== Morgan County ===
School	City/town	Website	Enrollment (2023–24)	Grades	Mascot	School colors	Conference
Eminence Junior & Senior High School	Eminence	Website	159	6–12	Eels		Greater Indianapolis
Martinsville High School	Martinsville	Website	1,315	9–12	Artesians		Mid-State
Monrovia High School	Monrovia	Website	503	9–12	Bulldogs		Indiana Crossroads
Mooresville High School	Mooresville	Website	1,380	9–12	Pioneers		Mid-State
Tabernacle Christian School	Martinsville	Website	414	PreK–12	Eagles		

== N ==
=== Newton County ===
School	City/town	Website	Enrollment (2023–24)	Grades	Mascot	School colors	Conference
North Newton Junior-Senior High School	Morocco	Website	499	7–12	Spartans		Midwest
South Newton High School	Kentland	Website	241	9–12	Rebels		Midwest

=== Noble County ===
School	City/town	Website	Enrollment (2023–24)	Grades	Mascot	School colors	Conference
Central Noble Junior-Senior High School	Albion	Website	626	9–12	Cougars		Northeast Corner
Cornerstone Christian School (Closed)	Albion	Website	60	K–12	Knights		
East Noble High School	Kendallville	Website	999	9–12	Knights		Northeast Eight
Oak Farm Montessori School	Avilla	Website	68 (9–12)	K–12	Falcons		
West Noble High School	Ligonier	Website	724	9–12	Chargers		Northeast Corner

== O ==
=== Ohio County ===
School	City/town	Website	Enrollment (2023–24)	Grades	Mascot	School colors	Conference
Rising Sun High School	Rising Sun	Website	233	9–12	Shiners		Ohio River Valley

=== Orange County ===
School	City/town	Website	Enrollment (2023–24)	Grades	Mascot	School colors	Conference
Orleans Junior-Senior High School	Orleans	Website	398	7–12	Bulldogs		Patoka Lake
Paoli Junior-Senior High School	Paoli	Website	571	7–12	Rams		Patoka Lake
Springs Valley Junior-Senior High School	French Lick	Website	452	6–12	Blackhawks		Patoka Lake

=== Owen County ===
School	City/town	Website	Enrollment (2023–24)	Grades	Mascot	School colors	Conference
Owen Valley Community High School	Spencer	Website	650	9–12	Patriots		Western Indiana

== P ==
=== Parke County ===
School	City/town	Website	Enrollment (2023–24)	Grades	Mascot	School colors	Conference
Riverton Parke Junior-Senior High School	Montezuma	Website	485	7–12	Panthers		Wabash River
Parke Heritage High School	Rockville	Website	356	9–12	Wolves		Wabash River

=== Perry County ===
School	City/town	Website	Enrollment (2023–24)	Grades	Mascot	School colors	Conference
Cannelton Elementary and High School	Cannelton	Website	197	PreK–12	Bulldogs		Southern Roads
Cornerstone Christian School	Cannelton	Website	12	1–12	Eagles		
Perry Central Junior-Senior High School	Leopold	Website	558	7–12	Commodores		Patoka Lake
Tell City High School	Tell City	Website	616	7–12	Marksmen		Pocket Athletic

=== Pike County ===
School	City/town	Website	Enrollment (2023–24)	Grades	Mascot	School colors	Conference
Pike Central High School	Petersburg	Website	474	9–12	Chargers		Pocket Athletic

=== Porter County ===
School	City/town	Website	Enrollment (2023–24)	Grades	Mascot	School colors	Conference
Boone Grove High School	Valparaiso	Website	475	9–12	Wolves		Porter County
Chesterton High School	Chesterton	Website	1,985	9–12	Trojans		Duneland
Fairhaven Baptist Academy	Chesterton	Website	168	K–12	Conquerors		
Hebron High School	Hebron	Website	339	9–12	Hawks		Porter County
Kouts Middle-High School	Kouts	Website	411	K–12	Mustangs		Porter County
Morgan Township Middle-High School	Valparaiso	Website	431	6–12	Cherokees		Porter County
Portage Christian School	Portage	Website	237	PreK–12	Pacers		
Portage High School	Portage	Website	2,198	9–12	Indians		Duneland
Shults-Lewis Child & Family Services	Valparaiso	Website	5	7–12			
Valparaiso High School	Valparaiso	Website	2,151	9–12	Vikings		Duneland
Washington Township Middle-High School	Valparaiso	Website	433	6–12	Senators		Porter County
Wheeler High School	Wheeler	Website	417	9–12	Bearcats		Greater South Shore

=== Posey County ===
School	City/town	Website	Enrollment (2023–24)	Grades	Mascot	School colors	Conference
Mount Vernon High School	Mount Vernon	Website	576	9–12	Wildcats		Pocket Athletic
North Posey High School	Poseyville	Website	442	9–12	Vikings		Pocket Athletic

=== Pulaski County ===
School	City/town	Website	Enrollment (2023–24)	Grades	Mascot	School colors	Conference
West Central Senior High School	Francesville	Website	212	9–12	Trojans		Midwest
Winamac Community High School	Winamac	Website	360	9–12	Warriors		Hoosier North

=== Putnam County ===
School	City/town	Website	Enrollment (2023–24)	Grades	Mascot	School colors	Conference
Cloverdale High School	Cloverdale	Website	283	9–12	Clovers		Western Indiana
Greencastle Senior High School	Greencastle	Website	495	9–12	Tiger Cubs		Monon Athletic
North Putnam Senior High School	Roachdale	Website	432	9–12	Cougars		Western Indiana
South Putnam Junior-Senior High School	Greencastle	Website	363	9–12	Eagles		Western Indiana

== R ==
=== Randolph County ===
School	City/town	Website	Enrollment (2023–24)	Grades	Mascot	School colors	Conference
Monroe Central Junior-Senior High School	Parker City	Website	466	7–12	Golden Bears		Mid-Eastern
Randolph Southern Junior-Senior High School	Lynn	Website	211	7–12	Rebels		Mid-Eastern
Union City Community High School	Union City	Website	370	7–12	Indians		Tri-Eastern
Union Junior-Senior High School	Modoc	Website	135	7–12	Rockets		Mid-Eastern
Winchester Community High School	Winchester	Website	408	9–12	Golden Falcons		Tri-Eastern

=== Ripley County ===
School	City/town	Website	Enrollment (2023–24)	Grades	Mascot	School colors	Conference
Batesville High School	Batesville	Website	671	9–12	Bulldogs		Eastern Indiana
Jac-Cen-Del Junior-Senior High School	Osgood	Website	384	7–12	Eagles		Ohio River Valley
Milan High School	Milan	Website	495	9–12	Indians		Ohio River Valley
South Ripley Junior/Senior High School	Versailles	Website	345	9–12	Raiders		Ohio River Valley

=== Rush County ===
School	City/town	Website	Enrollment (2023–24)	Grades	Mascot	School colors	Conference
Rushville Consolidated High School	Rushville	Website	645	9–12	Lions		Eastern Indiana

== S ==
=== St. Joseph County ===
School	City/town	Website	Enrollment 2023–24)	Grades	Mascot	School colors	Conference
Community Baptist Christian School	South Bend	Website	210	PK–12	Cougars		
Granger Christian School	Granger	Website	200	PK–12	Knights		
James Whitcomb Riley High School	South Bend	Website	998	9–12	Wildcats		Northern Indiana
John Adams High School	South Bend	Website	1,987	9–12	Eagles		Northern Indiana
John Glenn High School	Walkerton	Website	633	9–12	Falcons		Northern Indiana
Laville Junior-Senior High School	Lakeville	Website	554	7–12	Lancers		Hoosier North
Marian High School	Mishawaka	Website	735	9–12	Knights		Northern Indiana
Mishawaka High School	Mishawaka	Website	1,437	9–12	Cavemen		Northern Indiana
Penn High School	Mishawaka	Website	3,847	9–12	Kingsmen		Northern Indiana
Rise Up Academy	South Bend	Website	175	9-12			
St. Joseph High School	South Bend	Website	849	9–12	Huskies		Northern Indiana
Trinity School at Greenlawn	South Bend	Website	240	6–12	Titans		
Washington High School	South Bend	Website	812	9–12	Panthers		Northern Indiana

=== Scott County ===
School	City/town	Website	Enrollment (2023–24)	Grades	Mascot	School colors	Conference
Austin High School	Austin	Website	407	9–12	Eagles		Mid-Southern
Scottsburg Senior High School	Scottsburg	Website	730	9–12	Warriors		Mid-Southern

=== Shelby County ===
School	City/town	Website	Enrollment 2023–24)	Grades	Mascot	School colors	Conference
Morristown Junior-Senior High School	Morristown	Website	327	6–12	Yellow Jackets		Mid-Hoosier
Shelbyville Senior High School	Shelbyville	Website	1,093	9–12	Golden Bears		Hoosier Heritage
Southwestern Junior-Senior High School	Flat Rock	Website	280	7–12	Spartans		Mid-Hoosier
Triton Central High School	Fairland	Website	469	9–12	Tigers		Indiana Crossroads
Waldron Junior-Senior High School	Waldron	Website	306	6–12	Mohawks		Mid-Hoosier

=== Spencer County ===
School	City/town	Website	Enrollment (2023–24)	Grades	Mascot	School colors	Conference
Heritage Hills High School	Lincoln City	Website	635	9–12	Patriots		Pocket Athletic
South Spencer High School	Rockport	Website	352	9–12	Rebels		Pocket Athletic

=== Starke County ===
School	City/town	Website	Enrollment (2024–25)	Grades	Mascot	School colors	Conference
Knox Community High School	Knox	Website	500	9–12	Redskins		Northern State
North Judson-San Pierre High School	North Judson	Website	443	9–12	Blue Jays		Hoosier North
Oregon-Davis Junior-Senior High School	Hamlet	Website	228	7–12	Bobcats		Independent

=== Steuben County ===
School	City/town	Website	Enrollment (2023–24)	Grades	Mascot	School colors	Conference
Angola Community High School	Angola	Website	741	9–12	Hornets		Northeast Corner
Fremont High School	Fremont	Website	283	9–12	Eagles		Northeast Corner
Hamilton Community High School	Hamilton	Website	168	7–12	Marines		Northeast Corner

=== Sullivan County ===
School	City/town	Website	Enrollment (2023–24)	Grades	Mascot	School colors	Conference
North Central Junior-Senior High School	Farmersburg	Website	376	9–12	Thunderbirds		Southwestern Indiana
Sullivan High School	Sullivan	Website	503	9–12	Golden Arrows		Western Indiana

=== Switzerland County ===
School	City/town	Website	Enrollment (2023–24)	Grades	Mascot	School colors	Conference
Switzerland County Senior High School	Vevay	Website	469	9–12	Pacers		Ohio River Valley Conference

== T ==
=== Tippecanoe County ===
School	City/town	Website	Enrollment (2023–24)	Grades	Mascot	School colors	Conference
Faith Christian School	Lafayette	Website	765	PreK–12	Eagles		Independent
Jefferson High School	Lafayette	Website	2,113	9–12	Bronchos		North Central
Lafayette Central Catholic Jr/Sr High School	Lafayette	Website	469	7–12	Knights		Hoosier Athletic
McCutcheon High School	Lafayette	Website	1,786	9–12	Mavericks		North Central
West Lafayette Junior-Senior High School	West Lafayette	Website	1,110	7–12	Red Devils		Hoosier Athletic
William Henry Harrison High School (West Lafayette)	Battle Ground	Website	2,169	9–12	Raiders		North Central

=== Tipton County ===
School	City/town	Website	Enrollment (2023–24)	Grades	Mascot	School colors	Conference
Tipton High School	Tipton	Website	454	9–12	Blue Devils		Hoosier Athletic
Tri-Central Middle/High School	Sharpsville	Website	402	6–12	Trojans		Hoosier Heartland

== U ==
=== Union County ===
School	City/town	Website	Enrollment (2023–24)	Grades	Mascot	School colors	Conference
Union County High School	Liberty	Website	391	9–12	Patriots		Tri-Eastern

== V ==
=== Vanderburgh County ===
School	City/town	Website	Enrollment (2023–24)	Grades	Mascot	School colors	Conference
Academy for Innovative Studies	Evansville	Website	359	K–12	Phoenix		Independent
Benjamin Bosse High School	Evansville	Website	826	9–12	Bulldogs		Southern Indiana
Evansville Central High School	Evansville	Website	1,126	9–12	Bears		Southern Indiana
Evansville Day School	Evansville	Website	335	PreK–12	Eagles		Independent
Evansville North High School	Evansville	Website	1,643	9–12	Huskies		Southern Indiana
Francis Joseph Reitz High School	Evansville	Website	1,321	9–12	Panthers		Southern Indiana
Mater Dei High School	Evansville	Website	502	9–12	Wildcats		Southern Indiana
New Tech Institute	Evansville	Website	290	9–12	Thunderbolts		None
Reitz Memorial High School	Evansville	Website	603	9–12	Tigers		Southern Indiana
Signature School	Evansville	Website	378	9–12	Penguins		Independent
Southern Indiana Career & Technical Center	Evansville	Website	788	9–12	None		Independent
William Henry Harrison High School	Evansville	Website	1,209	9–12	Warriors		Southern Indiana

=== Vermillion County ===
School	City/town	Website	Enrollment (2023–24)	Grades	Mascot	School colors	Conference
North Vermillion High School	Cayuga	Website	349	7–12	Falcons		Wabash River
South Vermillion High School	Clinton	Website	468	9–12	Wildcats		Wabash River

=== Virtual schools ===
School	City/town	Website	Enrollment	Grades	Mascot	School colors	Conference
Indiana Virtual School	Indiana	Website	3,000	9–12	Vanguards		Independent

=== Vigo County ===
School	City/town	Website	Enrollment (2023–24)	Grades	Mascot	School colors	Conference
Bible Baptist Academy	Terre Haute	Website	59	K–12	Huskies		
Booker T. Washington Alternative School	Terre Haute	Website	71	6–12	Phoenix		
Eastside Christian Academy	Terre Haute	Website		K–12	Eagles		
Terre Haute North Vigo High School	Terre Haute	Website	1,467	9–12	Patriots		Conference Indiana
Terre Haute South Vigo High School	Terre Haute	Website	1,609	9–12	Braves		Conference Indiana
West Vigo High School	West Terre Haute	Website	518	9–12	Vikings		Western Indiana

== W ==
=== Wabash County ===
School	City/town	Website	Enrollment (2023–24)	Grades	Mascot	School colors	Conference
Emmanuel Christian School	Wabash	Website	110	PreK–12	Eagles		
Manchester Junior-Senior High School	North Manchester	Website	666	7–12	Squires		Three Rivers
Northfield Junior-Senior High School	Wabash	Website	437	7–12	Norsemen		Three Rivers
Southwood Junior-Senior High School	Wabash	Website	457	6–12	Knights		Three Rivers
Wabash High School	Wabash	Website	492	9–12	Apaches		Three Rivers
White's Jr/Sr High School	Wabash	Website	350	6–12			

=== Warren County ===
School	City/town	Website	Enrollment (2023–24)	Grades	Mascot	School colors	Conference
Seeger Memorial Junior-Senior High School	West Lebanon	Website	606	7–12	Patriots		Wabash River

=== Warrick County ===
School	City/town	Website	Enrollment (2023–24)	Grades	Mascot	School colors	Conference
Boonville High School	Boonville	Website	881	9–12	Pioneers		Pocket Athletic
Evansville Christian School	Newburgh	Website	1,063	PreK–12	Eagles		Independent
Tecumseh High School	Lynnville	Website	286	9–12	Braves		Pocket Athletic
John H. Castle High School	Newburgh	Website	1,968	9–12	Knights		Southern Indiana

=== Washington County ===
School	City/town	Website	Enrollment (2023–24)	Grades	Mascot	School colors	Conference
Eastern High School	New Pekin	Website	389	9–12	Musketeers		Mid-Southern
Salem High School	Salem	Website	497	9–12	Lions		Mid-Southern
West Washington Junior-Senior High School	Campbellsburg	Website	409	7–12	Senators		Patoka Lake

=== Wayne County ===
School	City/town	Website	Enrollment (2023–24)	Grades	Mascot	School colors	Conference
Centerville Senior High School	Centerville	Website	515	9–12	Bulldogs		Tri-Eastern
Hagerstown Junior-Senior High School	Hagerstown	Website	542	7–12	Tigers		Tri-Eastern
Lincoln Senior High School	Cambridge City	Website	340	9–12	Golden Eagles		Tri-Eastern
Northeastern High School	Fountain City	Website	423	9–12	Knights		Tri-Eastern
Richmond High School	Richmond	Website	1,331	9–12	Red Devils		North Central
Seton Catholic High School	Richmond	Website	152	9–12	Cardinals		Pioneer

=== Wells County ===
School	City/town	Website	Enrollment (2023–24)	Grades	Mascot	School colors	Conference
Bluffton High School	Bluffton	Website	507	9–12	Tigers		Allen County
Norwell High School	Ossian	Website	745	9–12	Knights		Northeast 8
Southern Wells Jr./Sr. High School	Poneto	Website	384	7–12	Raiders		Allen County

=== White County ===
School	City/town	Website	Enrollment (2023–24)	Grades	Mascot	School colors	Conference
Frontier Junior-Senior High School	Chalmers	Website	281	7–12	Falcons		Midwest
North White High School	Monon	Website	264	9–12	Vikings		Midwest
Tri-County Middle/Senior High School	Wolcott	Website	333	7–12	Cavaliers		Midwest
Twin Lakes High School	Monticello	Website	663	9–12	Indians		Hoosier Athletic

=== Whitley County ===
School	City/town	Website	Enrollment (2023–24)	Grades	Mascot	School colors	Conference
Churubusco High School	Churubusco	Website	636	6–12	Eagles		Northeast Corner
Columbia City High School	Columbia City	Website	1,174	9–12	Eagles		Northeast Eight
Whitko High School	South Whitley	Website	556	7–12	Wildcats		Three Rivers

== See also ==
- List of school districts in Indiana
