= Faith Christian School =

Faith Christian School may refer to:

- Faith Christian School (Alabama) — Anniston, Alabama
- Faith Christian School (Arizona) — Mesa, Arizona
- Faith Christian School (California) — Santa Ana, California
- Faith Christian School (Florida) — Margate, Florida
- Faith Christian School (Georgia) — Vienna, Georgia
- Faith Christian School (Illinois) — Dixon, Illinois
- Faith Christian School (Indiana) — Lafayette, Indiana
- Faith Christian School (Clinton Township, Michigan) — Clinton Township, Michigan
- Faith Christian School (Fremont, Michigan) — Fremont, Michigan
- Faith Christian School (Lake Odessa, Michigan) — Lake Odessa, Michigan
- Faith Christian School (Foreston, Minnesota) — Foreston, Minnesota
- Faith Christian School (Rochester, Minnesota) — Rochester, Minnesota
- Faith Christian School (Florissant, Missouri) — Florissant, Missouri
- Faith Christian School (Spokane, Missouri) — Spokane, Missouri
- Faith Christian School (Nebraska) — Kearney, Nebraska
- Faith Christian School (New York) — Boonville, New York
- Faith Christian School (Hendersonville, North Carolina) — Hendersonville, North Carolina
- Faith Christian School (Ramseur, North Carolina) — Ramseur, North Carolina
- Faith Christian School (Rocky Mount, North Carolina) — Rocky Mount, North Carolina
- Faith Christian School (North Dakota) — Lehr, North Dakota
- Faith Christian School (Ohio) — Greenville, Ohio
- Faith Christian School (Roseto, Pennsylvania) — Roseto, Pennsylvania
- Faith Christian School (Turtle Creek, Pennsylvania) — Turtle Creek, Pennsylvania
- Faith Christian School (Tennessee) — Clinton, Tennessee
- Faith Christian School (Texas) — Grapevine, Texas
- Faith Christian School (Virginia) — Roanoke, Virginia
- Faith Christian School (Coleman, Wisconsin) — Coleman, Wisconsin
- Faith Christian School (Williams Bay, Wisconsin) — Williams Bay, Wisconsin
