= Bethesda Christian School =

Bethesda Christian School may refer to:

- Bethesda Christian School (Brownsburg, Indiana), a private school in Brownsburg, Indiana, U.S.A
- Bethesda Christian School (Fort Worth, Texas), a Christian school located in Fort Worth, Texas
