= Southern Roads Conference =

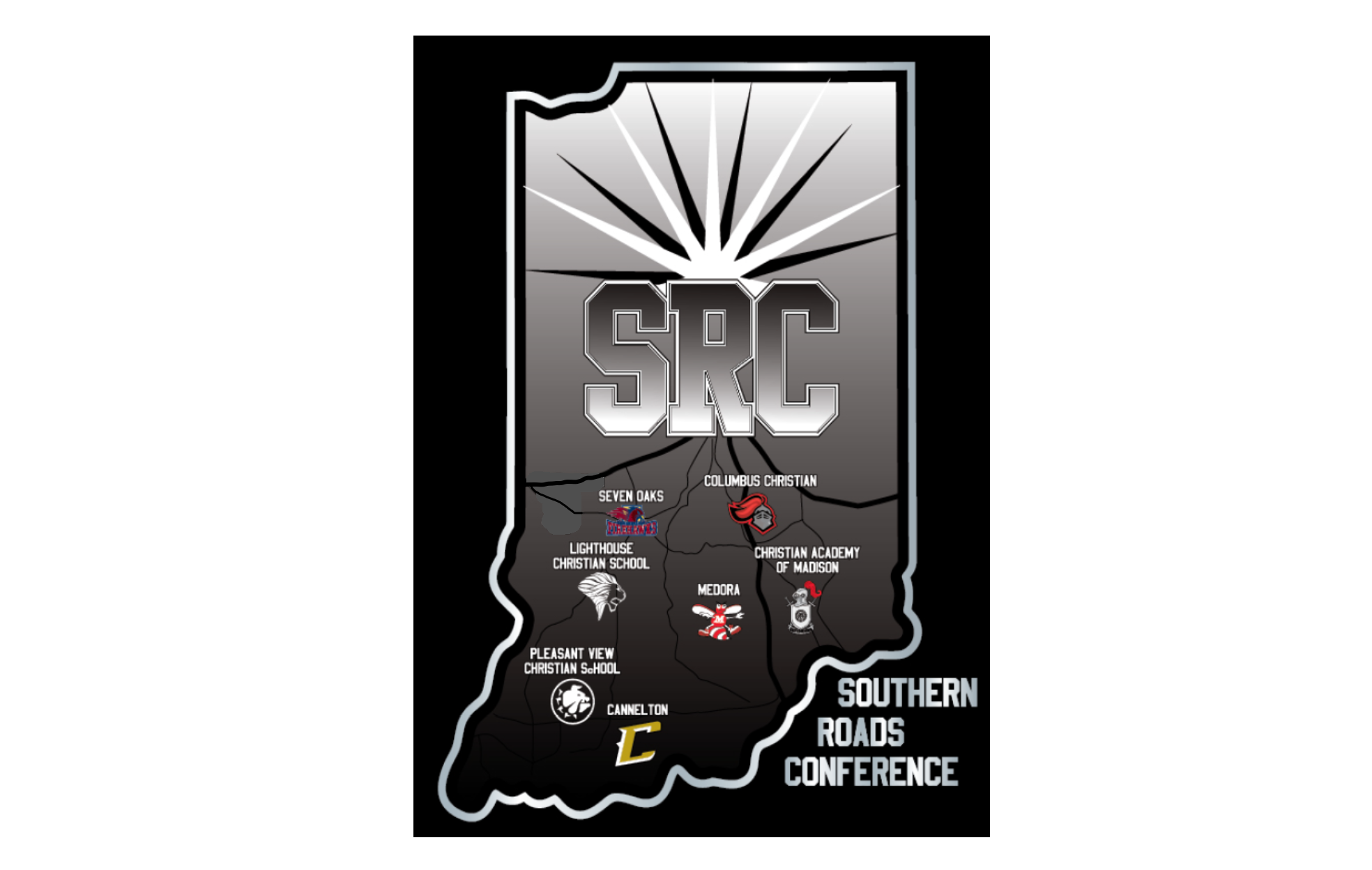
- Conference: IHSAA
- Founded: 2018
- First season: 2018–2019
- Sports fielded: men's: cross country, basketball; women's: cross country, volleyball, basketball
- No. of teams: 7 Class A
- Region: 6 Counties: Perry, Jackson, Bartholomew, Monroe, Jefferson, and Daviess

Locations
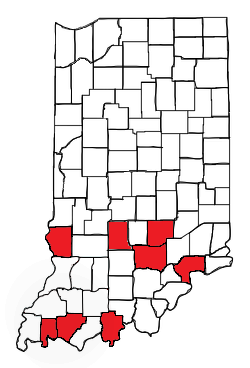

The Southern Roads Conference is an Indiana-based conference containing IHSAA and non-IHSAA public, charter, and religious schools. This league was founded in 2018, as longtime independents Cannelton and Medora wanted to form a conference that would include the isolated small schools.

Charter Members include Cannelton High School, Christian Academy of Madison, Columbus Christian School, Dugger Union High School, Evansville Christian School, and Medora High School.

The first school year of the conference was the 2018–2019 school year. The SRC recognized volleyball, girls basketball, and boys basketball. There was also a conference baseball tournament held that year, since there were enough schools with teams and interest.

The first year for girls and boys cross country was the 2021–2022 school year. Lighthouse Christian hosted the first ever SRC cross country meet. Cross country is now a recognized conference sport.

After the 2020–2021 season, Evansville Christian School left the conference. Their enrollment and sports programs were growing rapidly, and they didn't want the conference to lose its competitiveness.

Lighthouse Christian Academy and Seven Oaks Classical Academy became members during the summer of 2021, with the 2021–2022 school year being their first year with the SRC. Pleasant View Christian School was voted in to the conference in September 2021.

== Membership ==
| School | Location | Mascot | Colors | County | Year joined | Previous conference |
|---|---|---|---|---|---|---|
| Cannelton | Cannelton | Bulldogs | | 62; Perry | 2018 | Independents (TRAC 1989) |
| Christian-Madison* | Madison | Defenders | | 39; Jefferson | 2018 | Independents |
| Columbus Christian* | Columbus | Crusaders | | 03; Bartholomew | 2018 | Independents |
| Medora | Medora | Hornets | | 36; Jackson | 2018 | Independents (TRAC 1989) |
| Lighthouse Christian | Bloomington | Lions | | 53 Monroe | 2020 | Independents |
| Pleasant View* | Montgomery | Bulldogs | | 14; Daviess | 2021 | Independents |
| Seven Oaks Classical | Ellettsvile | Firehawks | | 53; Monroe | 2021 | Independents |

- -Non-IHSAA Member School

=== Former Members ===
| School | Location | Mascot | Colors | County | Year Left | Current conference |
|---|---|---|---|---|---|---|
| Evansville Christian | Evansville Newburgh | Eagles | | 82; Vanderburgh; 87; Warrick | 2021 | Independents |
| Union (Dugger)^{1} | Dugger | Bulldogs | | 77; Sullivan | 2022 | Independents |

1. Union closed in 2014 as a public school, though a charter school opened that same year, retaining its history.

== Conference Tournament Championships ==
=== Boys basketball ===
| # | Team | Seasons |
|---|---|---|
| 2 | Cannelton | 2018–2019 2019–2020 |
| 0 | Christian Academy | |
| 0 | Columbus Christian | |
| 1 | Dugger Union | 2021–2022 |
| 1 | Evansville Christian | 2020–2021 |
| 1 | Lighthouse Christian | 2022–2023 |
| 0 | Medora | |
| 0 | Pleasant View | |
| 0 | Seven Oaks | |

=== Girls basketball ===
| # | Team | Seasons |
|---|---|---|
| 2 | Cannelton | 2021–2022 2022–2023 |
| 0 | Christian Academy | |
| 2 | Columbus Christian | 2019–2020 2020–2021 |
| 1 | Dugger Union | 2018–2019 |
| 0 | Evansville Christian | |
| 0 | Lighthouse Christian | |
| 0 | Medora | |
| 0 | Pleasant View | |
| 0 | Seven Oaks | |

=== Girls volleyball ===
| # | Team | Seasons |
|---|---|---|
| 0 | Cannelton | |
| 0 | Christian Academy | |
| 2 | Columbus Christian | 2018–2019 2019–2020 |
| 1 | Dugger Union | 2021–2022 |
| 0 | Evansville Christian | |
| 2 | Lighthouse Christian | 2024–2025 2025–2026 |
| 0 | Medora | |
| 1 | Pleasant View | 2022–2023 |
| 0 | Seven Oaks | |

(no volleyball tournament held in 2020–2021 season due to pandemic)

=== Boys cross country ===
| # | Team | Seasons |
|---|---|---|
| 0 | Cannelton | |
| 0 | Christian Academy | |
| 0 | Columbus Christian | |
| 0 | Dugger Union | |
| 0 | Evansville Christian | |
| 1 | Lighthouse Christian | 2021–2022 |
| 0 | Medora | |
| 0 | Pleasant View | |
| 1 | Seven Oaks | 2022–2023 |

=== Girls cross country ===
| # | Team | Seasons |
|---|---|---|
| 0 | Cannelton | |
| 0 | Christian Academy | |
| 0 | Columbus Christian | |
| 0 | Dugger Union | |
| 0 | Evansville Christian | |
| 2 | Lighthouse Christian | 2021–2022 2022–2023 |
| 0 | Medora | |
| 0 | Pleasant View | |
| 0 | Seven Oaks | |

== Conference Season Championships ==
=== Boys basketball ===
| # | Team | Seasons |
|---|---|---|
| 1 | Cannelton | 2018–2019 (tie) |
| 1 | Christian Academy | 2018–2019 (tie) |
| | Columbus Christian | |
| | Dugger Union | |
| 2 | Evansville Christian | 2019–2020 2020–2021 |
| 2 | Lighthouse Christian | 2021–2022 (co-champs) 2022–2023 (co-champs) |
| | Medora | |
| | Pleasant View | |
| | Seven Oaks | |

=== Girls basketball ===
| # | Team | Seasons | | |
|---|---|---|---|---|
| 2 | Cannelton | 2021–2022 2022–2023 | | |
| | Christian Academy | | | |
| 3 | Columbus Christian | 2019–2020 2020–2021 2025–2026 | | |
| 1 | Dugger Union | 2018–2019 | | |
| | Evansville Christian | | | |
| | Lighthouse Christian | | 2021–2022 (co-champs) | Medora |
| | Pleasant View | | | |
| | Seven Oaks | | | |

=== Girls volleyball ===
| # | Team | Seasons |
|---|---|---|
| 0 | Cannelton | |
| 1 | Christian Academy | 2021–2022 |
| 3 | Columbus Christian | 2018–2019 2019–2020 2020–2021 |
| | Dugger Union | |
| | Evansville Christian | |
| | Lighthouse Christian | |
| | Medora | |
| | Pleasant View | |
| | Seven Oaks | |
