= Bourbon Township, Marshall County, Indiana =

Bourbon Township
- Township
- Location in Marshall County
- Coordinates: 41°19′42″N 86°07′34″W
- Country: United States
- State: Indiana
- County: Marshall

Government
  - Type: Indiana township
  - Trustee: Ryan F. Schori

Area
  - Total: 49.67 sq mi (128.6 km^{2})
  - Land: 49.62 sq mi (128.5 km^{2})
  - Water: 0.05 sq mi (0.13 km^{2}) 0.10%
- Elevation: 827 ft (252 m)

Population (2020)
  - Total: 2,861
  - Density: 63.5/sq mi (24.5/km^{2})
- ZIP codes: 46501, 46504, 46506, 46524, 46563
- GNIS feature ID: 0453132

Bourbon Township is one of ten townships in Marshall County, Indiana, USA. As of the 2020 census, its population was 2,861 (down from 3,152 at 2010) and it contained 1,192 housing units.

== History ==
Bourbon Township was organized January 6, 1840. It was most likely named for Bourbon County, Kentucky, from where most of the early settlers emigrated. The town of Bourbon, Indiana received its name for the same reason.

== Geography ==
According to the 2010 census, the township has a total area of 49.67 square miles (128.6 km^{2}), of which 49.62 square miles (128.5 km^{2}) (or 99.90%) is land and 0.05 square miles (0.13 km^{2}) (or 0.10%) is water.

=== Cities, towns, villages ===
- Bourbon

=== Cemeteries ===
The township contains five cemeteries: Ganshorn, Parks Memorial, Sandridge aka Foster Chapel, Mt. Pleasant, and Pleasant Hill.

=== Major highways ===
- US 30
- SR 331

== Education ==
- Triton School Corporation

Bourbon Township residents may obtain a free library card from the Bourbon Public Library in Bourbon.

== Political districts ==
- Indiana's 2nd congressional district
- State House District 23
- State Senate District 9
