= Three Rivers Athletic Conference (Indiana) =

The Three Rivers Athletic Conference was a short-lived conference based in Southern Indiana, not to be confused with the Three Rivers Conference in northern Indiana, which still exists. The five schools that made the conference were very small, far-flung schools that were unable to find a home in closer leagues for various reasons. The league folded in 1989 due to travel concerns, with all the members becoming independent. New Harmony closed in 2012, while Cannelton and Medora joined the Southern Roads Conference in 2018, while Christian Academy of Indiana (formerly Graceland Christian) and Evansville Day remain independent.

== Members ==
School	Location	Mascot	Colors	County	Year joined	Previous conference	Year left	Conference joined
Cannelton	Cannelton	Bulldogs		62; Perry	1979	Blue River	1989	Independents (Southern Roads 2018)
Graceland Christian	New Albany	Warriors		22; Floyd	1979	joined IHSAA	1989	Independents
Evansville Day	Evansville	Eagles		82; Vanderburgh	1979	Independents	1989	Independents
Medora	Medora	Hornets		36; Jackson	1979	Independents (DMC 1974)	1989	Independents (Southern Roads 2018)
New; Harmony	New Harmony	Rappites		65; Posey	1979	Independents	1989	Independents (school closed 2012)

== Resources ==
- Graceland Christian All-Time Results
