= Bourbon Christian School =

Location
- 1325 North Main Street; Bourbon, Marshall County, Indiana 46504; United States
- Coordinates: 41.306446°N 86.116438°W

Information
- Type: Private Christian
- Principal: Leon Troyer
- Faculty: 4
- Grades: 1-12
- Enrollment: 33 (2013-2014)

Bourbon Christian School is a private Christian school located in Bourbon, Indiana.

== See also ==
- List of high schools in Indiana
