= Crawford County High School =

Crawford County High School may refer to:

- Crawford County High School (Indiana) in Marengo, Indiana, and also known as Crawford County Junior-Senior High School
- Crawford County High School (Georgia) in Roberta, Georgia
