= Morgan Township, Porter County, Indiana =

Morgan Township
- Township
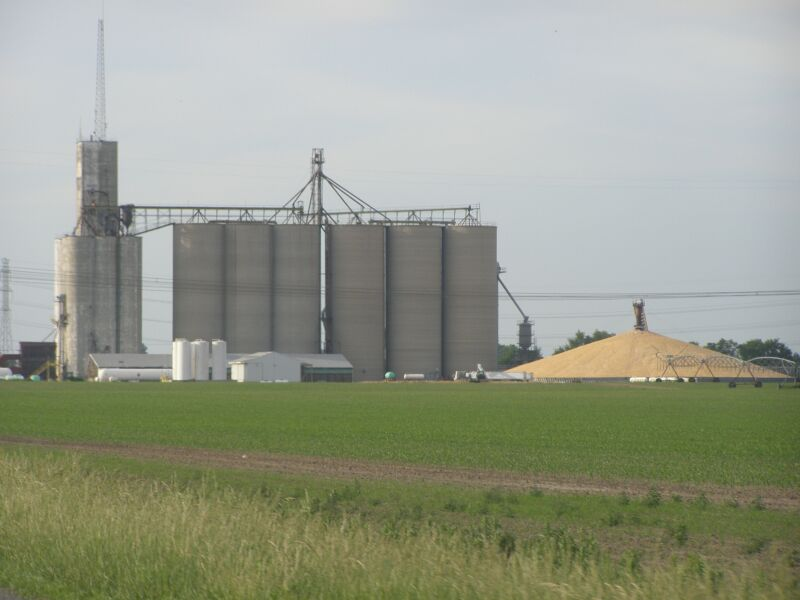
- Malden grain elevator

- Seal

- Coordinates: 41°23′53″N 86°59′44″W
- Country: United States
- State: Indiana
- County: Porter
- Organized: 1843

Government
  - Type: Indiana township
  - Trustee: Rodney King

Area
  - Total: 45.80 sq mi (118.63 km^{2})
  - Land: 45.80 sq mi (118.63 km^{2})
  - Water: 0 sq mi (0.00 km^{2})
- Elevation: 719 ft (219 m)

Population (2020)
  - Total: 3,988
  - Density: 80.4/sq mi (31.05/km^{2})
- Time zone: UTC-6 (Central (CST))
  - Summer (DST): UTC-5 (CDT)
- Area code: 219
- FIPS code: 18-51066
- GNIS feature ID: 453655
- Website: morgantwptrustee.org

Morgan Township is one of twelve townships in Porter County, Indiana. As of the 2010 census, its population was 3,684.

Historical population
Census	Pop.	Note	%±
1890	830		—
1900	884		6.5%
1910	812		−8.1%
1920	792		−2.5%
1930	775		−2.1%
1940	738		−4.8%
1950	782		6.0%
1960	920		17.6%
1970	1,102		19.8%
1980	1,769		60.5%
1990	2,102		18.8%
2000	2,658		26.5%
2010	3,684		38.6%
2020	3,988		8.3%

== History ==
Morgan Township was organized in 1843.

== Cities and towns ==
The unincorporated community of Malden is the only town within the township.

== Education ==
Morgan Township is served by the East Porter County School Corporation. The high school is Morgan Township Middle-High School, located north of Malden on State Route 49.

== Cemeteries ==
Name	Location	Picture	Ref pg	Ref pg	
Adams Cemetery	150E at 250 S	Morgan			front
Stoner Cemetery (private)	South Sager Rd	Morgan			front
White Cemetery (private)	150 S near 75E	Morgan			front
