= Bourbon Community Building-Gymnasium =

- Formerly listed on the U.S. National Register of Historic Places
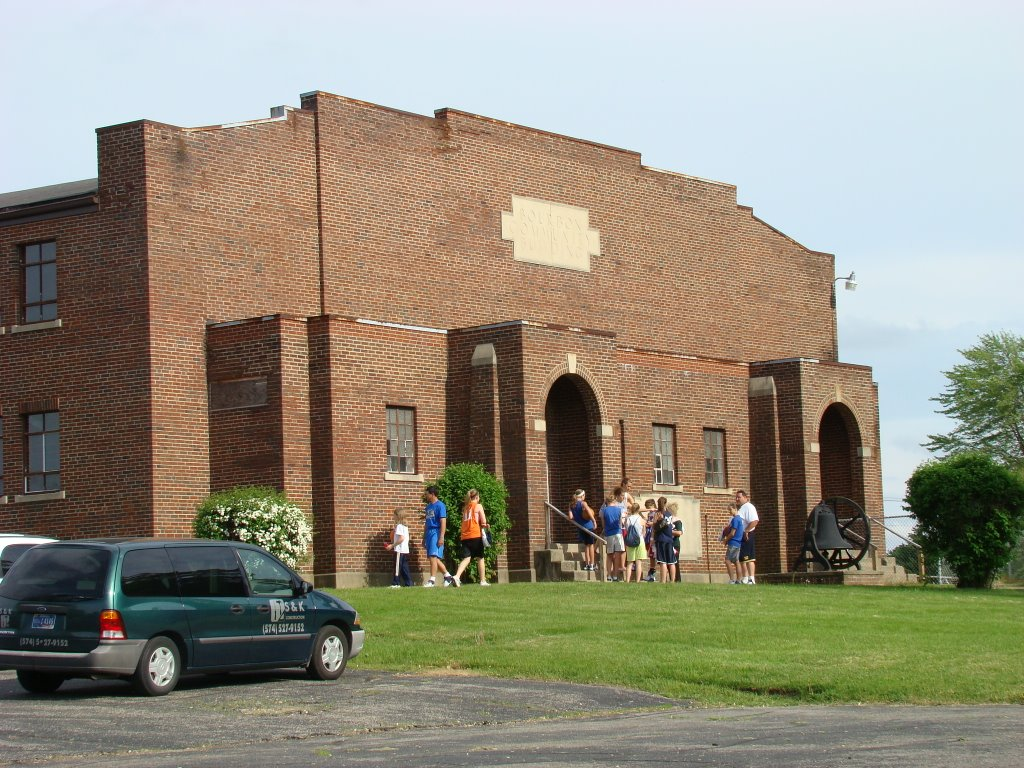
- Bourbon Community Building-Gymnasium, May 2008

- Location within Indiana Location within the United States
- Location: 800 N. Harris St., Bourbon, Indiana
- Coordinates: 41°18′08″N 86°06′48″W
- Area: less than 1 acre (0.40 ha)
- Built: 1928
- Architect: Bradley, Andy Babcock; M.R. Hodges & Sons
- Architectural style: Colonial Revival
- Demolished: 2021
- MPS: Indiana's Public Common and High Schools MPS
- NRHP reference No.: 15000888

Significant dates
- Added to NRHP: December 15, 2015
- Removed from NRHP: May 13, 2021

Bourbon Community Building-Gymnasium was a historic gymnasium and community center located at Bourbon, Indiana. The gym was built in 1928 and demolished in 2021. It was a two-story, dark red and brown colored brick building with Colonial Revival style design elements. It sits on a concrete foundation and has a barrel-vaulted roof. The lawn terrace wall and steps, built in 1924, are a contributing structure. The gym was associated with the Triton Junior–Senior High School.

It was listed on the National Register of Historic Places in 2015, and was delisted in 2021.
