= Stone City Christian Academy =

Location
- 1813 26th Street; Bedford, Lawrence County, Indiana 47421; United States
- 38.850631°N 86.497132°W

Information
- Type: Private Christian
- Principal: David Crosley
- Grades: K–12
- Enrollment: 66 (2023–24)
- Website: www.facebook.com/SCCApanthers

Stone City Christian Academy is a private Christian school located in Bedford, Indiana. This school was established in 1980.

== See also ==
- List of high schools in Indiana
