= Washington Township Middle-High School =

Location
- 381 East SR 2 Valparaiso, Indiana 46383; United States
- 41.484440°N 86.994613°W

Information
- Type: Public
- School district: East Porter County School Corporation
- Principal: Christopher Fields
- Faculty: 30.50 FTE
- Grades: 6–12
- Enrollment: 433 (2023-24)
- Color
- Athletics conference: Porter County Conference
- Team name: Senators
- Website: wmhs.eastporter.k12.in.us

Washington Township Middle-High School is a public high school and middle school located in Washington Township, just east of Valparaiso, Indiana.

== See also ==
- List of high schools in Indiana
