= Greenwood Christian Academy =

- GCA

Location
- 835 West Worthsville Road; Greenwood, Indiana 46143; United States
- Coordinates: 39.584135°N 86.122731°W

Information
- Type: Private school
- Established: 1998
- Principal: Jordan Johnson, Sean Branch, Angelique Randall
- Head of school: Kevin Jackson
- Grades: PreK-12th grade
- Enrollment: 818 (2023-2024)
- Color
- Athletics conference: Pioneer
- Mascot: Cougars
- Affiliation: Christian
- Website: Official Website

Greenwood Christian Academy is a private Christian school with grades PreK through high school located in Greenwood, Indiana. Currently, more than 800 students are enrolled at the school's two campuses.

== Divisions ==
PreK: 4-year-olds Elementary School: Kindergarten - 4th Grade Middle School: 5th-8th Grade High School: 9th-12th Grade

== Accreditation ==
GCA is fully accredited by the Indiana Department of Education (IDOE) and the Association of Christian Schools International (ACSI).

== History ==
In the early 1990s, a group of Greenwood-area parents approached the Community Church of Greenwood (CCG) and asked that the church consider starting a Christian school in the community. CCG's Pastor Dr. Charles Lake commissioned a team to investigate the possibility, and the team concluded that such a school would be viable but should operate independently of a single church. The team added leaders of other local churches, continued pursuing God's leading, formed Greenwood Christian Academy (GCA), and opened its doors on Madison Avenue in the fall of 1998. Two years later, GCA opened a second campus for elementary students within the CCG facility. In 2007, GCA combined its elementary and secondary schools into one building on Worthsville Road.

== Facility Changes ==
In April 2021, GCA announced that it would be moving its high school to the former Gathering Place facility beginning in the 2021/22 school year. Greenwood Christian Academy High School is located at 1495 West Main Street in Greenwood, and the PreK-8th Grade campus is located at 835 West Worthsville Road in Greenwood.

== Athletics ==
GCA is a member of the Indiana High School Athletic Association (IHSAA) as a Class 1A school and offers volleyball, soccer, golf, cross country, basketball, cheerleading, swimming, track, tennis, softball, and baseball at the varsity level. Middle school students can participate in volleyball, soccer, cross country, basketball, cheerleading, track, softball, baseball and golf. In Fall 2022, GCA launched a varsity football program for the first time in school history.

== Fine Arts ==
Academic offerings in the arts include studio art, fiber art, band, chapel band, choir, drama and tech theatre. Middle school and high school students present multiple musicals and productions each year.

== See also ==
- List of high schools in Indiana
