= IHSAA Conference-Independent Schools =

Members of the Indiana High School Athletic Association

The schools listed below are members of the Indiana High School Athletic Association and are not members of a conference. Of these, several were at one time members of a conference but became independent because of budget and travel concerns. However, some of them, mostly private schools, are also independent in order to better prepare for the state tournament, a practice that the IHSAA has begun to crack down on in recent years.

== Indiana's class system ==
Indiana's classes are determined by skill level, broken into categories of roughly equal skill depending on the sport. The 2011–12 school year marks a change in the classification period, as schools are reclassified in all class sports biennially instead of quadrennially.

It is also important to note that some schools (mostly private) are placed in classes higher than their enrollment. This is due to a new IHSAA rule that took effect for the 2012–13 year that dictates that a school that has made two appearances at the state championships in a row, win or lose, is automatically moved up into the next class. These 58 schools are independent members of the IHSAA.

School	City	Mascot	Colors	Enrollment 2023–24	IHSAA Class	IHSAA Football Class	County
21st Century Academy	Gary	Cougars		408	A	--	45; Lake
Believe Circle City	Indianapolis	Cyclones		80	A	--	49; Marion
Bowman; Academy	Gary	Eagles		277	AA	AA	45; Lake
Carmel	Carmel	Greyhounds		5200	AAAA	AAAAAA	29; Hamilton
Center Grove	Greenwood	Trojans		2893	AAAA	AAAAAA	41; Johnson
Christian Academy of Indiana	New Albany	Warriors		295	A	--	22; Floyd
Clarksville	Clarksville	Generals		385	AA	AA	10; Clark
Culver; Academies	Culver	Eagles		832	AAA	AAAA	50; Marshall
Dugger Union	Dugger	Bulldogs		200	A	--	77; Sullivan
Evansville Christian	Evansville	Eagles		235	A	--	82; Vanderburgh
Evansville; Day School	Evansville	Eagles		81	A		82; Vanderburgh
Fort Wayne; Blackhawk	Fort Wayne	Braves		270	A	A	02; Allen
GEO Next Generation	Indianapolis	Eagles		204	A	--	49; Marion
Hammond; Science & Tech	Hammond	Hawks		291	A	--	45; Lake
Indiana School for the Blind	Indianapolis	Rockets		57	A	--	49; Marion
Indiana School for the Deaf	Indianapolis	Orioles		81	A	A	49; Marion
Indianapolis; Cathedral	Indianapolis	Fighting Irish		1,172	AAAA	AAAAAA	49; Marion
Indianapolis; Rooted School	Indianapolis	Royals		105	A	--	49; Marion
KIPP Indy Legacy	Indianapolis	The Pride		331	A	--	49; Marion
Lakewood Park; Christian	Auburn	Panthers		181	A	--	17; DeKalb
Lapel	Lapel	Bulldogs		466	AA	AA	48; Madison
Lighthouse CPA	Gary	Lions		560	AA	--	45; Lake
Madison	Madison	Cubs		760	AAA	AAAA	39; Jefferson
Marquette Catholic	Michigan City	Blazers		223	A	--	46; LaPorte
MTI School of Knowledge	Indianapolis	Phoenix		113	A	--	49; Marion
Oldenburg; Academy	Oldenburg	Twisters		151	A	A	24; Franklin
Providence	Clarksville	Pioneers		371	AA	AA	10; Clark
Providence; Cristo Rey	Indianapolis	Wolves		237	A	--	49; Marion
Purdue Polytechnic; Broad Ripple	Indianapolis	Lynx		262	A	--	49; Marion
Rock Creek; Academy	Sellersburg	Lions		177	A	A	10; Clark
St. Thomas More	South Bend	Griffins		47	A	--	10; St. Joseph
Signature	Evansville	Penguins		361	AA	--	82; Vanderburgh
Smith Academy	Fort Wayne	Fighting 54th		32	A	--	02; Allen
Traders Point; Christian	Whitestown	Knights		54	A	--	06; Boone
Trinity Lutheran	Seymour	Cougars		166	A	A	36; Jackson

=== Defunct independent schools ===
These are schools that were independent at the time of their closing. This list is incomplete.

School	City	Mascot	Colors	County	Year closed	Reason for Closing
Muncie; Southside	Muncie	Rebels		18; Delaware	2014	consolidated into Muncie Central
New; Harmony	New Harmony	Rappites		65; Posey	2012	consolidated into North Posey

== Independent football members ==
These schools are independent in football, but play other sports within a conference.

School	City	Mascot	Colors	Enrollment	IHSAA Football Class	Primary Conference	County
Anderson Prep	Anderson	Jets		309	A	Pioneer	48; Madison
Indianapolis Shortridge	Indianapolis	Blue Devils		1,159	AAAA	Pioneer	
Linton-Stockton	Linton	Miners		387	AA		
Tecumseh	Lynnville	Braves		286	A	Pocket	

== Resources ==
- Conference Alignments
- IHSAA 2009-10 Roster
