= East Porter County School Corporation =

School district in Indiana

Location
- Kouts, Indiana; United States

District information
- Type: Public
- Established: 1994
- Superintendent: Dr. Reid Amones

Other information
- Website: www.eastporter.k12.in.us

The East Porter County School Corporation is a school district in the northwest part of the U.S. State of Indiana that serves Pleasant Township, Morgan Township, and Washington Township. Kouts, located in Pleasant Township, is the only town in the district, though the district also includes parts of the city of Valparaiso that extend into Washington Township.

== Schools ==
- Kouts Middle/High School (Mustangs)
- Kouts Elementary School
- Morgan Township Middle/High School (Cherokees)
- Morgan Township Elementary School
- Washington Township Middle/High School (Senators)
- Washington Township Elementary School

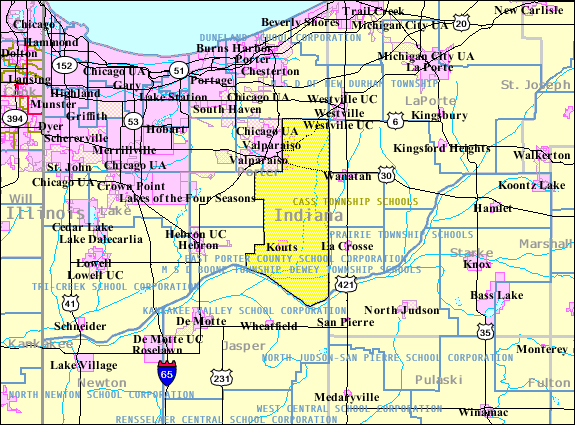
