= Washington Township, Porter County, Indiana =

Washington Township
- Township
- Coordinates: 41°28′45″N 86°58′59″W
- Country: United States
- State: Indiana
- County: Porter

Government
  - Type: Indiana township

Area
  - Total: 29.49 sq mi (76.39 km^{2})
  - Land: 29.49 sq mi (76.39 km^{2})
  - Water: 0 sq mi (0 km^{2})
- Elevation: 771 ft (235 m)

Population (2020)
  - Total: 5,799
  - Density: 162.2/sq mi (62.64/km^{2})
- Time zone: UTC-6 (Central (CST))
  - Summer (DST): UTC-5 (CDT)
- Area code: 219
- FIPS code: 18-80954
- GNIS feature ID: 454014

Washington Township is one of twelve townships in Porter County, Indiana. As of the 2010 census, its population was 4,785.

Historical population
Census	Pop.	Note	%±
1890	670		—
1900	556		−17.0%
1910	610		9.7%
1920	621		1.8%
1930	632		1.8%
1940	692		9.5%
1950	813		17.5%
1960	1,066		31.1%
1970	1,226		15.0%
1980	2,424		97.7%
1990	3,113		28.4%
2000	3,425		10.0%
2010	4,785		39.7%
2020	5,799		21.2%

== History ==
Settlers were present as early as 1834 in what was the unincorporated village of Coburg. A post office was established at Coburg in 1876, and remained in operation until it was discontinued in 1906. The community was named after Cobourg, Ontario, the native home of an early settler. Coburg was a station and shipping point on the railroad. Washington Township was organized in 1836.

== Cities and towns ==
No cities or towns are located in Washington Township, but eastern portions of the city of Valparaiso extend into the township.

== Education ==
Washington Township is served by the East Porter County School Corporation. Their high school is Washington Township Middle-High School, located on State Route 2, east of Valparaiso.

Victory Christian Academy, which serves students in grades Pre-K through 12, is located in the township.
