= Malden, Indiana =

- Unincorporated community and Census-designated place
- Location within Indiana Location within the United States
- Coordinates: 41°22′30″N 87°01′43″W
- Country: United States
- State: Indiana
- County: Porter
- Township: Morgan
- Founded: 1909
- Elevation: 712 ft (217 m)
- Time zone: UTC-6 (Central (CST))
  - Summer (DST): UTC-5 (CDT)
- ZIP code: 46383
- Area code: 219
- GNIS feature ID: 2830499

Malden is an unincorporated community in Morgan Township, Porter County, in the U.S. state of Indiana. The town is locally well known for its Labor Day parade, usually having a large turn-out despite the town's small size.

== History ==
Malden was platted in 1909. The community was named after Malden, Massachusetts. Malden once contained a post office under the name Liberty View. This post office operated from 1910 until 1913.

== Geography ==
Malden is a small unincorporated community with a bar, the Malden Oasis, and New Hope Missionary Church. Across the street is a grain elevator, the Co-op. In between the bar and the church lies a street which has houses on it. By that street there is a historical school house that is still visible from Highway Forty-Nine.

== Demographics ==
The United States Census Bureau delineated Malden as a census designated place in the 2022 American Community Survey.
