= Shults-Lewis Child & Family Services =

Location
- 150 East 325 South; Valparaiso, Porter County, Indiana 46384; United States
- Coordinates: 41.387118°N 87.028320°W

Information
- Type: Private school
- Established: 1948
- Principal: Michael Zandstra
- Faculty: 3
- Grades: 7-12
- Enrollment: 5 (2021-2022)
- Website: Official Website

Shults-Lewis Child & Family Services is a private school and youth counseling facility located in Valparaiso, Indiana, USA. It was founded in 1948 as Shults-Lewis Children's Home, a residential school. It admitted its first students in 1956.

== See also ==
- List of high schools in Indiana
