= The King's Academy (Indiana) =

Location
- 1201 South Water Street; Jonesboro, Grant County, Indiana 46938; United States
- 40.473645°N 85.625284°W

Information
- Type: Private school
- Established: 1995
- Principal: Interim
- Faculty: 19
- Grades: K-12
- Enrollment: 160
- Colors: blue and gold
- Team name: Knights
- Website: www.kingsacademy.org

The King's Academy is a private, kindergarten through high school located in Jonesboro, Indiana.

== See also ==
- List of high schools in Indiana
