= University High School of Indiana =

Private preparatory school in Indiana, US

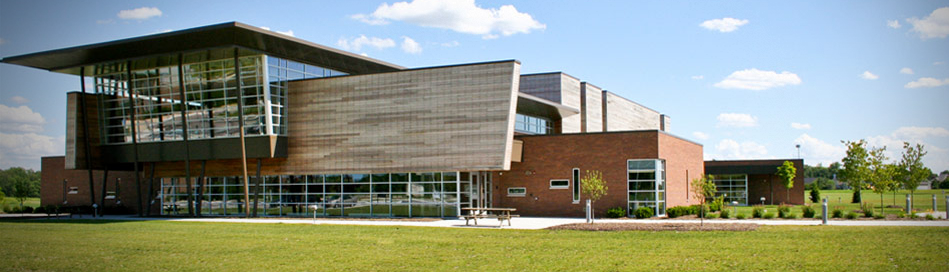
- University High School's Fairbanks Building

Location
- 2825 W. 116th Street; Carmel, Hamilton County, Indiana 46032; United States; 39°57′15.5″N 86°12′38″W

Information
- Type: Private
- Established: 2000
- CEEB code: 150448
- Staff: 61
- Grades: 9-12
- Hours in school day: 8:30 a.m. - 3:15 p.m.
- Color
- Athletics conference: Pioneer Conference
- Mascot: Hank the Pug
- Website: universityhighschool.org

The University High School of Indiana is a private high school in Carmel, Indiana, United States.

== See also ==
- List of high schools in Indiana
