= North Harrison High School =

Location
- 1070 Highway 64 Northwest; Ramsey, Harrison County, Indiana 47112; United States; 38°19′19″N 86°08′39″W

Information
- Type: Public high school
- Established: 1969
- School district: North Harrison Community School Corporation
- Principal: Matthew Kellems
- Faculty: 32.00 (FTE)
- Grades: 9-12
- Enrollment: 630 (2023-2024)
- Student to teacher ratio: 19.69
- Color
- Athletics conference: Mid-Southern Conference
- Team name: Cougars
- Rival: Corydon Central High School
- Website: Official Site

North Harrison High School is a public high school located in Ramsey, Indiana, United States.

== See also ==
- List of high schools in Indiana
