= Tabernacle Christian School (Indiana) =

Location
- 2189 Burton Lane; Martinsville, Morgan County, Indiana 46151; United States
- Coordinates: 39.406179°N 86.435444°W

Information
- Type: Private Christian
- Faculty: 17
- Grades: PreK-12
- Enrollment: 414 (2023-2024)
- Color
- Team name: Eagles
- Website: Official Website

Tabernacle Christian School is a private Christian school located in Martinsville, Indiana, a town of approximately 12,000 people in the Indianapolis metropolitan area. It is operated by the Martinsville Baptist Tabernacle, a local Baptist church.

== Academics ==
All instruction is required by the Martinsville Baptist Tabernacle bylaws be in agreement with the Statement of Faith. This includes a proclamation of belief in young-Earth creationism. The bylaws also include this statement:

All educational programs or courses of instruction shall be conducted consistent with the teaching of the inerrant word of God. Any assertion or belief that conflicts with or questions a Bible truth is a pagan deception and distortion of the truth which will be disclaimed as false. It is the responsibility of every instructor or teacher to present the inerrant word of God as the sole infallible source of knowledge and wisdom.

== See also ==
- List of high schools in Indiana
