= Pioneer Conference (Indiana) =

High school athletic conference in Indiana, U.S.

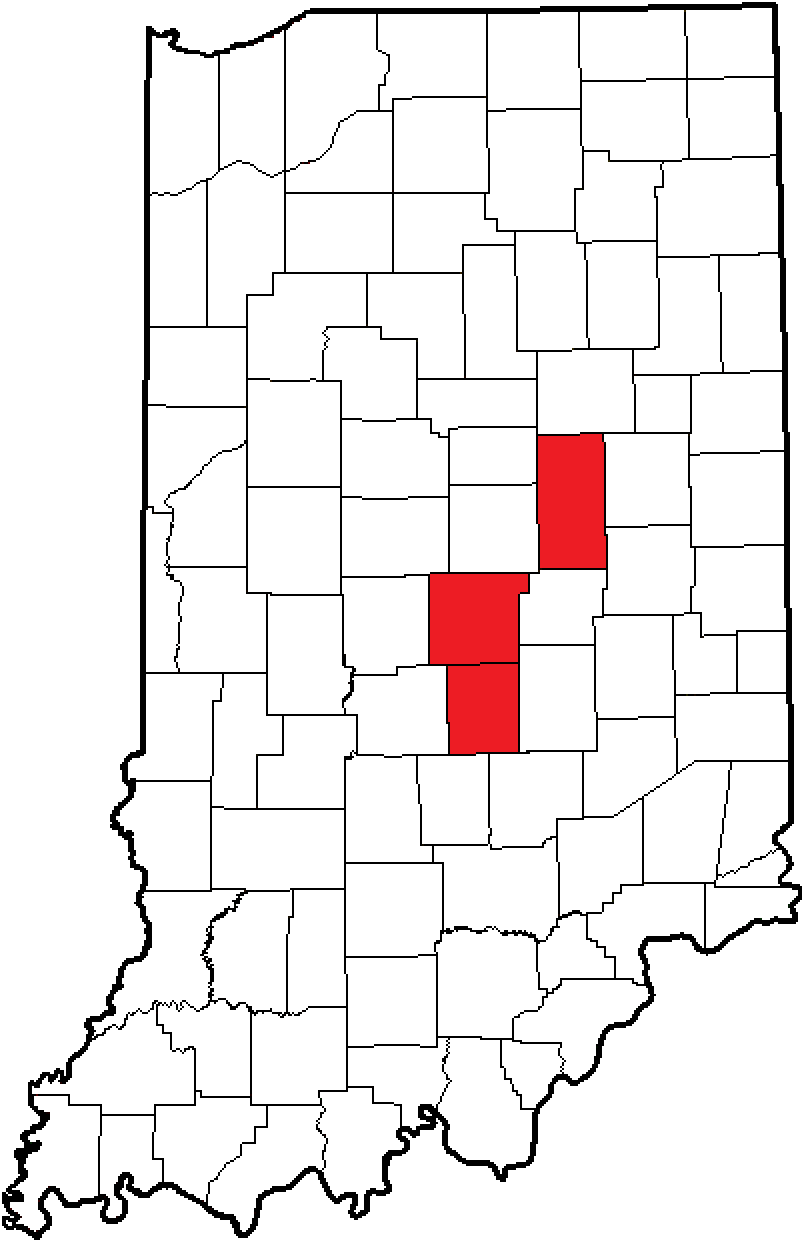
The Pioneer Conference in Indiana

The Pioneer Conference is an IHSAA-sanctioned athletic conference formed in 2009. It is made up of ten small private, military, laboratory, and/or charter schools from Delaware, Hamilton, Johnson, Madison, Marion, and Wayne counties. All schools are Class 1A or 2A IHSAA members, aside from the much larger Indianapolis Shortridge Charter School, which is a 4A member.

== Members ==
School	Location	Mascot	Colors	County	Size 20–21	IHSAA Class	Year joined	Previous conference affiliation
Anderson Prep	Anderson	Jets		48; Madison	241	A	2015	Independents
Bethesda Christian	Brownsburg	Patriots		31; Hendricks	107	A	2018	Independents
Herron	Indianapolis	Achaeans		49; Marion	998	AAA	2025	Independents
Indianapolis; Shortridge	Indianapolis	Blue Devils		49; Marion	1,025	AAA	2010	none (reopened 2009)
International	Indianapolis	Gryphons		49; Marion	138	A	2009	Independent
Liberty Christian	Anderson	Lions		48; Madison	126	A	2009	Independent
Muncie Burris	Muncie	Owls		18; Delaware	423	AA	2015	Independents (MEC 2014)
Indianapolis; Park Tudor	Indianapolis	Panthers		49; Marion	378	AA	2019	Indiana Crossroads
Seton Catholic	Richmond	Cardinals		89; Wayne	78	A	2015	Independents
University	Carmel	Trailblazers		29; Hamilton	343	AA	2015	Independents

=== Former members ===
School	City	Mascot	Colors	County	Year joined	Previous conference	Year left	Conference joined
Indianapolis; Crispus Attucks	Indianapolis	Tigers		49; Marion	2009	Indianapolis	2018	Independents
Central Christian	Indianapolis	Chargers		49; Marion	2009	Central Indiana; Christian Conference	2021	Greater Indianapolis
Greenwood Christian	Greenwood	Cougars		41; Johnson	2009		2025	Indiana Crossroads

== History ==
The conference was formed in 2009, with four Indianapolis-area private schools (Baptist, Greenwood Christian, International, Liberty Christian) joining with recently reopened IPS school Attucks, whose medical focus causes the school to be smaller than its public counterparts. The 2010–11 school year also brought another small IPS school into the fold, Shortridge. The Conference expanded outside of the immediate Indianapolis area in 2015, adding three Independent schools (Anderson Prep, Seton Catholic, and University), as well as Muncie Burris, who had been voted out of the Mid-Eastern Conference the year before. Indianapolis Attucks left in 2018, and was replaced by Bethesda Christian. Park Tudor would also join the conference in 2019. In 2025 Herron joined the conference as its 10th member.

== Conference championships ==
=== Boys basketball ===
#	Team	Seasons
3	Greenwood Christian	2011, 2012, 2014*
2	Attucks	2015, 2017
2	Liberty Christian	2013*, 2016
2	Shortridge	2013*, 2014*
1	Baptist	2010
4	University	2018, 2019, 2020, 2021
0	Anderson Prep	
0	Burris	
0	International	
0	Seton Catholic	

=== Girls basketball ===
#	Team	Seasons				
4	Attucks	2011, 2015, 2016, 2017 (W)				
3	Shortridge	2012, 2013, 2014				
2	Greenwood Christian	2010 2021				
1	Liberty Christian	2017 (E)				
0	Baptist					
0	International					
0	Anderson Prep					
0	Burris					
0	Seton Catholic					
2	University	2019 2020	-	1	Bethesda Christian	2018

=== Baseball ===
#	Team	Seasons
1	Greenwood Christian	2016*
1	Seton Catholic	2016*
3	University	2016* 2018 2019
1	Liberty Christian	2017
1	Park Tudor	2021

=== Boys' Tennis ===
#	Team	Seasons
2	University	2016, 2025
0	Shortridge	
0	Baptist	
0	Liberty Christian	
0	Attucks	
0	International	

== All-Conference Teams ==
=== Baseball ===
2016

Name	Class	School
Tristan Williams	Fr.	Anderson Prep
Krae Sparks	Sr.	Greenwood Christian
Joel Stinnett	So.	Greenwood Christian
Nate Weems	Sr.	Greenwood Christian
Isaiah Brees	So.	Liberty Christian
Peyton Quinn	Jr.	Liberty Christian
Matt Armstrong	Sr.	Muncie Burris
Cliff Dickman	Sr.	Seton Catholic
Nick Matthews		Seton Catholic
Vince Mosey	Jr.	Seton Catholic
Colten Pippenger	Sr.	Seton Catholic
Hudson Bebo	So.	University
Dawson Estep	Fr.	University
John Lawicki	Jr.	University
Zach Nerney	Sr.	University
