= Faith Christian School (Indiana) =

Location
- 5526 State Road 26 E Lafayette, Tippecanoe County, Indiana 47905; United States; 40.417748°N 86.798667°W

Information
- Denomination: Baptist
- Established: 1997
- CEEB code: 151908
- Faculty: 36
- Grades: Prekindergarten-12
- Gender: Coed
- Enrollment: 765 (2023-2024)
- Hours in school day: 7.4
- Colors: Maroon and Gold
- Athletics conference: Independent
- Team name: Eagles
- Accreditation: American Association of Christian Schools; Indiana Department of Education
- Website: Faith Christian School

Faith Christian School is a private, coeducational pre-K-12 Christian day school located in facilities provided by Faith Church of Lafayette, Indiana.

== History ==
Faith Christian School was founded by members of Faith Baptist Church and opened in 1997 with 48 students in grades 9–12. Seventh and eighth grades were added for the 1998–1999 school year and PK3-sixth grades were added for 2000–2001. Kossuth Street Baptist Church's Highland Christian School merged with Faith Christian School in August 2002.

Faith Christian School has been accredited by the American Association of Christian Schools since February 2001 as well as the Indiana Department of Education (Freeway School) since February 2004. Faith Christian School is also approved by Homeland Security to issue I-20 documents to qualified international students allowing them to obtain F-1 visas from the US Consulate in their country.

== Extracurricular activities ==
Faith Christian School offers band, computer programming, choir, drawing, home economics, drama, photography, film production, and yearbook as courses, and qualified eleventh and twelfth-grade students may participate in the American Christian Honor Society.

The school fields teams in baseball, basketball, cheerleading, cross country, golf, wrestling, soccer, softball, tennis, track, volleyball, and robotics.

== Schedule ==
The High School schedule is based on a block system with five periods each day, with separate schedules for each Maroon and Gold days. The first and last periods last approximately 60 minutes, with the second, third, and fourth about 90 minutes.

== Curriculum ==
High school students must complete 56 credits to graduate with either a Core 40 or Advanced Honor diploma. The Advanced Honor diploma has more rigorous math, science and foreign language requirements and requires a minimum GPA of 3.0.

The School provides nine Advanced Placement and dual enrollment options, including: AP U.S. History, AP English, AP Chemistry, and AP Calculus AB.

== See also ==
- List of high schools in Indiana
