= Ramsey, Indiana =

Unincorporated community in Indiana, United States

- Census-designated place
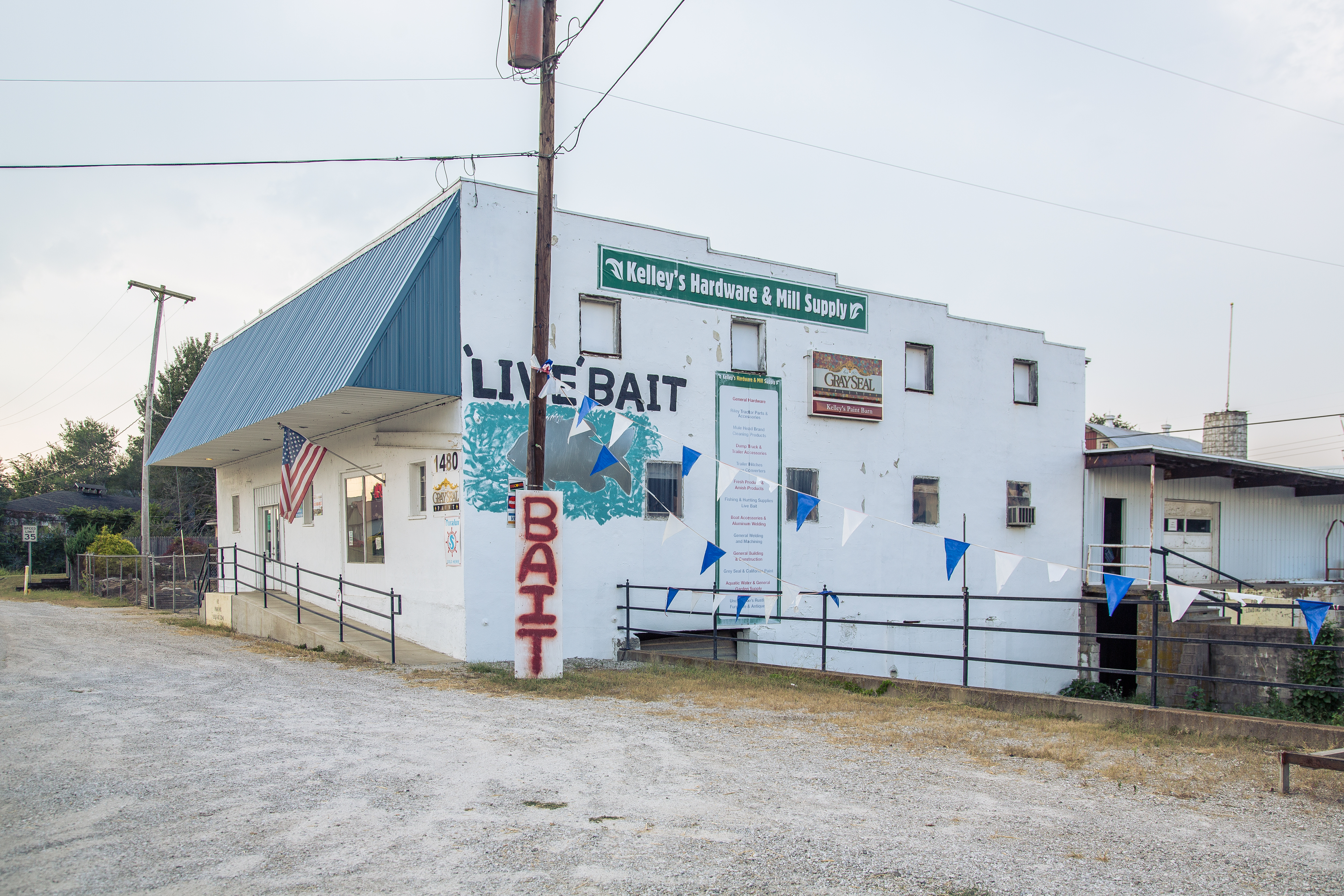

- Harrison County's location in Indiana

- Ramsey's location in Harrison County
- Coordinates: 38°19′18″N 86°09′20″W
- Country: United States
- State: Indiana
- County: Harrison
- Township: Jackson
- Elevation: 709 ft (216 m)
- ZIP code: 47166
- FIPS code: 18-62892
- GNIS feature ID: 2830405

Ramsey is a Census-designated place in Jackson Township, Harrison County, in the U.S. state of Indiana.

It is the location of North Harrison High School.

== History ==
Platted on March 14, 1883, Ramsey was originally known as Jackson City. It was laid out by Howard Ramsey alongside the Louisville, Evansville and St. Louis Railroad (now known as Norfolk Southern Railway).

The Ramsey post office was established in 1884.

== Demographics ==
The United States Census Bureau defined Ramsey as a census designated place in the 2022 American Community Survey.
