= Christian Academy of Madison =

Private school in Madison, Indiana, United States

Location
- Madison, Indiana; United States
- 38.784881°N 85.395967°W

Information
- Type: Private
- Religious affiliation: Protestant Christian
- Established: 2007
- Administrator: Joel Whitice
- Faculty: 11
- Enrollment: 161 (2023-2024)
- Student to teacher ratio: 10:1
- Athletics: Archery, Running Club, Girls and Boys Elementary and High school Basketball, Girls Volleyball, Boys and Girls Cross Country, Cheerleading
- Website: Official site

Christian Academy of Madison is a private, non-denominational Christian school.

== Academic Standards ==
Students study from the A Beka curriculum, highlights of the curriculum include:

- Reading, cursive writing, and phonics beginning in the 3-year old kindergarten program
- Opportunities for activities such as computer-training, art, physical education, music, Latin, Drama, and hands-on science experimentation.

== History ==
Christian Academy of Madison, was founded in 2007. The school was modeled after its sister school, Christian Academy of Carrollton, Kentucky, as well as schools in the Christian Academy of Louisville School System.

CAM's facility, originally the Wingham Paving Company, consists of two buildings: one for lower elementary, and one for middle and high schools. The original building was renovated to house offices, a computer/assembly room, and one class room; the back wing of the building was added for five classrooms and additional restrooms. An addition to the classroom wing in 2009 added seven new classrooms, allowing grades to be split up into their individual levels to meet enrollment growth and to begin to add high school grades. As the school has grown one grade has been added each year and they are now able to serve 3 year old kindergarten through 12th grade.

In September 2011, the school began accepting "Indiana Choice Scholarship Program" vouchers.

== School Sponsorship and Affiliation ==
Christian Academy of Madison is independent in its ownership and is a member of the following associations:

- Association of Christian Schools International
- Indiana Non-Public Education Association

The school is accredited by the State of Indiana, obtaining Freeway Status through the Indiana Department of Education in 2009.
