= Cannelton City Schools =

Public high school in Indiana, United States

Cannelton Elementary and High School

Location
- 109 3rd St. Cannelton, Perry County, Indiana 47520; United States
- 37.910469°N 86.743919°W

Information
- Type: public PK-12 school
- Established: 1922
- School district: Cannelton City Schools
- Principal: Fisher Roger
- Teaching staff: 20.00 (FTE)
- Grades: PreK-12
- Enrollment: 197 (2023-2024)
- Student to teacher ratio: 9.85
- Color
- Athletics conference: Southern Roads
- Team name: Bulldogs
- Website: Cannelton School District

Cannelton City Schools is a school district headquartered in Cannelton, Indiana.

It occupies a part of Troy Township in Perry County, and includes Cannelton. It operates a single PK-12 school, Cannelton Elementary & High School. The school has the following facilities: William Bennett Early Learning Center, Myers Grade School, and Cannelton Jr.-Sr. High School.

As of 2015 it is the smallest school district in the State of Indiana.

The Cannelton senior high school program is the second smallest public high school program in the state of Indiana. A building built in 1922 serves as the Jr/Sr high school building. It functions as one of three high school programs in Perry County, Indiana.

== History ==
In 2014, the superintendent, Al Sibbitt, stated that the school district community has shown no interest in consolidating into the Tell City-Troy Township School Corporation.

== Academics ==
In 2015, Seth Slabaugh of The Star Press wrote that the district had "a pattern of earning bad grades from the state department of education."

== Athletics ==
The Cannelton Bulldogs compete in Volleyball, Basketball, Track, Boys Cross Country, Baseball, and Softball.

In 2025, the high school basketball team had five players. As of that year, there is a softball team, though for a period of years prior it had been disbanded.

== See also ==
- List of high schools in Indiana
