= Bethesda Christian School (Fort Worth, Texas) =

Location
- 4700 North Beach St. Fort Worth, Texas 76137; USA
- 32.831°N 97.289°W

Information
- Established: 1980
- Teaching staff: 38.0 (FTE)
- Grades: K–12
- Enrollment: 324 (2019–20)
- Student to teacher ratio: 8.5
- Colors: Blue and Gold
- Mascot: Lion
- Affiliation: Assemblies of God
- Website: www.bethesdachristianschool.org

Bethesda Christian School is a private preschool-12 Christian school located in Fort Worth, Texas. Bethesda Christian School started in 1980.

The school started as a daycare known as the Wisdom Day Care in 1977. In 1980, Bethesda Christian School opened its doors with a single Kindergarten class.
