= Faith Christian School (Virginia) =

Private school in Virginia, United States

Coordinates: 37°12′57.7″N 80°1′8.8″W

Information
- Established: 1997; 29 years ago
- Accreditation: Association of Classical Christian Schools
- Website: www.fcsva.com

Faith Christian School is a private classical Christian school in Roanoke, Virginia. It was founded in 1997 as an upper school and expanded to include an elementary school in 2004 and a pre-kindergarten in 2014. In August 2007 Faith Christian moved into their building on Buck Mountain Road. It is accredited by the Association of Classical Christian Schools.
