= Faith Christian School (Rocky Mount, North Carolina) =

American Christian private school in North Carolina

Location
- 1333 Faith Christian Drive; Rocky Mount, North Carolina 27803; United States
- Coordinates: 35°55′46″N 77°50′36″W

Information
- School type: Private
- Religious affiliation(s): Christian
- Head of school: Erik Harris
- Teaching staff: 29.3 (on an FTE basis)
- Grades: PK-12
- Enrollment: 387 Inc. 13 PK students (2017-18)
- Student to teacher ratio: 12 8
- Website: www.fcspatriots.com

Faith Christian School is a private Christian school located in Rocky Mount, North Carolina.
