= William Merritt Chase Alternative School =

- William Merritt Chase Alternative School logo

Location
- Gary, Indiana; United States; 41.598026°N 87.374967°W

Information
- Type: Public
- Established: 1993
- Principal: Lloyd Booth
- Faculty: 20 (approximate)
- Enrollment: 105 (approximate)
- Website: Official website at the Wayback Machine (archived 2007-03-14)

William Merritt Chase Alternative School was a six-year (7–12) alternative school of the Gary Community School Corporation in Gary, Indiana, United States, opening in 1993 as an alternative middle school and closing in 2009. It occupied the former school building of Ambridge Elementary School from 1993 to 1996 and the former school building of Chase Elementary School from 1996 to 2009.

== History ==
The school was named after artist William Merritt Chase, and was founded to educate dropouts and at-risk students.

It was established in 1993 as Ambridge Alternative Middle School and was originally an alternative middle school serving the 6th through 8th grades. It was originally located at the site of the former Ambridge Elementary School. In 1996, it moved a short distance to the former site of the Chase Elementary School after that school closed.

In 2003 the Martin Luther King Jr. Academy moved its operations to the school. The Gary Community School Corporation closed the school in June 2009. It was one of seven Gary public schools closed in that year.

In 2020 the Chase school building was sold to a private buyer for $35,000.
