= Triton Jr/Sr High School =

Triton Junior–Senior High School
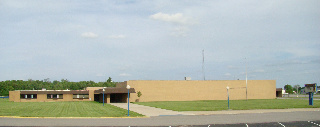

Location
- 300 Triton Drive; Bourbon, Indiana 46504; United States; 41°18′4″N 86°6′35″W

Information
- Other name: Tri-Township Junior-Senior High School
- School type: Public, Secondary School
- Motto: "Expect the best."
- Established: 1963
- School district: Triton School Corporation
- Superintendent: Jeremy Riffle
- NCES School ID: 181149001856
- Principal: Nathan McKeand
- Principal: Sarrah Arvesen
- Officer in charge: Steve Watkins
- Teaching staff: 31.50 (on a FTE basis)
- Grades: 7–12
- Enrollment: 414 (2024–2025)
- Student to teacher ratio: 13.14
- Language: English
- Hours in school day: 7 hours 10 minutes (8:05-3:15)
- Color: Blue & Gold
- Athletics conference: Hoosier North Athletic Conference
- Team name: Trojans
- Website: www.triton.k12.in.us/junior-senior-high

Triton Jr/Sr High School is a public secondary school in Bourbon, Indiana, just south of U.S. Highway 30 in the United States. It is a part of the Triton School Corporation. The school's current principals are Nate McKeand and Sarrah Arvesen. The Triton School Corporation, formed in 1963 to consolidate the schools of Bourbon, Etna Green, and Tippecanoe, is located in east central Marshall County, Indiana. It draws students from both east central Marshall and west central Kosciusko Counties. In 2019, the school was expanded, adding a new gymnasium named the "Triton Activities Center" (TAC).

The nearby Bourbon Community Building-Gymnasium was listed on the National Register of Historic Places in 2015 and removed from the register in 2021 as it was demolished.

== Demographics ==
The demographic breakdown of the 414 students enrolled at Triton Jr/Sr High in 2024–25 was:

- Male - 55.3%
- Female - 44.7%
- American Indian/Alaska Native - 0%
- Asian - 0.2%
- Black - 1.2%
- Hispanic - 7.0%
- White - 89.9%
- Native Hawaiian/Pacific Islander - 0%
- Multiracial - 1.7%

43.00% of the students were eligible for free or reduced cost lunch. Triton was a Title I school in 2015–2016.

== Athletics ==
Trojan Trench Gymnasium (2011)

The Triton Trojans compete in the Hoosier North Athletic Conference. The school colors are royal blue and gold. The following IHSAA sanctioned sports are offered:

- Baseball (boys)
  - State Champions - 2001
- Basketball (girls & boys)
  - Boys State Champions - 2008
  - Girls State Champion - 2000, 2001
- Cross Country (girls & boys)
- Football (boys)
- Golf (girls & boys)
- Softball (girls)
- Tennis (girls & boys)
- Track (girls & boys)
- Volleyball (girls)
- Wrestling (girls & boys)

== See also ==
- List of high schools in Indiana
