= Anderson Preparatory Academy =

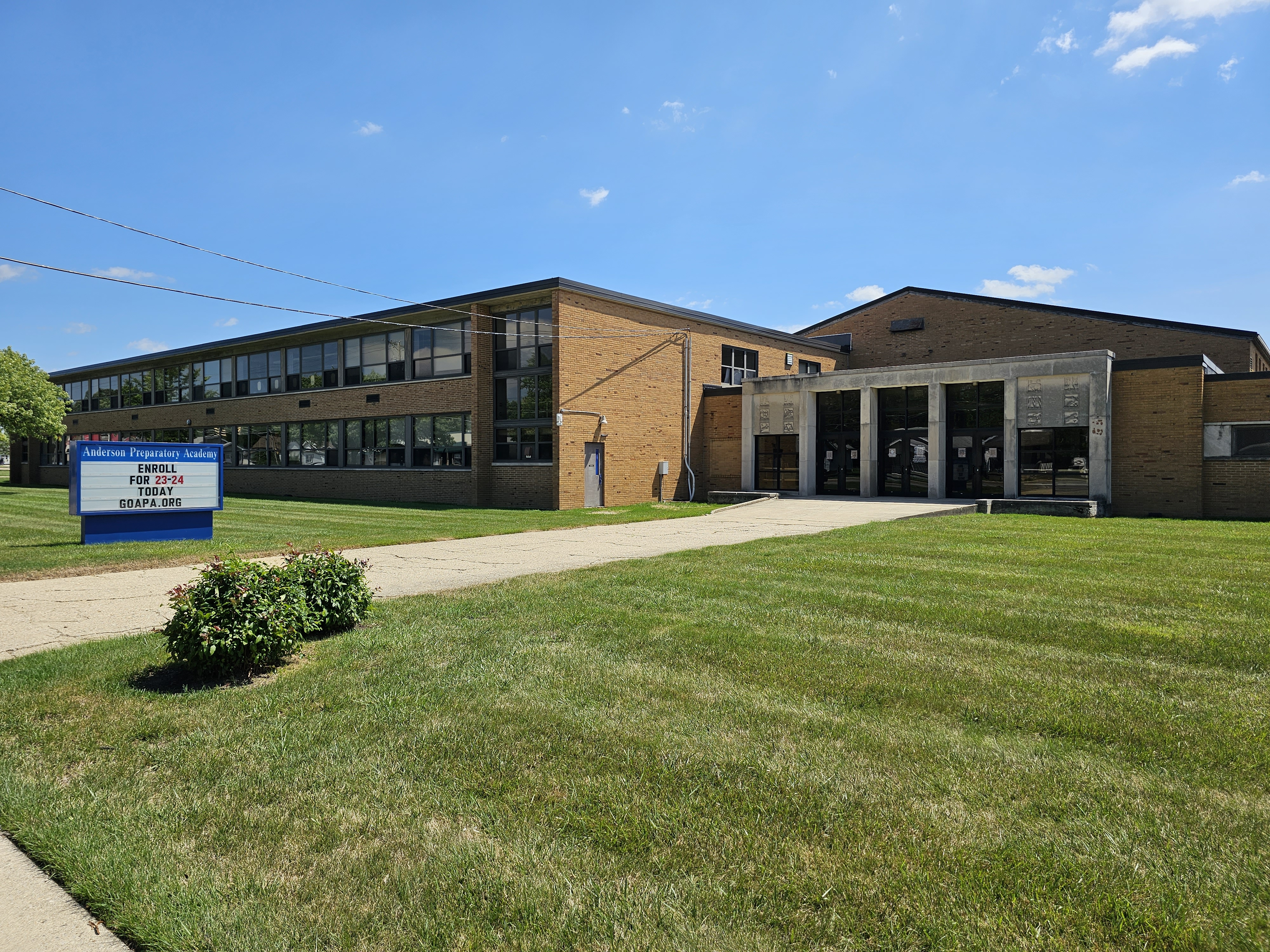
- The front of Anderson Preparatory Academy

Location
- 101 West 29th Street; Anderson, Madison County, Indiana 46016; United States; 40.095095°N 85.707435°W

Information
- Type: Public Charter Military Academy
- Motto: “Where Excellence is Expected”
- Established: August 4, 2008
- CEO / superintendent: Jill Barker
- Faculty: 65
- Teaching staff: 68.00 (FTE)
- Grades: K–12
- Enrollment: 843 (2023-2024)
- Student to teacher ratio: 12.40
- Color
- Athletics conference: Pioneer
- Team name: Jets
- Website: Official Website

Anderson Preparatory Academy (APA) is a public charter school in Anderson, Indiana, United States, authorized by Ball State University. The school is a coeducational, military-style academy for grades P–12 (ages 0–5 added fall 2026). Anderson Preparatory Academy started on August 4, 2009, with 839 students in grades 6 to 8 and added a grade each year after that, graduating its first senior class at the end of the 2013 school year, when it had 950 students and was one of 38 charter schools sponsored by Ball State. It is ranked 30 out of 40 charter schools in Indiana.

In 2011 Jill Barker succeeded Robert Guillaume as CEO of the school.

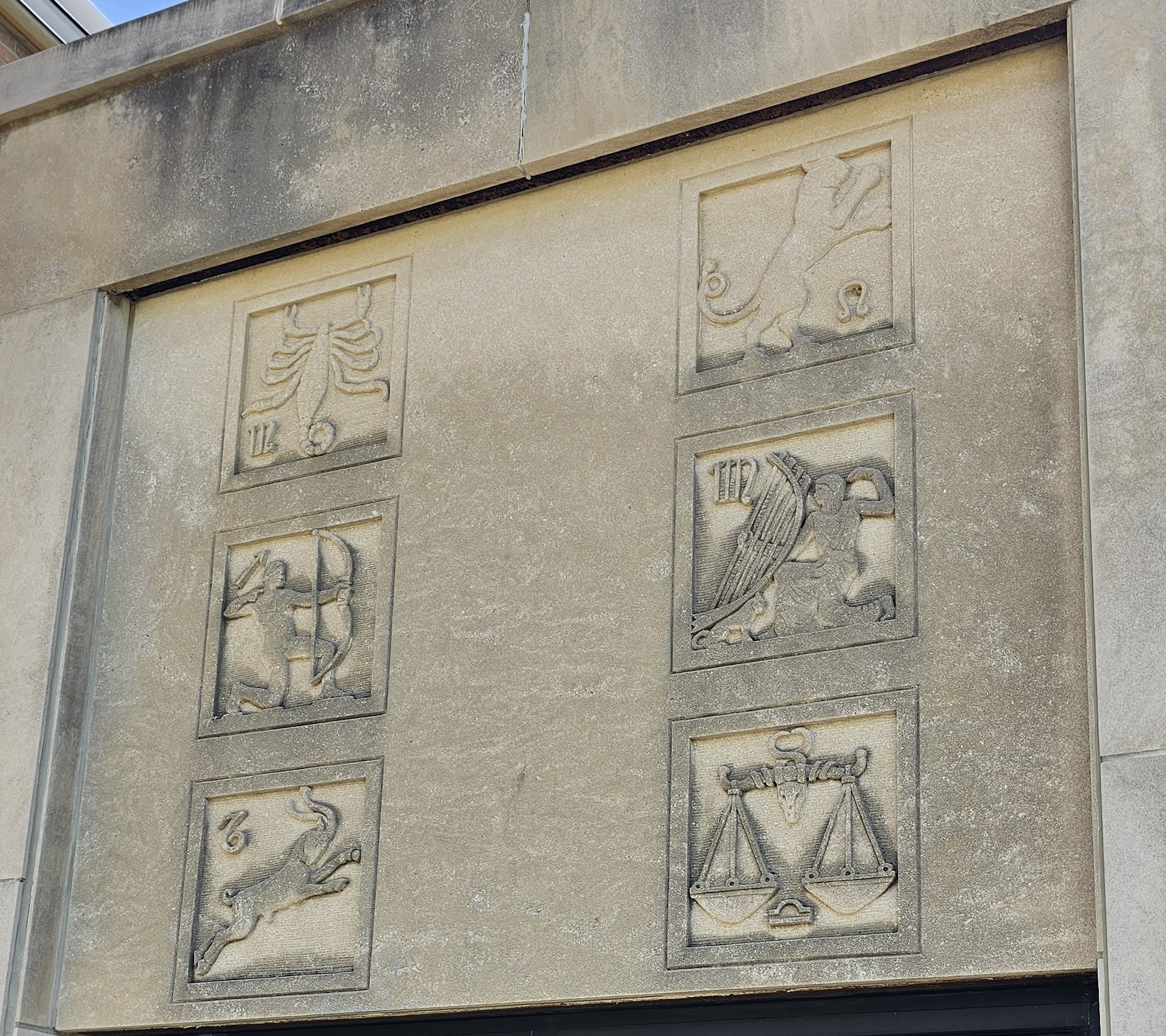
Limestone panel with carvings depicting 6 of the 12 zodiac symbols, to the left of the door of Anderson Preparatory Academy

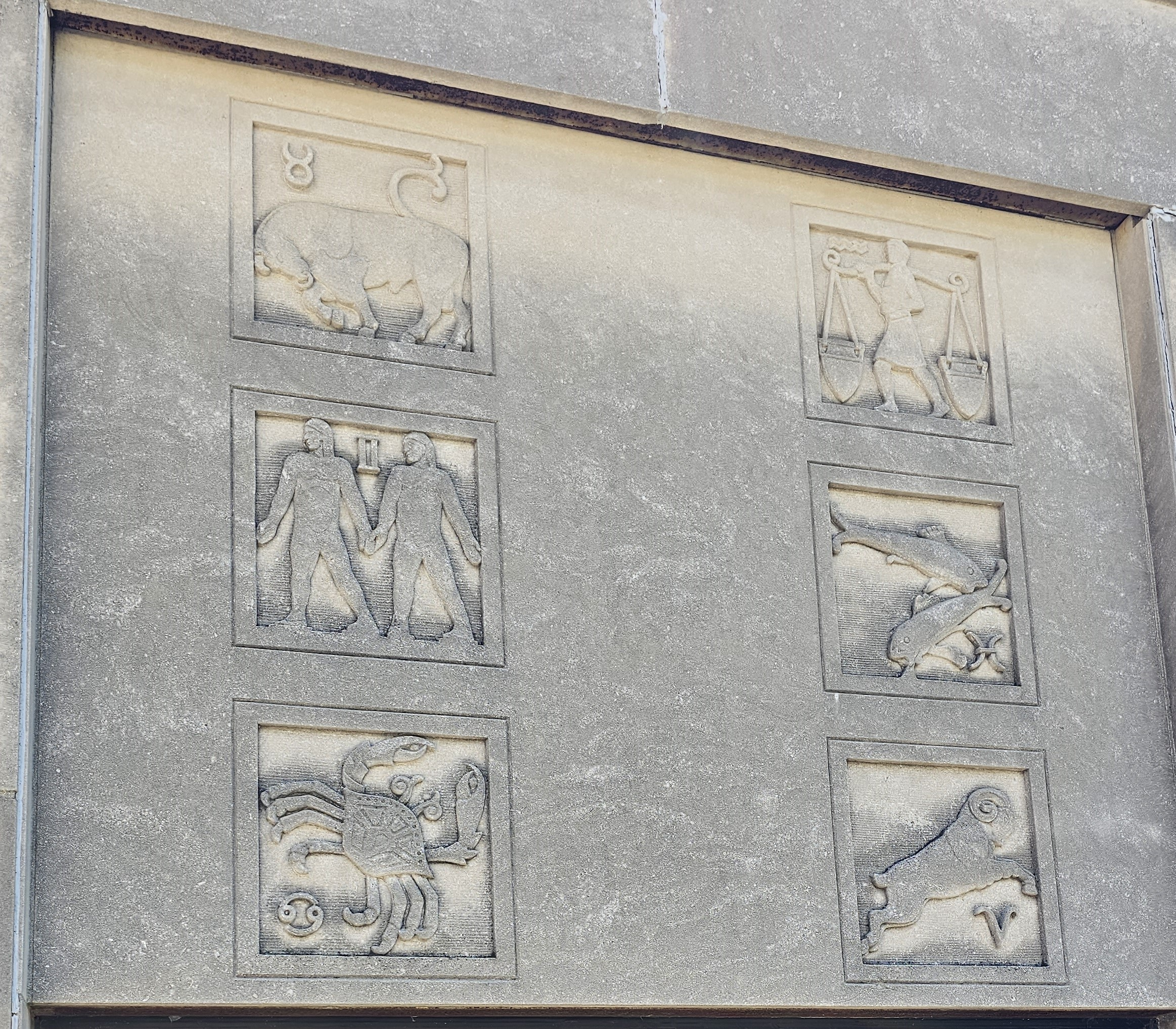
Limestone panel with carvings depicting 6 of the 12 zodiac symbols, to the right of the door of Anderson Preparatory Academy

== See also ==
- List of high schools in Indiana
