= Morgan Township Middle-High School =

Location
- 299 South SR 49; Valparaiso, Porter County, Indiana 46383; United States
- 41.392237°N 87.024691°W

Information
- Type: Public high school
- School district: East Porter County School Corporation
- Principal: Wes Bucher
- Teaching staff: 29.00 (FTE)
- Grades: 6-12
- Enrollment: 431 (2023-2024)
- Student to teacher ratio: 14.86
- Color
- Athletics conference: Porter County Conference
- Team name: Cherokees
- Website: Official Website

Morgan Township Middle-High School is a public high school located in Valparaiso, Indiana.

== See also ==
- List of high schools in Indiana
