= Bethesda Christian School (Brownsburg, Indiana) =

Location
- 7950 North County Road 650 East; Brownsburg, Hendricks County, Indiana 46112; United States; 39.8784°N 86.4116°W

Information
- Type: Private Christian
- Motto: Reaching Hearts, Teaching Minds
- Established: 1965
- Founder: Pastor Don Tyler
- Principal: Sara Campbell (Elementary School); Tammy Dodson (Guidance); Andy Ferguson (Athletic Director); Dr. Ross Campbell (Head of School)
- Faculty: 70
- Grades: P3–12
- Enrollment: 640 (2023-2024)
- Student to teacher ratio: 18:1
- Campus size: 1A IHSAA
- Color
- Athletics conference: PAAC
- Team name: Patriots
- Affiliation: Christian
- Website: School website

Bethesda Christian School (BCS) is a private Christian school in Brownsburg, Indiana. Bethesda is accredited through the state of Indiana and the Association of Christian Schools International (ACSI) for grades K through 12. BCS also has an academic preschool program for ages 3 and 4. The school is affiliated with Parkside Bible Church, also located in Brownsburg.

== Elementary ==
Elementary includes grades Kindergarten through sixth grade. Preschool for ages three and four is also available. There are half day and full day options for both preschool and kindergarten.

== High school ==
High school has grades 7–12. The high school offers a Core 40 and Honors diploma. AP courses such as Biology, Calculus, English, European History, and Chemistry are offered. Seniors attend a leadership camp in August. On their senior trip, students have the opportunity to participate in mission work.

== Athletics ==
Bethesda Christian joined the Indiana High School Athletic Association (IHSAA) in 2002.

=== Bethesda sports ===
==== Boys sports ====
- Soccer
- Basketball
- Baseball
- Cross Country
- Golf

==== Girls sports ====
- Volleyball
- Basketball
- Cheerleading
- Softball
- Cross Country
- Soccer

== See also ==
- List of high schools in Indiana
