= Crawford County High School (Indiana) =

Location
- 1130 South State Road 66; Marengo, Indiana 47140; United States; 38°19′10″N 86°21′10″W

Information
- School type: Public
- Established: 1975–1976
- School district: Crawford County Community Schools
- Superintendent: Brandon Johnson
- CEEB code: 152190
- Principal: Brandy Stroud
- Teaching staff: 30.33 (FTE)
- Grades: 9–12
- Enrollment: 379 (2023–2024)
- Average class size: 15
- Student to teacher ratio: 12.50
- Campus type: Rural
- Color
- Slogan: Growing Toward Greatness
- Fight song: Keep Your Eye on Crawford High
- Athletics conference: Patoka Lake Athletic Conference
- Mascot: Wolfpack
- Nickname: Pack
- Team name: Wolfpack
- Website: www.cccs.k12.in.us/o/high-school.html

Crawford County High School is a small high school on the south side of Marengo and near Carefree, El Bethel, English, and Pilot Knob. It serves all of Crawford County, parts of Milltown in Harrison County, and parts of Orange County, Indiana, United States.

== History ==
Crawford County High opened in 1976 after the consolidation of the county's five former high schools: Milltown, Marengo, Patoka, Leavenworth, and English. The junior high was moved to the high school, and the former high schools were then turned into the five elementary schools. Later, the elementary schools in English and Marengo would fold, and the remaining three elementary schools would change their names to East Crawford, South Crawford, and West Crawford. In 2021, the high school was renovated to include the Crawford County Fieldhouse. 2026 marks the high school's 50th anniversary.

== Athletics ==
The Crawford County Wolfpack compete in the Patoka Lake Conference and the Indiana High School Athletic Association. Crawford County's boys sports include basketball, baseball, cross country, football, golf, tennis, track, and wrestling, while the girls sports are basketball, cross country, golf, softball, tennis, track, and volleyball. A cheer team, a dance squad, and a pep band perform at sporting events. The basketball and volleyball teams play at Ron Ferguson Gymnasium, named after the former athletic director. The football team competes on Breeden Field, which has a surrounding track and is used for track and football. The softball and baseball teams compete at fields near the school.

In 2017, the boys basketball team went to state and lost to Frankton, but three years later Crawford County shocked everyone by winning the sectional, which was the last game before the COVID-19 pandemic. In 2022, the school district announced the construction of a new gym, including three basketball courts, that would be finished in 2024.

== Campus ==
The campus is located outside of Marengo and includes many sports fields. 2021 renovations allowed the middle school to combine with the high school. Renovations included a new cafeteria, new rooms, and new hallways. The new Crawford County Fieldhouse offers more room for physical education and basketball on its three basketball courts.

== Notable faculty ==
- Dennie Oxley - Former member of the Indiana House of Representatives for District 73 (1998–2008)

== See also ==
- List of high schools in Indiana
