= Columbus Christian School =

Location
- 3170 Indiana Ave; Columbus, Indiana 47201; United States; 39°11′52″N 85°53′10″W

Information
- School type: Private
- Motto: Education with a higher purpose
- Religious affiliation: Christian
- Denomination: Nondenominational
- Established: 1976
- Status: Open
- Principal: Angie Donnell(elementary) & Tammy Williams(MS & HS)
- Administrator: Kendall Wildey
- Grades: PreK–12
- Gender: Co-Ed
- Enrollment: 423 (2023-2024)
- Colors: red, white, and blue
- Athletics conference: ICST
- Mascot: Crusader
- Nickname: CCS
- Team name: Crusaders
- Accreditation: ACSII
- Website: http://www.whycolumbuschristian.com

Columbus Christian School is a private, Christian school in Columbus, Indiana, United States. Established in 1976, Columbus Christian School is an inter-denominational private school offering Christian education to children from Preschool through the twelfth grade. It operates on three campuses in Columbus, North Vernon, and Brownstown.

== History ==
Columbus Christian School was started in 1976 because it wanted families to have a way from a faith based educational environment. The school has been supported by the East Columbus Christian Church. The first high school to graduate from CCS was the class of 2003.
