= Bourbon, Indiana =

- Town
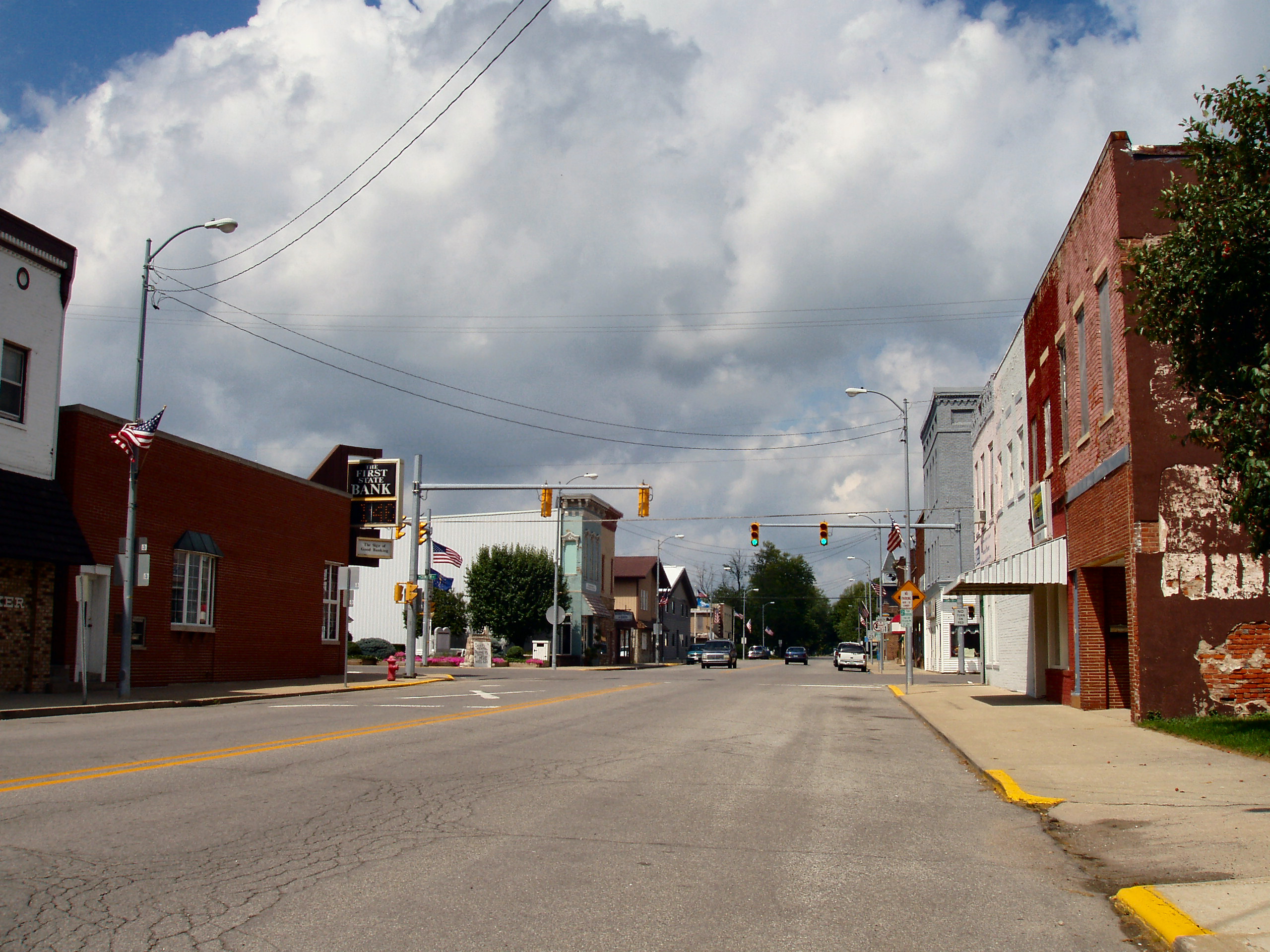
- Bourbon downtown

- Logo

- Location of Bourbon in Marshall County, Indiana.
- Coordinates: 41°17′52″N 86°7′1″W
- Country: United States
- State: Indiana
- County: Marshall
- Township: Bourbon

Area
  - Total: 1.15 sq mi (2.99 km^{2})
  - Land: 1.15 sq mi (2.98 km^{2})
  - Water: 0.0039 sq mi (0.01 km^{2})
- Elevation: 843 ft (257 m)

Population (2020)
  - Total: 1,698
  - Density: 1,475.0/sq mi (569.51/km^{2})
- Time zone: UTC-5 (EST)
  - Summer (DST): UTC-5 (EST)
- ZIP code: 46504
- Area code: 574
- FIPS code: 18-06760
- GNIS feature ID: 0431382
- Website: bourbon-in.gov

Bourbon is a town in Bourbon Township, Marshall County, Indiana, United States. The population was 1,698 at the 2020 census.

== History ==
The town of Bourbon was laid out in 1853 when it was certain the railroad would be extended to that point. It took its name from Bourbon Township, which was named after Bourbon County, Kentucky, the former home of many of the early settlers.

The Bourbon Community Building-Gymnasium was listed on the National Register of Historic Places in 2015.

== Geography ==
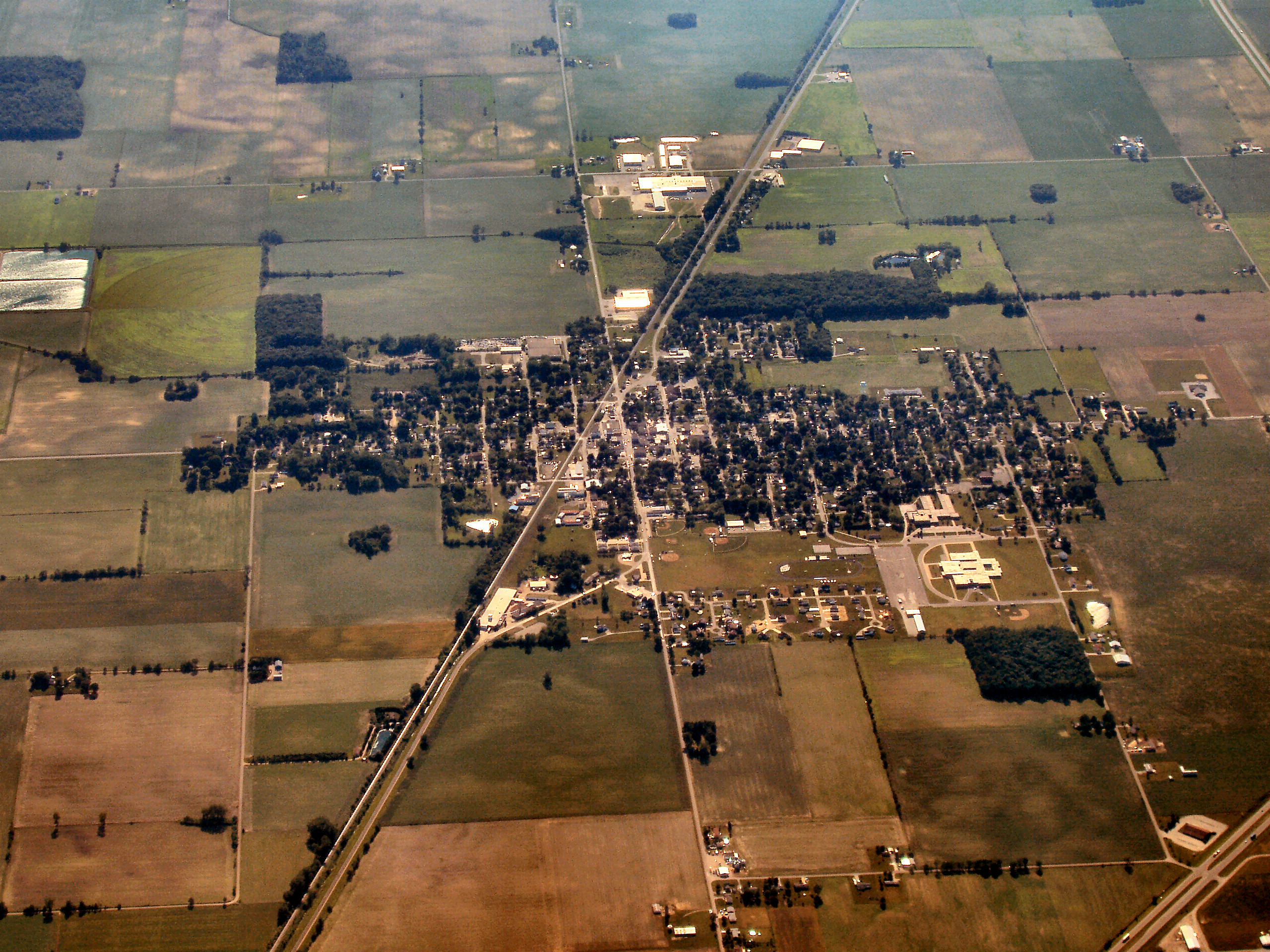
Bourbon from the east.

Bourbon is located at 41°17′52″N 86°7′1″W (41.297815, -86.116921).

According to the 2010 census, Bourbon has a total area of 0.99 square miles (2.56 km^{2}), all land.

== Demographics ==
Historical population
Census	Pop.	Note	%±
1870	874		—
1880	1,056		20.8%
1890	1,064		0.8%
1900	1,187		11.6%
1910	1,163		−2.0%
1920	1,259		8.3%
1930	1,193		−5.2%
1940	1,145		−4.0%
1950	1,404		22.6%
1960	1,522		8.4%
1970	1,606		5.5%
1980	1,522		−5.2%
1990	1,672		9.9%
2000	1,691		1.1%
2010	1,810		7.0%
2020	1,698		−6.2%
U.S. Decennial Census

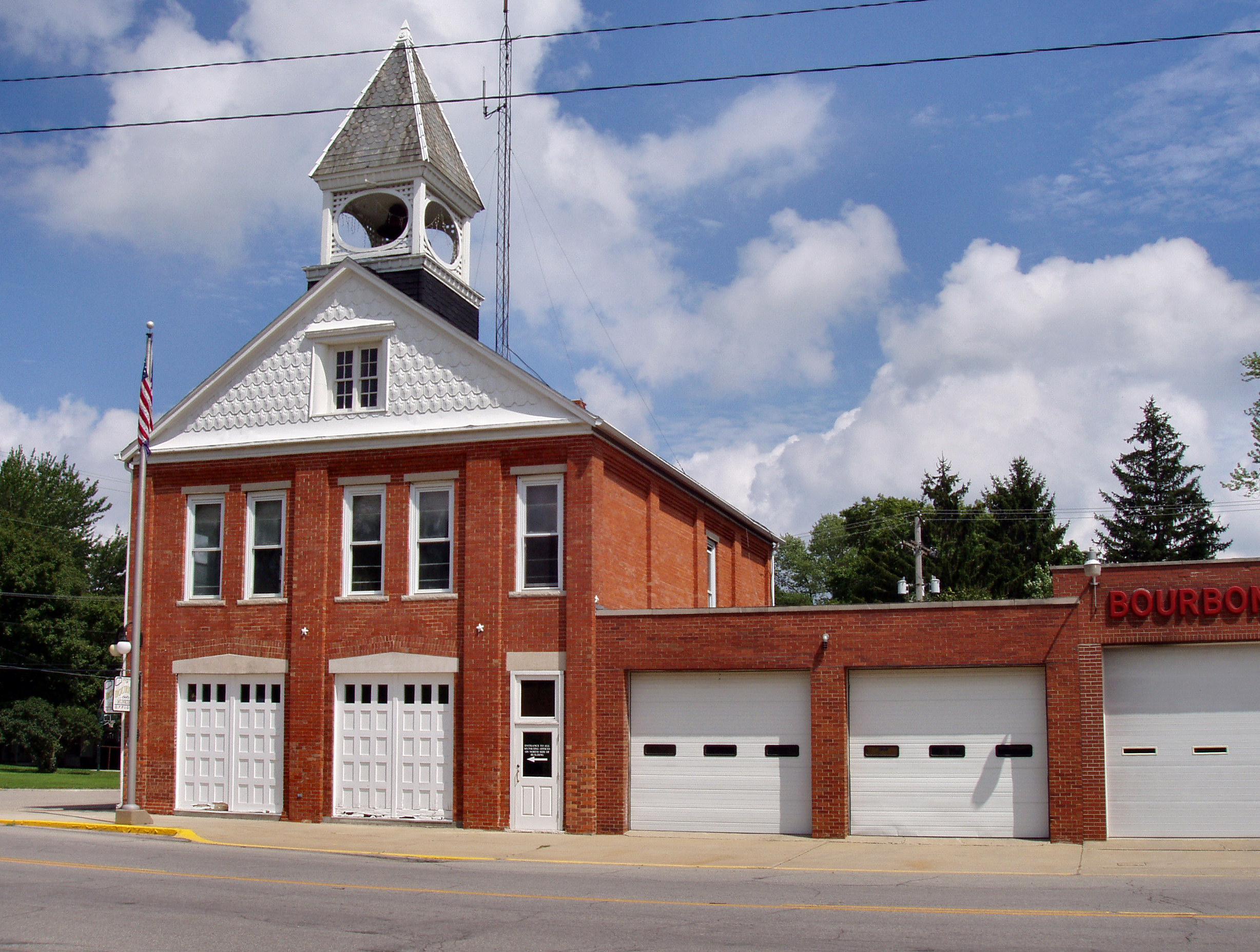
Bourbon municipal offices building.

=== 2020 census ===
As of the 2020 census, Bourbon had a population of 1,698. The median age was 36.3 years. 26.6% of residents were under the age of 18 and 12.6% of residents were 65 years of age or older. For every 100 females there were 93.0 males, and for every 100 females age 18 and over there were 86.2 males age 18 and over.

0.0% of residents lived in urban areas, while 100.0% lived in rural areas.

There were 692 households in Bourbon, of which 35.8% had children under the age of 18 living in them. Of all households, 43.6% were married-couple households, 17.1% were households with a male householder and no spouse or partner present, and 30.1% were households with a female householder and no spouse or partner present. About 30.5% of all households were made up of individuals and 13.1% had someone living alone who was 65 years of age or older.

There were 732 housing units, of which 5.5% were vacant. The homeowner vacancy rate was 1.7% and the rental vacancy rate was 4.9%.

Racial composition as of the 2020 census
Race	Number	Percent
White	1,560	91.9%
Black or African American	8	0.5%
American Indian and Alaska Native	0	0.0%
Asian	21	1.2%
Native Hawaiian and Other Pacific Islander	0	0.0%
Some other race	30	1.8%
Two or more races	79	4.7%
Hispanic or Latino (of any race)	89	5.2%

=== 2000 census ===
As of the census of 2000, there were 1,691 people, 646 households, and 443 families living in the town. The population density was 1,630.3 inhabitants per square mile (629.5/km^{2}). There were 702 housing units at an average density of 676.8 per square mile (261.3/km^{2}). The racial makeup of the town was 96.16% White, 0.06% African American, 0.24% Native American, 0.59% Asian, 0.18% Pacific Islander, 2.37% from other races, and 0.41% from two or more races. Hispanic or Latino of any race were 5.03% of the population.

There were 646 households, out of which 38.1% had children under the age of 18 living with them, 54.8% were married couples living together, 9.4% had a female householder with no husband present, and 31.4% were non-families. 28.6% of all households were made up of individuals, and 12.2% had someone living alone who was 65 years of age or older. The average household size was 2.62 and the average family size was 3.26.

In the town, the population was spread out, with 31.3% under the age of 18, 9.5% from 18 to 24, 31.3% from 25 to 44, 16.2% from 45 to 64, and 11.7% who were 65 years of age or older. The median age was 32 years. For every 100 females, there were 92.8 males. For every 100 females age 18 and over, there were 89.6 males.

The median income for a household in the town was $40,292, and the median income for a family was $50,000. Males had a median income of $32,679 versus $21,645 for females. The per capita income for the town was $17,054. About 4.1% of families and 5.9% of the population were below the poverty line, including 8.0% of those under age 18 and 8.4% of those age 65 or over.

== Education ==
The town has a lending library, the Bourbon Public Library.

Triton School Corporation is headquartered in Bourbon, along with Triton Elementary and Triton Junior–Senior High School, encompassing grades kindergarten through 12.

Bourbon Christian School is located on the north end of the town and encompasses grades 1 through 12.

== See also ==
- Isaac and Ruth Arnold House
- Bourbon Commercial Historic District
- Bourbon Community Building-Gymnasium
- Bourbon Residential Historic District
