= List of schools in Indianapolis =

Indianapolis is served by 11 public school districts, along with a number of public charter and private schools. Indianapolis also has eight local universities.

== Higher education ==
=== Institutions ===
Indianapolis is home to more than a dozen public and private colleges and universities. The "‡" symbol denotes university branches whose main campuses are located outside of the city.

- Ball State University Estopinal College of Architecture and Planning‡
- Butler University
  - Christian Theological Seminary
- Crossroads Bible College
- Indiana Bible College
- Indiana Tech‡
- Indiana University Indianapolis
  - Herron School of Art and Design
  - Kelley School of Business
  - Luddy School of Informatics, Computing, and Engineering
  - McKinney School of Law
  - O'Neill School of Public and Environmental Affairs
  - Indiana University School of Dentistry
  - Indiana University School of Education
  - Indiana University School of Liberal Arts
  - Indiana University School of Medicine
  - Indiana University School of Nursing
- Indiana Wesleyan University‡
- Ivy Tech Community College of Indiana
- Lincoln Tech‡
- Marian University
  - Bishop Simon Bruté College Seminary
  - Leighton School of Nursing
  - Wood College of Osteopathic Medicine
- Purdue University in Indianapolis‡
- University of Indianapolis
  - Annis School of Engineering
- Vincennes University‡
- WGU Indiana (online)

== Primary and secondary education ==
=== Public school districts ===
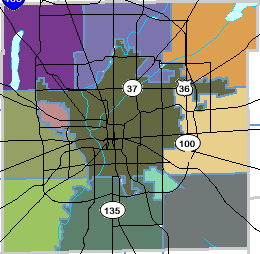
Indianapolis Public Schools
School Town of Speedway
Beech Grove City Schools
MSD Pike Township
MSD Washington Township
MSD Lawrence Township
MSD Warren Township
Franklin Township CSC
MSD Perry Township
MSD Decatur Township
MSD Wayne Township
Public school districts in Marion County

Name	Municipalities served	No. of schools	Enrollment
Beech Grove City Schools	Beech Grove	5	2,837
Franklin Township Community School Corporation	Indianapolis	11	11,139
Indianapolis Public Schools	Indianapolis	57	22,115
Metropolitan School District of Decatur Township	Indianapolis	9	6,681
Metropolitan School District of Lawrence Township	Indianapolis · Lawrence	17	16,247
Metropolitan School District of Pike Township	Indianapolis	13	10,901
Metropolitan School District of Warren Township	Indianapolis	16	11,801
Metropolitan School District of Washington Township	Indianapolis	14	10,901
Metropolitan School District of Wayne Township	Indianapolis	19	16,343
Perry Township Schools	Indianapolis · Southport	17	16,603
School Town of Speedway	Speedway	6	1,863
Source: National Center for Education Statistics

==== Indianapolis Public Schools ====
Indianapolis Public Schools, or IPS, is the largest school district in Marion County with nearly 37,000 students. Notable schools include:

- Arlington Middle School
- Arsenal Technical High School
- Crispus Attucks High School
- George Washington Community High School
- Northwest Middle School
- Shortridge High School
- Thomas Carr Howe Middle School

==== Beech Grove City Schools ====
Beech Grove City Schools is the public school district serving the city of Beech Grove, Indiana. The school district's current enrollment is 2,293 students.

- Beech Grove High School

==== Decatur Township ====
The Metropolitan School District of Decatur Township is a public school district located in Decatur Township, Indianapolis, Indiana. The school district's current enrollment is 6,131 students.

- Decatur Central High School

==== Franklin Township ====
Franklin Township Community School Corporation is a school district in Franklin Township, Indianapolis, Indiana, United States. The school district's current enrollment is 8,828 students.

- Franklin Central High School

==== Lawrence Township ====
The Metropolitan School District of Lawrence Township is a public school district located in Lawrence Township, Indianapolis, Indiana. It has an enrollment of 16,153.

- Lawrence Central High School
- Lawrence North High School

==== Perry Township Schools ====
Perry Township Schools is a public school district located in Perry Township, Indianapolis, Indiana. It has an enrollment of 14,272.

- Perry Meridian High School
- Southport High School

==== Pike Township ====
The Metropolitan School District of Pike Township is a public school district located in Pike Township, Indianapolis, Indiana. It has an enrollment of 10,620.

- Pike High School

==== School Town of Speedway ====
School Town of Speedway is the public school district serving the town of Speedway, Indiana. The school district's current enrollment is 1,653 students.

- Speedway Senior High School

==== Metropolitan School District of Warren Township ====
The Metropolitan School District of Warren Township is a public school district located in Warren Township, Indianapolis, Indiana. It has an enrollment of 12,503.

- Warren Central High School

==== Metropolitan School District of Washington Township ====
The Metropolitan School District of Washington Township is a public school district located in Washington Township, Indianapolis, Indiana. It has an enrollment of 10,421.

- North Central High School

==== Metropolitan School District of Wayne Township ====
The Metropolitan School District of Wayne Township is a public school district located in Wayne Township, Indianapolis, Indiana. It has an enrollment of 14,917.

- Ben Davis High School

=== State residential schools ===
- Indiana School for the Blind and Visually Impaired
- Indiana School for the Deaf

== Public charter schools ==
- BELIEVE Circle City High School
- Christel House Indianapolis
  - Christel House Watanabe High School
- Charles A. Tindley Accelerated School
- Circle City Prep
- Herron Classical Schools
  - Herron High School
- Hope Education Center
- Indianapolis Metropolitan High School
- Irvington Community Schools
- KIPP Indy Public Schools
- Purdue Polytechnic High Schools

== Private schools ==
- A Children's Habitat Montessori School
- Acton Academy Northwest Indianapolis
- Independence Academy of Indiana
- International School of Indiana
- The Orchard School
- Park Tudor School
- Sycamore School

== Parochial schools ==
- Indiana District of the Lutheran Church – Missouri Synod
  - Lutheran High School of Indianapolis
- Roman Catholic Archdiocese of Indianapolis
  - Bishop Chatard High School
  - Cardinal Ritter High School
  - Roncalli High School
  - Scecina Memorial High School
- Acts Christian Academy
- Brebeuf Jesuit Preparatory School
- Cathedral High School
- Covenant Christian High School
- Heritage Christian School
- Providence Cristo Rey High School
- St. Richard's Episcopal School
- Westside Christian School of the Nazarene

== Supplementary schools ==
- Indiana Japanese Language School

== Defunct schools ==
- The Chef's Academy
- Fall Creek Academy
- Fountain Square Academy
- Harrison College
- Indiana University–Purdue University Indianapolis
- Key Learning Community
- Latin School of Indianapolis
- Martin University
- New Beginnings High School
- Rabbi Naftali Riff Yeshiva
