= Indianapolis (balance) =

- Statistical entity
- Location within the state of Indiana
- Coordinates: 39°47′27″N 86°8′52″W
- Country: United States
- State: Indiana
- County: Marion

Area
  - Total: 368.1 sq mi (953.5 km^{2})
  - Land: 361.5 sq mi (936.2 km^{2})
  - Water: 6.7 sq mi (17.3 km^{2})

Population (2020)
  - Total: 887,642
  - Density: 2,456/sq mi (948.1/km^{2})
- Time zone: UTC-5 (Eastern (EST))
  - Summer (DST): UTC-4 (EDT)

Indianapolis (balance) is a statistical entity defined by the United States Census Bureau to represent the portion of the city of Indianapolis, Indiana, that is not within the "included towns". As of the 2020 census the balance had a total population of 887,642.

== Geography ==
According to the United States Census Bureau, the balance has a total area of 368.2 square miles (953.6 km^{2}). 361.5 square miles (936.3 km^{2}) of it is land and 6.7 square miles (17.4 km^{2}) of it is water. The total area is 1.81% water.

== Census areas ==
In addition to Indianapolis (balance), the consolidated Indianapolis-Marion County metropolitan government includes the following "included towns." These towns maintain their identity as separate towns under Indiana law, but are part of the consolidated government. They are Clermont, Crows Nest, Cumberland, Homecroft, Meridian Hills, North Crows Nest, Rocky Ripple, Spring Hill, Warren Park, Williams Creek, and Wynnedale. These "included towns" are distinct from what are termed the "excluded cities and towns" that are not part of the consolidated metropolitan government, namely, Beech Grove, Lawrence, Southport, and Speedway.

The demographic data in the Indianapolis article represents the entire consolidated governmental area. The data in this "balance" article represents the balance of the consolidated governmental area except the included towns listed above.

== Demographics ==
At the 2000 census there were 781,870 people, 320,107 households, and 192,704 families residing in the balance. The population density was 2,163.0/mi^{2} (835.1/km^{2}). There were 352,429 housing units at an average density of 376.4/km^{2} (975.0/mi^{2}). The racial makeup was 69.09% White, 25.50% Black or African American, 0.25% Native American, 1.43% Asian, 0.04% Pacific Islander, 2.04% from other races, and 1.64% from two or more races. Hispanic or Latino people of any race were 3.92%.

There were 320,107 households, 29.8% had children under the age of 18 living with them, 40.6% were married couples living together, 15.1% had a female householder with no husband present, and 39.8% were non-families. 32.0% of households were one person, and 8.5% were one person aged 65 or older. The average household size was 2.39 and the average family size was 3.04.

In the balance the population was spread out, with 25.7% under 18, 10.2% from 18 to 24, 32.9% from 25 to 44, 20.3% from 45 to 64, and 11.0% who were 65 or older. The median age was 34 years. For every 100 females, there were 93.7 males. For every 100 females age 18 and over, there were 90.2 males.

The median household income was $40,051 and the median family income was $48,755. Males had a median income of $36,302 versus $27,738 for females. The per capita income for "the balance" was $21,640. About 9.1% of families and 11.9% of the population were below the poverty line, including 16.2% of those under the age of 18 and 8.1% of those 65 and older.

== Education ==
Nine K–12 public school districts serve residents of the balance of Indianapolis as defined by the U.S. Census Bureau:

- Franklin Township Community School Corporation
- Indianapolis Public Schools
- Metropolitan School District of Decatur Township
- Metropolitan School District of Lawrence Township
- Metropolitan School District of Pike Township
- Metropolitan School District of Warren Township
- Metropolitan School District of Washington Township
- Metropolitan School District of Wayne Township
- Perry Township Schools

Beech Grove City Schools and Speedway School Town do not include any portions of the balance.

== See also ==
- History of Indianapolis
- Louisville/Jefferson County metro government (balance), Kentucky
- Nashville-Davidson (balance), Tennessee
