= Desegregation busing =

Attempt to racially diversify American public schools

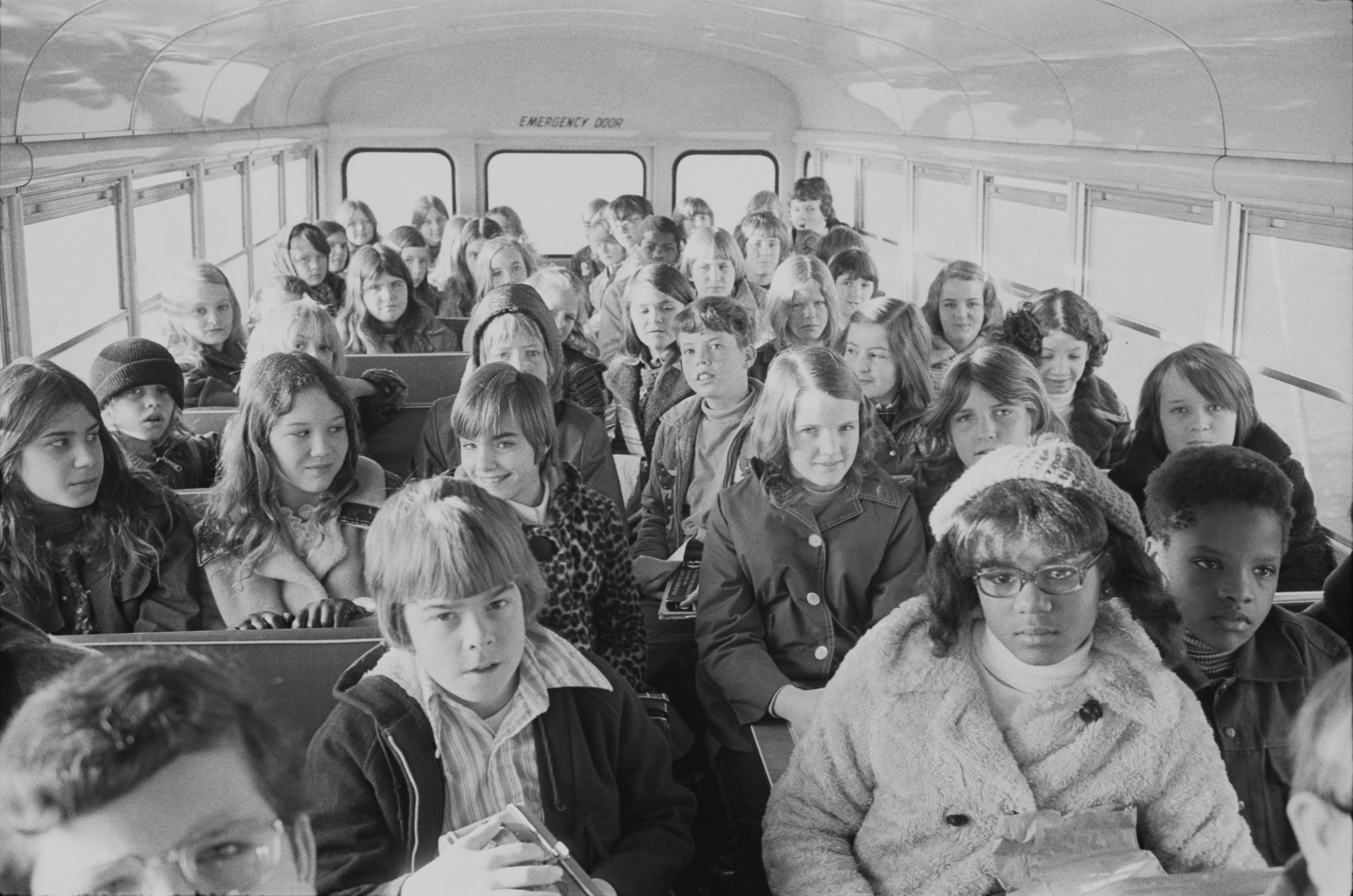
Integrated busing in Charlotte, North Carolina, February 1973

Desegregation busing (also known as integrated busing, forced busing, or simply busing) was a civil rights measure in the United States that came to national prominence in the 1970s. The goal of desegregation busing was to diversify the racial make-up of public schools by transporting students to more distant areas with less diverse student populations. Typically, this involved the busing of black students to schools out of district that were majority white. However, busing also occurred vice versa with the busing of white students to majority black schools.

While the 1954 U.S. Supreme Court landmark decision in Brown v. Board of Education declared racial segregation in public schools unconstitutional, many American schools continued to remain racially homogeneous. In an effort to address the ongoing de facto segregation in schools, the 1971 Supreme Court decision, Swann v. Charlotte-Mecklenburg Board of Education, ruled that the federal courts could use busing as a further integration tool to achieve racial balance.

Busing met considerable opposition from both white and black people. The policy may have contributed to the movement of large numbers of white families to suburbs of large cities, a phenomenon known as white flight, which further reduced the effectiveness of the policy. Many whites who stayed moved their children into private or parochial schools; these effects combined to make many urban school districts predominantly non-white, reducing any effectiveness mandatory busing may have had.

== History ==
=== Before World War II ===
Prior to World War II, most public schools in the country were de jure or de facto segregated. All Southern states had Jim Crow Laws mandating racial segregation of schools. Northern states and some border states were primarily white (in 1940, the populations of Detroit and Chicago were more than 90% white) and existing black populations were concentrated in urban ghettos partly as the result of restrictive covenants.

=== After World War II ===
The origins of desegregation busing can be traced back to two major developments that occurred in the United States during the 1940s and 1950s.

==== Black population shift ====
Starting in 1940, the Second Great Migration brought five million blacks from the agrarian South to the urban and manufacturing centers in Northern and Western cities to fill in the labor shortages during the industrial buildup of World War II and for better opportunities during the post-war economic boom. Shelley v. Kraemer (1948) allowed them to settle in formerly white neighborhoods, contributing to racial tension. Meanwhile, the post-war housing boom and the rise of suburbia allowed whites to migrate into the suburbs. By 1960, all major Northern and Western cities had sizable black populations (e.g., 23% in Chicago, 29% in Detroit, and 32% in Los Angeles). Blacks tended to be concentrated in inner cities, whereas newer suburbs of most cities were almost exclusively white.

==== Legal rulings ====
At the same time, the U.S. Supreme Court ruling in Brown v. Board of Education (1954) overturned racial segregation laws for public schools that had been in place in a number of states, since the late 19th century, and ruled that separate but equal schools were "inherently unequal". Although the Brown decision affirmed principles of equality and justice, it did not specify how its ruling would promote equality in education. Thurgood Marshall and the NAACP wanted a speedy process for desegregating the school districts, but the Court waited until the following year to make its recommendations. Reasons for delaying had to do with the changes in the Court and with Chief Justice Earl Warren steering a careful course given the expected opposition from Southern states. In May 1955, the Court ruled in Brown II that the school districts desegregate "with all deliberate speed". Public school administrators had to begin the process of desegregating the schools through the development of policies that would promote racial mixing. A backlash of resistance and violence ensued. Even members of Congress refused to abide by the decision. In 1956 over a hundred congressmen signed the Southern Manifesto, promising to use all legal means to undermine and reverse the Court's ruling.

The momentum continued with two additional Supreme Court decisions aimed at implementation. In 1968, the Warren Court in Green v. County School Board of New Kent County, rejected a freedom of choice plan. The Court ordered the county to desegregate immediately and eliminate racial discrimination "root and branch". Then in 1971, the Burger Court in Swann v. Charlotte-Mecklenburg Board of Education ruled that the school district must achieve racial balance even if it meant redrawing school boundaries and the use of busing as a legal tool. The impact of Green and Swann served to end all remnants of de jure segregation in the South. However, the consequence of the Swann decision ushered in new forms of resistance in subsequent decades. The decision failed to address de facto segregation.

Consequently, despite being found "inherently unequal" in Brown v. Board of Education, by the late 1960s public schools remained de facto segregated in many cities because of demographic patterns, school district lines being intentionally drawn to segregate the schools racially, and, in some cases, due to conscious efforts to send black children to inferior schools. Thus, for example, by 1969, more than nine of every ten black students in Nashville still attended all-black schools. Evidence of such de facto segregation motivated early proponents of plans to engage in conscious "integration" of public schools, by busing schoolchildren to schools other than their neighborhood schools, with an objective to equalize racial imbalances. Proponents of such plans argued that with the schools integrated, minority students would have equal access to equipment, facilities, and resources that the cities' white students had, thus giving all students in the city equal educational opportunities.

A federal court found that in Boston, schools were constructed and school district lines drawn intentionally to segregate the schools racially. In the early 1970s, a series of court decisions found that the racially imbalanced schools trampled the rights of minority students. As a remedy, courts ordered the racial integration of school districts within individual cities, sometimes requiring the racial composition of each individual school in the district to reflect the composition of the district as a whole. This was generally achieved by transporting children by school bus to a school in a different area of the district.

The judge who instituted the Detroit busing plan said that busing "is a considerably safer, more reliable, healthful and efficient means of getting children to school than either carpools or walking, and this is especially true for younger children". He, therefore, included kindergarten children in the busing scheme: "Transportation of kindergarten children for upwards of forty-five minutes, one-way, does not appear unreasonable, harmful, or unsafe in any way." (Some research has shown however the deleterious effects of long bus rides on student health and academic achievement). The resultant Supreme Court case, Milliken v. Bradley (1974), imposed limits on busing. The key issue was whether a district court could order a metropolitan-wide desegregation plan between urban Detroit and suburban school districts. Busing would play a key role in the implementation phase. The Court essentially declared that federal courts did not have the authority to order inter-district desegregation unless it could be proven that suburban school districts intentionally mandated segregation policies. The implication of the decision was that suburban school districts were not affected by the principles established by Brown. De facto segregation was allowed to persist. The courts could order desegregation where segregation patterns existed, but only within municipalities, not suburban areas. The lasting consequence of the Milliken decision is that it opened the door for whites to flee to the suburbs and not be concerned about compliance with mandatory integration policies.

With waning public support, the courts began relaxing judicial supervision of school districts during the 1990s and 2000s, calling for voluntary efforts to achieve racial balance.

In the early 1990s, the Rehnquist Court ruled in three cases coming from Oklahoma City (in 1991), DeKalb County in Georgia (in 1992), and Kansas City (in 1995) that federal judges could ease their supervision of school districts "once legally enforced segregation had been eliminated to the extent practicable". With these decisions, the Rehnquist Court opened the door for school districts throughout the country to get away from judicial supervision once they had achieved unitary status. Unitary Status meant that a school district had successfully eliminated segregation in dual school systems and thus was no longer bound to court-ordered desegregation policies.

Then in 2002, the Supreme Court declined to review a lower court decision in Belk v. Charlotte-Mecklenburg Board of Education which declared that the school system had achieved desegregation status and that the method to achieve integration, like busing, was unnecessary. The refusal of the Court to hear the challenges to the lower court decision effectively overturned the earlier 1971 Swann ruling.

Finally, in 2007, the Roberts Court produced a contentious 5–4 ruling in Parents Involved in Community Schools v. Seattle School District No. 1 (PICS). The decision prohibited the use of racial classifications in student assignment plans to maintain racial balance. Whereas the Brown case ruled that racial segregation violated the Constitution, now the use of racial classifications violated the equal protection clause of the 14th Amendment. Writing for the minority, Justice Breyer said the "ruling contradicted previous decisions upholding race-conscious pupil assignments and would hamper local school boards' efforts to prevent 'resegregation' in individual schools".

=== Civil rights movement ===
The struggle to desegregate the schools received impetus from the Civil Rights Movement, whose goal was to end legal segregation in all public places. The movement's efforts culminated in Congress passing the Civil Rights Act of 1964, the Voting Rights Act of 1965, and the Civil Rights Act of 1968. Signed by President Lyndon Johnson, the three laws were intended to end discriminatory voting practices and segregation of public accommodations and housing. The importance of these three laws was the injection of both the legislative and executive branches joining the judiciary to promote racial integration. In addition, the Civil Rights Act of 1964 authorized the federal government to cut off funding if Southern school districts did not comply and also to bring lawsuits against school officials who resisted.

One argument against the Civil Rights Act of 1964 that opponents of the proposed legislation found particularly compelling was that the bill would require forced busing to achieve certain racial quotas in schools. Proponents of the bill, such as Emanuel Celler and Jacob Javits, said that the bill would not authorize such measures. Leading sponsor Sen. Hubert Humphrey wrote two amendments specifically designed to outlaw busing. Humphrey said "if the bill were to compel it, it would be a violation [of the Constitution], because it would be handling the matter on the basis of race and we would be transporting children because of race". While Javits said any government official who sought to use the bill for busing purposes "would be making a fool of himself", two years later the Department of Health, Education and Welfare said that Southern school districts would be required to meet mathematical ratios of students by busing.

=== Sociological study ===
Another catalyst for the development of busing was an sociological report on educational equality commissioned by the U.S. government in the 1960s. It was one of the largest studies in history, with more than 150,000 students in the sample. The result was a massive report of over 700 pages. That 1966 report—titled "Equality of Educational Opportunity" (or often simply called the "Coleman Report" after its author James Coleman)—contained many controversial findings. One conclusion from the study was that, while black schools in the South were not significantly underfunded as compared to white schools, and while per-pupil funding did not contribute significantly to differences in educational outcomes, socially disadvantaged black children still benefited significantly from learning in mixed-race classrooms. Thus, it was argued that busing (as opposed to simply increasing funding to segregated schools) was necessary for achieving racial equality.

=== Reaction ===
==== Before 2007 ====
The impact of the Brown v. Board of Education ruling was limited because whites and blacks tended to live in all-white or all-black communities. Initial integration in the South tended to be symbolic: for example, the integration of Clinton High School, the first public school in Tennessee to be integrated, amounted to the admission of twelve black students to a formerly all-white school.

"Forced busing" was a term used by many to describe the mandates that generally came from the courts. Court-ordered busing to achieve school desegregation was used mainly in large, ethnically segregated school systems, including Boston, Massachusetts; Cleveland and Columbus, Ohio; Kansas City, Missouri; Pasadena and San Francisco, California; Richmond, Virginia; Detroit, Michigan; and Wilmington, Delaware. From 1972 to 1980, despite busing, the percentage of blacks attending mostly-minority schools barely changed, moving from 63.6 percent to 63.3 percent. Forced busing was implemented starting in the 1971 school year, and from 1970 to 1980 the percentage of blacks attending mostly-minority schools decreased from 66.9 percent to 62.9 percent. The South saw the largest percentage change from 1968 to 1980 with a 23.8 percent decrease in blacks attending mostly-minority schools and a 54.8 percent decrease in blacks attending 90%–100% minority schools.

In some southern states in the 1960s and 1970s, parents opposed to busing created new private schools. The schools, called segregation academies, were sometimes organized with the support of the local White Citizen's Council.

For the 1975–76 school year, the Louisville, Kentucky school district, which was not integrated due to whites largely moving to the suburbs, was forced to start a busing program. The first day, 1,000 protestors rallied against the busing, and a few days into the process, 8,000 to 10,000 whites from Jefferson County, Kentucky, many teenagers, rallied at the district's high schools and fought with police trying to break up the crowds. Police cars were vandalized, 200 were arrested, and people were hurt in the melee, but despite further rallies being banned the next day by Louisville's mayor, demonstrators showed up to the schools the following day. Kentucky Governor Julian Carroll sent 1,800 members of the Kentucky National Guard and stationed them on every bus. On September 26, 1975, 400 protestors held a rally at Southern High School, which was broken up by police tear gas, followed by a rally of 8,000 the next day, who marched led by a woman in a wheelchair to prevent police reprisals while cameras were running. Despite the protests, Louisville's busing program continued.

Congressional opposition to busing continued. Delaware senator (and future 46th US President) Joe Biden said "I don't feel responsible for the sins of my father and grandfather," and that busing was "a liberal train wreck." In 1977, senators William Roth and Biden proposed the "Biden-Roth" amendment. This amendment "prevented judges from ordering wider busing to achieve actually-integrated districts." Despite Biden's lobbying of other senators and getting the support of Judiciary Committee chairman James Eastland, "Biden-Roth" narrowly lost.

==== After 2007 ====
Civil rights advocates see the 2007 joint ruling on Parents Involved in Community Schools v. Seattle School Dist. No. 1 and Meredith v. Jefferson County Board of Education of the Roberts court as the inevitable consequence of gradual court decisions dating back to the early 1970s to ease judicial supervision and limit important tools to achieve integrated schools. Even those school districts that voluntarily created race-conscious programs are under pressure to abandon these efforts as the white parents are refusing to participate in any pupil assignment programs. In some cases, white parents filed reverse discrimination lawsuits in court. Wherever the courts have backed away from mandating school districts to implement desegregation plans, resegregation of Blacks and Latinos has increased dramatically. In 1988, 44 percent of southern black students were attending majority-white schools. In 2005, 27 percent of black students were attending majority white schools. By restricting the tools by which schools can address school segregation, many fear that the PICS decision will continue to accelerate this trend. The ruling reflects the culmination of the conservatives' central message on education, as alleged by the liberal Civil Rights Project, that "race should be ignored, inequalities should be blamed on individuals and schools, and existing civil rights remedies should be dismantled". In 2001 Congress passed the No Child Left Behind Act (NCLB) which was promptly signed by President George W. Bush. The law put a premium on student testing, not integration, to measure academic progress. Financial penalties were incurred on schools if students did not demonstrate adequate academic performance. While initially supported by Democrats, critics say the law has failed to adequately address the achievement gap between whites and minorities and that there are problems with implementation and inflexible provisions.

== Criticism ==
=== Popular opinion ===
Support for the practice is influenced by the methodology of the study conducted. In a Gallup poll taken in 1973, very low percentages of whites (4 percent) and blacks (9 percent) supported busing outside of local neighborhoods, even though majorities were in favour of other desegregation methods such as redrawing school district boundaries and building low-income housing in middle-income areas. However, a longitudinal study has shown that support for desegregation busing among black respondents has only dropped below 50% once from 1972 to 1976 while support among white respondents has steadily increased. This increased support may be due to the diminished impact of desegregation policies over time. A 1978 study by the RAND Corporation set out to find why whites were opposed to busing and concluded that it was because they believed it destroyed neighborhood schools and camaraderie and increased discipline problems. It is said that busing eroded the community pride and support that neighborhoods had for their local schools. After busing, 60 percent of Boston parents, both black and white, reported more discipline problems in schools. Black children were more likely to be bused than whites, and some black parents saw it as discrimination that uprooted their children from their communities. Politicians and judges who supported busing were seen as hypocrites, as many sent their own children to private school. In the 1968, 1972, and 1976 presidential elections, candidates opposed to busing were elected each time, and Congress voted repeatedly to end court-mandated busing.

Ultimately, many black leaders, from Wisconsin State Rep. Annette Polly Williams, a Milwaukee Democrat, to Cleveland Mayor Michael R. White led efforts to end busing.

=== White flight and private schools ===
Busing is claimed to have accelerated a trend of middle-class relocation to the suburbs of metropolitan areas. Many opponents of busing claimed the existence of "white flight" based on the court decisions to integrate schools. Such stresses led some white middle-class families in many communities to desert the public schools and create a network of private schools.

During the 1970s, 60 Minutes reported that some members of Congress, government, and the press who supported busing most vociferously sent their own children to private schools, including Senator Ted Kennedy, George McGovern, Thurgood Marshall, Phil Hart, Ben Bradlee, Senator Birch Bayh, Tom Wicker, Philip Geyelin, and Donald Fraser. Many of the judges who ordered busing also sent their children to private schools.

=== Distance ===
Some critics of busing cited increases in distance to schools. However, segregation of schools often entailed far more distant busing. For example, in Tampa, Florida, the longest bus ride was 9 miles (14 km) under desegregation whereas it was 25 miles (40 km) during segregation.

=== Effect on already-integrated schools ===
Critics point out that children in the Northeast were often bused from integrated schools to less integrated schools. The percentage of Northeastern black children who attended a predominantly black school increased from 67 percent in 1968 to 80 percent in 1980 (a higher percentage than in 1954).

=== Effect on academic performance ===
In 1978, a proponent of busing, Nancy St. John, studied 100 cases of urban busing from the North and did not find what she had been looking for; she found no cases in which significant black academic improvement occurred, but many cases where race relations suffered due to busing, as those in forced-integrated schools had worse relations with those of the opposite race than those in non-integrated schools. Researcher David Armour, also looking for hopeful signs, found that busing "heightens racial identity" and "reduces opportunities for actual contact between the races". A 1992 study led by Harvard University Professor Gary Orfield, who supports busing, found black and Hispanic students lacked "even modest overall improvement" as a result of court-ordered busing.

Economist Thomas Sowell wrote that the stated premise for school busing was flawed, as de facto racial segregation in schools did not necessarily lead to poor education for black students.

== Effects ==
Busing integrated school age ethnic minorities with the larger community. The Milliken v. Bradley Supreme Court decision that busing children across districts is unconstitutional limited the extent of busing to within metropolitan areas. This decision made suburbs attractive to those who wished to evade busing.

Some metropolitan areas in which land values and property-tax structures were less favorable to relocation saw significant declines in enrollment of whites in public schools as white parents chose to enroll their children in private schools. Currently, most segregation occurs across school districts as large cities have moved significantly toward racial balance among their schools.

Recent research by Eric Hanushek, John Kain, and Steven Rivkin has shown that the level of achievement by black students is adversely affected by higher concentrations of black students in their schools. Additionally, the impact of racial concentration appears to be greatest for high-achieving black students.

== Historical examples ==
=== Boston, Massachusetts ===
In 1965 Massachusetts passed into law the Racial Imbalance Act, which ordered school districts to desegregate or risk losing state educational funding. The first law of its kind in the nation, it was opposed by many in Boston, especially less-well-off white ethnic areas, such as the Irish-American neighborhoods of South Boston and Charlestown.

=== Springfield, Massachusetts ===
Unlike Boston, which experienced a large degree of racial violence following Judge Arthur Garrity's decision to desegregate the city's public schools in 1974, Springfield quietly enacted its own desegregation busing plans. Although not as well-documented as Boston's crisis, Springfield's situation centered on the city's elementary schools. Much of the primary evidence for Springfield's busing plans stemmed from a March 1976 report by a committee for the Massachusetts Commission on Civil Rights (MCCR). According to the report, 30 of the city's 36 elementary schools were grouped into six separate districts during the 1974–75 school year, and each district contained at least one racially imbalanced school. The basic idea behind the "six-district" plan was to preserve a neighborhood feeling for school children while busing them locally to improve not only racial imbalances, but also educational opportunities in the school system.

=== Charlotte, North Carolina ===
Charlotte operated under "freedom of choice" plans until the Supreme Court upheld Judge McMillan's decision in Swann v. Mecklenburg in 1971. The NAACP won the Swann case by producing evidence that Charlotte schools placed over 10,000 white and black students in schools that were not the closest to their homes. Importantly, the Swann v. Mecklenburg case illustrated that segregation was the product of local policies and legislation rather than a natural outcome. In response, an anti-busing organization titled Concerned Parents Association (CPA) was formed in Charlotte. Ultimately, the CPA failed to prevent busing. In 1974, West Charlotte High school even hosted students from Boston to demonstrate the benefits of peaceful integration. Since Capacchione v. Charlotte-Mecklenburg Schools in 1999, however, Charlotte has once again become segregated. A report in 2019 shows that Charlotte-Mecklenburg schools are as segregated as they were before the Brown v. Board of Education decision in 1954.

=== Kansas City, Missouri ===
In 1985, a federal court took partial control of the Kansas City, Missouri School District (KCMSD). Since the district and the state had been found severally liable for the lack of integration, the state was responsible for making sure that money was available for the program. It was one of the most expensive desegregation efforts attempted and included busing, a magnet school program, and an extensive plan to improve the quality of inner city schools. The entire program was built on the premise that extremely good schools in the inner-city area combined with paid busing would be enough to achieve integration.

=== Las Vegas, Nevada ===
In May 1968, the Southern Nevada chapter of the National Association for the Advancement of Colored People (NAACP) filed a lawsuit against the Clark County School District (CCSD). The NAACP wanted the CCSD to acknowledge publicly, and likewise, act against the de facto segregation that existed in six elementary schools located on the city's Westside. This area of Las Vegas had traditionally been a black neighborhood. Therefore, the CCSD did not see the need to desegregate the schools, as the cause of segregation appeared to result from factors outside of its immediate control.

The case initially entered the Eighth Judicial District Court of Nevada, but quickly found its way to the Nevada Supreme Court. According to Brown II, all school desegregation cases had to be heard at the federal level if they reached a state's highest court. As a result, the Las Vegas case, which became known as Kelly v. Clark County School District, was eventually heard by the U.S. Ninth Circuit Court of Appeals. On May 10, 1972, the Ninth Circuit handed down its decision in favor of the NAACP, which therefore required the CCSD to implement a plan for integration. The CCSD then instituted its Sixth Grade Center Plan, which converted the Westside's six elementary schools into sixth-grade classrooms where nearly all of the school district's sixth graders (black and white alike) would be bused for the 1972–73 school year.

=== Los Angeles, California ===
In 1963, a lawsuit, Crawford v. Board of Education of the City of Los Angeles, was filed to end segregation in the Los Angeles Unified School District. The California Supreme Court required the district to come up with a plan in 1977. The board returned to court with what the court of appeal years later would describe as "one of if not the most drastic plan of mandatory student reassignment in the nation". A desegregation busing plan was developed, to be implemented in the 1978 school year. Two suits to stop the enforced busing plan, both titled Bustop, Inc. v. Los Angeles Board of Education, were filed by the group Bustop Inc., and were petitioned to the United States Supreme Court. The petitions to stop the busing plan were subsequently denied by Justice Rehnquist and Justice Powell. California Constitutional Proposition 1, which mandated that busing follow the Equal Protection Clause of the U.S. Constitution, passed in 1979 with 70 percent of the vote. The Crawford v. Board of Education of the City of Los Angeles lawsuit was heard in the Supreme Court in 1982. The Supreme Court upheld the decision that Proposition 1 was constitutional, and that, therefore, mandatory busing was not permissible.

=== Nashville, Tennessee ===
In comparison with many other cities in the nation, Nashville was not a hotbed of racial violence or massive protest during the civil rights era. In fact, the city was a leader of school desegregation in the South, even housing a few small schools that were minimally integrated before the Brown v. Board of Education decision in 1954. Despite this initial breakthrough, however, full desegregation of the schools was a far cry from reality in Nashville in the mid-1950s, and thus 22 plaintiffs, including black student Robert Kelley, filed suit against the Nashville Board of Education in 1955.

The result of that lawsuit was what came to be known as the "Nashville Plan," an attempt to integrate the public schools of Nashville (and later all of Davidson County when the district was consolidated in 1963). The plan, beginning in 1957, involved the gradual integration of schools by working up through the grades each year starting in the fall of 1957 with first graders. Very few black children who had been zoned for white schools showed up at their assigned campus on the first day of school, and those who did met with angry mobs outside several city elementary schools. No white children assigned to black schools showed up to their assigned campuses.

After a decade of this gradual integration strategy, it became evident that the schools still lacked full integration. Many argued that Housing Segregation was the true culprit in the matter. In 1970 the Kelley case was reintroduced to the courts. Ruling on the case was Judge Leland Clure Morton, who, after seeking advice from consultants from the United States Department of Health, Education, and Welfare, decided the following year that to correct the problem, forced busing of the children was to be mandated, among the many parts to a new plan that was finally decided on. This was a similar plan to that enacted in Charlotte-Mecklenburg Schools in Charlotte, North Carolina, the same year.

What followed were mixed emotions from both the black and white communities. Many whites did not want their children to share schools with black children, arguing that it would decrease the quality of their education. While a triumph for some, many blacks believed that the new plan would enforce the closure of neighborhood schools such as Pearl High School, which brought the community together. Parents from both sides did not like the plan because they had no control over where their children were going to be sent to school, a problem that many other cities had during the 1970s when busing was mandated across the country. Despite the judge's decision and the subsequent implementation of the new busing plan, the city stood divided.

As in many other cities across the country at this time, many white citizens took action against the desegregation laws. Organized protests against the busing plan began before the order was even official, led by future mayoral candidate Casey Jenkins. While some protested, many other white parents began pulling their children out of the public schools and enrolling them in the numerous private schools that began to spring up almost overnight in Nashville in the 1960s and 1970s. Many of these schools continued to be segregated through the 1970s. Other white parents moved outside of the city limits and eventually outside the Davidson County line so as not to be part of the Metropolitan District and thus not part of the busing plan.

In 1979 and 1980, the Kelley case was again brought back to the courts because of the busing plan's failure to fully integrate the Metropolitan Nashville Public Schools (MNPS). The plan was reexamined and reconfigured to include some concessions made by the school board and the Kelley plaintiffs and in 1983 the new plan, which still included busing, was introduced. However, problems with "white flight" and private schools continued to segregate MNPS to a certain degree, a problem that has never fully been solved.

=== Pasadena, California ===
In 1970 a federal court ordered the desegregation of the public schools in Pasadena, California. At that time, the proportion of white students in those schools reflected the proportion of whites in the community, 54 percent and 53 percent, respectively. After the desegregation process began, large numbers of whites in the upper and middle classes who could afford it pulled their children from the integrated public school system and placed them into private schools instead. As a result, by 2004 Pasadena became home to 63 private schools, which educated one-third of all school-aged children in the city, and the proportion of white students in the public schools had fallen to 16 percent. In the meantime, the proportion of whites in the community has declined somewhat as well, to 37 percent in 2006. The superintendent of Pasadena's public schools characterized them as being to whites "like the bogey-man", and mounted policy changes, including a curtailment of busing, and a publicity drive to induce affluent whites to put their children back into public schools.

=== Prince George's County, Maryland ===
In 1974, Prince George's County, Maryland, became the largest school district in the United States forced to adopt a busing plan. The county, a large suburban school district east of Washington, D.C., was over 80 percent white in population and in the public schools. In some county communities close to Washington, there was a higher concentration of black residents than in more outlying areas. Through a series of desegregation orders after the Brown decision, the county had a neighborhood-based system of school boundaries. However, the NAACP argued that housing patterns in the county still reflected the vestiges of segregation. Against the will of the Board of Education of Prince George's County, the federal court ordered that a school busing plan be set in place. A 1974 Gallup poll showed that 75 percent of county residents were against forced busing and that only 32 percent of blacks supported it.

The transition was very traumatic as the court ordered that the plan be administered with "all due haste". This happened during the middle of the school term, and students, except those in their senior year in high school, were transferred to different schools to achieve racial balance. Many high school sports teams' seasons and other typical school activities were disrupted. Life in general for families in the county was disrupted by things such as the changes in daily times to get children ready and receive them after school, transportation logistics for extracurricular activities, and parental participation activities such as volunteer work in the schools and PTA meetings.

The federal case and the school busing order was officially ended in 2001, as the "remaining vestiges of segregation" had been erased to the court's satisfaction. Unfortunately, the ultimate result has been resegregation through changes to county demographics, as the percentage of white county residents dropped from over 80% in 1974 to 27% in 2010. Neighborhood-based school boundaries were restored. The Prince George's County Public Schools was ordered to pay the NAACP more than $2 million in closing attorney fees and is estimated to have paid the NAACP over $20 million over the course of the case.

=== Richmond, Virginia ===
In April 1971, in the case Bradley v. Richmond School Board, Federal District Judge Robert R. Merhige, Jr., ordered an extensive citywide busing program in Richmond, Virginia. When the massive busing program began in the fall of 1971, parents of all races complained about the long rides, hardships with transportation for extracurricular activities, and the separation of siblings when elementary schools at opposite sides of the city were "paired", (i.e., splitting lower and upper elementary grades into separate schools). The result was further white flight to private schools and to suburbs in the neighboring counties of Henrico and Chesterfield that were predominantly white. In January 1972, Merhige ruled that students in Henrico and Chesterfield counties would have to be bused into the City of Richmond to decrease the high percentage of black students in Richmond's schools. This order was overturned by the Fourth Circuit Court of Appeals on June 6, 1972, barring forced busing schemes that made students cross county/city boundaries. (Note: Since 1871, Virginia has had independent cities which are not politically located within counties, although some are completely surrounded geographically by a single county. This distinctive and unusual arrangement was pivotal in the Court of Appeals decision overturning Merhige's ruling). The percentage of white students in Richmond city schools declined from 45 to 21 percent between 1960 and 1975 and continued to decline over the next several decades. By 2010 white students accounted for less than 9 percent of student enrollment in Richmond. This so-called "white flight" prevented Richmond schools from ever becoming truly integrated. A number of assignment plans were tried to address the non-racial concerns, and eventually, most elementary schools were "unpaired".

=== Wilmington, Delaware ===
In Wilmington, Delaware, located in New Castle County, segregated schools were required by law until 1954, when, due to Belton v. Gebhart (which was later rolled into Brown v. Board of Education on appeal), the school system was forced to desegregate. As a result, the school districts in the Wilmington metropolitan area were split into eleven districts covering the metropolitan area (Alfred I. duPont, Alexis I. duPont, Claymont, Conrad, De La Warr, Marshallton-McKean, Mount Pleasant, New Castle-Gunning Bedford, Newark, Stanton, and Wilmington school districts). However, this reorganization did little to address the issue of segregation, since the Wilmington schools (Wilmington and De La Warr districts) remained predominantly black, while the suburban schools in the county outside the city limits remained predominantly white.

In 1976, the U.S. District Court, in Evans v. Buchanan, ordered that the school districts of New Castle County all be combined into a single district governed by the New Castle County Board of Education. The District Court ordered the Board to implement a desegregation plan in which the students from the predominantly black Wilmington and De La Warr districts were required to attend school in the predominantly white suburb districts, while students from the predominantly white districts were required to attend school in Wilmington or De La Warr districts for three years (usually 4th through 6th grade). In many cases, this required students to be bused a considerable distance (12–18 miles in the Christina School District) because of the distance between Wilmington and some of the major communities of the suburban area (such as Newark).

However, the process of handling an entire metropolitan area as a single school district resulted in a revision to the plan in 1981, in which the New Castle County schools were again divided into four separate districts (Brandywine, Christina, Colonial, and Red Clay). However, unlike the 1954 districts, each of these districts was racially balanced and encompassed inner city and suburban areas. Each of the districts continued a desegregation plan based upon busing.

The requirements for maintaining racial balance in the schools of each of the districts was ended by the District Court in 1994, but the process of busing students to and from the suburbs for schooling continued largely unchanged until 2001, when the Delaware state government passed House Bill 300, mandating that the districts convert to sending students to the schools closest to them, a process that continues as of 2007. In the 1990s, Delaware schools would use the Choice program, which would allow children to apply to schools in other school districts based on space.

Wilmington High, which, many felt, was a victim of the busing order, closed in 1998 due to dropping enrollment. The campus would become home to Cab Calloway School of the Arts, a magnet school focused on the arts that was established in 1992. It would also house Charter School of Wilmington, which focuses on math and science, and opened up in 1996.

Delaware currently has some of the highest rates in the nation of children who attend private schools, magnet schools, and charter schools, due to the perceived weaknesses of the public school system.

=== Indianapolis, Indiana ===
Institutional racial segregation was coming to light in Indianapolis in the late 1960s as a result of Civil Rights reformation. U.S. District Judge S. Hugh Dillin issued a ruling in 1971 which found the Indianapolis Public Schools (IPS) district guilty of de jure racial segregation. Beginning in 1973, due to federal court mandates, some 7,000 African-American students began to be bused from the IPS district to neighboring township school corporations within Marion County. These townships included Decatur, Franklin, Perry, Warren, Wayne, and Lawrence townships. This practice continued on until 1998, when an agreement was reached between IPS and the United States Department of Justice to phase out inter-district, one-way busing. By 2005, the six township school districts no longer received any new IPS students.

== Re-segregation ==
According to the Civil Rights Project at Harvard University, the desegregation of U.S. public schools peaked in 1988; since then, schools have become more segregated because of changes in demographic residential patterns with continuing growth in suburbs and new communities. Jonathan Kozol has found that as of 2005, the proportion of black students at majority-white schools was at "a level lower than in any year since 1968". Changing population patterns, with dramatically increased growth in the South and Southwest, decreases in old industrial cities, and much increased immigration of new ethnic groups, have altered school populations in many areas.

School districts continue to try various programs to improve student and school performance, including magnet schools and special programs related to the economic standing of families. Omaha proposed incorporating some suburban districts within city limits to enlarge its school-system catchment area. It wanted to create a "one tax, one school" system that would also allow it to create magnet programs to increase diversity in now predominantly white schools. Ernest Chambers, a 34-year-serving black state senator from North Omaha, Nebraska, believed a different solution was needed. Some observers said that in practical terms, public schools in Omaha had been re-segregated since the end of busing in 1999.

In 2006, Chambers offered an amendment to the Omaha school reform bill in the Nebraska State Legislature which would provide for creation of three school districts in Omaha according to current racial demographics: black, white, and Hispanic, with local community control of each district. He believed this would give the black community the chance to control a district in which their children were the majority. Chambers' amendment was controversial. Opponents to the measure described it as "state-sponsored segregation".

The authors of a 2003 Harvard study on re-segregation believe current trends in the South of white teachers leaving predominantly black schools is an inevitable result of federal court decisions limiting former methods of civil rights-era protections, such as busing and affirmative action in school admissions. Teachers and principals cite other issues, such as economic and cultural barriers in schools with high rates of poverty, as well as teachers' choices to work closer to home or in higher-performing schools. In some areas black teachers are also leaving the profession, resulting in teacher shortages.

Education conservatives argue that any apparent separation of races is due to patterns of residential demographics not due to court decisions. They argue that the Brown decision has been achieved and that there is no segregation in the way that existed before the ruling. They further argue that employing race to impose desegregation policies discriminates and violates Brown's central warning of using racial preferences.

== See also ==
- Civil rights movement in Omaha, Nebraska
- Morgan v. Hennigan
- School segregation in the United States
