= Gary Middle College =

Location
- 131 East 5th Avenue; Gary, Indiana 46402; United States
- Coordinates: 41.601789°N 87.335087°W

Information
- Type: Public high school
- Principal: Joseph Arredondo
- Grades: 9-12
- Website: Official Website

Gary Middle College is a free public 9-12 charter school in Gary, Indiana. Gary Middle College is part of the GEO Foundation. The school has been opened since Fall 2011.

Other schools associated with the GEO Foundation are Fall Creek Academy, Fountain Square Academy, 21st Century Charter School of Gary, and Pikes Peak Prep.
