= Allen Whitehill Clowes Charitable Foundation =

Non-profit organization based in Indiana

- Abbreviation: AWCCF
- Named after: Allen W. Clowes
- Formation: 1990
- Headquarters: 320 North Meridian Street, Suite 900, Indianapolis, IN, 46204
- President: James Lemler
- Vice President: Elizabeth Kaznak-Hall
- Manager: Heidi Nikou
- Associate: Catherine Luce
- Website: https://www.awclowescf.org/

The Allen Whitehill Clowes Charitable Foundation (AWCCF) was established by Allen Whitehill Clowes (February 18, 1917 – November 3, 2000), who was an Indianapolis-based philanthropist who supported the arts and humanities. It was one of two funds named after and established by Clowes, the other being the Clowes Fund.

== History ==
Created in 1990, Clowes was the founder and first president up until his death in 2000. It started being funded by his estate afterward, beginning in 2002. Clowes was an officer of and commonly donated to museums and art organizations such as the Indianapolis Symphony Orchestra, the Indianapolis Chamber Orchestra, the Eiteljorg Museum, The Children's Museum and the Indianapolis Museum of Art. As well, donations and grants are made to Indianapolis Public Libraries and schools such as the Orchard School, and the Clowes Memorial Hall at Butler University.

Clowes Memorial Hall at Butler University was first built in 1963 with the help and funding of Allen Clowes and his wife. It was used by both the Indianapolis Symphony Orchestra until 1984, when the Orchestra moved to Hilbert Circle Theater.

== Charity ==
The AWCCF has several grant and funding programs for artists, organizations, and schools. Its total assets in 2024 was $173 million. Total expenses added up to about $18 million, with 93% of expenses being categorized as charity costs disbursed among 220 grants and groups. Expense history begins in 2001, due to Clowes having passed in 2000 and the full funding being available the year after.

In 2021, Butler University was given $1 million by the foundation to "modernize" the Clowes Memorial Hall, the base of Butler's Arts & Events Center. In 2024, the foundation donated another $9 million to the Memorial Hall for renovations.

The Orchard School, an early childhood education school, received $500k in 2025 for refining and creating outdoor learning centers. The Indiana Blind Children's Foundation (IBCF) have received previous grants and a $95,000 grant in 2025 for art and education. The Aurora Photocenter received a grant in 2025 for operating support as well.

"Music for All", a not-for-profit based on music, works with the AWCCF and advertises their grants. It collaborates with other organizations as well, such as the Indy Arts Council, Indiana Arts Commission and the Lilly Endowment.
