= Allen Whitehill Clowes =

Philanthropist from Indianapolis, US

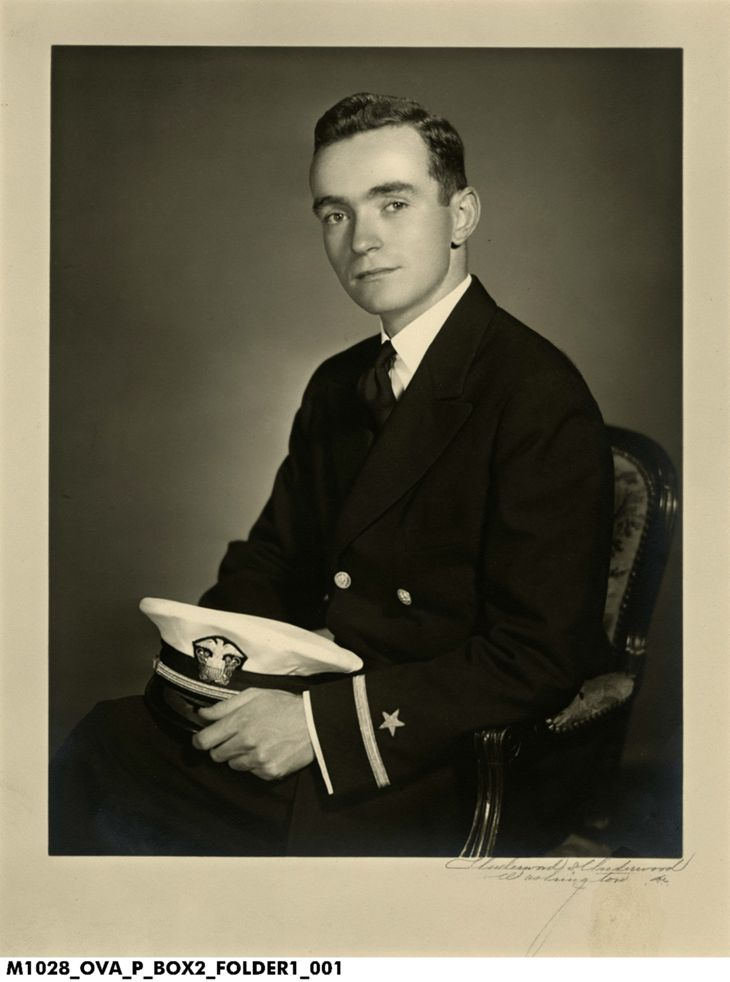
- Navy portrait of Allen W. Clowes
- Born: February 18, 1917; Buffalo, New York, US
- Died: November 3, 2000 (aged 83); Indianapolis, Indiana, US
- Known for: Philanthropy
- Notable work: The Allen Whitehill Clowes Foundation.

Allen Whitehill Clowes (February 18, 1917 – November 3, 2000) was an Indianapolis-based philanthropist in the 20th century. He provided both the funding and the namesakes of the Allen Whitehill Clowes Charitable Foundation (AWCCF) and the Clowes Fund, which was established for all of the Clowes family, not just Allen Whitehill Clowes.

== Early life and family ==
Clowes was born in Buffalo, New York, in 1917 to Dr. George and Mrs. Edith Clowes. His brother, Dr. George Henry Alexander Clowes Jr., was born 2 years earlier in 1915. His eldest brother, Alexander Temple Clowes, died in childhood. Their parents moved the two boys to Indianapolis in 1919 when Allen W. Clowes was 2 years old.

Dr. George H.A. Clowes Sr. became a research director at Eli Lilly and Co., and a founder of the American Association for Cancer Research (AACR). Dr. George H.A. Clowes Jr. also became a renowned surgeon for the AACR.

Edith Whitehill Hinkel Clowes was a philanthropist who founded the Orchard School with 8 other women, including Evelyn Fortune Lilly of the Eli Lilly family and Martha Carey Thomas.

== Education and philanthropy ==
Clowes attended the Orchard School as the first graduated class, due to his mother's part in founding the school. Later in his life, he graduated with a Bachelor of Arts and a Master's in Business Administration from Harvard. Harvard University now has an "Allen Whitehill Clowes Professor of Fine Arts and of African and African American Studies", named after Clowes, in the Departments of African and African American studies, History of Art and Architecture, and Medieval Studies. The position is currently filled by Suzanne Blier.

He was a Naval Officer during World War II. Due to his service, he was given honorary doctorates (honoris causa) from Marian University, Butler University, and Franklin College. The Allen Whitehill Clowes Amphitheater at Marian University and the Clowes Memorial Hall at Butler University were named after him. He was, temporarily, a financier for Brown Brothers Harriman in New York as he lived there for a time. Clowes was also a chair member and officer of several museums, such as the IMA/Newfields, the Indianapolis Symphony Orchestra, the Eiteljorg Museum, and more. He established the AWCCF in 1990. This was done independently of the Clowes Fund. The AWCCF is funded by his estate, beginning after his passing in 2000.

Allen Clowes was placed in charge of the Clowes Fund, a collection of art collected by the family, as president and treasurer. The fund was established in 1952 and he became president after his father passed in 1958. The Indianapolis Museum of Art (IMA) was given the Clowes family's art collection on loan, before permanently being given the collection in 1999. Since 2023, all of the art pieces are presented in the Clowes Pavilion, built in 1972 and renovated in 2022.

Clowes was married only once, for less than a year before getting divorced. He never remarried and had no children.
