= NBHS =

NBHS may refer to schools named:

In Canada:

- New Brunswick Historical Society, Saint John, New Brunswick

In Scotland:

- North Berwick High School, East Lothian

In England:

- North Bromsgrove High School, Worcestershire

In Australia:

- Newcastle Boys' High School, New South Wales
- Normanhurst Boys High School, New South Wales

In New Zealand:

- Napier Boys' High School, Hawke's Bay

In the United States:

- Needham B. Broughton High School, North Carolina
- New Bedford High School, Massachusetts
- New Beginnings High School, Indiana
- New Braunfels High School, Texas
- New Britain High School, Connecticut
- New Brunswick High School, New Jersey
- North Bend High School (Oregon), Oregon
- North Bergen High School, New Jersey
- North Brookfield High School, Massachusetts
- North Buncombe High School, North Carolina
- North Babylon High School, New York
