= Ben Davis High School =

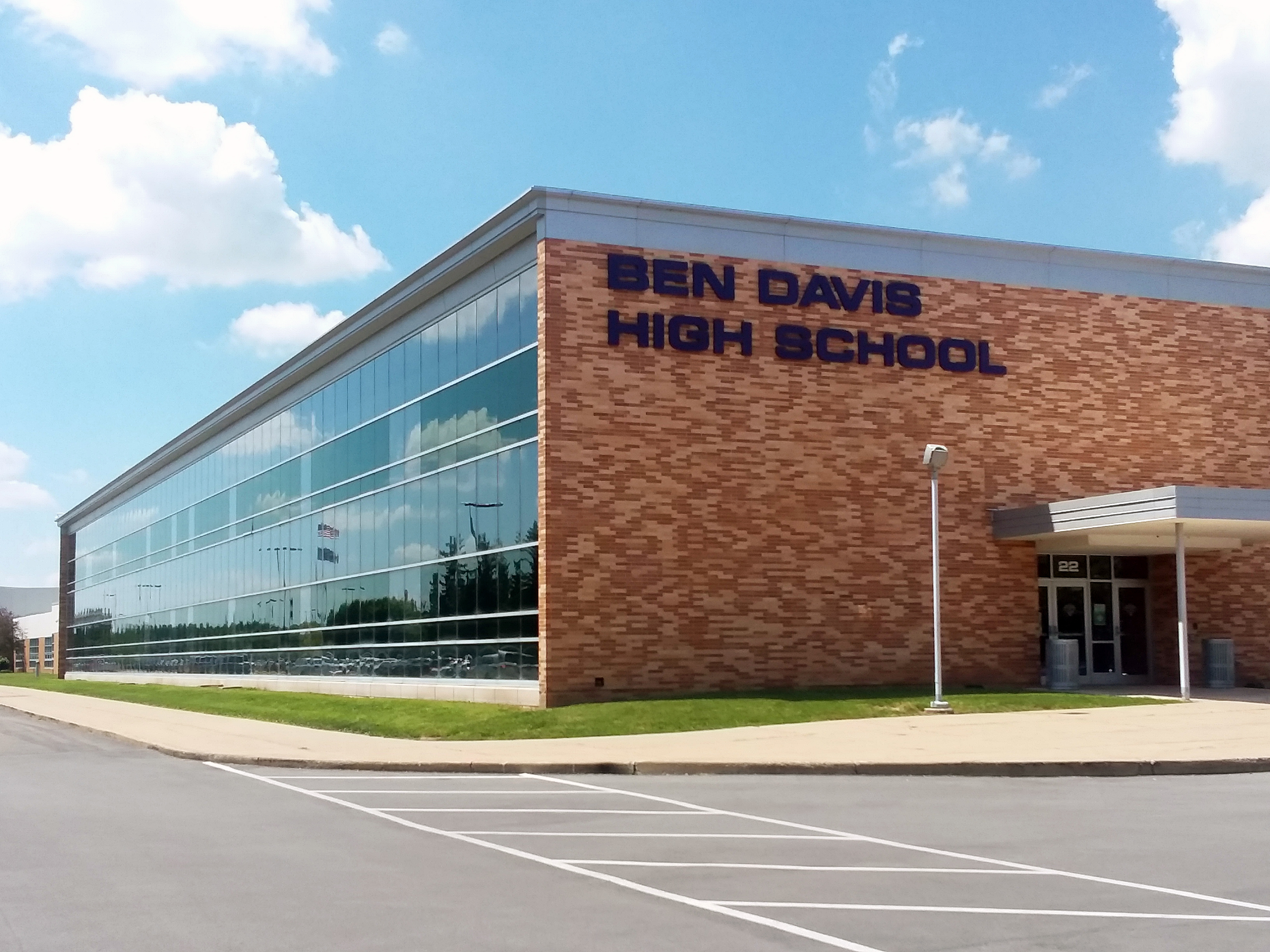

Location
- 1200 North Girls School Road; Indianapolis, Marion County, Indiana 46214; United States; 39°47′5.00″N 86°17′27.00″W

Information
- Type: Public high school
- Motto: Every Child Everyday Achieving Success in Every Way
- Established: 1892
- Locale: Large city
- School district: Metropolitan School District of Wayne Township
- Principal: Sandra Squire
- Teaching staff: 180.33 (FTE)
- Grades: 10–12
- Enrollment: 3,274 (2023–2024)
- Student to teacher ratio: 18.16
- Colors: Purple and white
- Athletics conference: Metropolitan Interscholastic Conference
- Team name: Giants
- Website: BDHS

Ben Davis High School (BDHS) is a three-year high school in Indianapolis, Indiana.

== History ==
Ben Davis was first established in 1892. The current school building was constructed in 1965. The school underwent extensive construction and renovation from 1998 to 2002 and experienced another addition of more classrooms which was completed prior to the 2007/2008 school year. With the newly opened Ninth Grade Center, the school boasts over 1,000,000 square feet (93,000 m^{2}) under one continuous roof.

The school is named for the 1880s Vandalia Railroad executive Benjamin Davis. He was instrumental in getting a stop on the railroad for a small community that would come to bear his name. The community members were so appreciative of Davis's efforts that they named the stop after him. The community around the stop became known as "Ben Davis".

The first Ben Davis High School was built in 1892. That school was replaced in the early 20th century by a bigger building at the corner of what is now Morris Street and High School Road. During the Great Depression, a larger school was built just up the road as part of the Works Progress Administration. Ben Davis High School remained in that location until the current building was established in 1965. The old Ben Davis Junior High School was renovated and now serves as Ben Davis University High School.

Ben Davis High School has received the Blue Ribbon School of Excellence award from the United States Department of Education.

The school is part of the Metropolitan School District of Wayne Township.

== Athletics ==
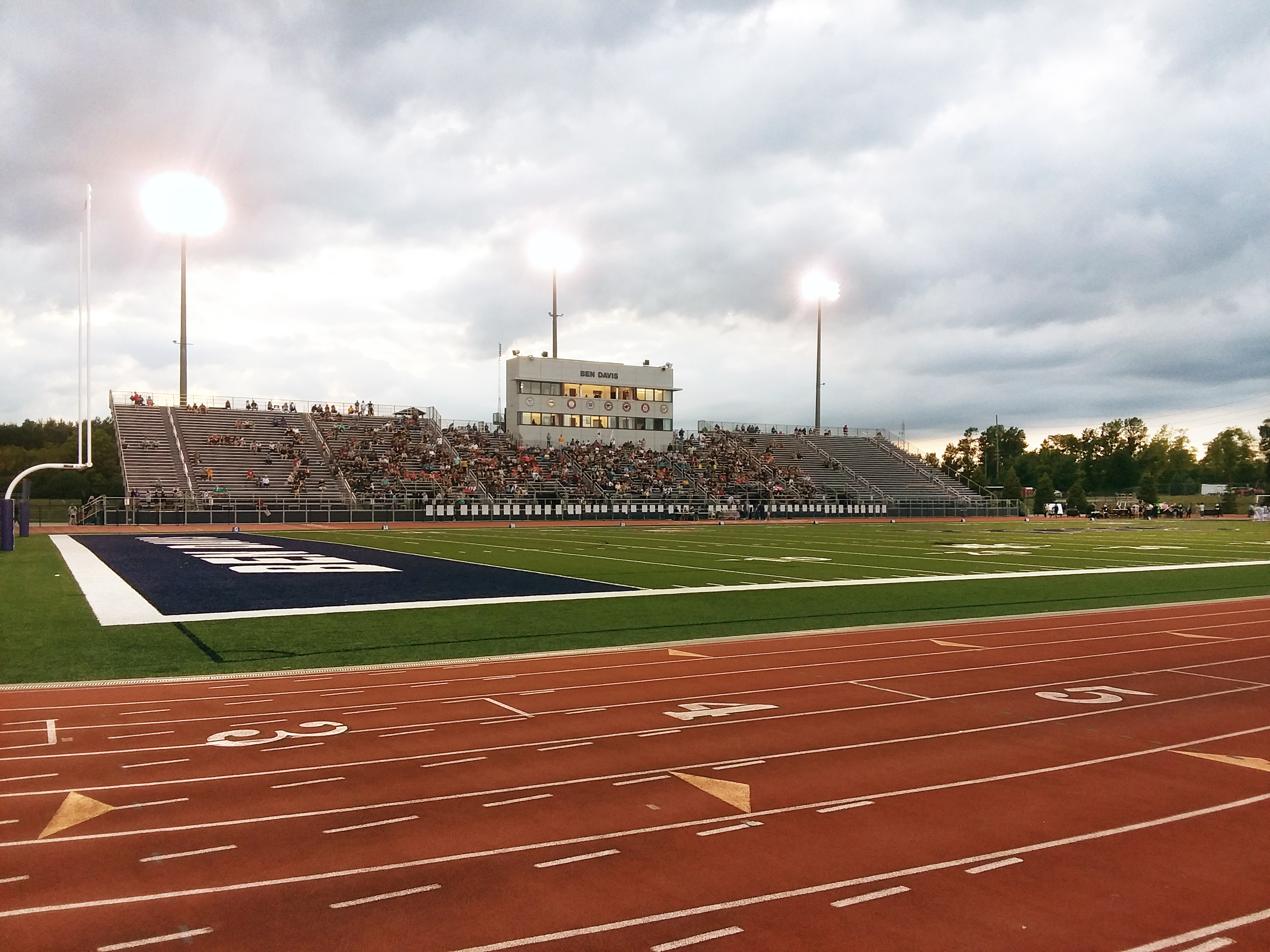
Ben Davis High School football/track stadium

Ben Davis High School has won multiple state championships under the Indiana High School Athletic Association (IHSAA). They have won a total of 30 IHSAA state championships:

- Ten in Football (1987, 1988, 1990, 1991, 1999, 2001, 2002, 2014, 2017, 2023);
- Four in Cross Country (1962, 1989, 1990, 1995);
- Three in Girls' Swimming (1978, 1979, 1980),
- Four in Girls' Basketball (2000, 2001, 2009, 2010);
- Four in Boys' Basketball (1995, 1996, 2017, 2023);
- Three in Boys' Track and Field (2008, 2009,2010);
- Volleyball in 1979;
- Baseball in 1981;
- Boys' Golf in 1992

Ben Davis High School is a member of the Metropolitan Interscholastic Conference, which is known as one of the most competitive conferences in the Midwest. The team's nickname is the Giants. The 2008/2009 Lady Giants basketball team finished the season ranked number one in the nation by USA Today's Top 25 poll and ESPN's Rise Poll. This marks the third team national championship in school history. Boys' Track and Field 2009 being the second and the 1991 football team was national champion in the former ESPN/Scholastic Sports America poll, as well as the National Prep Poll and National Sports News Service Poll.

In 2023, the boys' basketball team became the 14th team in state history to finish the season undefeated, finishing with a 33–0 record.

== Academic clubs ==
The school also has a speech, debate, journalism, and communications program. Ben Davis is home to WBDG Giant 90.9 FM, a 400-Watt FM radio station operated by students. WBDG went on the air in 1966 and continues to broadcast today 24 hours, 7 days per week. BDHS publishes a student yearbook called Keyhole, Giant Visions, a literary magazine, and a student newspaper, Spotlight. In 2003, the school re-launched BDTV, a video production house, within the Area 31 Career Center where students produce a weekly school newscast and a variety of other video productions for the township.

Ben Davis provides a career center which provides vocational training and serves ten regional schools, (Avon High School, Brownsburg High School, Cascade High School, Danville Community High School, Decatur Central High School, Monrovia High School, Mooresville Consolidated High School, Plainfield High School, Speedway High School, Tri-West High School).

The school has been authorized to offer the International Baccalaureate Diploma Programme.

== Performing arts ==
The Ben Davis Marching Giants have traveled across the country on invitation to march in various parades and festivals, including the King Kamehameha parade in Honolulu, Hawaii, the Macy's Thanksgiving Day Parade in New York City, the Tournament of Roses Parade in Pasadena, California and The Inaugural Parade for President Reagan Jan. 1985 in Washington DC. The band has also won numerous Indiana state titles, finishing first in the Indiana state competition in 1976, 1977, 1982, 1984–88, and 1993. Also, the band has had success on the national level, finishing ninth in the Bands of America National Marching Band Competition in 1981 and second in 1982, and finishing ninth and tenth in the Bands of America Grand National Championships in 2004 and 2008, respectively. In 2012, the Marching Giants traveled to Pasadena to again represent Ben Davis High School in the Tournament of Roses Parade. The Marching Giants were also the champions at the Indiana State Fair Band Day five times in 1960, 1961, 1964, 1966, and 1967.

In 2014, the Ben Davis Winter Guard won the school's first IHSCGA Open Class State Championship. The guard were repeat champions in 2015.

Ben Davis has three competitive choirs. "Purple-Aires" is an advanced concert choir that has been named grand champion at numerous competitions throughout the years. "Premiers" is a mixed show choir which consistently places in the top five at area competitions. In 2010, the "Premiers" attended the ISSMA Choir State Championships where they placed 2nd overall and won the best vocal sound caption award. "Sounds," formerly known as "Soundsations," is a women's show choir. "Sounds" placed second at the 2010 ISSMA State Show Choir State Championships. Sounds were named ISSMA Women's Show Choir State Champions at the 2011 and 2013 championships.

Ben Davis' Theatre Department is expanding, increasing their season to include four shows throughout the year. In the 2008–2009 school year, they were invited to perform in Edinburgh, Scotland at the Edinburgh Fringe Festival, and in 2009, they performed for the first time in the Indy Fringe Festival.

== Notable alumni ==
- Aaron Henry - professional basketball player
- Alex Bentley - WNBA player for Connecticut Sun
- Anthony Boswell – college football center for the Houston Cougars
- Asmar Bilal - American football linebacker
- Bill Warren - former president of Monster.com
- David Blackburn - football scout and executive
- Carolene Mays - Indiana House of Representatives from the 94th district (2002–2008)
- Chris Evans - running back for NFL's Cincinnati Bengals
- Corey Harris - NFL safety for Detroit Lions, Baltimore Ravens, Miami Dolphins, Seattle Seahawks, Green Bay Packers and Houston Oilers
- Danielle Cuttino - professional volleyball player, member of U.S. national team.
- David R. Oliver Jr. - former executive vice president of the European Aeronautic Defense and Space Company
- Dawand Jones - NFL offensive tackle for the Cleveland Browns
- Don Gummer - sculptor and husband of acclaimed actress Meryl Streep
- Esezi Otomewo - NFL defensive tackle
- Henry Williams - professional basketball player and for UNC-Charlotte
- Kenneth L. Peek Jr. - Former Commander Eighth Air Force
- Kevin Calabro - former play-by-play announcer for the NBA's Portland Trail Blazers and Seattle SuperSonics
- Kristi Lee - radio personality on The Bob & Tom Show
- Lauren (Cheney) Holiday - soccer player, United States women's national soccer team, 2008 and 2012 Olympic gold medalist
- Marcus Adams - Defensive Tackle in the Canadian Football League
- Mark Crawford - Defensive Lineman in the Indoor Football League
- MarQueis Gray - tight end for NFL's Miami Dolphins, also played for Buffalo Bills, Minnesota Vikings and Cleveland Browns
- Morten Andersen (b. 1960) - Hall of Fame NFL kicker for Atlanta Falcons, Minnesota Vikings, Kansas City Chiefs, New York Giants and New Orleans Saints
- Randy Wittman - former head coach of NBA's Washington Wizards, Minnesota Timberwolves, Cleveland Cavaliers; played for Indiana Pacers, Sacramento Kings and Atlanta Hawks and for 1981 NCAA champion Indiana Hoosiers
- Reese Taylor-CB currently Denver Broncos.
- Robert Behning - member of Indiana House of Representatives from 91st district
- Shyra Ely - WNBA player for Indiana Fever, Chicago Sky, Seattle Storm and San Antonio Silver Stars
- Stanley Burrell - former professional basketball player
- Steve Allee - Jazz musician and composer
- Tandon Doss - professional football player for Jacksonville Jaguars and Baltimore Ravens
- Troy Paino - 10th president of the University of Mary Washington.

== School partnerships ==
Country	School Name	Partner since	Comments
Germany	Gymnasium Letmathe Iserlohn	2009	First visit from Germany: October and November 2009. First stay in Germany: March and April 2010.
USA	Vincennes University	2007	Ben Davis University High School was formed through a partnership between Vincennes University and the Metropolitan School district of Wayne Township. Ben Davis University High School students have the opportunity to earn both their Core40 high school diploma and their associate degree from Vincennes University. Degrees Offered include: Associates of General Studies Degree - Liberal Arts; Associates of General Studies Degree - Business Management; Associates of General Studies Degree - Information Technology; Associates of General Studies Degree - Health Careers

== See also ==
- List of schools in Indianapolis
- List of high schools in Indiana
