= WBDG =

Indianapolis, Indiana; United States
- Broadcast area: Indianapolis area
- Frequency: 90.9 MHz (HD Radio)
- Branding: Giant 90.9 FM

Programming
- Format: Variety

Ownership
- Owner: Metropolitan School District of Wayne Township

History
- First air date: February 14, 1966

Technical information
- Facility ID: 41317
- Class: A
- ERP: 400 watts
- HAAT: 24.0 meters (78.7 ft)
- Transmitter coordinates: 39°47′5.00″N 86°17′27.00″W

Links
- Website: WBDG Website

WBDG (90.9 FM) is a high school radio station broadcasting a Variety format from Ben Davis High School in Indianapolis, Indiana, United States. The station is currently owned by Metropolitan School District of Wayne Township.

WBDG broadcasts in the HD Radio format.

== History ==
WBDG is one of the first radio stations in Marion County to be owned by a school system and operated by the students of that system. A construction permit was obtained to build a tower on top of the newly constructed "new" Ben Davis High School in September 1965, and, on February 14, 1966, WBDG came to life with its first regular broadcasting day. The station had a radiated power of just 10 watts.

Early programming on WBDG consisted of a modest schedule of educational programs aimed at the township elementary schools, community news and a lunch-time dance party. The station broadcast only during school hours and on athletic event nights. Competition for the handful of disc jockey slots each week was very fierce.

In the early 1970s, station management applied for and was granted a power increase. The station's radiated power was upped to 320 watts. Channel six (WRTV) insisted that WBDG move its antenna and transmitter to the tower farm near St. Vincent Hospital on Indy's Northside. The new transmission location proved undesirable as the station could barely be received in its own control room. In 1979, the FCC granted the petition to move the station back to Ben Davis. Part of the FCC's construction permit was to increase WBDG's radiated power to 400 watts. A 78-foot (24 m) tower was built on the school roof, and the transmitter was moved to a fan room on the second floor of the building.

As the 1970s waned, WBDG began to add after school radio shows. Pop music and rock started to air. By 1979, WBDG was broadcasting 15 hours per day, five days per week and from 9:00 AM-Midnight on Saturday and Sunday. Student operators even kept the station on the air on holidays such as Thanksgiving and Christmas with no automation system.

During the days of disco, WBDG earned a few ratings points in one of the books. WBDG was the only disco station in Indianapolis. A few of WBDG's staff members had also gotten an advertising agency to donate to WBDG 35 billboard advertisements. “Disco 91” billboards were across the city. When disco died, WBDG adopted a popular music and rock format. In 1986, the station was granted its current stereo license after raising the money for stereo broadcast equipment in a first-ever WBDG Radio Marathon.

In the early 1990s, popular music was shifting toward an increasingly esoteric and unconventional bent. In emphasis of this expanding scope of sound in the mainstream, WBDG adopted the moniker "The Radio Spectrum". Some of the most dynamic set lists of this era came from a show entitled "Whatnot", an innovative modern rock show pioneered by student Jennifer Collins. In 1995, WBDG expanded to 24 hours a day, every day. On June 1, 2002, WBDG re-launched as Giant 90.9.

In July 2020, the FCC granted an eight-year license renewal that will not expire until 2028. WBDG began broadcasting in both analog and HD Radio in January 2018.

== Station broadcasting information ==
The station broadcasts with 0.4 kilowatts of both vertical and horizontal power at 78 feet (24 m) of height above average terrain serving primarily Western Marion and Eastern Hendricks Counties. The station is licensed to Indianapolis. More information can be found on the FCC's search page for WBDG-FM

== Programming ==
WBDG is a student radio station playing a wide range of musical artists and genres. WBDG plays national and local artists. During the school year, the station's student broadcasters host radio shows with different themes. Station management determines the rest of the automated and daily live programming following a variety format concentrating on music of the last 10 years to today. WBDG airs a program called Radio Goethe on Sundays at 7:00 p.m. The station also broadcasts up to eight hours of dance and techno music on its Giant Mix program. The show airs until 4:00 a.m. nightly. Sundays are reserved for music from the 1970s through the late 1990s on Retro Sunday.

Emerson Allen hosts School Talk with Emerson. This is a weekly 30-minute talk show that is broadcast August–May on WBDG at 7:00 a.m. on Friday mornings. The program also highlights school functions, clubs, and activities. Local politicians also frequently appear on the show It is produced by WBDG students and replays on Sundays at 2:00 p.m.

Each spring, WBDG celebrates its history on the airwaves with a marathon broadcast. This is a major fundraiser for the non-commercial station.

WBDG also broadcasts a variety of Ben Davis High School and area sporting events.

== Famous alumni ==
- Kristi Lee - The Bob and Tom Show, Kristi Lee: Uninterrupted
- Kevin Calabro - American Basketball broadcaster (NBA's Portland Trail Blazers)
- David Calabro - WTHR Channel 13, Indianapolis Sports Director and Indianapolis Motor Speedway Indianapolis 500 PA Announcer
- Kevin Gregory - WRTV Channel 6, Indianapolis Chief Meteorologist
- Kevin Lee - WFNI Trackside host, Westwood One NFL Play-by-Play Announcer, IndyCar broadcaster on NBCSN
- Scott Hoke - WFYI, Indianapolis
- Liz Dixon - WTLC, Indianapolis
- Garrison King - KGGI, Riverside
- Dana Webb - Former Country Music Association CMA Disc Jockey of the Year
- Jeff Lewis - Former WKLU, 101.9 FM, Indianapolis
- DJ Marcus - House DJ at the Vogue, Broad Ripple, Indiana
- Tommy Mason - CBS 44 WEVV, Evansville, Indiana
- Crystal McKenzie - Former WKLU, 101.9 FM, Indianapolis, current WFBQ, 94.7 FM, Midday Host
- Paul Mendenhall (former teacher, Station Manager) - WTTS, 92.3 FM, Indianapolis Morning Show Host
- Linda Allen - WJTV Channel 12, Jackson, Mississippi Anchor/Reporter
- Brett Patterson - Former Indycar analyst for examiner.com; founder of www.thejerksinthebackrow.com
- Dennis Wallace - President and Owner, Mid-Missouri Media, Inc. Group Station Owner & Managing Partner Broadcast Consulting Firm Meintel, Sgrignoli, & Wallace, LLC.
- Kurt Darling - WIBC News Anchor
- Ron Miner - "DJ Indiana Jones"
- Corey Clark - DLC Media
- Dontre Graves - IndyCar
