= Harrison College =

Harrison College may refer to:

- Harrison College (Barbados), a secondary school established in 1733 in Barbados
- Harrison College (Indiana), a former for-profit college based in Indiana
