= List of school districts in Indiana =

The following is a list of school districts in Indiana.

There are several classifications of school districts in Indiana. All are counted as separate governments as per the U.S. Census Bureau. Indiana has no school systems dependent on other layers of government.

== Adams County ==
- Adams Central Community Schools
- North Adams Community Schools
- South Adams Schools

== Allen County ==
- East Allen County Schools
- Fort Wayne Community Schools
- Northwest Allen County Schools
- Southwest Allen County Schools

== Bartholomew County ==
- Bartholomew Consolidated School Corporation
- Flat Rock-Hawcreek School Corporation

== Boone County ==
- Lebanon Community School Corporation
- Western Boone County Community School Dist
- Zionsville Community Schools

== Carroll County ==
- Carroll Consolidated School Corporation
- Delphi Community School Corporation

== Cass County ==
- Lewis Cass Schools
- Logansport Community School Corporation
- Pioneer Regional School Corporation

== Clark County ==
- Borden–Henryville School Corporation
- Clarksville Community School Corporation
- Greater Clark County Schools
- Silver Creek School Corporation

== Clinton County ==
- Clinton Central School Corporation
- Clinton Prairie School Corporation
- Community Schools of Frankfort
- Rossville Consolidated School District

== Daviess County ==
- Barr-Reeve Community Schools
- North Daviess Community Schools
- Washington Community Schools

== Dearborn County ==
- Lawrenceburg Community School Corporation
- South Dearborn Community School Corporation
- Sunman-Dearborn Community School Corporation

== Decatur County ==
- Decatur County Community Schools
- Greensburg Community Schools

== DeKalb County ==
- DeKalb County Central United School District
- DeKalb County Eastern Community School District
- Garrett-Keyser-Butler Community School District
- Hamilton Community Schools

== Delaware County ==
=== Laboratory ===
- Burris Laboratory School
- Indiana Academy for Science, Mathematics, and Humanities

=== Public ===
- Cowan Community School Corporation
- Daleville Community Schools
- Delaware Community School Corporation
- Liberty-Perry Community School Corporation
- Muncie Community Schools
- Wes-Del Community Schools Corporation
- Yorktown Community Schools

== Dubois County ==
- Greater Jasper Consolidated Schools
- Northeast Dubois County School Corporation
- Southeast Dubois County School Corporation
- Southwest Dubois County School Corporation

== Elkhart County ==
- Baugo Community Schools
- Concord Community Schools
- Elkhart Community Schools
- Fairfield Community Schools
- Goshen Community Schools
- Middlebury Community Schools
- Wa-Nee Community Schools

== Floyd County ==
- New Albany-Floyd County Consolidated School Corporation

== Fountain County ==
- Attica Consolidated School Corporation
- Covington Community School Corporation
- Southeast Fountain School Corporation

== Franklin County ==
- Batesville Community School Corporation
- Franklin County Community School Corporation

== Fulton County ==
- Caston School Corporation
- Rochester Community School Corporation

== Gibson County ==
- East Gibson School Corporation
- North Gibson School Corporation
- South Gibson School Corporation

== Grant County ==
- Eastbrook Community School Corporation
- Madison-Grant United School Corporation
- Marion Community Schools
- Mississinewa Community School Corporation
- Oak Hill United School Corporation

== Greene County ==
- Bloomfield School District
- Eastern Greene Schools
- Linton-Stockton School Corporation
- Metropolitan School District of Shakamak Schools
- White River Valley School District

== Hamilton County ==
- Carmel Clay Schools
- Hamilton Heights School Corporation
- Hamilton Southeastern Schools
- Noblesville Schools
- Sheridan Community Schools
- Westfield Washington Schools

== Hancock County ==
- Eastern Hancock County Community School Corporation
- Greenfield-Central Community Schools
- Mount Vernon Community School Corporation
- Southern Hancock County Community School Corporation

== Harrison County ==
- Lanesville Community School Corporation
- North Harrison Community School Corporation
- South Harrison Community Schools

== Hendricks County ==
- Avon Community School Corporation
- Brownsburg Community School Corporation
- Danville Community School Corporation
- Mill Creek Community School Corporation
- North West Hendricks Schools
- Plainfield Community School Corporation

== Henry County ==
- Blue River Valley Schools
- C.A. Beard Memorial School Corporation
- New Castle Community School Corporation
- Shenandoah School Corporation
- South Henry School Corporation

== Howard County ==
- Eastern Howard School Corporation
- Kokomo-Center Township Consolidated School Corporation
- Northwestern School Corporation
- Taylor Community School Corporation
- Western School Corporation

== Jackson County ==
- Brownstown Central Community School Corporation
- Crothersville Community Schools
- Medora Community School Corporation
- Seymour Community Schools

== Jasper County ==
- Kankakee Valley School Corporation
- Rensselaer Central School Corporation

== Jefferson County ==
- Madison Consolidated Schools
- Southwestern Jefferson County Consolidated Schools

== Johnson County ==
- Center Grove Community School Corporation
- Central Nine Career Center
- Clark-Pleasant Community School Corporation
- Edinburgh Community School Corporation
- Franklin Community School Corporation
- Greenwood Community School Corporation
- Nineveh-Hensley-Jackson United School Corporation

== Knox County ==
- North Knox School Corporation
- South Knox School Corporation
- Twin Rivers Career Education Area
- Vincennes Community School Corporation

== Kosciusko County ==
- Tippecanoe Valley School Corporation
- Warsaw Community Schools
- Wawasee Community School Corporation

== LaGrange County ==
- Lakeland School Corporation
- Prairie Heights Community School Corporation
- Westview School Corporation

== Lake County ==
- Crown Point Community School Corporation
- Gary Community School Corporation
- Griffith Public Schools
- Hanover Community School Corporation
- Lake Central School Corporation
- Lake Ridge Schools Corporation
- Lake Station Community Schools
- Merrillville Community School Corporation
- River Forest Community School Corporation
- School City of East Chicago
- School City of Hammond
- School City of Hobart
- School City of Whiting
- School Town of Highland
- School Town of Munster
- Tri-Creek School Corporation

== LaPorte County ==
- LaPorte Community School Corporation
- Metropolitan School District of New Durham Township
- Michigan City Area Schools
- New Prairie United School Corporation
- South Central Community School Corporation
- Tri-Township Consolidated School Corporation

== Lawrence County ==
- Mitchell Community Schools
- North Lawrence Community Schools

== Madison County ==
- Alexandria Community School Corporation
- Anderson Community School Corporation
- Elwood Community School Corporation
- Frankton-Lapel Community Schools
- South Madison Community School Corporation

== Marion County ==
- Beech Grove City Schools
- Franklin Township Community School Corporation
- Indianapolis Public Schools
- Irvington Community School
- Metropolitan School District of Decatur Township
- Metropolitan School District of Lawrence Township
- Metropolitan School District of Pike Township
- Metropolitan School District of Warren Township
- Metropolitan School District of Washington Township
- Metropolitan School District of Wayne Township
- Perry Township Schools
- School Town of Speedway

== Marshall County ==
- Argos Community Schools
- Bremen Public Schools
- Culver Community School Corporation
- Plymouth Community School Corporation
- Triton School Corporation

== Martin County ==
- Loogootee Community School Corporation
- Shoals Community School Corporation

== Miami County ==
- Maconaquah School Corporation
- North Miami Community Schools
- Peru Community Schools

== Monroe County ==
- Monroe County Community School Corporation
- Richland-Bean Blossom Community School Corporation

== Montgomery County ==
- Crawfordsville Community Schools
- North Montgomery Community School Corporation
- South Montgomery Community School Corporation

== Morgan County ==
- Eminence Community School Corporation
- Metropolitan School District of Martinsville
- Monroe-Gregg School District
- Mooresville Consolidated School Corporation

== Newton County ==
- North Newton School Corporation
- South Newton School Corporation

== Noble County ==
- Central Noble Community School Corporation
- East Noble School Corporation
- West Noble School Corporation

== Orange County ==
- Lost River Career Cooperative
- Orleans Community Schools
- Paoli Community School Corporation
- Springs Valley Community School Corporation

== Parke County ==
- North Central Parke Community School Corporation
- Southwest Parke Community School Corporation

== Perry County ==
- Cannelton City Schools
- Southport Middle School
- Tell Perry Meridian Middle School

== Porter County ==
- Duneland School Corporation
- East Porter County School Corporation
- Metropolitan School District of Boone Township
- Portage Township Schools
- Porter Township School Corporation
- Union Township School Corporation
- Valparaiso Community Schools

== Posey County ==
- Metropolitan School District of Mount Vernon and South Posey County Schools
- Metropolitan School District of North Posey County Schools

== Pulaski County ==
- Eastern Pulaski Community School Corporation
- West Central School Corporation

== Putnam County ==
- Area 30 Career Center
- Cloverdale Community Schools
- Greencastle Community School Corporation
- North Putnam Community Schools
- South Putnam Community Schools

== Randolph County ==
- Monroe Central School Corporation
- Randolph Central School Corporation
- Randolph Eastern School Corporation
- Randolph Southern School Corporation
- Union School Corporation

== Ripley County ==
- Jac-Cen-Del Community School Corporation
- Milan Community Schools
- South Ripley Community School Corporation
- Southeastern Career Center

== St. Joseph County ==
- John Glenn School Corporation
- Penn-Harris-Madison School Corporation
- School City of Mishawaka
- South Bend Community School Corporation
- Union-North United Schools

== Scott County ==
- Scott County School District 1
- Scott County School District 2

== Shelby County ==
- Blue River Career Programs
- Northwestern Consolidated School Corporation
- Shelby Eastern Schools
- Shelbyville Central Schools
- Southwestern Consolidated School District of Shelby County

== Spencer County ==
- North Spencer County School Corporation
- South Spencer County School Corporation

== Starke County ==
- Knox Community School Corporation
- North Judson-San Pierre School Corporation
- Oregon-Davis School Corporation

== Steuben County ==
- Fremont Community Schools
- Metropolitan School District of Steuben County

== Sullivan County ==
- Dugger Union School Corporation
- Northeast School Corporation of Sullivan County
- Southwest School Corporation of Sullivan County

== Tippecanoe County ==
- Lafayette School Corporation
- Tippecanoe School Corporation
- West Lafayette Community School Corporation

== Tipton County ==
- Tipton Community School Corporation
- Tri-Central Community Schools Corporation

== Vermillion County ==
- North Vermillion Community School Corporation
- South Vermillion Community School Corporation

== Wabash County ==
- Heartland Career Center
- Manchester Community Schools
- Metropolitan School District of Wabash County Schools
- Wabash City Schools

== Washington County ==
- East Washington School Corporation
- Salem Community Schools
- West Washington School Corporation

== Wayne County ==
- Centerville-Abington Community Schools
- Nettle Creek School Corporation
- Northeastern Wayne Schools
- Richmond Community Schools
- Western Wayne Schools

== Wells County ==
- Metropolitan School District of Bluffton-Harrison
- Northern Wells Community Schools
- Southern Wells Community Schools

== White County ==
- Frontier School Corporation
- North White School Corporation
- Tri-County School Corporation
- Twin Lakes School Corporation

== Whitley County ==
- Smith–Green Community Schools
- Whitko Community School Corporation
- Whitley County Consolidated Schools

== Single-District Counties ==
- Benton Community School Corporation
- Blackford County Schools
- Brown County School Corporation
- Clay Community Schools
- Crawford County Community School Corporation
- Evansville Vanderburgh School Corporation (Vanderburgh County)
- Fayette County School Corporation
- New Albany-Floyd County Consolidated School Corporation (Floyd County)
- Huntington County Community School Corporation
- Jay School Corporation
- Jennings County Schools
- Pike County School Corporation
- Rising Sun-Ohio County Community School Corporation
- Rush County Schools
- Spencer-Owen Community Schools (Owen County)
- Switzerland County School Corporation
- Union County/College Corner Joint School District
- Vigo County School Corporation
- Metropolitan School District of Warren County
- Warrick County School Corporation

== Former school districts ==
Former school districts in Indiana include hundreds of school corporations, township schools, and city systems that have been abolished or consolidated since the mid-19th century. The most significant period of dissolution occurred between 1959 and 1968 following the passage of the School Reorganization Act of 1959, which sought to modernize education by merging smaller, often township-based districts into larger units with better funding and curriculum standards.

=== History and Legislation ===
In the early 20th century, Indiana's educational system was highly decentralized. Governance was largely the responsibility of township trustees, leading to a system of nearly 1,000 small districts, many of which operated only one-room schoolhouses.

Notable Former Indiana School Districts
Former District	County	Year Dissolved	Successor District(s)
New Harmony Town & Twp. Cons. Schools	Posey	2012	MSD of Mt. Vernon
Turkey Run Community School Corp.	Parke	2013	North Central Parke Community School Corp
Rockville Community School Corp.	Parke	2013	North Central Parke Community School Corp
West Clark Community Schools	Clark	2020	Silver Creek Schools; Borden-Henryville Schools
Union School Corporation	Randolph	2027 (Planned)	Blue River Valley; Monroe Central

== See also ==
- Indiana Department of Education
- List of high schools in Indiana
