= College Park Elementary School =

College Park Elementary School can refer to elementary schools in the contiguous United States and to an elementary school in Port Moody, British Columbia, Canada, which is part of School District No. 43 and seems to be unused as of 2024 January but was apparently used as recently as 2014:

- College Park Elementary School in Costa Mesa, California - Newport-Mesa Unified School District
- College Park Elementary School in Irvine, California - Irvine Unified School District
- College Park Elementary School in Ocala, Florida - Marion County Public Schools
- College Park Elementary School in College Park, Georgia - Fulton County Schools
- College Park Elementary School in Indianapolis, Indiana - Metropolitan School District of Pike Township
- College Park Elementary School in College Park, Maryland - Prince George's County Public Schools
- College Park Elementary School in Wilmington, North Carolina
- College Park Elementary School in Ladson, South Carolina - Berkeley County School District
- College Park Elementary School in Deer Park, Texas - La Porte Independent School District
- College Park Elementary School in Virginia Beach, Virginia
