= Irvington Community School =

School corporation in Indianapolis, Indiana, US

Coordinates: 39°46′09.5″N 86°03′08.0″W

Irvington Community Schools
- 5751 E University Ave, Indianapolis, Indiana 46219

Information
- Type: Charter School
- Established: 2001
- Grades: K-12
- Enrollment: 959 (2022–23)
- Colors: Royal Blue & Black
- Mascot: Ravens

Irvington Community Schools is a K–12 charter school corporation located in the Irvington Historic District of Indianapolis, Indiana. Originally Chartered by Ball State University, ICS, Inc is currently chartered by the Indianapolis Mayor's Office of Education Innovation.

ICS, Inc. provides a liberal arts focus: all students K–12 participate weekly in Physical Education, Music, an Art program, and Foreign Language.

Irvington Community Schools Inc.'s three schools are each, by design, small community schools:

- Irvington Community Elementary School has three classes per grade level (K–5) and serves just over 400 students;
- Irvington Community Middle School (grades 6–8) serves approximately 240 students;
- Irvington Preparatory Academy (grades 9–12) enrolls approximately 340 high school students.

In 2009, the school was awarded the Maestro Award from the Indianapolis Symphony Orchestra. Also, 7 of the school's students had art featured on display at the Indiana State Museum through the Symphony in Color competition by the Indianapolis Symphony Orchestra which represented the greatest number of honors for a single school.

== See also ==
- List of schools in Indianapolis
- List of charter schools in Indiana
- List of school districts in Indiana
