= Indianapolis Metropolitan High School =

Location
- 1635 West Michigan Street; Indianapolis, Marion County, Indiana 46222; United States; 39°46′25″N 86°11′29″W

Information
- Type: Public charter high school
- Established: August 23, 2004
- Principal: Shannon Brown
- Faculty: 25
- Grades: 9-12
- Enrollment: 299 (2013-2014)
- Color
- Athletics conference: Independent
- Team name: Pumas
- Website: IMHS

Indianapolis Metropolitan High School, known as "Indy Met" for short, is a public charter high school in Indianapolis, Indiana, United States. Indy Met currently enrolls students from grades nine through twelve. It was established on August 24, 2004, by Goodwill Education Initiatives.

== Demographics ==
Of Indy Met's 343 students (2007–08 school year), 66% are black, 28% are white, 1% are Hispanic, 1% are Native American, and 3% are multiracial. 52% of students qualify for free lunches and 10% qualify for reduced price lunches.

== See also ==
- List of schools in Indianapolis
- List of charter schools in Indiana
- List of high schools in Indiana
