= St. Richard's Episcopal School =

Coordinates: 39°48′56″N 86°09′21″W

- 33 E. 33rd St. Indianapolis, Indiana 46205; United States

Information
- Type: Private School
- Motto: Knowledge and Values for a Lifetime
- Established: 1960
- Headmaster: Leslie Hosey
- Grades: Pre-Kindergarten-8th Grade
- Colors: Green, White, and Red( )
- Athletics conference: Indianapolis Independent School League
- Mascot: Dragons
- Affiliation: Episcopal
- Website: strichardsschool.org

St. Richard's Episcopal School is a private, Episcopal day school located in Indianapolis, Indiana. It serves urban Indianapolis and the greater Indianapolis metropolitan area as a school for children from pre-kindergarten to eighth grade. It is the only Episcopal elementary day school in the state.

== History ==
St. Richard's School was founded in 1960 by the Rev. G. Ernest Lynch, rector of Trinity Episcopal Church. He envisioned a unique elementary school linked with the church that would stress academic excellence and traditional values, but also diversity of its student body. According to the school's website, "St. Richard’s School was the first private school in Indianapolis to open its doors to all races, creeds, and nationalities." The school's namesake comes from St. Richard of Wych, Bishop of Chichester from the 13th century. The official school song's lyrics come from St. Richard's famous prayer, "Day by Day". Its mission is "We foster knowledge and values for a lifetime through the implementation of our Five Pillars for Success: Faith, Classical Curriculum, Leadership, Civic Responsibility, and Global Readiness."

The school was modeled after a British day school and originally employed only European teachers. From the beginning, students were required to wear uniforms - plaid jumpers for girls and ties and trousers for boys. Both sexes wore green blazers emblazoned with the school's crest.

As of 2021, St. Richard's has a student body around 300 students. The schools is divided into three sections: early childhood, lower division, and middle division. St. Richard's continues to enroll students of diverse heritage and religion. Only 20% of students are Episcopalian and 27% are of racial or cultural minorities. Of all Indianapolis private schools, St. Richard's has arguably the best academic program in the city and is known for its avant-garde curriculum. Students take French from kindergarten until 5th grade. In 6th grade, students may decide to continue French or learn Spanish. Along with core subjects such as math, science, history and social studies, English, and foreign language, students also attend multiple art, music, and physical education classes a week. Grades 1 through 8 wear the traditional uniforms. In carrying out Rev. Lynch's wish for a school connected to the church, the lower school has a chapel service daily and the middle school once a week on Wednesdays.

St. Richard's mascot is the dragon. There are many sports with no-cut policies. There is usually an A-team of more experienced players and a B-team for developing players in grades 6–8. The school has sports teams for tennis, girls' volleyball, girls and boys basketball, track and field, and soccer in which the Dragons won the IISL from 2006 to 2009. The girls 5/6 basketball team also won their IISL Championship from 2023 to 2024. Intramural sports are offered for the lower school, including basketball and soccer.

In 2020, St. Richard's School celebrated its 60th anniversary, and the school leaders decided to change the name to St. Richard's Episcopal School.

School starts on every August 15. Before the first day of school there is an ice cream social. On September 15, there is "fête" at which students enjoy their Fridays after school. 5th graders go to France for a back-to-back program of 2 weeks at the end of the year. The French students also stay with American students for 2 weeks.

== See also ==
- List of schools in Indianapolis
