= Key Learning Community =

Key Learning Community High School

Location
- 777 South White River Parkway West Drive; Indianapolis, Marion County, Indiana 46226; United States
- Coordinates: 39.757247°N 86.175480°W

Information
- Type: Public high school
- School district: Indianapolis Public Schools
- Principal: Sheila Dollaske
- Faculty: 14
- Grades: 9-12
- Enrollment: 58 (2013-2014)
- Website: Official Website

Key Learning Community High School was a public high school located in Indianapolis, Indiana.

== Closure ==
In 2014, Indianapolis Public Schools (IPS) proposed a plan to shut down the high school.

By 2015, IPS voted 6–1 to move forward with the closure.

== See also ==
- List of schools in Indianapolis
- List of high schools in Indiana
