= Fall Creek Academy =

Location
- Indianapolis, Indiana; United States; 39.803743°N 86.161894°W

Information
- Type: Charter
- Principal: Hanno Becker K-8, Agnes Aleoba 9-12
- Faculty: 28 (approximate)
- Enrollment: 375-400 students(approximate)
- Website: http://fallcreekacademy.org

Fall Creek Academy was a free public charter school for grades 6–12 in Indianapolis, Indiana. It offered a "Middle College" program that allowed qualifying high school students to take college courses for college credit at no additional cost while still enrolled in high school.

The school closed at the end of the 2014 school year because its charter authorizer, Ball State University, declined to renew, citing the school's poor academic performance.

== See also ==
- List of schools in Indianapolis
- List of charter schools in Indiana
