= Circle City Prep =

Charter school in Indianapolis, Indiana, USA

Location
- 4002 N. Franklin Road; Indianapolis, Indiana 46226-5297; United States; 39.830004°N 86.028593°W

Information
- Type: Charter School, Coeducational
- Established: 2017
- Head of school: Megan Murphy
- Faculty: 63
- Grades: K–8
- Enrollment: 415 (August 2024)
- Campus: Urban
- Mascot: Panthers
- Website: Official Website

Circle City Prep (also known as Circle City Preparatory Charter School or CCP) is a co-educational public charter school located on the Far Eastside of Indianapolis, Indiana. The school opened in August 2017 with the founding Kindergarten and First Grade class, with 56 students each. It will grow by one grade level each year until it reaches full capacity in 2024, becoming an elementary and middle school. This enrollment strategy allows Circle City Prep to maintain a small school atmosphere, support by three academies, and provide supports for all learners.

== See also ==
- List of schools in Indianapolis
- List of charter schools in Indiana
