= Rabbi Naftali Riff Yeshiva =

Coordinates: 39.875047°N 86.175228°W

The Rabbi Naftali Riff Yeshiva was a private Jewish boarding school academy originally located in South Bend, Indiana, and later relocated to Indianapolis, Indiana. Founded in 1984 by Rabbi Yisrael Gettinger, it became Indiana's first rabbinical college in 1987. The yeshiva is no longer active in Indianapolis.

== See also ==
- List of schools in Indianapolis

== Outside reference websites ==
- https://web.archive.org/web/20120626224317/http://www.riffyeshiva.org/ Yeshiva website
- http://www.education.com/schoolfinder/us/indiana/indianapolis/the-rabbi-naftali-riff-yeshiva/ Education.com
- https://web.archive.org/web/20120702025729/https://www.education.com/schoolfinder/us/indiana/indianapolis/the-rabbi-naftali-riff-yeshiva/ (archived COPY of the) Education.com entry for this school
- https://www.privateschoolreview.com/the-rabbi-naftali-riff-yeshiva-profile another (more up-to-date ... as of 2020) entry for this school [from "privateschoolreview.com"]
- http://www.schooldigger.com/go/IN/schools/9999910905/school.aspx SchoolDigger.com
