= Herron High School =

Public (charter) secondary school in Indianapolis, Indiana, US

Location
- 110 East 16th Street; Indianapolis, Indiana; United States; 39.789126°N 86.155483°W

Information
- Type: Public (charter) secondary
- Established: 2003
- President: Janet McNeal
- Head of school: Anne Deckard
- Faculty: 92
- Grades: 9–12
- Enrollment: 998 (2023-24)
- Colors: black, white, red
- Mascot: Achaean
- Website: www.herronhighschool.org

Herron High School is a public charter school in Indianapolis, Indiana. It opened for the 2006–2007 school year. Herron is a college preparatory school, providing a classical-based education, and serves grades 9–12. It is located at 110 East 16th Street, just north of downtown Indianapolis in the building formerly occupied by Herron School of Art and Design of Indiana University – Purdue University Indianapolis, with which it is not affiliated.

Herron High School has five solids or core classes. Students are required to take all five solids throughout their entire time at Herron. The five solids are Math, English, Science, Social Studies and Latin. In addition, numerous other electives are offered, including music, Greek, French, Spanish, theatre, and various visual arts. Paintings by alumni and current students adorn the hallways.

== History ==
Herron High School opened in 2006. It was initially started in the basement of the nearby Harrison Center with only 98 freshmen. It moved to its current location, on 16th and Pennsylvania, in 2007. Herron has continued to grow and has now opened its second campus, Herron-Riverside High School.

== Awards and accolades ==
Herron consistently ranks in the top 1 percent of public high schools nationwide according to U.S. News & World Report, Newsweek, and The Washington Post. The U.S. News & World Report ranked Herron as the #1 high school in Indianapolis in 2020 and the #2 public high school in Indiana in 2018. In 2011, The Washington Post named it the #2 high school in Indiana, and in 2010, it placed #27 nationwide on Newsweek's "America's Best High Schools." Herron and its second location, Herron-Riverside, have performed especially well in terms of academic growth, with students showing 2.5-5 times more growth in a year than many peers nationwide. In 2019, Herron-Riverside students outperformed the national start of growth by 500%. Herron has consistently been awarded Four Star Award from the Indiana Department of Education, designated a Gold Medal School, and given an A score on the state accountability report card, making it the only Indianapolis high school to receive an A score between 2012 and 2018. It has also received the Institute of Quality Education's "Quality Matters" award and the NUVO Cultural Vision Award.

== See also ==
- List of schools in Indianapolis
- List of high schools in Indiana
- List of charter schools in Indiana
