= Anthony Boswell =

American football player (born 2006)

No. 52 – Houston Cougars
- Position: Center
- Class: Redshirt Sophomore

Personal information
- Born: May 21, 2006 (age 20)
- Listed height: 6 ft 2 in (1.88 m)
- Listed weight: 301 lb (137 kg)

Career information
- High school: Ben Davis (Indianapolis, Indiana)
- College: Purdue (2024); Toledo (2025); Houston (2026–present)

Awards and highlights
- First-team All-MAC (2025)
- Stats at ESPN

Anthony Labrone Boswell (born May 21, 2006) is an American college football center for the Houston Cougars. He previously played for the Purdue Boilermakers and Toledo Rockets.

== Early life ==
Boswell grew up in Indianapolis, Indiana. He attended Ben Davis High School in Indianapolis where he played football as an offensive lineman. Boswell served as a starting tackle in his last three years. He earned all-county and all-conference honors twice at Ben Davis while being part of a team that won the state title in his last year. However, he received no scholarship offers to play college football due to his size, being considered light for a lineman. Boswell weighed 245 pounds (111 kg) as a sophomore, 215 pounds (98 kg) in his junior year and 230 pounds (100 kg) in his senior year. After high school, he joined the Purdue Boilermakers as a walk-on after increasing his weight to 293 pounds (133 kg).

== College career ==
Boswell redshirted his true freshman season at Purdue in 2024. He transferred to the Toledo Rockets in 2025 and became the team's starting center after the original center was injured. Starting all 12 games, he allowed zero sacks and six pressures while being honored as a Freshman All-American and first-team All-Mid-American Conference (MAC). Pro Football Focus graded him one of the top 10 blockers at center in college football for the 2025 season. Boswell transferred to the Houston Cougars in 2026, earning mid-season All-American honors.
