= David R. Oliver Jr. =

Rear Admiral David R. Oliver Jr.
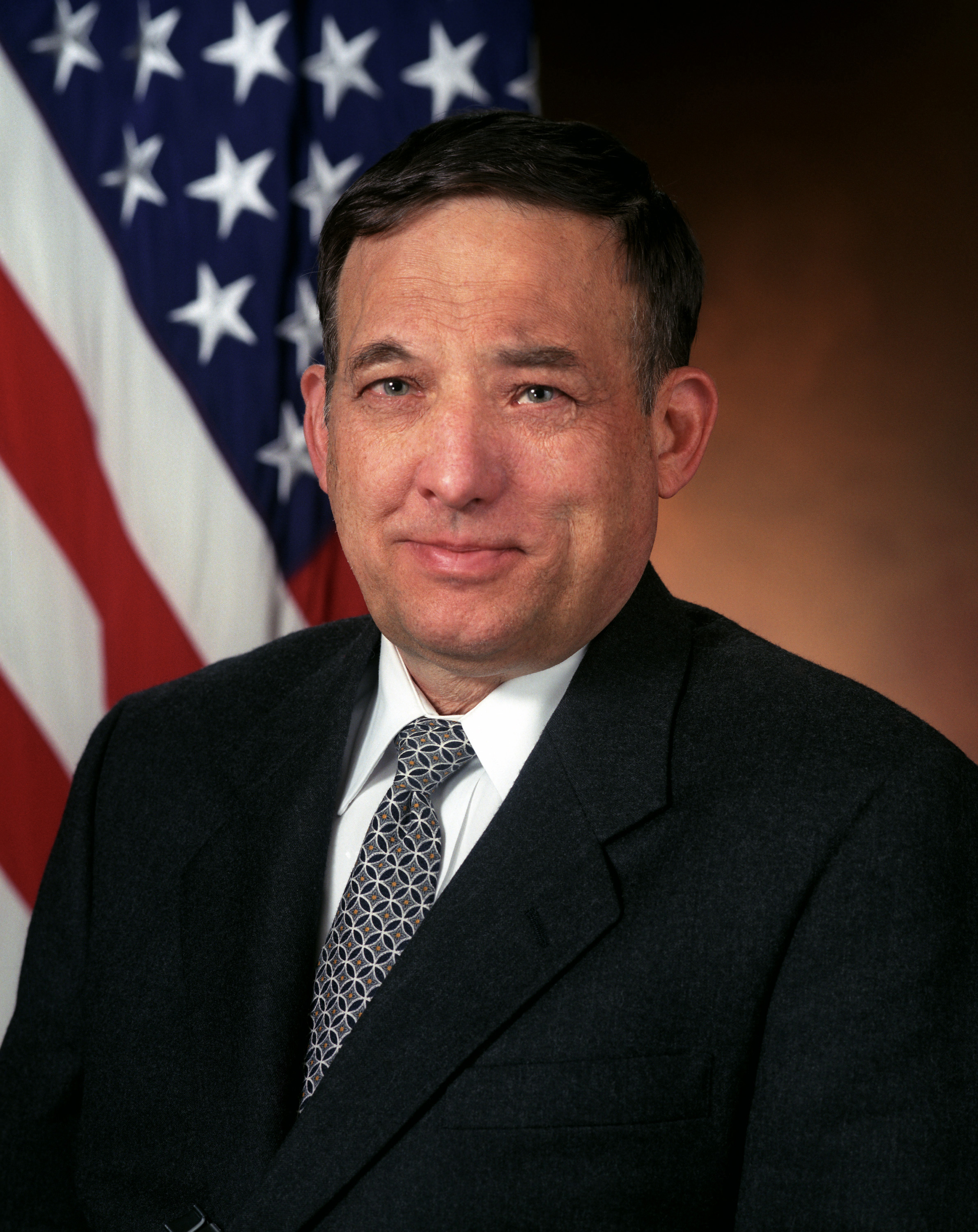
- Dave Oliver in 1998
- Born: September 17, 1941 (age 85)
- Military career
- Allegiance: United States
- Branch: Navy
- Service years: 1963–1995
- Rank: Rear Admiral
- Awards: Defense and Navy Distinguished Service Medals and six awards of the Legion of Merit
- Other work: Executive Vice President of the European Aeronautic Defense and Space Company for North America; Independent consultant; Director of the American Superconductor Corporation

Rear Admiral (Ret.) David Rogers "Dave" Oliver Jr. (born September 17, 1941) is the former executive vice president of the European Aeronautic Defence and Space Company (EADS) for North America. Currently he is an independent consultant. Since September 21, 2006, he has been the director of the American Superconductor Corporation.

== Education ==
Raised in Indianapolis, Indiana, Oliver graduated from Ben Davis High School in 1959 and the United States Naval Academy in 1963. He received a Master of Arts in Political Science and International Affairs (Middle East) from American University.

== Navy ==
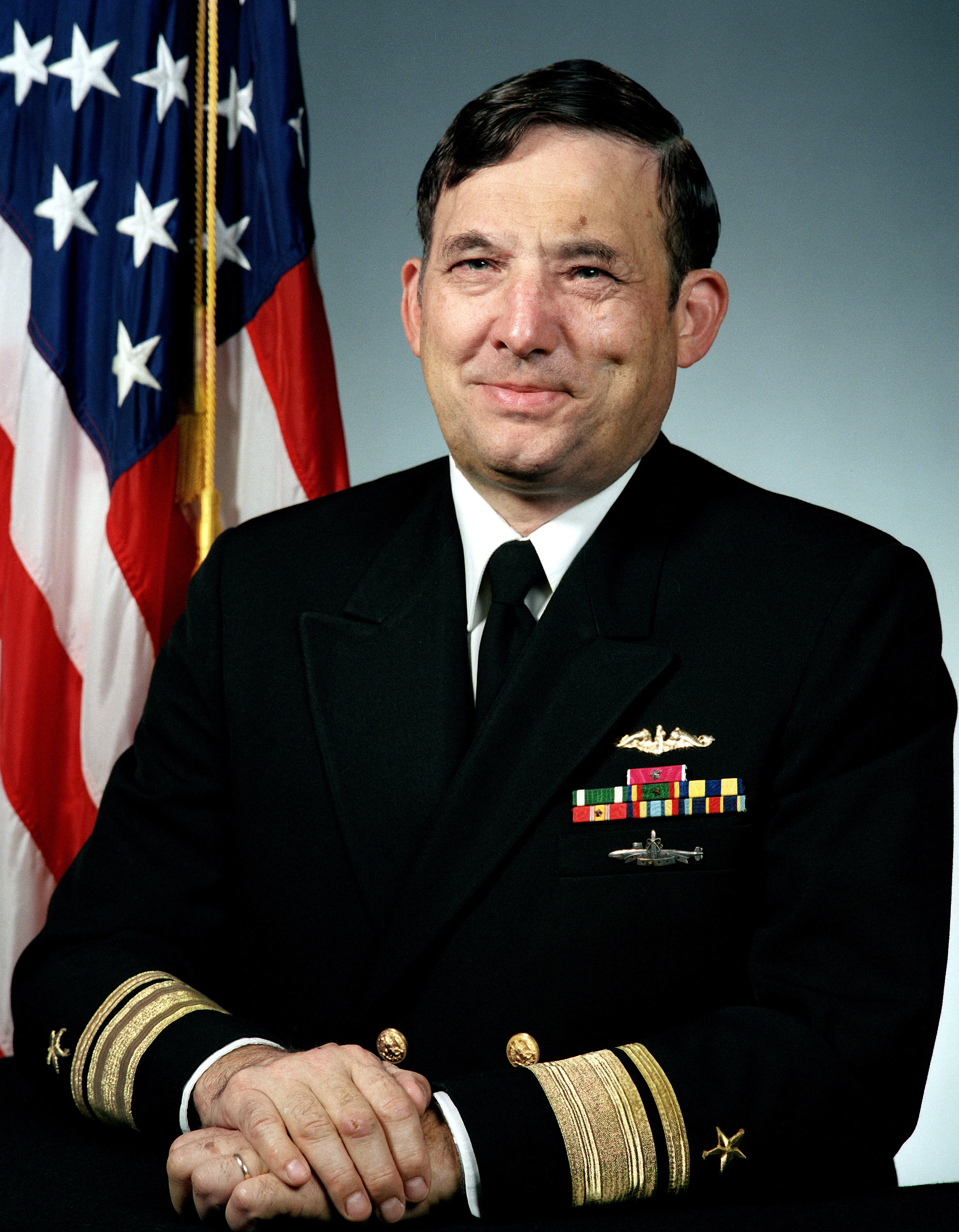
Rear Adm. Oliver in 1991

While in the Navy, Oliver commanded diesel and nuclear submarines, as well as two submarines groups in the Cold War, one in Japan and one in San Diego. His final appointment in the Navy was Principal Deputy to the Assistant Secretary of the Navy for Research, Development and Acquisition. His Military decorations include Defense and Navy Distinguished Service Medals and six awards of the Legion of Merit.

Oliver retired in 1995.

== Career ==
David R. Oliver Jr. held management positions at Westinghouse Electric and Northrop Grumman.

For both the Clinton and Bush administrations, Oliver served as the principal deputy under secretary of defense for acquisition, technology and logistics.

He was stationed in Baghdad, Iraq as director of management and budget for the Coalition Forces.

He also served as financial advisor to Coalition Provisional Authority director Paul Bremer in Iraq, saying of the $8.8 billion in cash that was lost by the Authority: "I have no idea. I can't tell you whether or not the money went to the right things or didn't - nor do I actually think it's important."

Between 2004 and 2008 Oliver was the chief executive officer of the Defense Division of EADS North America. During this time he ran the EADS portion of the capture effort for the Air Force Tanker Program.

From January 2008 through December 2011, Oliver held the title of executive vice president and chief operating officer of EADS. In this position, he oversaw marketing, business development activities, and managed the operational activities of the EADS North America holding company.

Oliver continued to grow with the European Aeronautic Defense and Space Company for the North American division. He also served as a strategic advisor, mergers and acquisitions, from January 2012 to July 2013.

Oliver is also a published author. He wrote an instruction primer for political appointees titled Making it in Washington. He also penned a management book, Lead On, and his wife's biography, Wide Blue Ribbon. His latest book is on leadership, featuring examples from the naval career of Hyman G. Rickover. It was published in November 2014 by the United States Naval Institute Press.

== Personal ==
In the 2024 United States presidential election, Oliver endorsed Kamala Harris. His younger brother Timothy is also a retired naval officer and former executive director of the Naval Submarine League.

== Awards ==
Oliver has received two awards for public service: the Bronze Palm to the Department of Defense Medal for Distinguished Public Service, and the Army and Navy Public Service Awards.

== Works ==
- Against the Tide: Rickover's Leadership Principles and the Rise of the Nuclear Navy. Annapolis, Maryland: Naval Institute Press, 2014.
- Lead On.
- Making It in Washington
- Wide Blue Ribbon.
