= Bill Warren (businessman) =

Bill Warren (December 7, 1941 – August 27, 2019) was a corporate human resource executive with Rockwell International and former President of Monster.com. He received the 1997 Employment Management Association's Pericles Pro Meritus Award for being the founder of online recruiting on the Internet.

Warren was the Executive Director of DirectEmployers Association, a non-profit consortium of 800 leading U.S. companies. DirectEmployers Association services include the JobCentral National Labor Exchange, an alliance with The National Association of State Workforce Agencies (NASWA).

He graduated from Ben Davis High School in 1960 and enlisted in the United States Army, where he served for 3 years until 1964. He then graduated from Indiana University.

He died on August 27, 2019

== Online recruiting history ==
In August 1992 Warren founded Online Career Center (OCC), the first employment site on the Internet. He remained president of OCC after it was sold to TMP Worldwide in December 1995. OCC was renamed Monster.com and he was named president in December 1998. Warren left Monster.com in 2000.
