= Fountain Square Academy =

Location
- 1615 S. Barth Ave. Indianapolis, Indiana 46203; United States; 39°44′45″N 86°08′27″W

Information
- Type: Charter
- Principal: Percy Clark
- Faculty: 20 (approximate)
- Grades: 6–12
- Website: fountainsquareacademy.org

Fountain Square Academy was a free public charter school for grades 6–12 in Indianapolis, Indiana. It offered a "Middle College" program that allowed qualifying high school students to take college courses for college credit at Ivy Tech Community College at no additional cost while still enrolled in high school.

The school was closed after the 2011–2012 school year when Greg Ballard, the mayor of Indianapolis, declined, in March 2011, to renew its charter due to lack of academic progress.

== See also ==
- List of schools in Indianapolis
- List of charter schools in Indiana
