= Indiana Japanese Language School =

Location
- 615 WEST 64th Street; Indianapolis, Indiana 46260; United States; 39°52′10.05″N 86°10′20.35″W

Information
- Type: Supplementary
- Established: 1981
- Principal: Katsuyoshi Mori

Indiana Japanese Language School (インディアナ日本語学校, Indiana Nihongo Gakkō) is a Japanese supplementary school in Indianapolis, Indiana. Classes are held at the Orchard School.

== History ==
It opened in 1981. Previously the International Center hosted classes. By 1986 the Orchard School hosted the Japanese school's classes. The school had around 40 students, with some having parents working at some twenty companies which were branches of Japanese firms, including subsidiaries of Enkei, Sanyo, Sony, and Uniden. Some students had parents were academics at area universities, including Indiana University and Purdue University. By then the Indiana Japanese School served around two to three students who were living in Columbus, all of them children of Enkei employees.

By 1997 it had 308 students, including Columbus and West Lafayette students, with most of them being children of company employees. That year the school, which served K-12, was the largest of the Indiana hoshuko.

== Curriculum ==
As of 1986, mathematics, science, and the Japanese language are the main courses taken. By 1997 the course offerings also included social studies, and each day had five hours of instruction.

== See also ==
- List of schools in Indianapolis
- Japanese language education in the United States
