= The Clowes Fund =

Family foundation based in Indiana

- Named after: The Clowes family
- Formation: 1952
- Founder: George Henry Alexander Clowes
- Headquarters: Indianapolis, Indiana, US
- Region served: Midwest, New England
- President: Jonathan Clowes
- Vice President: Edith Bowles
- Secretary: Samuel Huneke
- Treasurer: Veronica Serrato
- Board of directors: Ben Blanton, Aidan Clowes, Alexander Clowes, Daniel Clowes, Sarah Clowes, Una Osili
- Revenue: $4.6 million USD (2024)
- Disbursements: $3.1 million USD
- Expenses: $4.1 million USD (2024)
- Website: clowesfund.org

The Clowes Fund is a charity organization currently funded by the Clowes family estate. It was legally established by George Henry Alexander Clowes Sr. in Indianapolis in 1952. The Fund is mainly controlled by Clowes family attorneys and representatives, as well as current Clowes family members.

== Charity ==
The Fund provides "introductory grants" towards things such as immigrant services, workforce development, arts education and K–12 education. It is funded by the Clowes' family estate. It has grant cycles and provides monetary assistance to many organizations. The grant cycles are yearly, and grants can provide up to $2.5 million throughout Indianapolis, New England, and Seattle.

The family's funding has resulted in memorial and namesake buildings and halls, such as the Clowes Memorial Hall at Butler University and the Clowes Collection/Pavilion in Newfields/The Indianapolis Museum of Art (IMA). Current president, Jonathan Clowes, is one of three sons of George H.A. Clowes Jr. and Vice President Edith Bowles is one of two daughters. The other Clowes children and spouses are on the board of directors, all from George H. A. Clowes, as Allen W. Clowes never had children.

== History ==
George H. A. Clowes Sr. and his wife moved to Indianapolis in 1919 so that he could join Eli Lilly and Co. While in Indy, they engaged in the arts and financially supported companies and organizations that were geared towards arts and humanities. In 1933, Clowes served as a chairperson for the Indianapolis Symphony Orchestra and, beginning in 1941, became board chair. Edith Whitehill Hinkel Clowes, Clowes Sr.'s wife, was one of nine women who established the Orchard School in 1922, based on the "Organic School Model". The school was for children up to the first grade, and focused on individual creativity and personalized educational goals. Her son, Allen Whitehill Clowes, was in the first graduating class.

The Clowes family was composed of the parents and two sons, along with a third son who died in childhood. The sons, George Henry Alexander Clowes Jr. and Allen W. Clowes followed in their parents footsteps. George H. A. Clowes Jr. became a surgeon, while Allen W. Clowes later became president and treasurer of the Clowes Fund when his father and mother died.
