= Christel House Indianapolis =

Coordinates: 39.7279361°N 86.148716°W

- Indianapolis, Indiana; United States

Information
- Type: Public charter school
- Established: 2002
- Website: chindy.org

Christel House Indianapolis is a network of learning centers supported by Christel House International (CHI). The centers, authorized by the Mayor of Indianapolis, operate as public charter schools on multiple campus locations.

- Christel House Academy South opened in 2002 on the Southside of Indianapolis and serves more than 500 low-income students in grades K–8.
- Christel House Watanable High School opened in 2011 with a ninth grade class and now serves over 400 students in grades 9–12.
- Christel House DORS South, an adult dropout recovery high school, opens on the Christel House South campus in 2012.
- Christel House Academy West opened in 2014 and serves nearly 500 students in grades K–8.
- Christel House DORS West, the academy's second adult high school, opened on the Christel House West campus in 2015.
- Christel House DORS Northwest, the third adult high school, opened in 2023.

In December 2013 Christel House Academy received an F-rating in Indiana state school accountability rankings.

In subsequent years, Christel House Academy South earned a B.

== See also ==
- List of schools in Indianapolis
- List of charter schools in Indiana
