= Crawford County Community Schools =

School district in Indiana

Address
- 5805 E Administration Rd Marengo, Crawford, Indiana, 47140; United States
- Coordinates: 38.322594°N 86.344892°W

District information
- Type: Public
- Grades: Pre-K through 12
- Superintendent: Brandon Johnson
- Schools: 3 Elementary, 1 Middle, 1 High
- Budget: $19.97 million (2021)
- NCES District ID: 1802440

Students and staff
- Students: ~1,340
- Teachers: 93
- Staff: 86
- Student–teacher ratio: 14.45
- District mascot: Wolfpack

Other information
- Website: www.cccs.k12.in.us

Crawford County Community School Corporation is a school district headquartered in Marengo, Indiana.

== Schools ==
- Crawford County High School
- Crawford County Middle School
- East Crawford Elementary School
- South Crawford Elementary School
- West Crawford Elementary School
