= Decatur Central High School =

Public high school in Indianapolis, Indiana, US

Location
- 5251 Kentucky Avenue; Indianapolis, Indiana 46221; United States; 39°41′16″N 86°16′30″W

Information
- Type: Public high school
- Motto: "Inspiring all to achieve their highest potential."
- School district: Metropolitan School District of Decatur Township
- NCES School ID: 180264000312
- Principal: Tom Wachnicki
- Teaching staff: 128.00 (on an FTE basis)
- Grades: 9–12
- Enrollment: 2,061 (2023–2024)
- Student to teacher ratio: 16.10
- Colors: Navy and gold
- Athletics conference: Mid-State
- Mascot: Hawk
- Nickname: Hawks
- Website: www.decaturproud.org/central-high

Decatur Central High School (DCHS) is a public high school in Indianapolis, Indiana, United States.

== About ==
Decatur Central High School is part of the Metropolitan School District of Decatur Township. The school currently enrolls students from grades nine through twelve.

== Small learning communities ==
Decatur Central has "small learning communities" with different learning styles. Students decide which SLC they would like to be entered in with a form explaining all the SLCs. This form is composed of a selection graph explaining the SLC they would like to be in, and a short essay area. In total there are five SLCs: Choice, Edge, Innovation, New Tech, and Q&I.

== Demographics ==
Of Decatur Central's 1,632 students (in the 2007–08 school year), 83% were White, 10% were African American, 4% were Hispanic, 1% were Asian, and 2% were multiracial. 43% of students qualified for free lunches and 0% qualified for reduced price lunches.

== Athletics ==
The mascot of Decatur Central is the Hawk; the school colors are Navy Blue and Varsity Gold.

== Notable alumni ==
- Amy Cozad, Olympic diver in the 2016 Rio Olympics
- Aaron Gibson - former NFL offensive tackle for the Chicago Bears, Dallas Cowboys and Detroit Lions
- Richard M. Givan - former Chief Justice Indiana Supreme Court
- Tommy Stevens - drafted by the New Orleans Saints in the seventh round with the 240th overall pick in the 2020 NFL draft.
- Javon Tracy - college football wide receiver for the Minnesota Golden Gophers
- Tyrone Tracy Jr. - drafted by the New York Giants in the fifth round with the 166th overall pick in the 2024 NFL draft.

== See also ==
- List of schools in Indianapolis
- List of high schools in Indiana
