= WKLU =

K-LOVE radio station in Brownsburg, Indiana, US

Coordinates: 39.787°N 86.299°W

Brownsburg, Indiana; United States
- Broadcast area: Indianapolis metropolitan area
- Frequency: 101.9 MHz
- Branding: K-LOVE

Programming
- Format: Contemporary Christian
- Affiliations: K-LOVE

Ownership
- Owner: Educational Media Foundation

History
- First air date: 1992
- Former call signs: WQFE (1992–2009)
- Call sign meaning: WKLUve (K-Love is the current branding)

Technical information
- Licensing authority: FCC
- Facility ID: 54289
- Class: A
- ERP: 4,000 watts
- HAAT: 110 meters (360 ft)

Links
- Public license information: Public file; LMS
- Webcast: Listen Live!
- Website: klove.com

WKLU (101.9 FM) is a radio station licensed to Brownsburg, Indiana, and serving the Indianapolis metropolitan area. The station is owned by the Educational Media Foundation and carries its K-LOVE network, playing Contemporary Christian music.

While the K-LOVE format is national, the station broadcasts public affairs programming for Brownsburg and Hendricks County on select Sunday nights. In addition, the WKLU studios are used for the K-LOVE morning show which is heard nationwide.

== History ==
In 1992, the station signed on the air as WQFE. It used a 300-foot tower, located in Hendricks County. The station played easy listening music.

In September 1994, WQFE changed to an oldies format that was not successful.

In 1999, Bruce "The Radio Pirate" Quinn took over his family owned station. The call letters were changed to WKLU and branded as "The New Kool 101.9". The format evolved to a loose variant of classic rock specializing in titles that most Indianapolis radio stations didn't play, including songs from jam bands.

In 2006 the Quinns sold the station to Miami radio entrepreneur Russ Oasis, who moved the tower to its current location and reformatted the station to a more commercially viable Oldies format. At midnight on December 4, 2007, WKLU began playing the hits of the 1960s and 1970s as "The New Oldies 101.9".

On July 15, 2009, WKLU was sold by Russ Oasis to the Educational Media Foundation. The station switched to the K-LOVE network of Contemporary Christian music on September 15, 2009, at 6 p.m. Before the switch, a goodbye show was held by the staff and DJs of Oldies 101.9. The last song on Oldies was "Thank You for Being a Friend" by Andrew Gold.
