= List of charter schools in Indiana =

The following is a list of charter schools in Indiana (including networks of such schools) grouped by county.

== Statewide ==
- Indiana Connections Academy
- Indiana Connections Career Academy
- Insight School of Indiana
- Options Charter School
- Paramount Online Academy
- Phalen Virtual Academy

== Allen County ==
- Smith Academy for Excellence
- Timothy L. Johnson Leadership Academy

== Clark County ==
- Rock Creek Community Academy

== Delaware County ==
- Inspire Academy

== Floyd County ==
- Community Montessori School

== Hamilton County ==
- Options Charter School (Carmel, Noblesville)

== Hancock County ==
- Geist Montessori School

== Jefferson County ==
- Canaan Community Academy

== Lake County ==
- 21st Century Charter School of Gary
- Aspire Charter Academy
- Charter School of the Dunes
- East Chicago Lighthouse Charter School
- East Chicago Urban Enterprise Academy
- Gary Lighthouse Charter School
- Gary Middle College (East, West)
- Hammond Academy of Science and Technology
- Higher Institute of Arts and Technology
- Steel City Academy
- Thea Bowman Leadership Academy

== Laporte County ==
- Renaissance Academy

== Madison County ==
- Anderson Preparatory Academy

== Marion County ==
- ACE Preparatory Academy
- Allegiant Preparatory Academy
- Andrew J. Brown Academy
- Avondale Meadows Academy
- Believe Circle City Academy
- Charles A. Tindley Accelerated School
- Christel House Academy (DORS, South, West)
- Circle City Prep
- Damar Charter Academy
- Dynamic Minds Academy
- Emma Donnan School (Adelante)
- Enlace Academy
- GEO Next Generation Academy
- George & Veronica Phalen Leadership Academy
- Global Prep Academy
- Herron High School
- HIM by HER Collegiate School for the Arts
- Hoosier Academy
- Hope Academy
- Ignite Achievement Academy
- Indiana Math & Science Academy (North, West)
- Indianapolis Metropolitan High School
- Invent Learning Hub
- Irvington Community School
- Kindezi Academy
- KIPP Indy (Legacy, Middle, Unite)
- Matchbook Learning
- Paramount (Cottage Home, Englewood)
- Paramount School of Excellence Brookside
- PATH School 67
- Phalen (93, 103, Leadership Academy)
- Purdue Polytechnic High School (North, Englewood)
- Riverside High School
- Rooted School
- Southeast Neighborhood School of Excellence (SENSE)
- Tindley Academy (Genesis, Summit)
- UrbanACT Academy
- Vanguard Collegiate School
- Victory College Prep
- Vision Academy

== Monroe County ==
- The Project School
- Seven Oaks Classical School

== Pike County ==
- Otwell Miller Academy

== Porter County ==
- Discovery Charter School
- Neighbors' New Vistas High School

== Rush County ==
- Mays Community Academy

== St. Joseph County ==
- Career Academy Middle School
- Career Academy High School
- Paramount School of Excellence South Bend
- Purdue Polytechnic High School
- Success Academy
- Success Academy Boys & Girls Club
- The Portage School of Leaders

== Sullivan County ==
- Rural Community Academy

== Tippecanoe County ==
- Paramount School of Excellence Lafayette

== Vanderburgh County ==
- Joshua Academy
- Signature School
