= The Chef's Academy =

For-profit college in Indianapolis, Indiana, US

- Type: Privately held, for-profit
- Established: 2006
- Students: 425
- Location: Indianapolis, Indiana, United States
- Campus: Multiple: Indiana and North Carolina
- Website: harrison.edu www.thechefsacademy.com

The Chef's Academy is the culinary division of Harrison College based in Indianapolis, Indiana. Harrison College, formerly known as Indiana Business College, is a for-profit career college based in Indianapolis, Indiana, with locations across Indiana, online and in Ohio. The college was founded as Marion Business College in 1902 in Marion, Indiana.

== Mission ==
The Chef's Academy is a division of Harrison College, with an Indianapolis, Indiana-based campus as well as a regional campus in Raleigh, North Carolina. Both offer bachelor and associate degree programs in culinary and hospitality fields.

== Statistics ==
- Year Established: 2006
- Locations: Indianapolis, Indiana and Raleigh, North Carolina
- Academic Degrees: Bachelor, Associate
- Programs and Courses: 3 - Culinary Arts associate degree, Pastry Arts associate degree, and Hospitality Restaurant Management bachelor's degree
- Class Schedules: Day, evening and weekend
- Enrollment: Approximately 425
- Graduates: More than 200
- Graduate Employment Rates: Nearly 92% of graduates obtain employment within a year of completing their The Chef's Academy/Harrison education.

== Accreditation and regulation ==
=== Accreditation ===
Accrediting Council for Independent Colleges and Schools (ACICS)

Harrison College/The Chef's Academy is accredited by the Accrediting Council for Independent Colleges and Schools to award Certificates, Diplomas and Associate of Applied Science and Bachelor of Science Degrees. The Accrediting Council for Independent Colleges and Schools is listed as a nationally recognized accrediting agency by the United States Department of Education. Its accreditation of degree-granting institutions is also recognized by the Council for Higher Education Accreditation.

American Culinary Federation (ACF)

The Chef's Academy is endorsed and accredited by the American Culinary Federation (ACF).

=== Regulation ===
Harrison College is also regulated by The Indiana Commission on Proprietary Education.
