= Pikes Peak Prep =

Location
- Colorado Springs, Colorado; United States
- Coordinates: 38°49′38″N 104°48′55″W

Information
- Type: Charter
- Closed: 2018
- CEEB code: 060512
- Principal: Janet Nace
- Faculty: 23 (approximate)
- Website: pikespeakprep.org

Pikes Peak Prep was a free, public K–12 charter school located in downtown Colorado Springs, Colorado. United States.

Pikes Peak Prep is ranked a Performance level school based on the Colorado Department of Education evaluation in 2016. 100% of seniors in 2016 graduated from Pikes Peak Prep, and over 90% of students enroll in college.

In 2011, Pikes Peak Prep received the Governor's Distinguished Improvement Award.

The school offered a Middle College Program, allowing students to earn college credits. High School students were able to concurrently enroll in college classes at Pikes Peak Community College, and receive both college credit and high school credit. Pikes Peak Prep paid for student's college tuition, provided transportation, and books.

This school changed locations after management of the school was changed in an agreement with Colorado Charter School Institute.
