= New Beginnings High School =

Coordinates: 39°47′30.5″N 86°09′28″W

- Indianapolis, Indiana; United States

Information
- Type: Public secondary alternative school

New Beginnings High School was a public secondary alternative school in Indianapolis, Indiana, United States which educated students in grades 9–12. Students who attend New Beginnings are identified as "high risk", usually having been expelled or otherwise removed for disciplinary reasons from traditional Indianapolis Public Schools.

== See also ==
- List of schools in Indianapolis
