= Harrison College (Indiana) =

Private, for-profit American college (1902–2018)

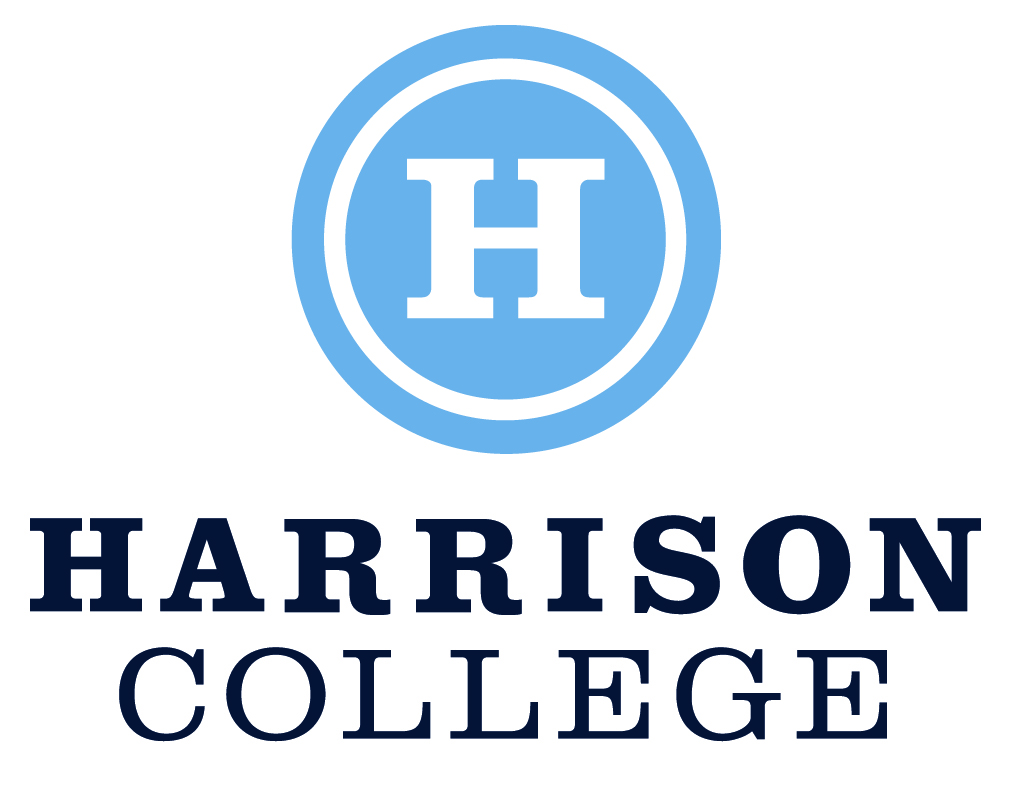
- Motto: Experience the Harrison Difference
- Type: For-profit
- Active: 1902–2018
- President: Craig F. Pfannenstiehl
- Students: 3,000 +
- Location: Multiple locations, Indiana, Ohio, North Carolina, United States
- Campus: 11 campus locations
- Website: harrison.edu

Harrison College was a private, for-profit college based in Indianapolis, Indiana, United States, with 11 campuses in Indiana, Ohio, and North Carolina. The college was founded as Indiana Business College in 1902 in Marion, Indiana. Harrison graduated more than 80,000 students, with associate degrees, bachelor's degrees and certificates in more than 30 programs across six schools of study: business, nursing, health sciences, information technology, veterinary technology and culinary arts at The Chef's Academy at Harrison College. Harrison was accredited by the Accrediting Bureau of Health Education Schools (ABHES) and its baccalaureate nursing degree programs were accredited by the Commission on Collegiate Nursing Education. On September 14, 2018, an open letter was published on Harrison College's website explaining that all campuses would close permanently on September 16, 2018, except for The Chef's Academy, which would stay open until the term ended on October 14, 2018.
