= School Town of Speedway =

School district in Speedway, Indiana, US

Coordinates: 39°48′02.8″N 86°15′10.6″W

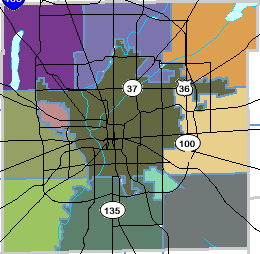
- Map of school districts in Marion County. School Town of Speedway is shaded in magenta.

Location
- Speedway, Indiana, USA

District information
- Type: Public
- Enrollment: 1,654

Other information
- Superintendent: Kyle Trebley
- Website: https://www.speedwayschools.org/

The School Town of Speedway is a public school district based in Speedway, Indiana (USA). The district has six campuses and an enrollment of approximately 1,650 students.

== Schools ==
=== High school ===
- Grades 9-12
  - Speedway Senior High School

=== Junior high school ===
- Grades 7-8
  - Speedway Junior High School

=== Elementary schools ===
- Grades K-6
  - James A. Allison Elementary School
  - Carl G. Fisher Elementary School
  - Arthur C. Newby Elementary School
  - Frank H. Wheeler Elementary School

== Enrollment ==
- 2007-08 School Year: 1,654 students (preliminary)
- 2006-07 School Year: 1,627 students
- 2005-06 School Year: 1,696 students
- 2004-05 School Year: 1,654 students
- 2003-04 School Year: 1,662 students

== Demographics ==
There were a total of 1,627 students enrolled in the School Town of Speedway during the 2006–2007 school year. The gender makeup of the district was 48.06% female and 51.94% male. The racial makeup of the district was 65.03% White, 19.18% African American, 9.71% Hispanic, 4.36% Multiracial, 1.48% Asian, and 0.25% Native American. 40.01% of the district's students receive free or reduced lunch.

== See also ==
- List of school districts in Indiana
