= Beech Grove City Schools =

School district in Beech Grove, Indiana, US

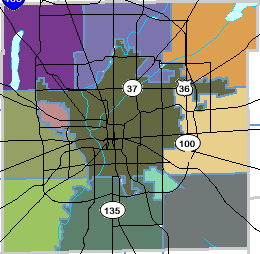
- Map of school districts in Marion County. Beech Grove City Schools is shaded in mint green.

Location
- Beech Grove, Indiana; United States

District information
- Type: Public
- Superintendent: Dr. Laura Hammack
- Enrollment: 2,293

Other information
- Website: https://bgcs.k12.in.us/

Beech Grove City Schools is the public school district serving the city of Beech Grove, Indiana. The district has five schools, with a total of 2,293 students. The district superintendent is Dr. Laura Hammack.

== Schools ==
- Hornet Park Elementary
- Central Elementary
- South Grove Intermediate
- Beech Grove Middle School
- Beech Grove High School

== See also ==
- List of school districts in Indiana
