= Metropolitan School District of Lawrence Township =

School district in Marion County, Indiana, US

Coordinates: 39°53′N 86°0′W

Metropolitan School of Lawrence Township (MSD LT)

Location
- 6501 Sunnyside Rd. Indianapolis, Indiana Lawrence Township; Marion County, Indiana United States

District information
- Grades: K-12
- Established: 1959
- Superintendent: Dr. Shawn A. Smith

Students and staff
- Students: 16,165
- Teachers: 932
- Athletic conference: Metropolitan; Conference Indiana
- District mascot: Lawrence Central Bears; Lawrence North Wildcats

Other information
- 2009 Graduation Rate: 85.0%
- Schedule: multiple schedules in use
- Website: Official website

The Metropolitan School District of Lawrence Township is a school district in Lawrence Township in northeast Marion County, Indianapolis, Indiana. It covers an area of 48 square miles (120 km^{2}) and in 2025 had a student enrollment of around 16,700.

It includes two high schools, two middle schools, eleven elementary schools, four kindergarten centers, and one alternative school for at-risk students of middle-school and high-school age. It also operates a Diploma Recovery Program for adults (over 18) and a Community Education Program.

The district includes eight National Blue Ribbon Schools, which have achieved a 97% graduation rate and over 75% progression to post-secondary education.

== High schools ==
- Lawrence North High School
- Lawrence Central High School
- McKenzie Center for Innovation & Technology

== Middle schools ==
- Belzer Middle School
- Fall Creek Valley Middle School

== Elementary schools ==
- Amy Beverland Elementary School
- Brook Park Elementary School
- Crestview Elementary School
- Forest Glen Elementary School
- Harrison Hill Elementary School
- Indian Creek Elementary School
- Mary Castle Elementary School
- Oaklandon Elementary School
- Skiles Test Elementary School
- Sunnyside Elementary School
- Winding Ridge Elementary School

== Early Learning Centers (Kindergarten) ==
- Amy Beverland Early Learning Center
- Brook Park Early Learning Center
- Mary Castle Early Learning Center
- Winding Ridge Early Learning Center

== See also ==
- List of school districts in Indiana
