= Metropolitan School District of Wayne Township =

School district in Marion County, Indiana, US

The Metropolitan School District of Wayne Township is a school district located in Indianapolis, Indiana, United States, serving Wayne Township in western Marion County. It is known for its high school, Ben Davis, which was founded in 1892. The district also operates 2 seventh and eighth grade centers, one ninth grade center, and 11 elementary schools. Recently, a ninth-grade center was built alongside Ben Davis to address the specific needs of ninth grade students. Currently, the former Fulton Junior High has been renovated and reconstructed and reopened in 2007 as Chapel Hill Seventh and Eighth Grade Center. The district received a new superintendent, Dr. Jeff Butts, in 2011.

In addition to the many courses available at Ben Davis, there is the Area 31 Career Center that focuses on upper-class students (juniors and seniors). The courses available at the center include everything from computer programming to cosmetics, and help get a jump-start into entering a college course. Students from 11 high schools in Marion, Hendricks, and Morgan Counties can come to the Career Center at Ben Davis and take courses during the regular school day. The district also has an extensive adult-education program and has opened Ben Davis University High School, a partnership with Vincennes University.

The school system owns radio station WBDG which is a 400-Watt FM radio station based at Ben Davis High School and operated by the students of BDHS and the Area 31 Career Center.

== Schools ==
=== Elementary schools ===
- Bridgeport Elementary School
- Chapel Glen Elementary School
- Chapelwood Elementary School
- Garden City Elementary School
- Maplewood Elementary School
- McClelland Elementary School
- North Wayne Elementary School
- Rhoades Elementary School
- Robey Elementary School
- Stout Field Elementary School
- Westlake Elementary School

=== Middle schools ===
- Chapel Hill Seventh and Eighth Grade Center
- Lynhurst Seventh and Eighth Grade Center

=== High schools ===
- Ben Davis Ninth Grade Center
- Ben Davis High School
- Ben Davis University High School (opened fall 2007)
- Area 31 Career Center
- Achieve Virtual Education Academy

=== Other schools ===
- Sanders School
- Wayne Preparatory Academy formerly Wayne Enrichment Center
- Wayne Township Preschool
- West Central Joint Services

== See also ==
- List of school districts in Indiana
