= The Orchard School (Indianapolis) =

Location
- 615 West 64th Street; Indianapolis, Marion County, Indiana 46260; United States; 39.870126°N 86.172175°W

Information
- Type: Independent School
- Established: 1922
- Head of school: Dr. Sherri Helvie
- Grades: Pre-Kindergarten-Grade 8
- Enrollment: 550 Total (2019-2020)
- Color
- Team name: Owls
- Website: Official Website

The Orchard School is a co-educational, independent school in Indianapolis, Indiana. It was founded in 1922 and utilizes a progressive method of educating pre-kindergarten to eighth grade students.

The school, also known as Orchard Country Day School for several decades, is located on a 50-acre campus near the Meridian Hills neighborhood on the North Side of Indianapolis. Enrollment for 2015-2016 was 604 students.

== History ==
A wing of the school building opened in September 1969.

By 1986, the school began hosting the Indiana Japanese Language School.

== Heads of School ==
- Hillis L. Howie
- Gordon Thompson
- Daniel Vorenberg
- Charles Clark
- Joseph P. Marshall
- Thomas Rosenbluth
- Sherri Helvie

== See also ==
- List of schools in Indianapolis
