= Metropolitan School District of Decatur Township =

School district in Marion County, Indiana, US

The Metropolitan School District of Decatur Township is a public school district located in Decatur Township, Indianapolis, Indiana. It has an enrollment of 6,131 students in grades K-12 (one PreK early childhood center, six K-6 elementary schools, one 7-8 middle school, and one 9-12 high school). There is also an alternative school run by the district. The district superintendent is Dr. Stephanie Hofer.

== Schools ==
=== High Schools (9-12) ===
- Decatur Central High School

=== Middle Schools (7-8) ===
- Decatur Middle School

=== Elementary (K - 6th) ===
- Stephen Decatur Elementary School
- Valley Mills Elementary School
- West Newton Elementary School
- Blue Academy
- Gold Academy
- Lynwood Elementary

=== Preschool (Pre-K Only) ===
- Liberty Pre-K

=== Alternative ===
- Decatur Township School of Excellence

== See also ==
- List of school districts in Indiana
