= Metropolitan School District of Pike Township =

School district in Marion County, Indiana, US

Coordinates: 39°53′N 86°17′W

The Metropolitan School District of Pike Township is a school district in the northwestern portion of Marion County, Indianapolis, Indiana, United States. Founded in 1937 for grades K-12, the district is relatively diverse, with a 91.1% nonwhite student population, with over 850 international students who represent 85 different countries and speak 65 languages.

The district has nine elementary schools, three middle schools, one high school, and one alternative learning school. The average student/teacher ratio is 17 to 1 in academic classrooms. It maintains a 94% graduation rate at the high school level, with nearly 64% proceeding to post-secondary education. Four of its schools—Fishback, New Augusta South, New Augusta North, and Eagle Creek—are year-round schools. The high school, Pike High School, is an International Baccalaureate school as of 2004, and boasts a Freshman Center, opening the same year.

== High schools ==
- Pike High School

== Middle schools ==
- Guion Creek Middle School
- Lincoln Middle School
- New Augusta Public Academy North

== Elementary schools ==
- Central Elementary School
- College Park Elementary School
- Deer Run Elementary School
- Eagle Creek Elementary School
- Eastbrook Elementary School
- Fishback Creek Public Academy
- Guion Creek Elementary School
- New Augusta Public Academy South
- Snacks Crossing Elementary School

== Other schools ==
- Cooperative Achievement Program

== See also ==
- List of school districts in Indiana
