= Muzzleloader =

Class of gun which is loaded from the muzzle

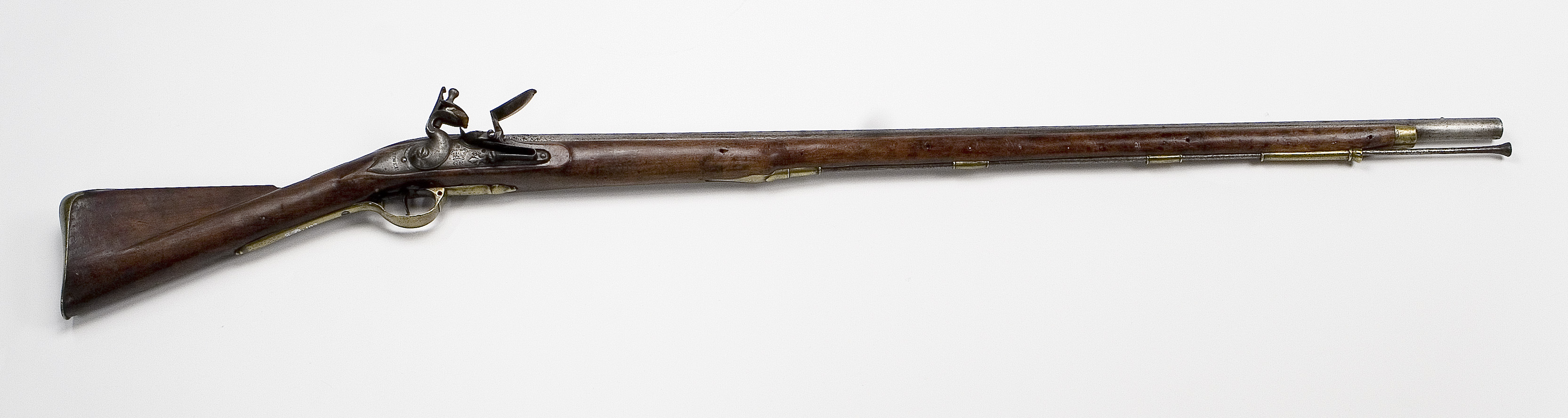
A "Brown Bess" muzzle-loading musket, used by the British Army from 1722 to 1838

A muzzleloader is any firearm in which the user loads the projectile and the propellant charge into the muzzle end of the gun (i.e., from the forward, open end of the gun's barrel). This is distinct from the modern designs of breech-loading firearms, in which user loads the ammunition into the breech end of the barrel. The term "muzzleloader" applies to both rifled and smoothbore type muzzleloaders, and may also refer to the marksman who specializes in the shooting of such firearms. The firing methods, paraphernalia and mechanism further divide both categories as do caliber (from cannons to small-caliber palm guns).

Modern muzzleloading firearms range from reproductions of sidelock, flintlock and percussion long guns, to in-line rifles that use modern inventions such as a closed breech, sealed primer and fast rifling to allow for considerable accuracy at long ranges.

Modern mortars use a shell with the propelling charge and primer attached at the base. Unlike older muzzleloading mortars, which were loaded the same way as muzzleloading cannon, the modern mortar is fired by dropping the shell down the barrel where a pin fires the primer, igniting the main propelling charge. Both the modern mortar and the older mortar were used for high angle fire. However, the fact that the mortar is not loaded in separate steps may make its definition as a muzzleloader a matter of opinion.

Muzzleloading can apply to anything from cannons to pistols but in modern parlance the term most commonly applies to black powder small arms. It usually, but not always, involves the use of a loose propellant (i.e., gunpowder) and projectile, as well as a separate method of ignition or priming.

== Loading ==
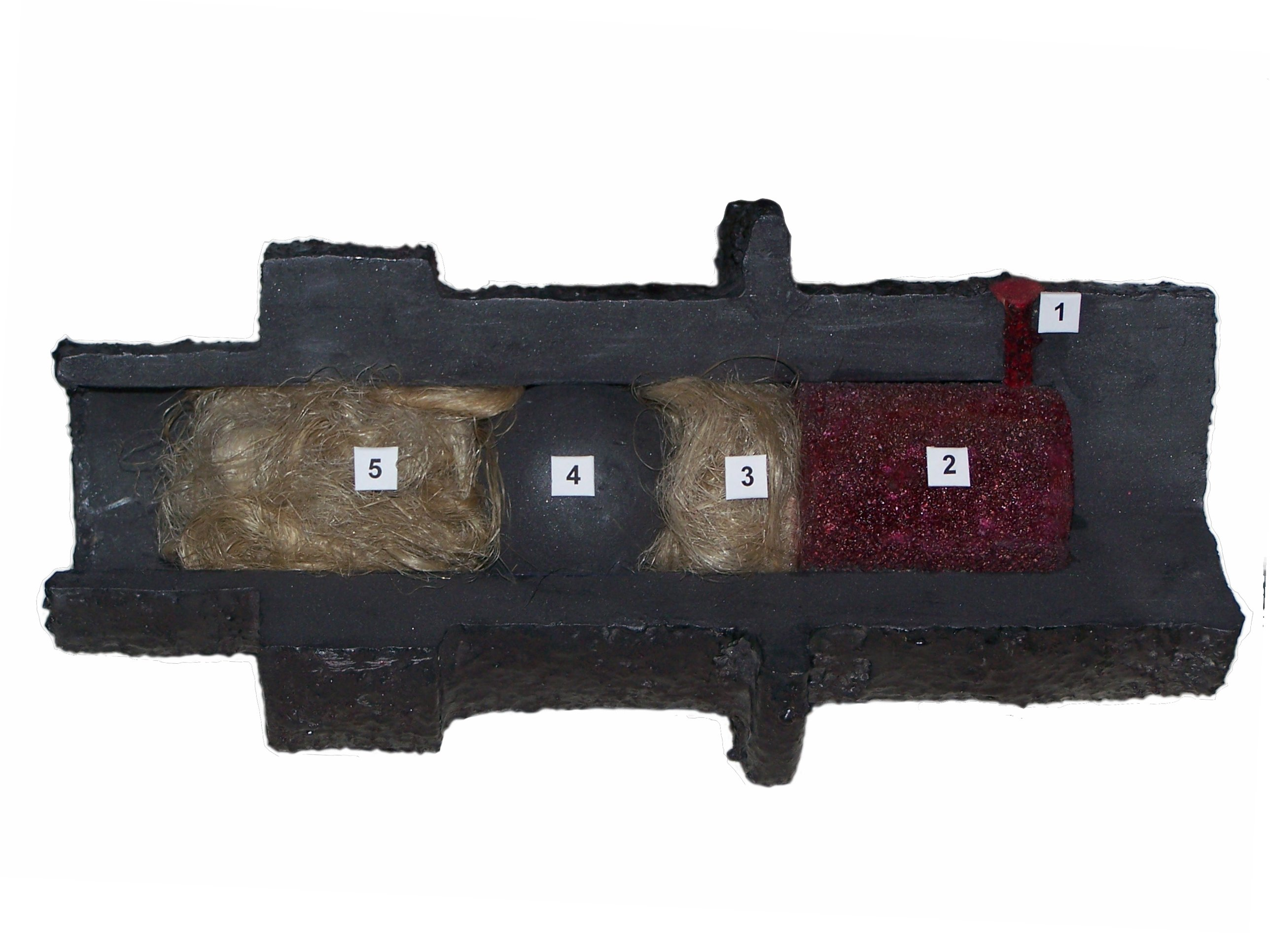
Loaded muzzleloading cannon. (1) Priming charge (2) Main propellant charge (3) Wadding (4) Projectile (5) Wadding

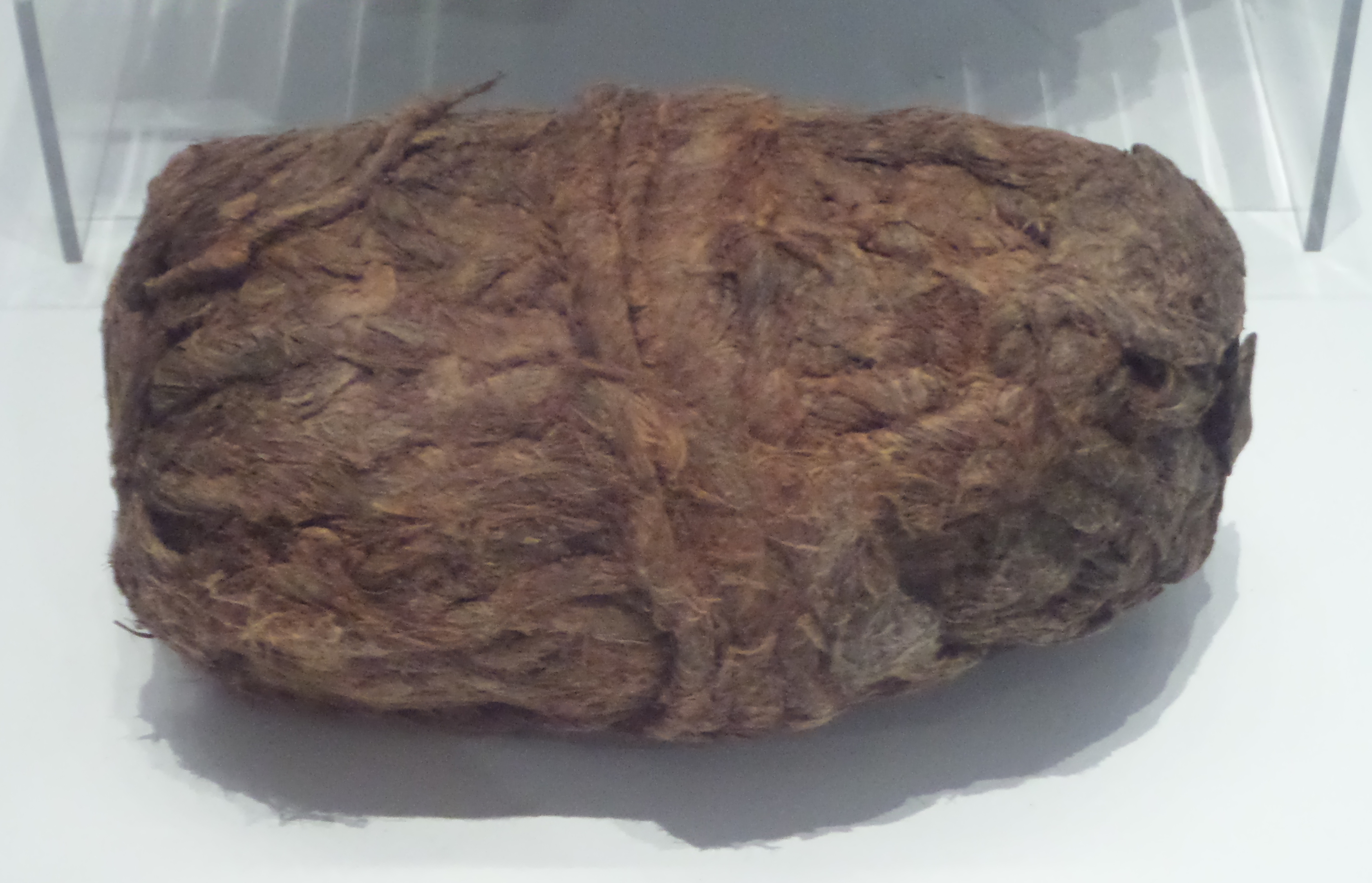
Wadding recovered from the wreck of the packet ship Hanover and was found inside a loaded cannon, National Maritime Museum Cornwall (2014)

In general, the sequence of loading is to put in first gunpowder, by pouring in a measured amount of loose powder, historically mostly by using a powder flask (or powder horn), or by inserting a pre-measured bag or paper packet of gunpowder (called a cartridge) or by inserting solid propellant pellets. The gunpowder used is typically black powder or black powder substitutes like Pyrodex. Sometimes two types of gunpowder (and two flasks) were used consisting of finer priming powder for the flash pan and coarser powder for the main charge behind the ball. This was particularly the case with earlier muzzleloaders like matchlocks but appear to have been less common with flintlocks and was irrelevant with percussion locks since they used percussion caps rather than priming powder.

Wadding is made from felt, paper, cloth or card and has several different uses. In shotguns, a card wad or other secure wadding is used between the powder and the shot charge to prevent pellets from dropping into the powder charge and on top of the shot charge to hold it in place in the barrel. In smooth bore muskets and most rifles used prior to cartridges being introduced in the mid-to late nineteenth century, wadding was used primarily to hold the powder in place.

On most naval cannons, one piece of wadding was used to hold the powder in place and served the purpose of creating a better seal around the shot. Another was used to act as a plug to stop the shot rolling out because of the swaying of the ship.

The use of cartridges with both gunpowder charge and ball, made up in batches by the shooter or a servant, was known from very early on, but until roughly around 1800 loading using a powder flask and a bag of balls was more common outside of the military. The measuring stage for the barrel charge of gunpowder could be avoided by carrying a number of pre-measured charges in small containers of wood, metal or cloth, often carried on a bandolier. These were known by various names, including "chargers" or "apostles" as 12 were often carried. For most of the time muzzleloaders were in use, a round ball and pre-measured powder charge could be carried in a paper or cloth wrapping. The shooter would bite off the end of the paper cartridge with his teeth and pour the powder into the barrel followed by the ball encased in the paper wrapping.

The projectiles and wads were then pushed down into the breech with a ramrod until they were firmly seated on the propellant charge. Priming powder could be carried in a separate priming flask and poured into the priming pan or a little powder from the cartridge was used, and the frizzen was pushed down to hold the priming powder in place. After the gunpowder and projectile or shot charge were placed in the barrel a ramrod was used to firmly pack everything down at the base of the barrel. Then either a priming charge was placed in the priming pan or a percussion cap was placed on the nipple, the firing mechanism initiated; the cock or hammer was then cocked to make the firearm ready to fire.

== Projectile types and history ==
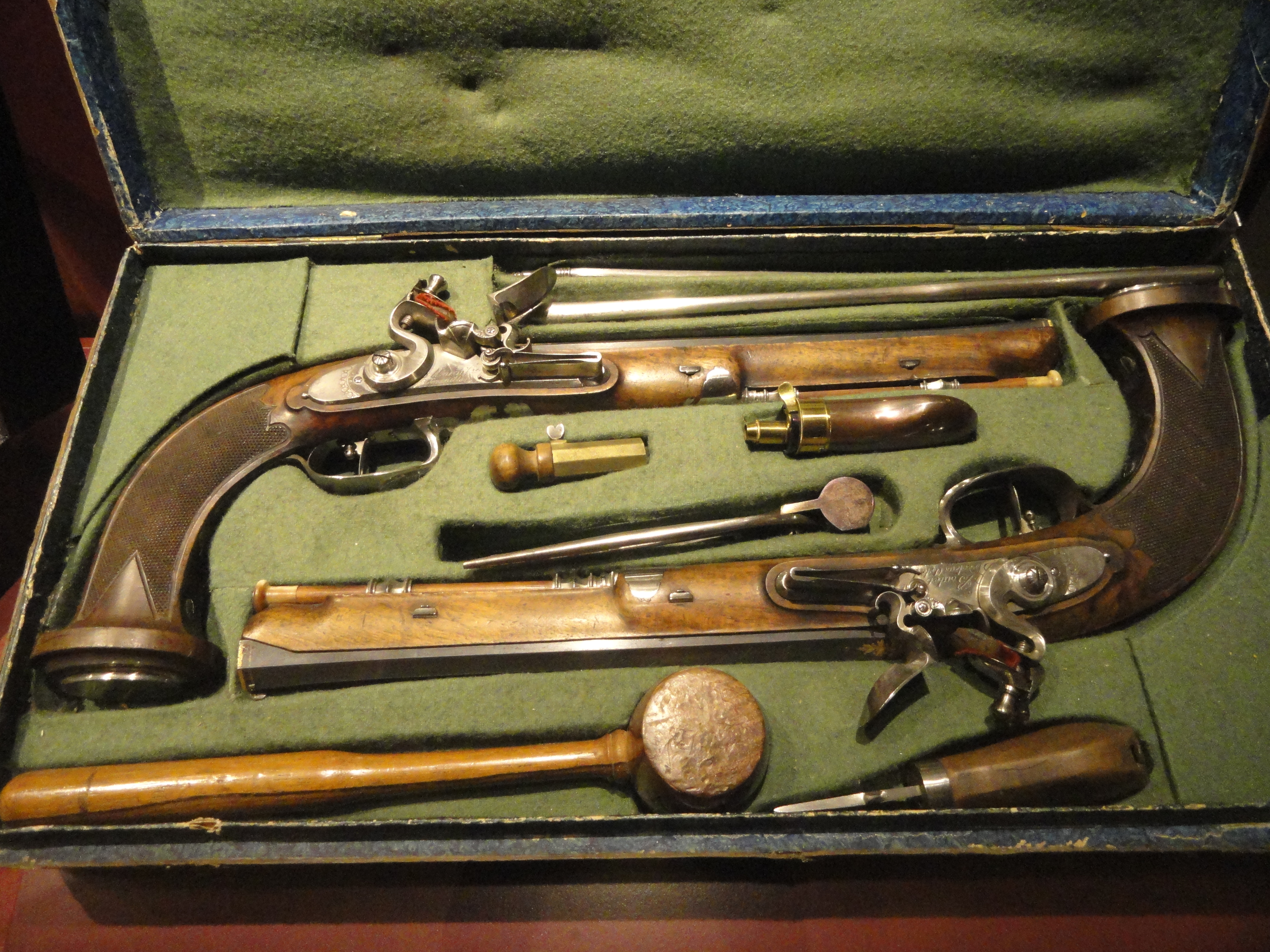
A pair of French rifled, flintlock, duelling pistols by Nicolas Noël Boutet 1794–1797. Royal Ontario Museum, Toronto, Canada. The set of accessories includes a small hammer as rifled pistols used slightly oversized bullets; a hammer was needed to drive the bullet down the barrel when loading.

Muzzleloading firearms generally use round balls, cylindrical conical projectiles, and shot charges.

In some types of rifles firing round ball, a lubricated patch (see Kentucky rifle) of fabric is wrapped around a ball which is slightly smaller than the barrel diameter. In other types of round ball firing rifles, a ramrod and hammer is used to force the round ball down through the rifling. When fired, either the lead ball or the wrapping grips the rifling and imparts spin to the ball which usually gives improved accuracy. In rifles firing Minié balls, the patch, often the paper wrapping from the cartridge, is used as an initial seal and to hold powder in place during loading.

The Minié ball replaced the round ball in most firearms, especially for military use, in the 1840s and 1850s. It has a hollow base which expands to grip the rifling. The combination of the spinning Minié ball and the consistent velocity provided by the improved seal gave far better accuracy than the smoothbore muzzleloaders that it replaced.

== Modern usage ==
When aiming for great accuracy, muzzle-loaders are usually cleaned ("swabbed") before reloading, so that there is no residue left in the barrel to reduce accuracy, though in competitions run by the international governing body, the MLAIC, this is prohibited for military rifle and musket events. However, in small arms muzzleloading rifles, swabbing is only done after every 5-10 shots. Large caliber muzzle-loaders such as cannons are always swabbed between shots to prevent accidents caused by live sparks igniting the fresh charge of powder as it is being loaded.

== Muzzleloading ==
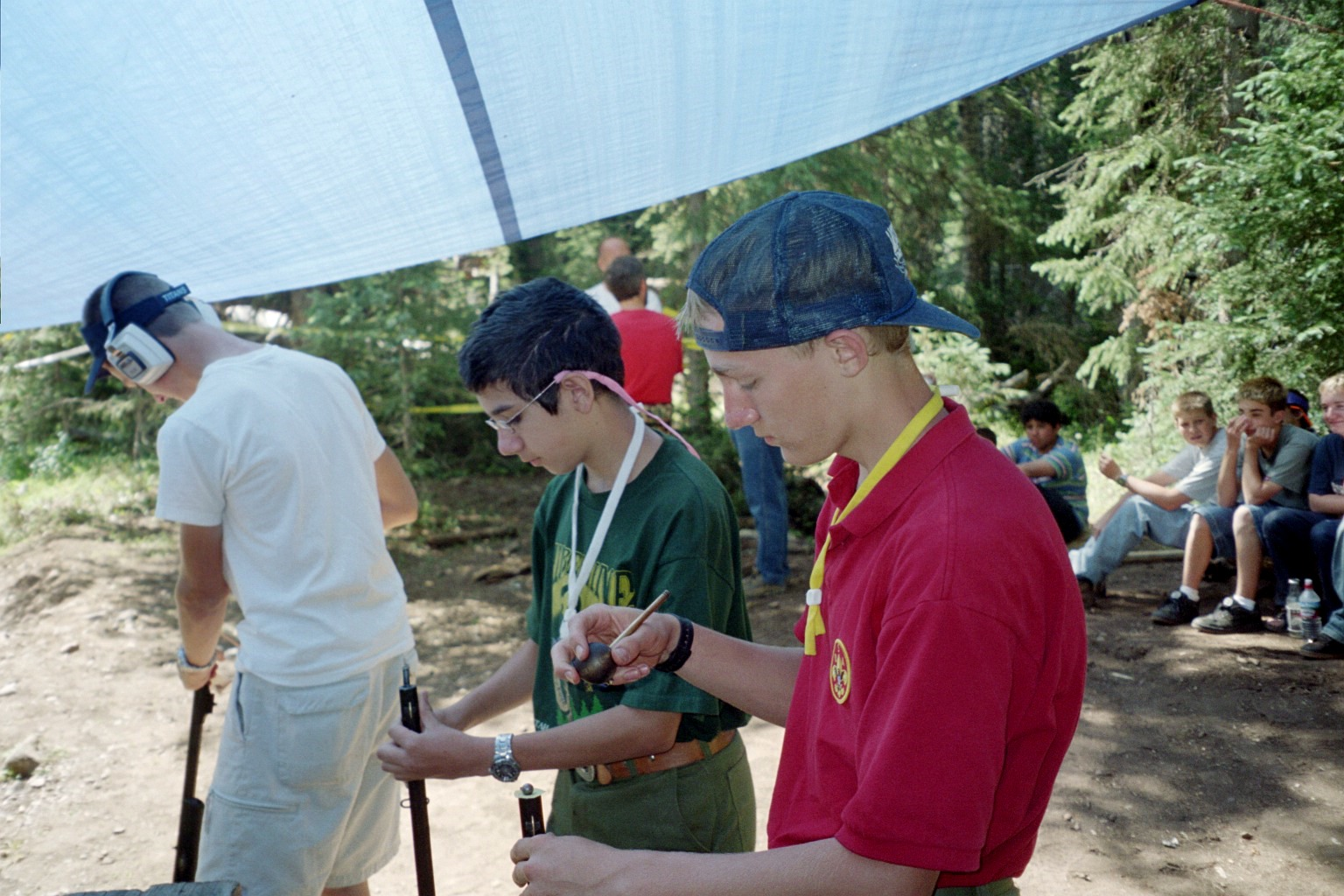
Varsity Scouts of the Boy Scouts of America learning about muzzleloading rifles

Muzzleloading is the sport or pastime of firing muzzleloading guns. Muzzleloading guns, both antique and reproduction, are used for target shooting, hunting, historical re-enactment and historical research. The sport originated in the United States in the 1930s, just as the last original users and makers of muzzleloading arms were dying out. The sport received a tremendous boost in the 1960s and 1970s. The Muzzle Loaders Associations International Committee (www.MLAIC.org) was formed in 1970 and held its first World Championship in 1971. Since then a flourishing industry manufacturing working reproductions of historic firearms now exists in the United States and Europe, particularly in northern Italy, for example at Gardone Val Trompia, in the Province of Brescia. In the United States muzzleloading guns are, subject to a number of qualifications, generally not considered firearms. Subject to state law they may be possessed by persons who might otherwise not be legally allowed to own a firearm.

The American National Muzzle Loading Rifle Association holds two national tournaments a year in Friendship, Indiana as well as the Western National Shoot Event held in Phoenix, Arizona.

The Muzzle Loaders Associations International Committee (MLAIC) governs international competition with muzzle-loading arms. The MLAIC holds a Short Range World Championship in even-numbered years and a Long Range World Championship (300–1,000 yd (270–910 m)) on odd numbered years (South Africa has won the last 5 Long Range World Championships).

=== Modern use ===
Driven by demand for muzzleloaders for special extended primitive hunting seasons, firearms manufacturers have developed in-line muzzleloading rifles with designs similar to modern breech-loading centerfire designs. Knight Rifles pioneered the in-line muzzleloader in the mid-1980s, manufacturing and selling them to this day. Savage Arms has created the 10ML-II, which can be used with smokeless powder, reducing the cleaning required. However, Savage has discontinued the production of smokeless muzzleloaders. Remington Firearms also have a muzzleloader in production, the model "700 Ultimate" or "700 SL Ultimate". There are several custom gun makers that are currently building smokeless muzzleloaders on new or donor bolt actions. American Gun Craft have released the ROTO 12 shotgun that uses black powder.

== Reversed chamber firearms ==
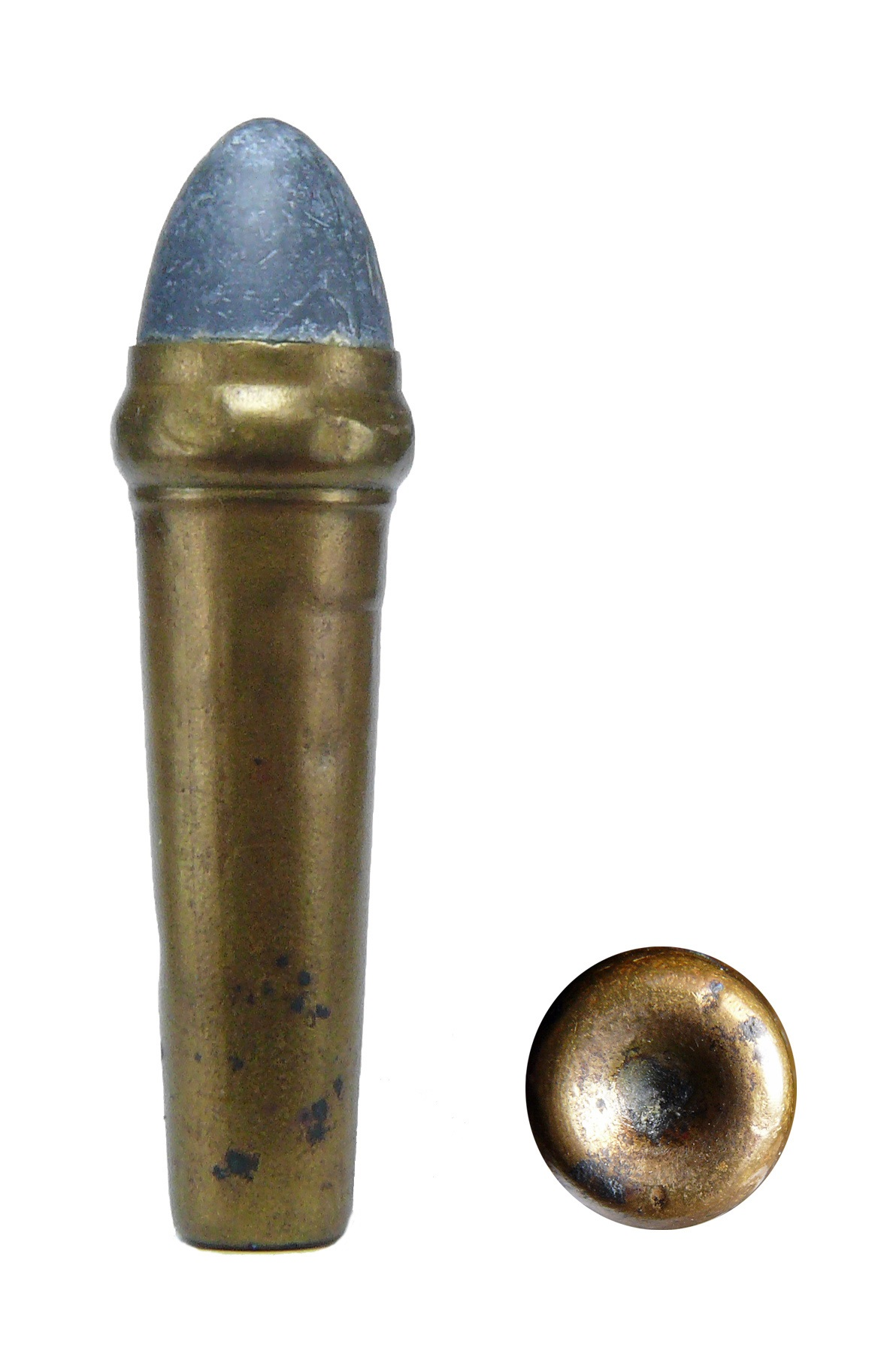
Reverse chambered .54 Burnside cartridge

An unusual reverse chamber has been used on firearms such as the Burnside carbine, Rikhter R-23 and T168 autocannons.

== See also ==
=== Related to muzzle-loading small arms ===
- Antique guns
- Black powder
- Breech-loading firearms
- Caplock mechanism
- Firearms
- Flintlock
- Matchlock
- Miquelet
- Musket
- Pepperbox
- Snaphance
- Snaplock
- Terzerol
- Wheellock

=== Related to muzzle-loading artillery ===
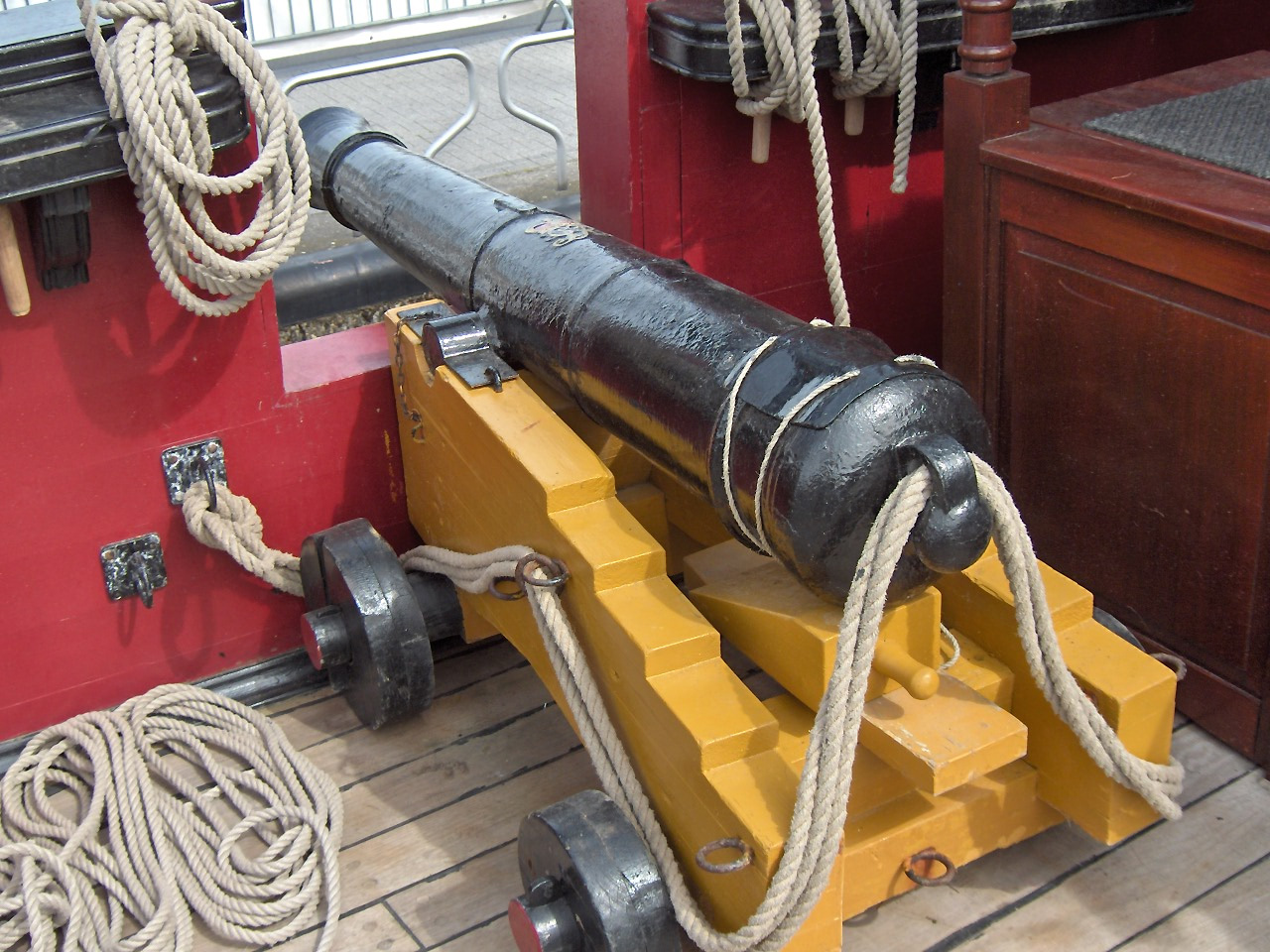
Muzzle-loading gun on its carriage

- Rifled muzzle loader
- List of muzzle-loading artillery
- Bombard
- Falconet
- Saker
- Cannon
- Demi-cannon
- Culverin
- Demi-culverin
- La Hitte system
- Minion
- Canon-obusier (gun-howitzer)
- ML 8 inch shell gun
- 68-pounder gun
- Parrott rifle
- 70 pounder Whitworth
- RML 68-pounder 64 cwt gun
- RML 7 inch gun
- 68-pounder Lancaster gun
- RML 12 inch 25 ton gun
- RML 12 inch 35 ton gun
- RML 17.72 inch gun, ("100-ton gun")
