= Olean, Indiana =

- Unincorporated community
- Location within Indiana Location within the United States
- Coordinates: 38°59′25″N 85°13′07″W
- Country: United States
- State: Indiana
- County: Ripley
- Township: Brown
- Elevation: 955 ft (291 m)
- Time zone: UTC-5 (Eastern (EST))
  - Summer (DST): UTC-4 (EDT)
- ZIP code: 47882
- Area codes: 812, 930
- GNIS feature ID: 440628

Olean is an unincorporated community in Brown Township, Ripley County, in the U.S. state of Indiana.

== History ==
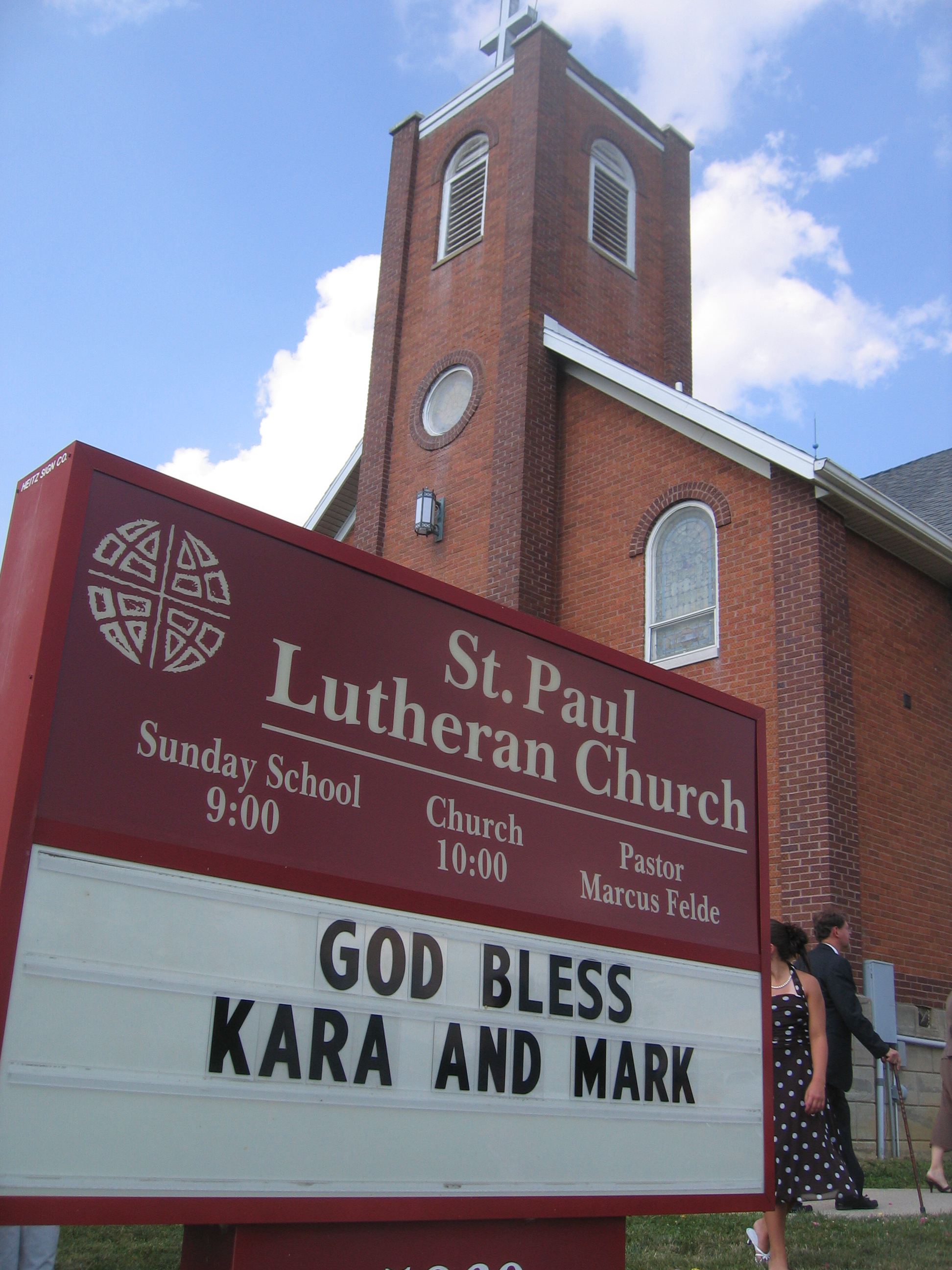
St. Paul Lutheran Church in Olean in 2007

Olean was laid out in 1858. The community was named after Olean, New York. A post office was established at Olean in 1844, and remained in operation until it was discontinued in 1905.

St. Paul Lutheran Church in Olean was recognized by the Indiana Senate in 2007 on its 150th anniversary.

== Geography ==
Olean lies on Indiana State Road 129 about 6 miles (9.7 km) south of Versailles and Versailles State Park. Cross Plains is 3.3 miles (5.3 km) south of Olean, and Friendship about 6.5 miles (10.5 km) southeast.
