= Oskar Becker (assailant) =

German fanatic and failed assassin (1839–1868)

- Оскар Беккер
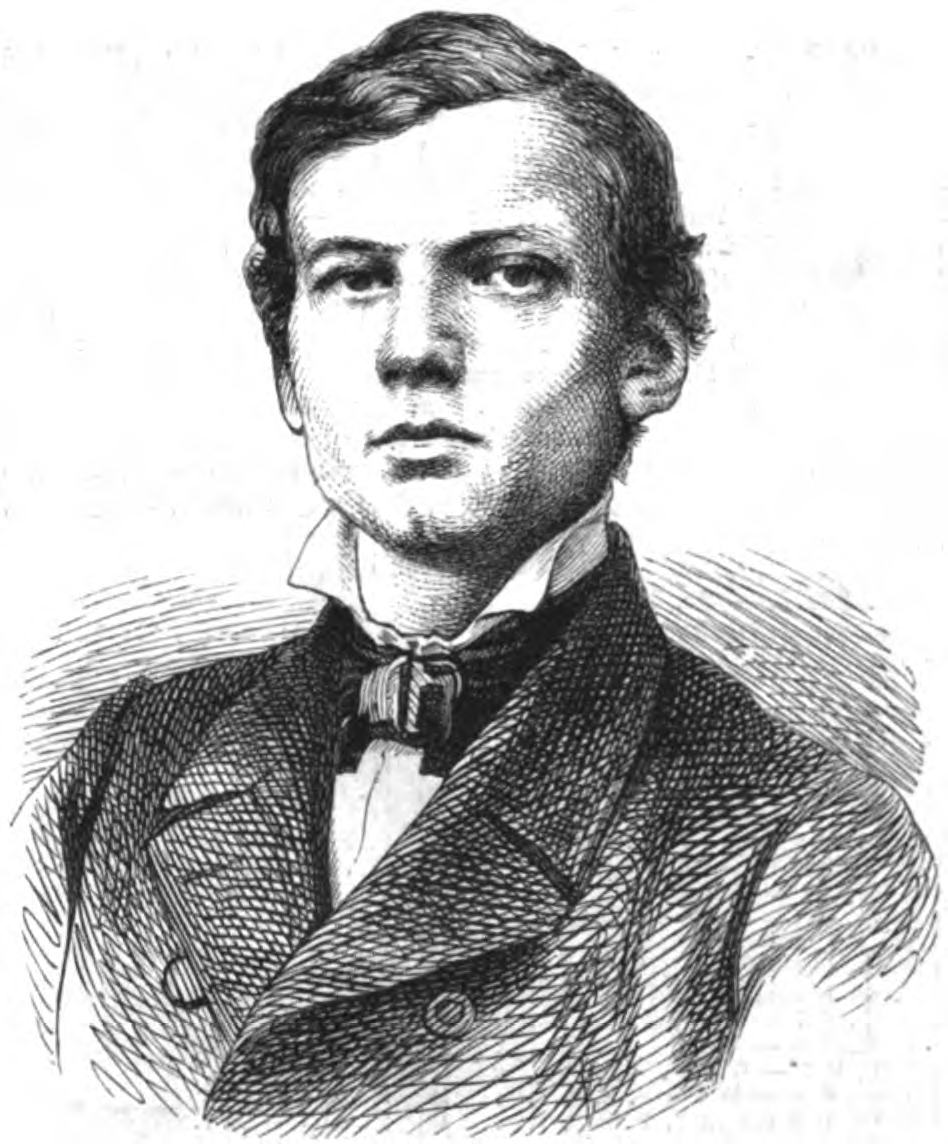
- Portrait of Becker from the Illustrirte Zeitung, 1861
- Born: Oskar Wilhelm Becker; 18 June 1839; Odessa, Kherson Governorate, Russian Empire
- Died: 16 July 1868 (aged 29); Alexandria, Khedivate of Egypt
- Education: Kreuzschule; Leipzig University
- Era: 19th century
- Known for: Attempted assassination of Wilhelm I
- Notable work: Das Buch des Fürsten (1859)
- Parents: Paul Adam von Becker (father); Elise Wilhelmine Becker née Dörstling (mother)
- Relatives: Paula Modersohn-Becker (niece)

Oskar Becker (18 June 1839 in Odessa – 16 July 1868 in Alexandria) was a German politic fanatic known for his attempted assassination of William I of Prussia. His niece was the German expressionist painter Paula Modersohn-Becker.

== Biography ==
In 1859 he enrolled at Leipzig University, and in 1861, at Baden-Baden, endeavored to kill king William I of Prussia by firing two shots from a Terzerol pistol, at a distance of three paces. However, the monarch suffered only a slight injury of the neck. The assailant, in a letter found upon him, stated as his motive the conviction that William was inept at the task of uniting Germany. The assailant was sentenced to twenty years' imprisonment, but was pardoned by the Badish sovereign, Frederick I, on William's plea, and released in 1866, with the stipulation that he should leave the German Confederation forever. He lived in Chicago for some time, and subsequently went to Alexandria, Egypt, where he died.
