= Brown Township, Ripley County, Indiana =

Brown Township
- Township
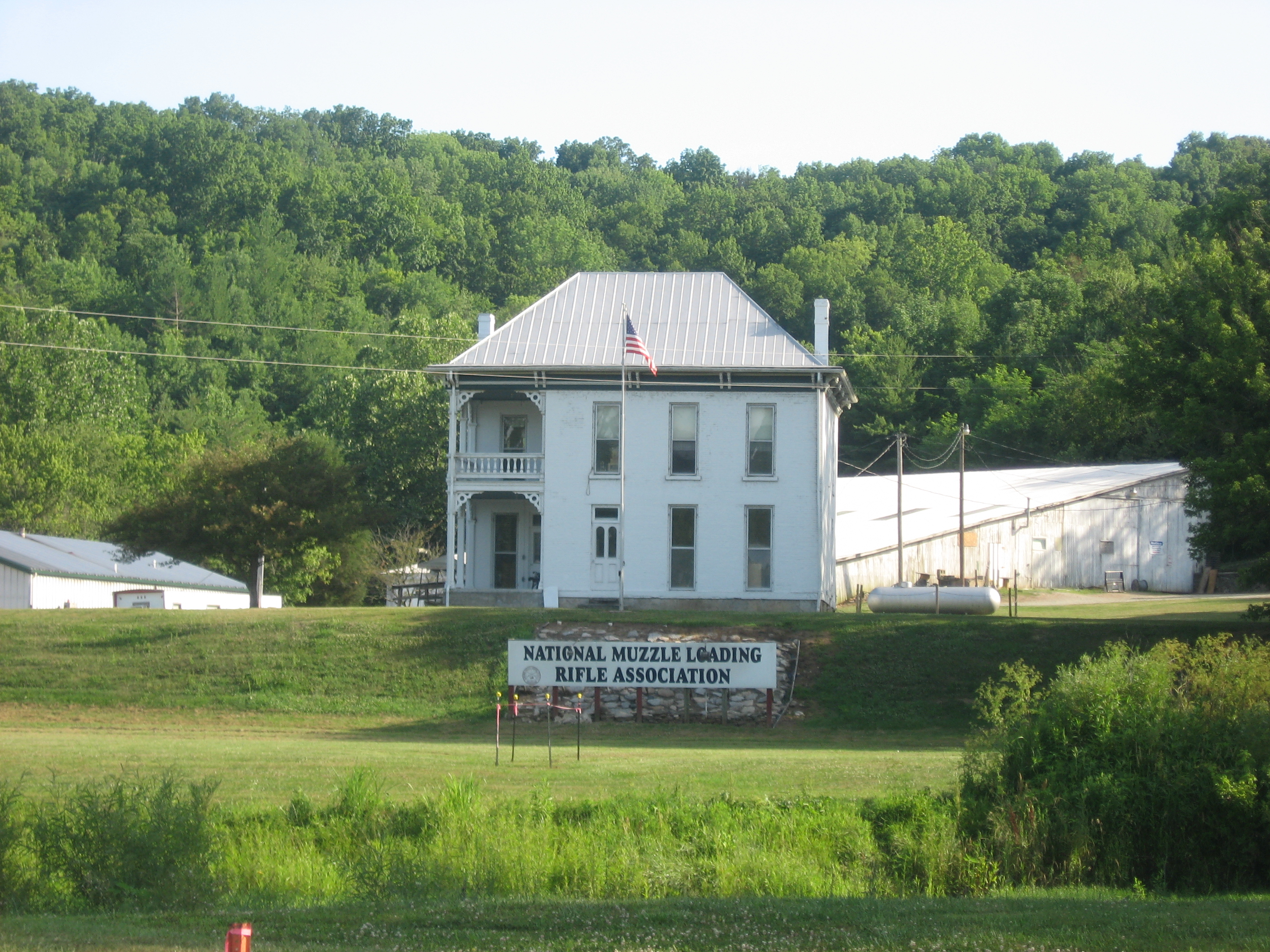
- The John Linsey Rand House at Friendship

- Coordinates: 38°57′57″N 85°13′07″W
- Country: United States
- State: Indiana
- County: Ripley

Government
  - Type: Indiana township

Area
  - Total: 53.67 sq mi (139.0 km^{2})
  - Land: 53.55 sq mi (138.7 km^{2})
  - Water: 0.12 sq mi (0.31 km^{2})
- Elevation: 948 ft (289 m)

Population (2020)
  - Total: 1,700
  - Density: 32/sq mi (12/km^{2})
- Area code: 812
- FIPS code: 18-08362
- GNIS feature ID: 453141

Brown Township is one of eleven townships in Ripley County, Indiana. As of the 2020 census, its population was 1,700 (up from 1,597 at 2010) and it contained 715 housing units.

Historical population
Census	Pop.	Note	%±
1890	1,850		—
1900	1,809		−2.2%
1910	1,771		−2.1%
1920	1,698		−4.1%
1930	1,470		−13.4%
1940	1,496		1.8%
1950	1,473		−1.5%
1960	1,413		−4.1%
1970	1,313		−7.1%
1980	1,461		11.3%
1990	1,418		−2.9%
2000	1,499		5.7%
2010	1,597		6.5%
2020	1,700		6.4%
Source: US Decennial Census

== History ==
John Linsey Rand House was listed on the National Register of Historic Places in 1994.

== Geography ==
According to the 2010 census, the township has a total area of 53.67 square miles (139.0 km^{2}), of which 53.55 square miles (138.7 km^{2}) (or 99.78%) is land and 0.12 square miles (0.31 km^{2}) (or 0.22%) is water.

=== Unincorporated towns ===
- Benham
- Cross Plains
- Friendship
- Olean
