= Cross Plains =

There are a few places named Cross Plains in the United States:

- Cross Plains, Alabama
- Cross Plains, Indiana
- Cross Plains, Kentucky
- Cross Plains, Tennessee
- Cross Plains, Texas
- Cross Plains (town), Wisconsin, partially containing the village of Cross Plains
  - Cross Plains, Wisconsin, a village
- Cross Plains Township, South Dakota
