= Nicholson–Rand House =

Historic house in Indiana, United States

- U.S. National Register of Historic Places
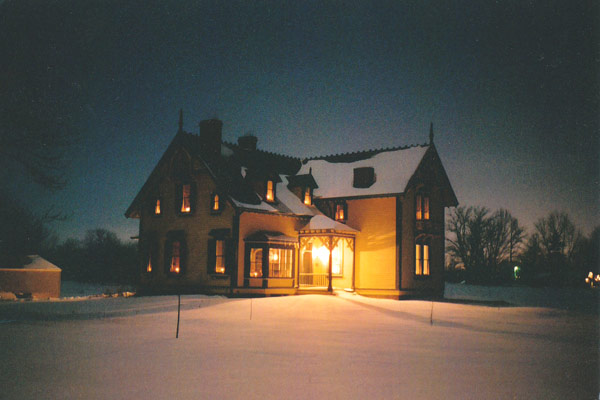

- Location within Indianapolis Location within Indiana Location within the United States
- Location: 5010 W. Southport Rd., Indianapolis, Indiana
- Coordinates: 39°39′38″N 86°14′46″W
- Area: 2 acres (0.81 ha)
- Architect: Nicholson, David; et al.
- Architectural style: Gothic Revival
- NRHP reference No.: 03000542
- Added to NRHP: June 22, 2003

The Nicholson–Rand House is a historic house located in Indianapolis, Indiana. It was moved half a mile south by the Historic Landmarks Foundation of Indiana (HLFI) to save it from being demolished in 1997 and added to the National Register of Historic Places (NRHP) in 2003. The house is an example of the Gothic Revival style of American architecture typified by Alexander Jackson Davis and Andrew Jackson Downing in the mid-19th century.

== Style ==
Andrew Jackson Downing advocated "truth in architecture" while celebrating the picturesque and asymmetrical, and the use of tracery and carving as ornamentation. The Nicholson–Rand House is an American version of Gothic Revival as developed by Downing, built with native materials. Downing's illustrations of country houses are reflected in this house's asymmetry, picturesque windows, projecting eaves with decorated rafter tails and brackets, board-and-batten siding beneath the gables, lacy bargeboard, the many dormers, the entrance porch with its chamfered posts and scrollwork brackets, and the shape of the chimneys. Still relatively rural today, in 1876 the house was two to three hours from downtown Indianapolis by horseback or wagon over twelve miles (19 km) of winding dirt roads. The nearest railroad depot was at Valley Mills, an hour's walk away.

Downing's principles anticipated several elements of Craftsman houses, and even the work of Frank Lloyd Wright, as noted by architectural historian Vincent J. Scully Jr. It is likely that the builder of the house, contractor and stonemason David Nicholson, was familiar with the popular books of Downing. His book Cottage Residences first appeared in 1842 and subsequent editions appeared regularly over the next three decades. Downing's The Architecture of Country Houses was published in 1850, shortly before Nicholson arrived in America. Nicholson likely gathered ideas from several other pattern books that proliferated in the 1860s and 1870s. The popular works of architect and engineer George E. Woodward, for example, whose designs to a great degree follow the lead of Davis and Downing may have influenced Nicholson. Woodward's two volume Architecture and Rural Art and his Country Homes and Woodward's National Architect were all published in the 1860s and reprinted numerous times. Elements of Nicholson's house are present in several patterns in each of Woodward's books, but the general influence still appears to derive from Downing.

Some of the materials incorporated in the Nicholson–Rand House appear to be identical to those being used in the Marion County Courthouse which Nicholson helped build. Nicholson was a prominent stonemason and partner in the business of Scott and Nicholson that constructed the stonework of the massive new courthouse designed by Isaac Hodgson. Its cornerstone was laid in 1872. Whether Nicholson purchased extra materials or was given overruns—or whether he saw them being installed in the courthouse and decided he would like the same for the house he was building for himself—is unknown. But local lore for over fifty years after spoke of wagonloads of material carted from the courthouse building site. The colored tile of the floors in three rooms of the house is the same as was in the courthouse, and the interior woodwork is similar.

== Builder and later owners ==
David Nicholson (1823–1899) was a stonemason born in Dumfriesshire, Scotland. He came to Indianapolis in 1852, and became the partner of fellow Scot, Adam Scott, who had also learned his trade in his homeland. Their stone yard, originally on Delaware Street between Washington and Maryland streets, was located from at least 1860 on Kentucky Avenue near the old Greenlawn Cemetery, just southwest of downtown. Nicholson and Scott both lived in houses near their business into at least the 1870s. Nicholson's wife Marion died in 1870, and it appears he soon married again, which may have provided the motivation to build a fine new house in the country near the villages of West Newton and Valley Mills. The house was completed in 1876, the same year as the courthouse, but the marriage apparently ended in divorce.

After working for years to complete the house, Nicholson sold the property to Allison C. Remy (1837–1918) in 1879. Remy was a Marion County Commissioner who had just that year completed his three-year term. A few years earlier, in 1875, he had built the Remy Hotel on the southwest quadrant of Monument Circle in downtown Indianapolis. The sale may effectively have been a trade; in any case, Nicholson ultimately became the proprietor of the hotel, which became the Brunswick Hotel, and Remy the owner of the house and land in Decatur Township. Remy owned several other parcels in the near vicinity on the opposite side of Spring Valley Road (today's Mann Road), totaling about 370 acres (1.5 km^{2}). He was a prominent horseman and raised champion trotters. It is uncertain whether Remy lived in Nicholson's recently built dwelling, although one reference in Sulgrove's 1884 History of Indianapolis suggests that he may have for a time. Apparently Remy rented it out to a succession of tenants during part of the 1880s. Ownership of the house over the next decade is unclear, although at one point William H. H. Miller, United States Attorney General under President Benjamin Harrison and his former law partner, is said to have lived in the house, although only family history supports this contention.

On March 28, 1903, John Lindsay Rand and his wife acquired the house and property, leaving Friendship, Indiana. Their property in Friendship, the John Linsey Rand House, is also NRHP-listed. The Frank Copeland family was renting the house at the time, and continued to live there for another year, while they were having another house built for themselves. The Rands moved to the area in order to be closer to their only surviving child, daughter Florence, who was married to prominent Indianapolis attorney Wymond Joe Beckett. Beckett himself owned considerable farm acreage in the vicinity, but he and his wife lived in Indianapolis. The Rands lived in the house for the remainder of their lives, then Florence Beckett inherited the property in 1926. The combined Beckett farm encompassed about 600 acres (240 ha). The house was then rented to the manager of the farm's dairy operation, and later in the 1930s, to other tenants. The son of the Becketts, Joe Rand Beckett, an attorney like his father, moved into the house about 1940 and lived there with his wife Mary Ann until his retirement in the late 1950s, at which point the Becketts donated the farm to DePauw University. They continued to live in the house for a time, alternating with a home in Florida. Beckett died in Florida in 1977, whereupon his wife returned to Indiana, living out her days in Greenwood until her death in 1996. Ultimately the university had sold the house and it ended up with an out-of-state owner who wanted the property for residential and commercial development. In 1997, HLFI stepped in to save the house, and when the owner could not be persuaded to alter his plans, the organization found an available parcel about a half mile down Mann Road and moved the house to its present site.

== See also ==
- National Register of Historic Places listings in Marion County, Indiana

== Bibliography ==
- Baist, G. William, comp. Real Estate Atlas of Surveys of Marion County, Indiana. Philadelphia 1909.
- Bohn, Gustav, comp. Atlas of Indianapolis and Marion County, Indiana. Philadelphia 1889.
- Distler, A. David. "The Rand Home." Unpublished genealogical research paper, 1996.
- Downing, A[ndrew] J[ackson]. The Architecture of Country Houses. New York 1850.
- Downing, A[ndrew] J[ackson]. Cottage Residences. New York 1873.
- Guthrie, Wayne. "Twin Barns Serve as Landmarks." Indianapolis News, April 14, 1959.
- Indianapolis City Directories. 1857–1890.
- Nicholson Grave Marker, Section 2, Lot 156, Crown Hill Cemetery, Indianapolis.
- Scully, Vincent J. Jr. The Shingle Style and the Stick Style: Architectural Theory and Design from Downing to the Origins of Wright. New Haven, CT 1971.
- Sulgrove, B[erry] R[obinson]. History of Indianapolis and Marion County, Indiana. Philadelphia 1884.
- Woodward, George E. Architecture and Rural Art, Vol. I. New York 1867.
- Woodward, George E. Architecture and Rural Art, Vol. II. New York 1868.
- Woodward, George E. Woodward's Country Homes, A New, Practical and Original Work on Rural Architecture. New York 1865.
- Woodward, George E. Woodward's National Architect. New York 1869.
