= Indiana limestone =

Limestone quarried in Indiana, United States

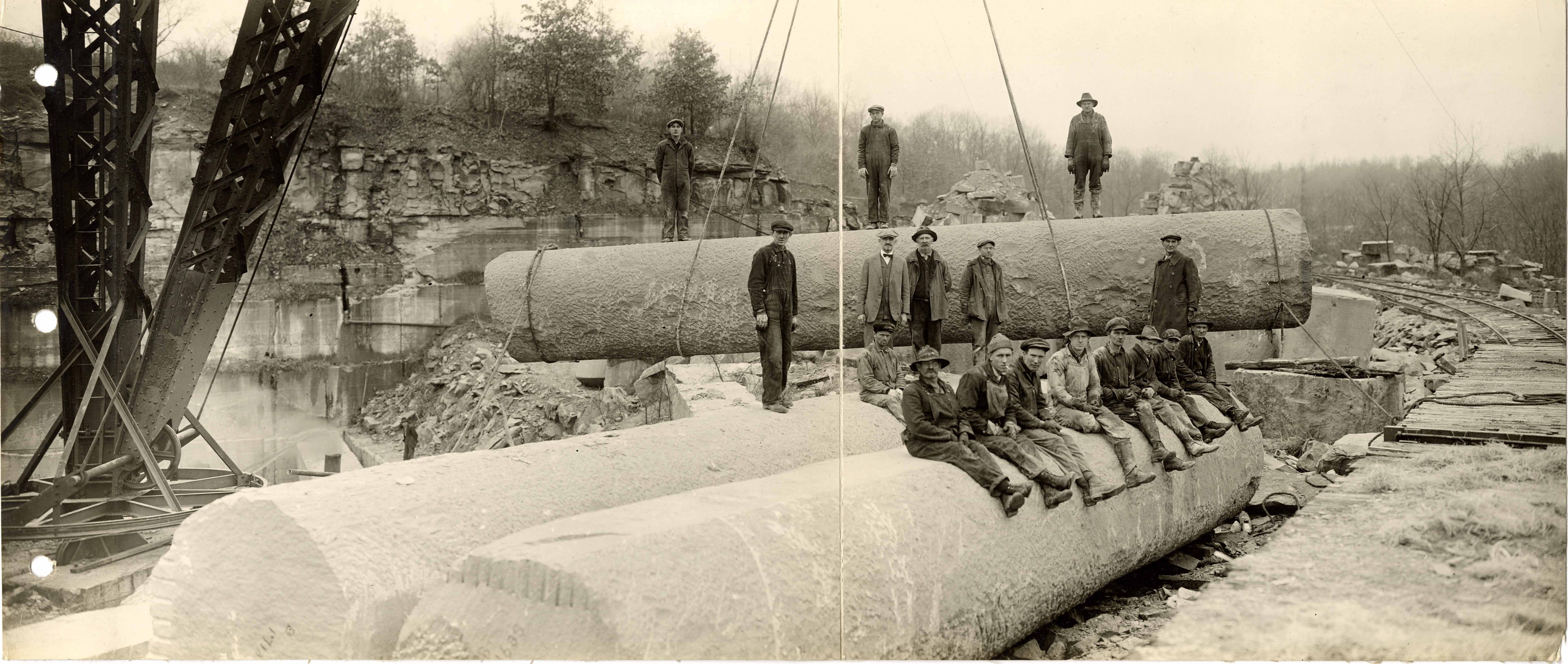
Indiana limestone being quarried in the early 20th century.

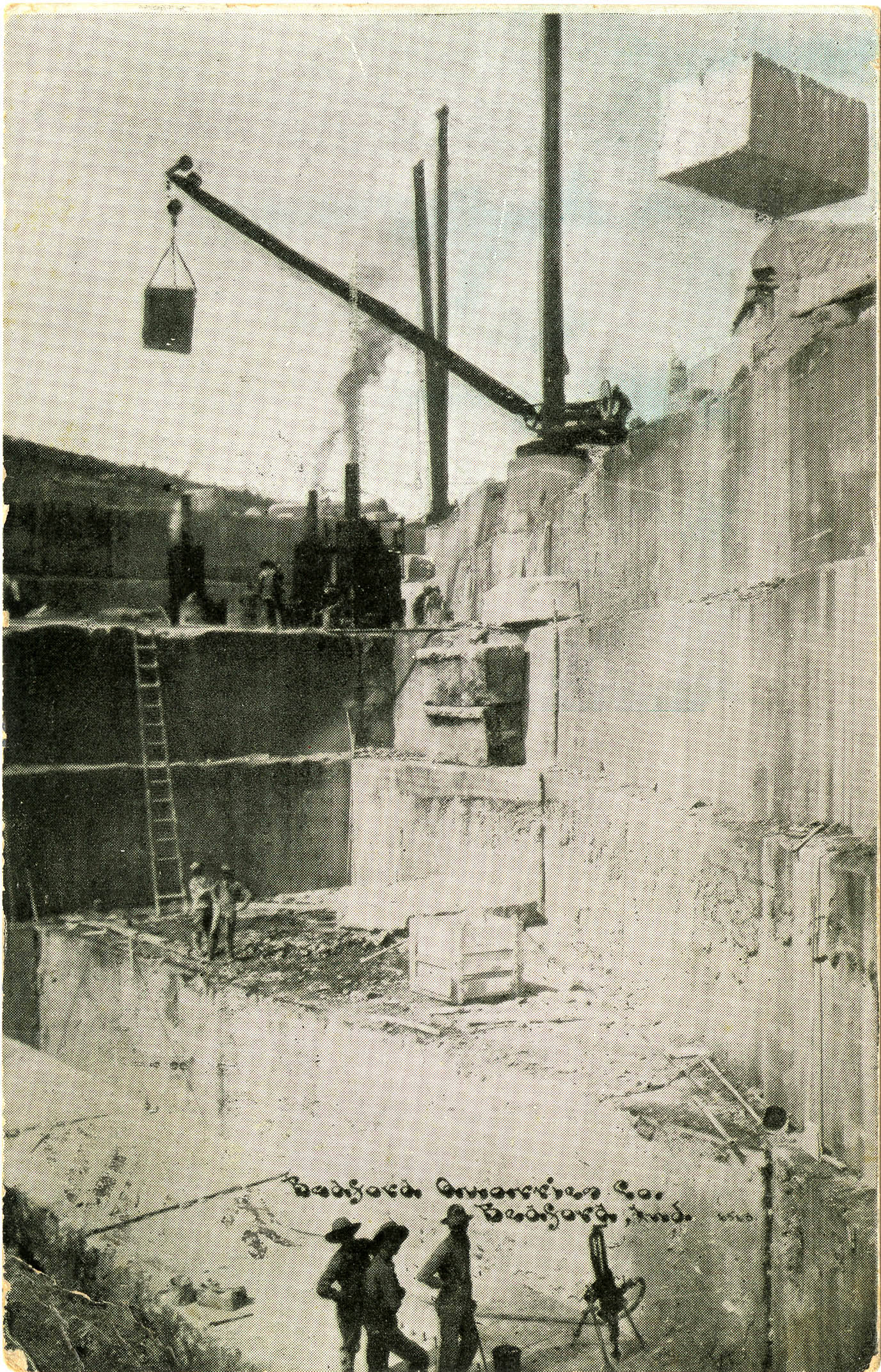
Postcard of Bedford Quarries Co. in Bedford, Indiana

Indiana limestone (also known as Bedford limestone) is a form of limestone used as a building material, particularly for monumental public structures. Some 35 of the 50 state capitol buildings in the United States are made of Indiana limestone, as are the Empire State Building, Biltmore Estate, the Pentagon and National Cathedral in Washington, D.C..

Indiana limestone is a more common term for Salem Limestone, a geological formation primarily quarried in south central Indiana, US, between the cities of Bloomington and Bedford. It has been called the best quarried limestone in the United States.

Indiana limestone, like all limestone, is a rock primarily formed of calcium carbonate. It was deposited over millions of years as marine fossils decomposed at the bottom of a shallow inland sea which covered most of the present-day midwestern United States during the Mississippian period.

== History ==
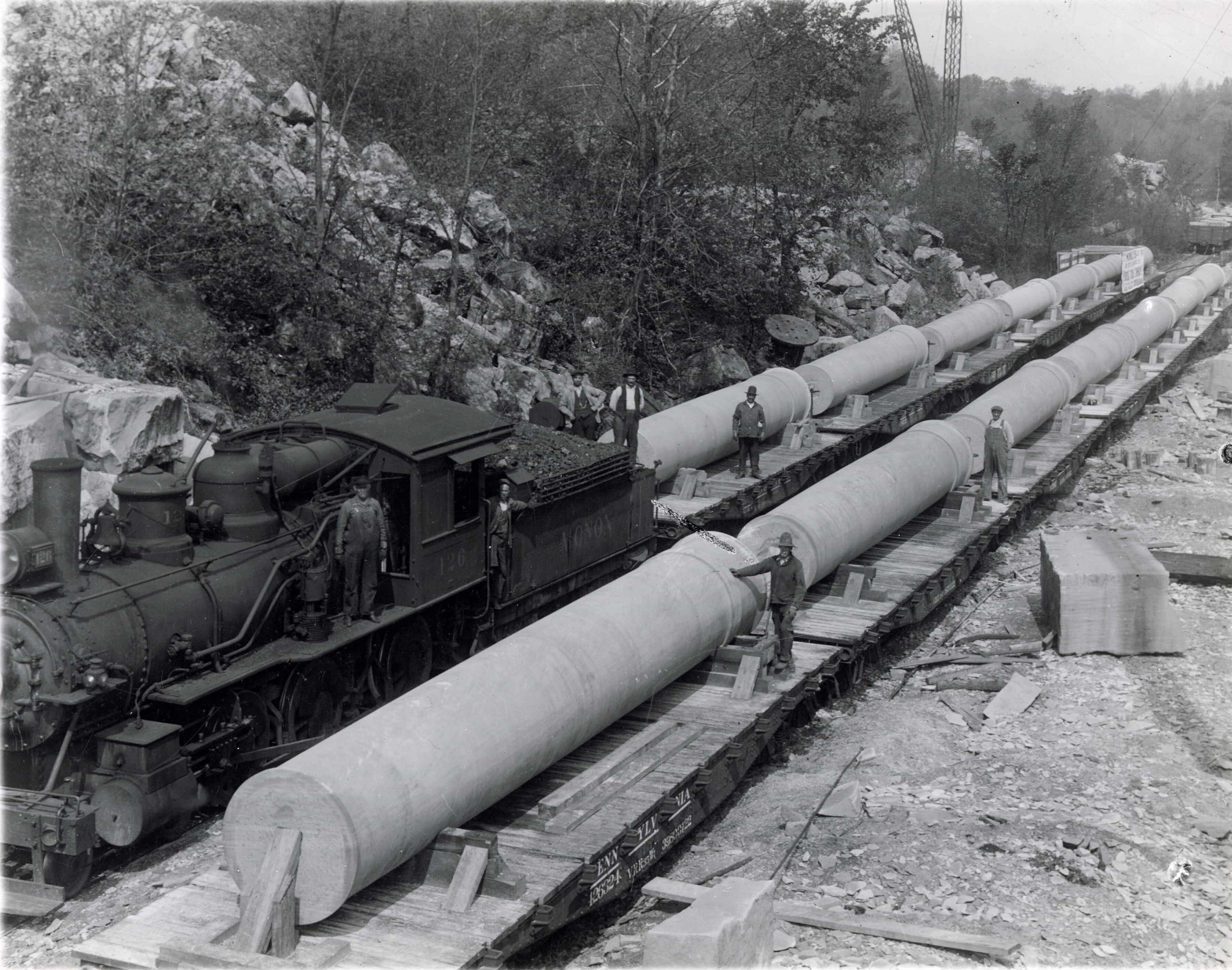
Indiana limestone loaded on freight trains in Bedford, Indiana.

Native Americans were the first people to discover limestone in Indiana. Not long after they arrived, American settlers used this rock around their windows and doors and for memorials around the towns. The first quarry was started in 1827, and by 1929 Hoosier quarries yielded 12,000,000 ft^{3} (340,000 cubic meters) of usable stone. The expansion of the railroads brought great need for limestone to build bridges and tunnels and Indiana was the place to get it.

American architecture of the late 19th and early 20th century included a lot of limestone detail work on buildings, but as architectural styles changed, so did the demand for limestone. Indiana limestone was officially designated as the state stone of Indiana by the Indiana General Assembly in 1971. With the Arab Oil Embargo of 1973, the price of alternative building materials skyrocketed so Indiana limestone reemerged as an energy-efficient building material.

== Use in notable buildings ==
=== Local ===
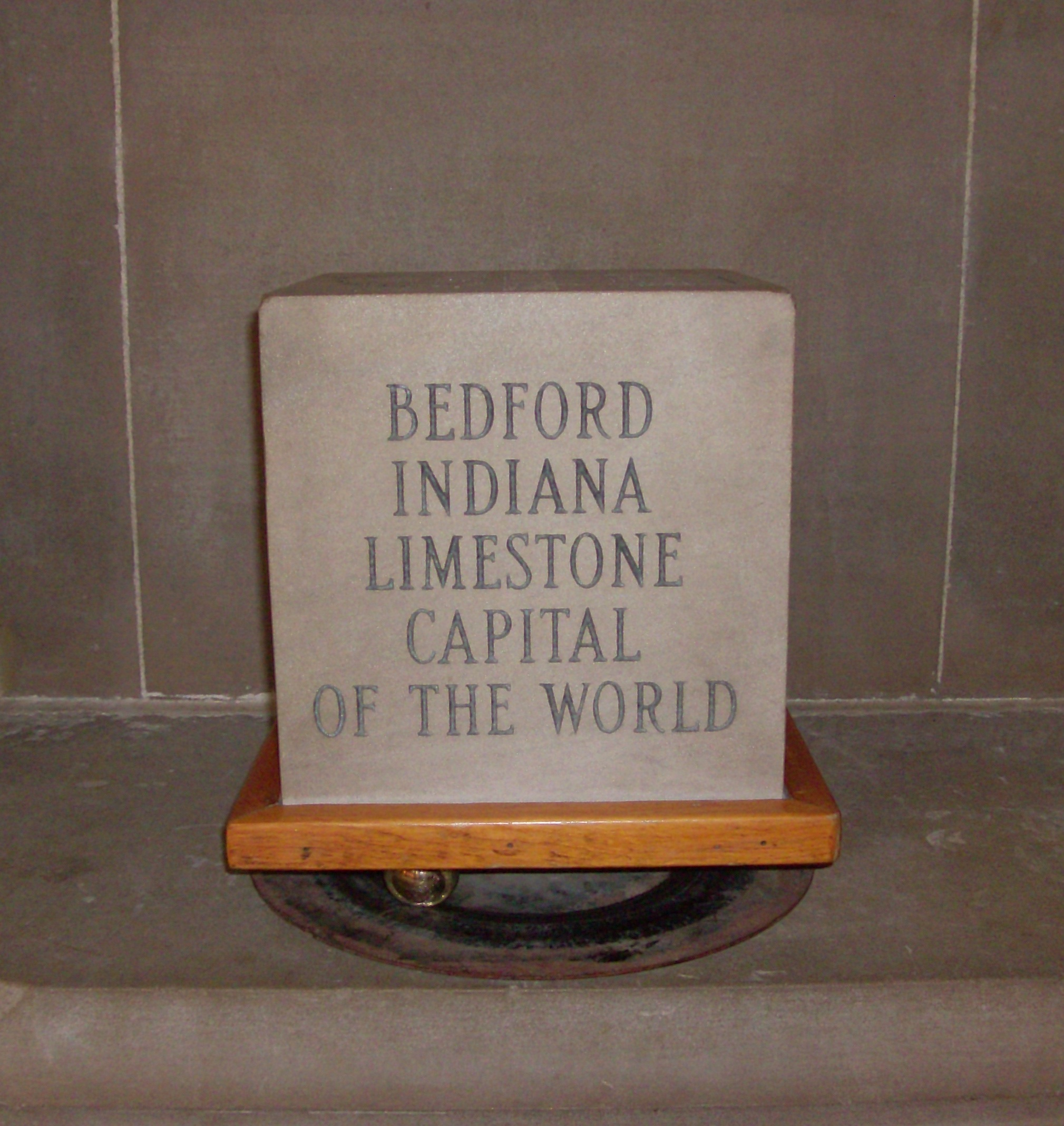
Exhibit at the Indiana State House touting Bedford, Indiana, as the "Limestone Capital of the World".

Many of Indiana's official buildings, such as the State capitol building, the monuments in Downtown Indianapolis, the Indiana University Robert H. McKinney School of Law, many university buildings, and the Indiana Government Center, and most of the state's 92 courthouses are all examples of Indiana architecture made with Indiana limestone. The majority of Indiana University, Bloomington, was constructed out of limestone. 1959's architecturally significant St. Augustine's Episcopal Church, in Gary, Indiana, uses Indiana limestone in the interior. The Saint Sava Serbian Orthodox Church in Merrillville, Indiana, consecrated in 1991 and awarded a Gold Medal Award for Excellence in Masonry Design, uses Indiana limestone on its exterior facade.

=== National ===
Nationally, Indiana limestone has long been part of a high-end market. It has mostly been used on the exteriors of homes and commercial and government buildings.

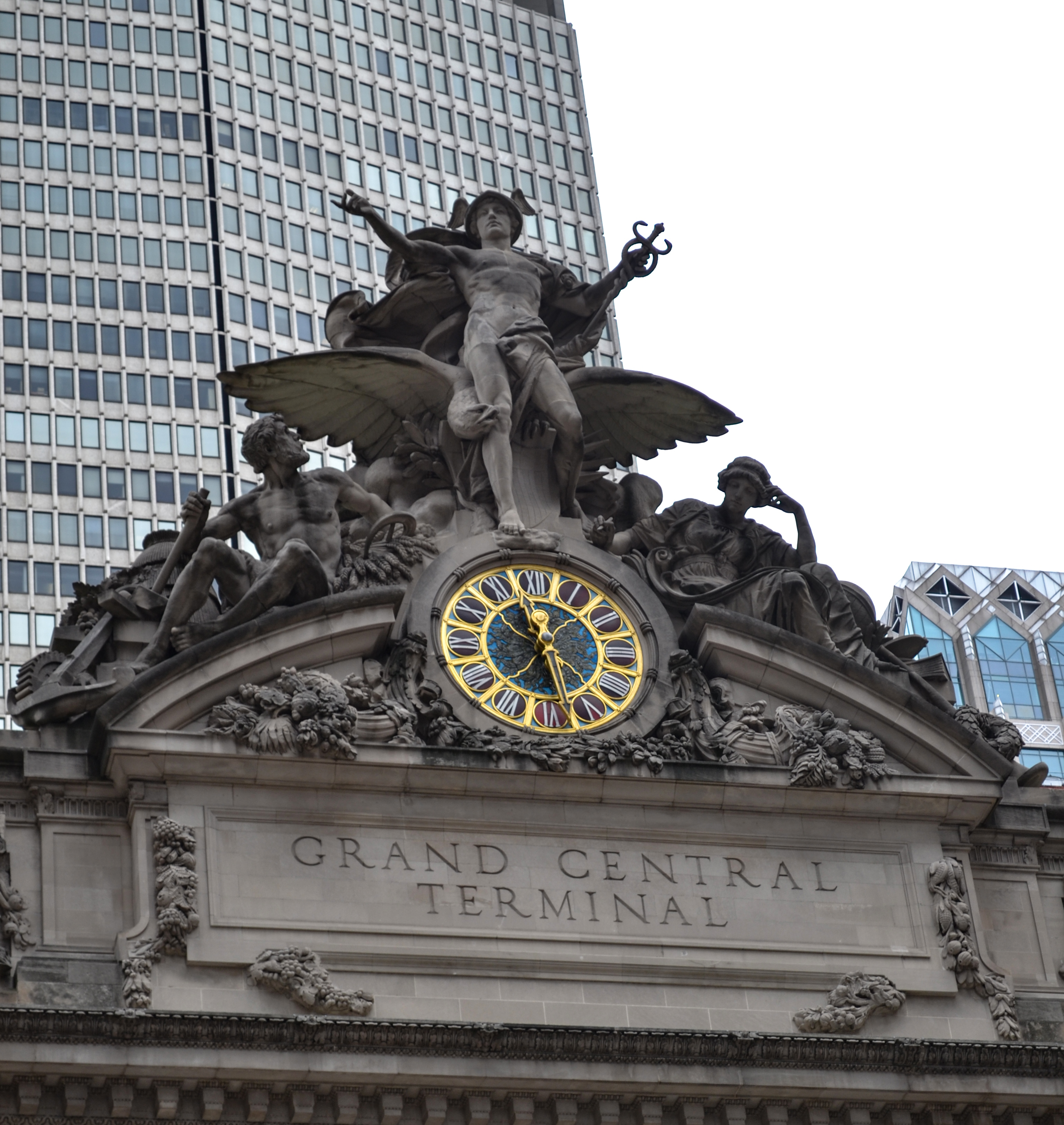
Glory of Commerce, a celebrated sculptural group atop the façade of New York's Grand Central Terminal, is made of Indiana Limestone.

Many prominent public buildings in the United States — such as the National Cathedral, Biltmore Estate, Empire State Building, Williamsburgh Savings Bank Tower, Winterthur Museum, Garden and Library, the Pentagon, The Crescent in Dallas, and the Hotel Pennsylvania — feature Indiana limestone in their exteriors. Some 35 of the 50 state capitol buildings in the United States are made of Indiana limestone. It was used extensively in rebuilding Chicago after the Great Chicago Fire of 1871. The sculptural group atop the main façade of New York City's Grand Central Terminal — known as Glory of Commerce — is made of Indiana Limestone. (A work by Jules-Félix Coutan, it includes representations of Minerva, Hercules, and Mercury and, at its unveiling in 1914, was considered the largest sculptural group in the world.

The original 1930s buildings of Rockefeller Center use limestone from Bedford. In 1955 the Tennessee State Capitol exterior was renovated using Indiana limestone to replace the poorer-quality Tennessee limestone that had started to deteriorate. Some 15,000 cubic feet of Indiana limestone was used in the rebuilding of the Pentagon after the terrorist attack of Sept. 11, 2001. The new Yankee Stadium in the Bronx, which opened in 2009, extensively uses Indiana limestone paneling on its exterior facade.

Indiana limestone has been particularly popular for the construction of university buildings. The Neo-Gothic campus of the University of Chicago is almost entirely constructed out of Indiana limestone; in keeping with the trend of post-Fire buildings using the material. The campus of Washington University in St. Louis – both for new construction and original buildings – makes use of Indiana limestone in its collegiate gothic architecture. Many buildings on the north side of Michigan State University use Indiana limestone. The Cathedral of Learning, a 42-story neo-gothic skyscraper that is the largest educational building in the Western Hemisphere, along with other nearby buildings of the University of Pittsburgh, are clad in Indiana limestone. The St. Anthony Society Chapter House at Yale University also is built of Indiana limestone. Many of the gargoyles on the buildings of Princeton University were carved from Indiana limestone, including "Flute Player", located on the exterior of Firestone Library. Both structures of the Kenosha County Courthouse and Jail in Kenosha, Wisconsin, were built out of the limestone. This stone was used as far north as the Hotel Macdonald in Edmonton. The Nebraska State Capitol was clad in Indiana Limestone after native limestone was deemed too prone to weathering.

Because of the awareness of acid rain, which wears Indiana Limestone relatively quickly, the stone is not as often used in monuments today as it was in the 19th and early 20th centuries.

=== Canada ===
The limestone has been used in significant buildings in Toronto:

- Canada Life Building, Toronto 1931
- Canadian Pacific Building, Toronto - recladded in 1929
- Fairmont Royal York, Toronto 1931
- Lillian Massey Building, Toronto 1913
- Toronto Harbour Commission Building 1917 (mix of Indiana and Queenston limestone)
- Union Station (Toronto) 1927 (mix of Indiana and Queenston limestone)

== See also ==
- List of types of limestone
- Statue of Hope — Limestone Memorial Statue, Friendship, Indiana
