= Knight Rifles =

- Industry: Arms industry
- Founded: 1985
- Founder: Tony Knight
- Headquarters: Athens, Tennessee, United States
- Products: Muzzleloading rifles
- Website: www.muzzleloaders.com

Knight Rifles is an American manufacturer of modern muzzleloading rifles and shotguns that pioneered the in-line muzzleloader in the mid-1980s. The company was founded in 1985 by Tony Knight, a gunsmith from rural Worthington, Missouri, and is now owned by PI, Inc. Originally, Tony built the guns by hand one at a time in his garage, and as demand increased, their first factory was built in 1987 in Lancaster, Missouri. Over the next few years, demand increased dramatically, and a new, larger factory was built in Centerville, Iowa. The company was sold to father/son duo Dale and Bruce Watley in 1991, and then to Pradco in 1999. Under Pradco’s ownership, Knight Rifles sales decreased and in 2009, the Knight Rifles product line was closed. In 2011, Knight Rifles was purchased by Plastic Industries, Inc. and is now headquarters in Athens, Tennessee, although the warranty center remains in Centerville, IA.
