= John Linsey Rand House =

Historic house in Indiana, United States

- John Lindsay Rand House
- U.S. National Register of Historic Places
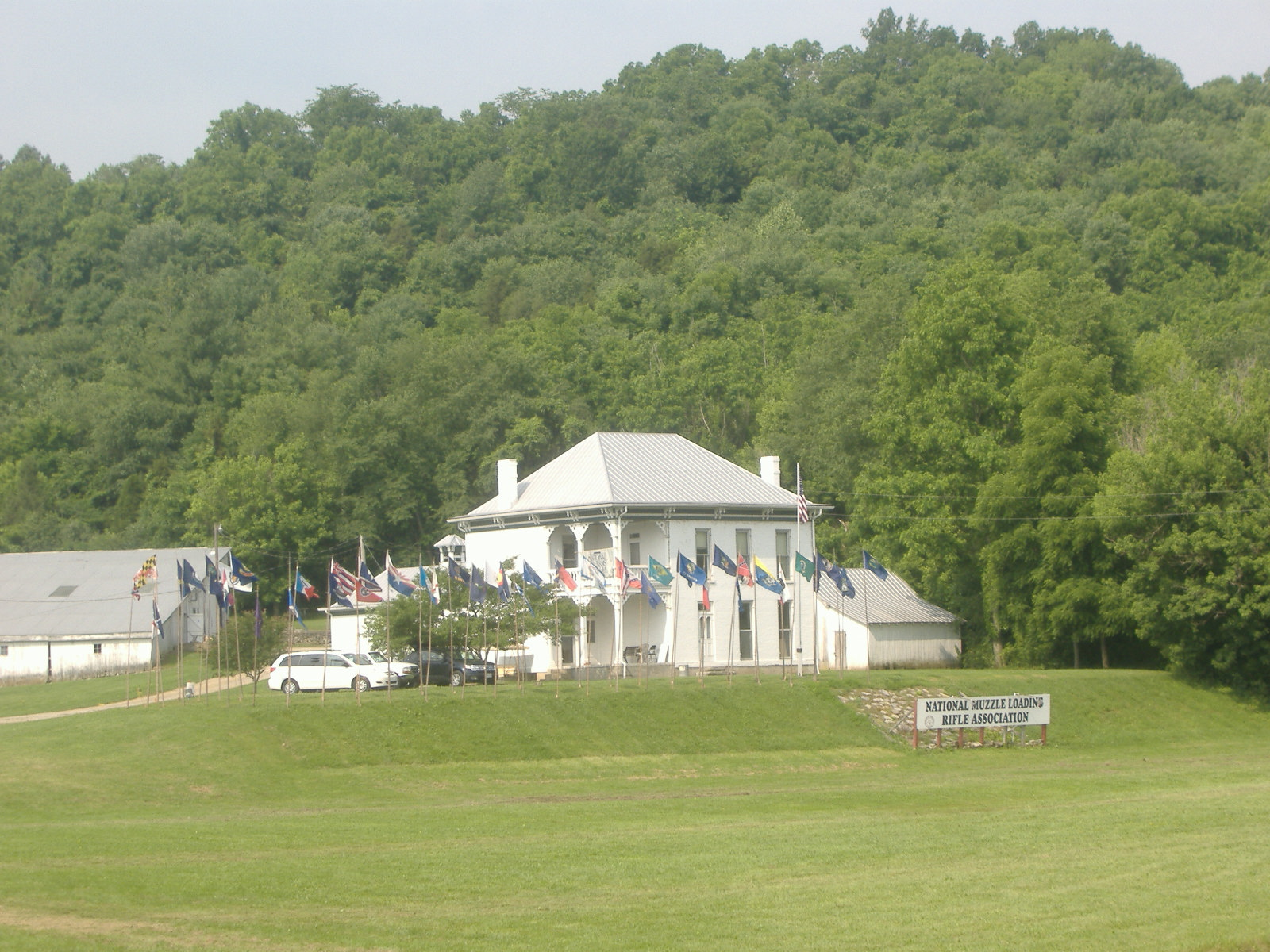

- Location within Indiana Location within the United States
- Location: Southwestern corner of the junction of State Road 62 and Maxine Moss Dr. at Friendship, Indiana
- Coordinates: 38°57′55″N 85°8′45″W
- Area: 4 acres (1.6 ha)
- Built: 1878
- Architectural style: Italianate
- NRHP reference No.: 94000582
- Added to NRHP: June 10, 1994

The John (Linsey) Lindsay Rand House is a historic home located at Friendship, Indiana, United States. It is owned by the National Muzzle Loading Rifle Association for use as their national headquarters and offices.

It was added to the National Register of Historic Places in 1994.

== Style ==
It was built between 1875 and 1878, and is a two-story, "L"-plan, Italianate style brick dwelling. It consists of a roughly square hip roofed main block with a one-story rear kitchen wing. The Italianate style was popularized in the United States by Alexander Jackson Davis in the 1840s as an alternative to Gothic or Greek Revival styles.

== Builder and later owners ==
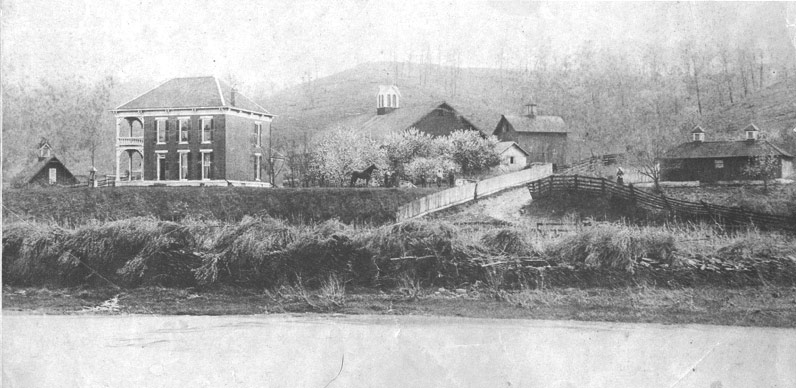
John L Rand Home circa 1880

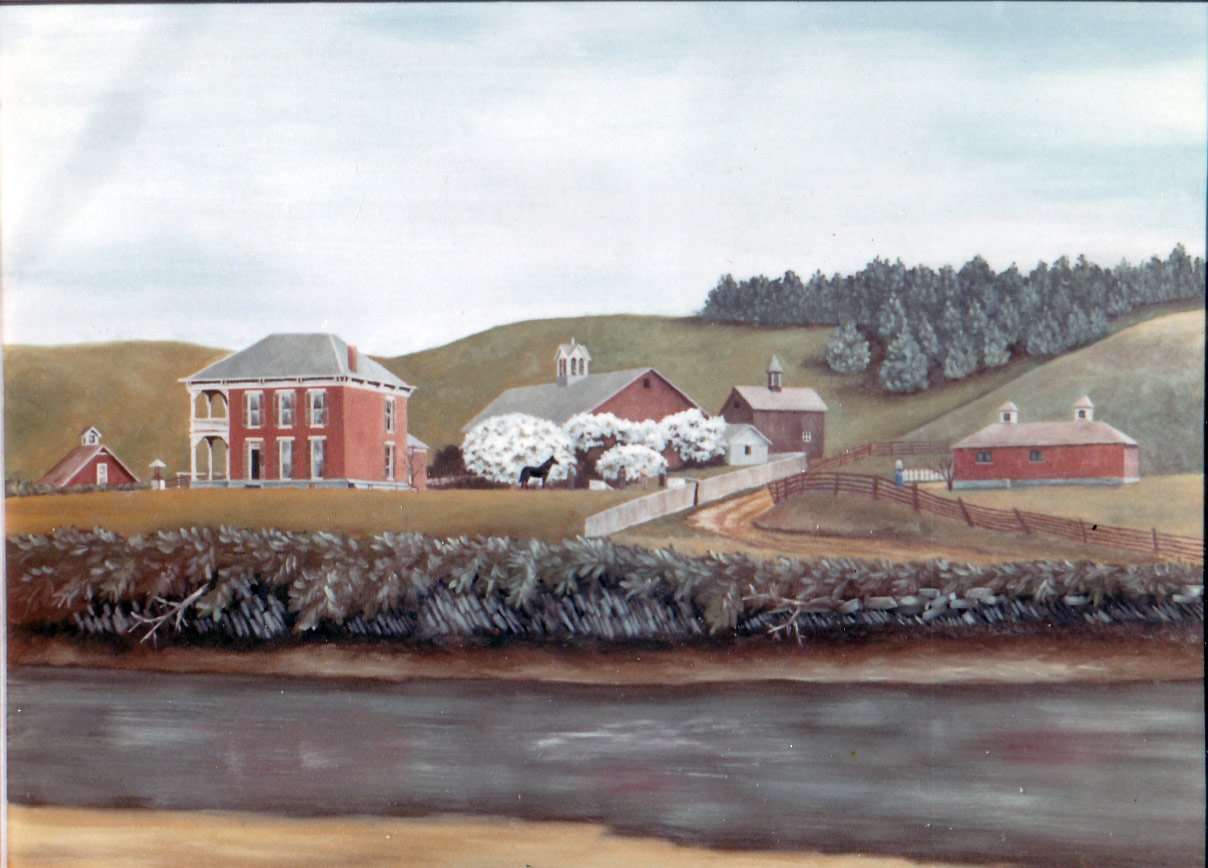
Oil Portrait from photo circa 1880

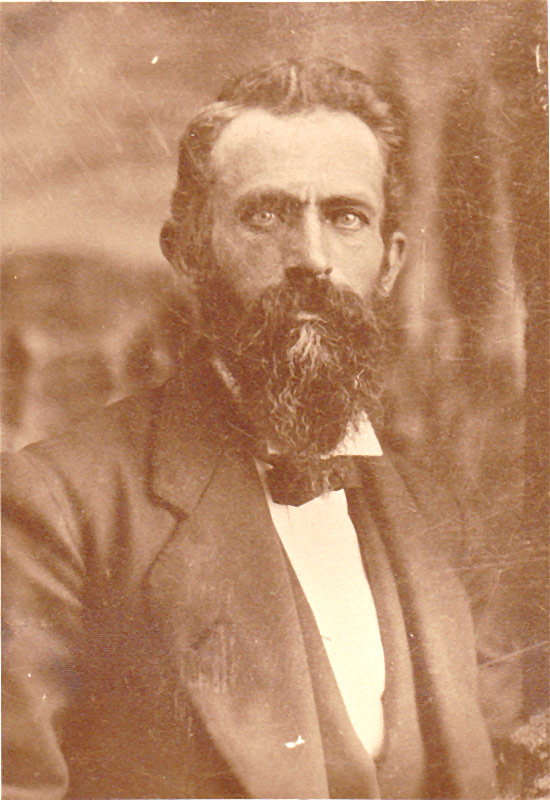
John L Rand circa 1880

The original property was owned by Thomas Wilson (1784–1874) and was part of an estate with several hundred acres. After his death, his land was divided amongst 3 heirs, including his daughter Elizabeth Ellen (Wilson) and her husband John L Rand.

John L Rand began construction of the house in 1875. The family, which included 1 boy and 2 girls, moved into the house in 1878. Within the next few years, the property was improved by the addition of a well house (far right in old photo), 3-story barn (just right of the house), granary (just right of the barn) and chicken house (far left).

The oil portrait to the left was commissioned in about 1880 from the original black-and-white photo and illustrates the original color scheme of the home and out buildings.

On March 28, 1903, John L Rand sold all of his Ripley County, Indiana property to John Paul and his son James, and moved to a farm in Marion County, Indiana. Ironically, his next home also carries his name and is listed on the National Register of Historic Places, the Nicholson-Rand House.

== See also ==
- Statue of Hope - Wilson Memorial, Friendship, Indiana
