= National Muzzle Loading Rifle Association =

The NMLRA Logo.

The National Muzzle Loading Rifle Association (NMLRA) is the largest membership based association in the sport of muzzleloading in the United States. The Association was founded in 1933 and is known for leading the effort to preserve the history of the United States through muzzleloading shooting sports & living history events.

== Membership ==
There are varying degrees of membership within the NMLRA, all of which entail paying dues to the Association.

The NMLRA has granted charters to local and regional muzzleloading gun clubs, groups, or associations in all fifty states in the United States as well as Canada. Generally, each of the charter clubs holds their own shoots and reports the results of the shoot to the NMLRA.

== Friendship, Indiana ==
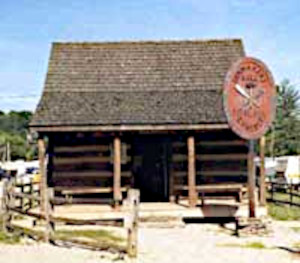
Gunmaker's Hall at Friendship, IN

The NMLRA is based in Friendship, Indiana, approximately forty miles from Cincinnati, Ohio. The area is a combination of both modern and primitive facilities reflecting the diverse nature of the Association and the diverse sport of muzzleloading.

On site at Friendship, the NMLRA has The Museum of the National Muzzle Loading Rifle Association as well as Gunmakers Hall, where the works of contemporary gunmakers are displayed. The Museum is located within the historic structure known as The John Linsey Rand House.

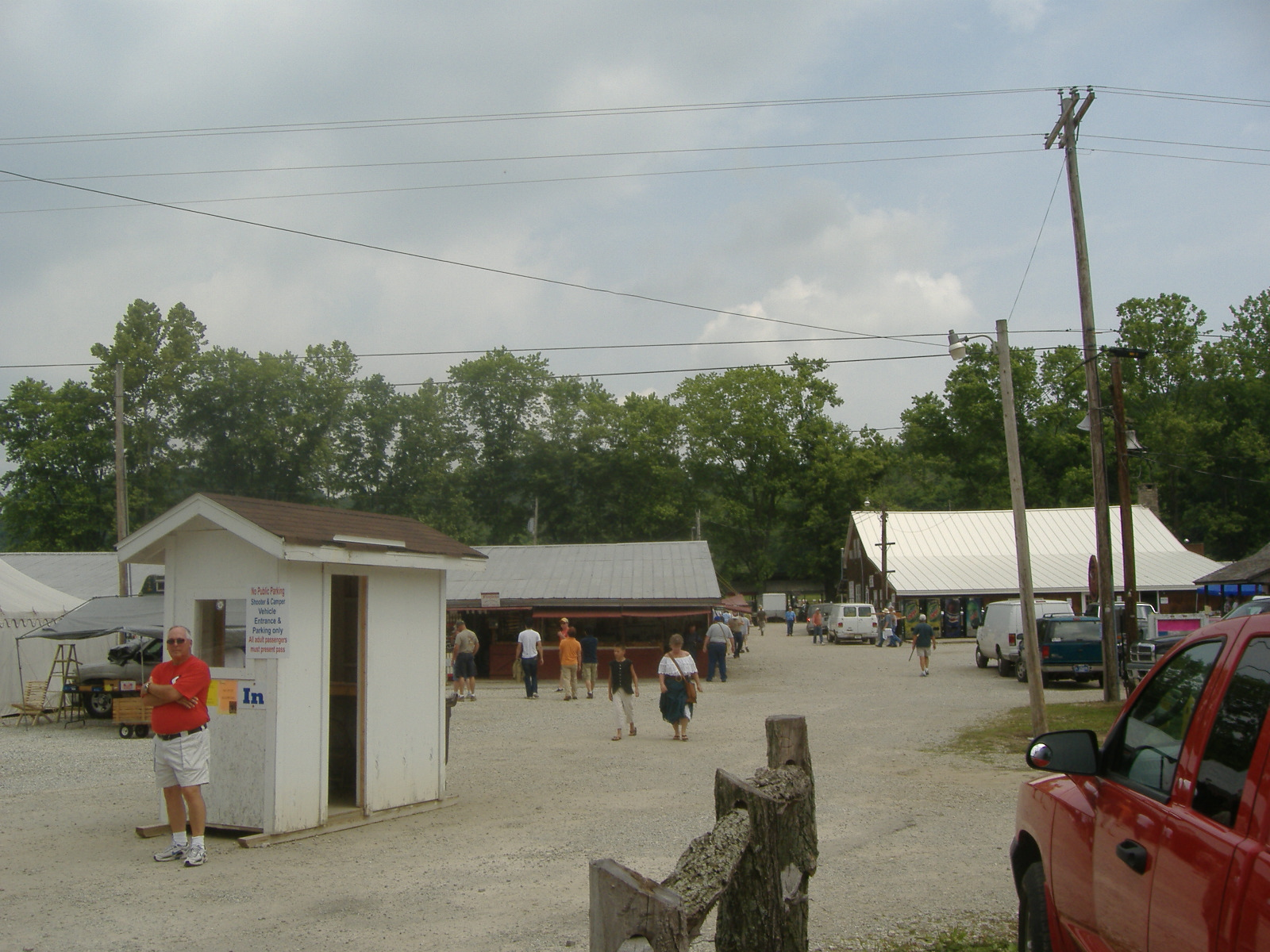
Walter Cline Gun Range

There are multiple shooting ranges on site varying from the Curly Gostomski Primitive Range to the Walter Cline Modern Range covering all disciplines of muzzleloading shooting as well as primitive archery knife and tomahawk throwing. During national shoots, and other events, the site also hosts vendors in Commercial Row where some of today's most skilled muzzleloading industry craftsmen set up to sell their wares covering all aspects of muzzleloading.

The site also includes camping areas; Frontier Heritage is a 50 site full hookup area that includes electric, water and sewer connections. Additional campsites range from electric only connections for modern campers and tents and a primitive area for canvas tents, tipis, and marquis of the era. Leashed, well-behaving pets and service animals are allowed at the site.

== National shoots ==
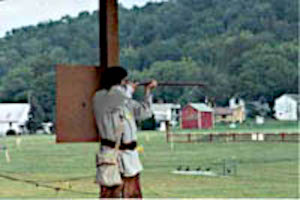
A shooter at the Walter Cline Range

The NMLRA holds two national shooting competitions at the Walter Cline Range at Friendship: the annual Spring National Shoot held in mid-June and the National Championship Shoot held in mid-September. Registration for these events is on the NMLRA website.

According to the NMLRA website, "During the two major events shooters from around the world compete for national record scores. There are competitions for muzzleloading rifle, pistol, shotgun, musket, bench and slug guns, as well as tomahawk and knife throwing."

Multiple events are also held at Friendship throughout the year including Black Powder Cartridge matches, the NRA National Muzzleloading Championship Shoot, a Youth Shoot, a Family Shoot, a Turkey Shoot, National Women's Weekend Shoot, 22 precision events, and modern centerfire long range events.

== National rendezvous ==
The NMLRA was responsible for creating a number of National Regional Primitive Rendezvous, or historical reenactments of the North American fur trade, during the late 1970s and early-to-mid-1980s. These rendezvous spanned the entire breadth of the continental United States. These rendezvous were managed directly by the Association through the year 1998.

However, in late 1998 the NMLRA decided to discontinue their direct control of these national rendezvous as they no longer believed them to be profitable. They created the National Rendezvous and Living History Foundation to manage the rendezvous. While the NMLRA technically still continues to sponsor the national rendezvous, the NRLHF currently runs and manages those events that remained affiliated with the Association after its 1998 decision. Those rendezvous are the Eastern Regional Rendezvous, the Northeastern Regional Rendezvous, the Southeastern Regional Rendezvous, the Old Northwest Territory Regional Rendezvous, and the Midwest Regional Rendezvous.

== Other activities and programs ==
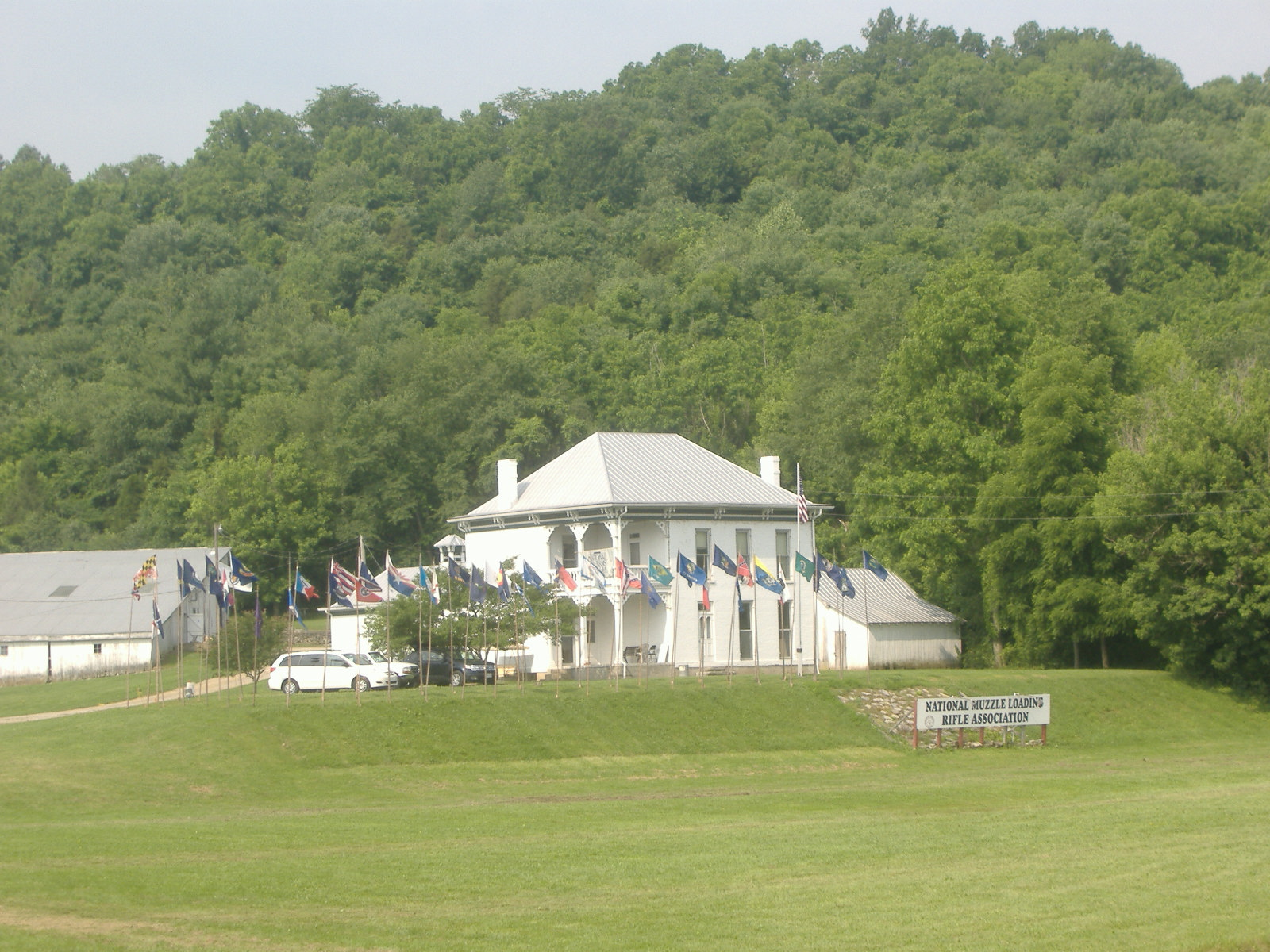
John Linsey Rand House/NMLRA Museum

The NMLRA has actively lobbied the United States Congress against any regulation of black power, only accepting a 5-pound limit for expediency, and demanding "unlimited distribution" of their supplies.

The NMLRA also sponsors an activity known as The Longhunter. The Longhunter program is designed to encourage the sport of muzzleloading while hunting large game due to the challenges and thrills such activity entails. It is associated with the Big Game Records Program which is the only trophy recognition program strictly for the muzzleloading hunter.

The NMLRA is currently restoring the Rand House, a historic structure located on the grounds at Friendship and home to the NMLRA Museum.

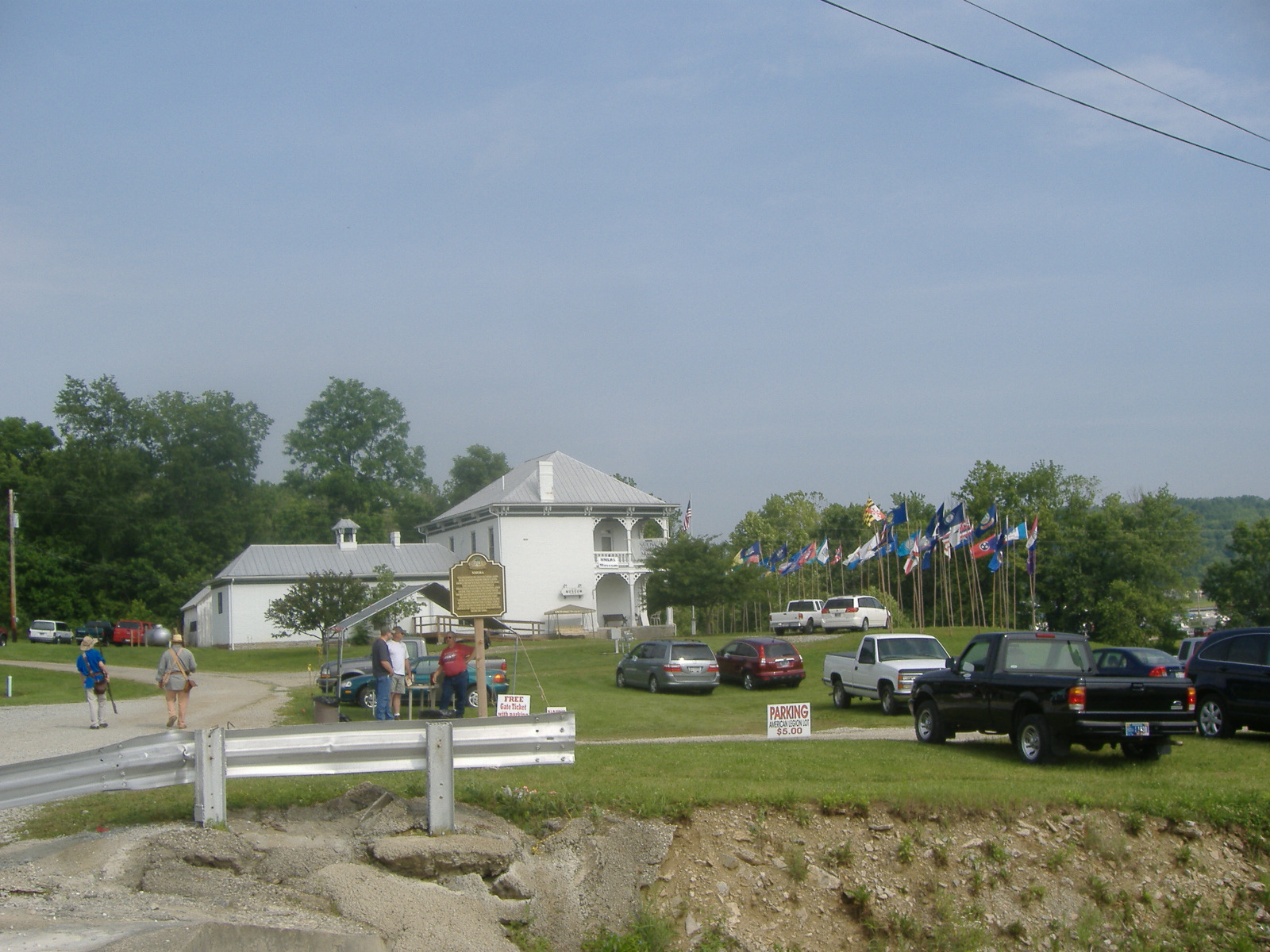
John Linsey Rand House/NMLRA Museum, side view

The NMLRA also has a college scholarship program. They offer scholarships to members or dependents of members in good-standing with the NMLRA. The awarding of the scholarships is based on a number of factors including academic performance in high school, as well as the financial need of the applicant.

== See also ==
- National Rendezvous and Living History Foundation
- Statue of Hope - Wilson Memorial (original NMLRA headquarters landowner), Friendship, Indiana
