= National Rendezvous and Living History Foundation =

The NRLHF logo

The National Rendezvous and Living History Foundation (NRLHF) is a 501(c)(3) non-profit organization which holds rendezvous across the United States for the period between 1640 and 1840 AD, or roughly during the heyday of the North American fur trade. Its unofficial motto, according to its website is, "Formed for the management of the rendezvous program by rendezvous people."

== Formation ==
The NRLHF was formed by the National Muzzle Loading Rifle Association in December 1998 and incorporated in March 1999. Its Articles of Incorporation can be found here: NRLHF Articles of Incorporation. The reason behind the Foundation's formation was to put the management of the National Muzzle Loading Rifle Association's various regional rendezvous in the hands of those who attended the events.

== Political structure ==
The overarching guidelines that the Foundation adheres to are outlined in their Constitution and By-Laws. The By-Laws can be found here: NRLHF By Laws.

The NRLHF is a democratic organization at its core. Each of the regional rendezvous managed by the Foundation elects a number of delegates to represent them on the Council of Delegates. The Council of Delegates contains eleven elected delegates and two appointed representatives from the parent organization: the NMLRA.

The NRLHF's Board of Directors is composed of eight individuals: four officers (President, Vice-President, Secretary, and Treasurer) and four directors. Each of the officers is a delegate elected from the Council of Delegates. Each of the directors was appointed by the parent organization, the NMLRA. The four officers are elected to their position by the Council of Delegates every year during the annual board meeting at the Eastern Primitive Rendezvous.

== The rendezvous ==
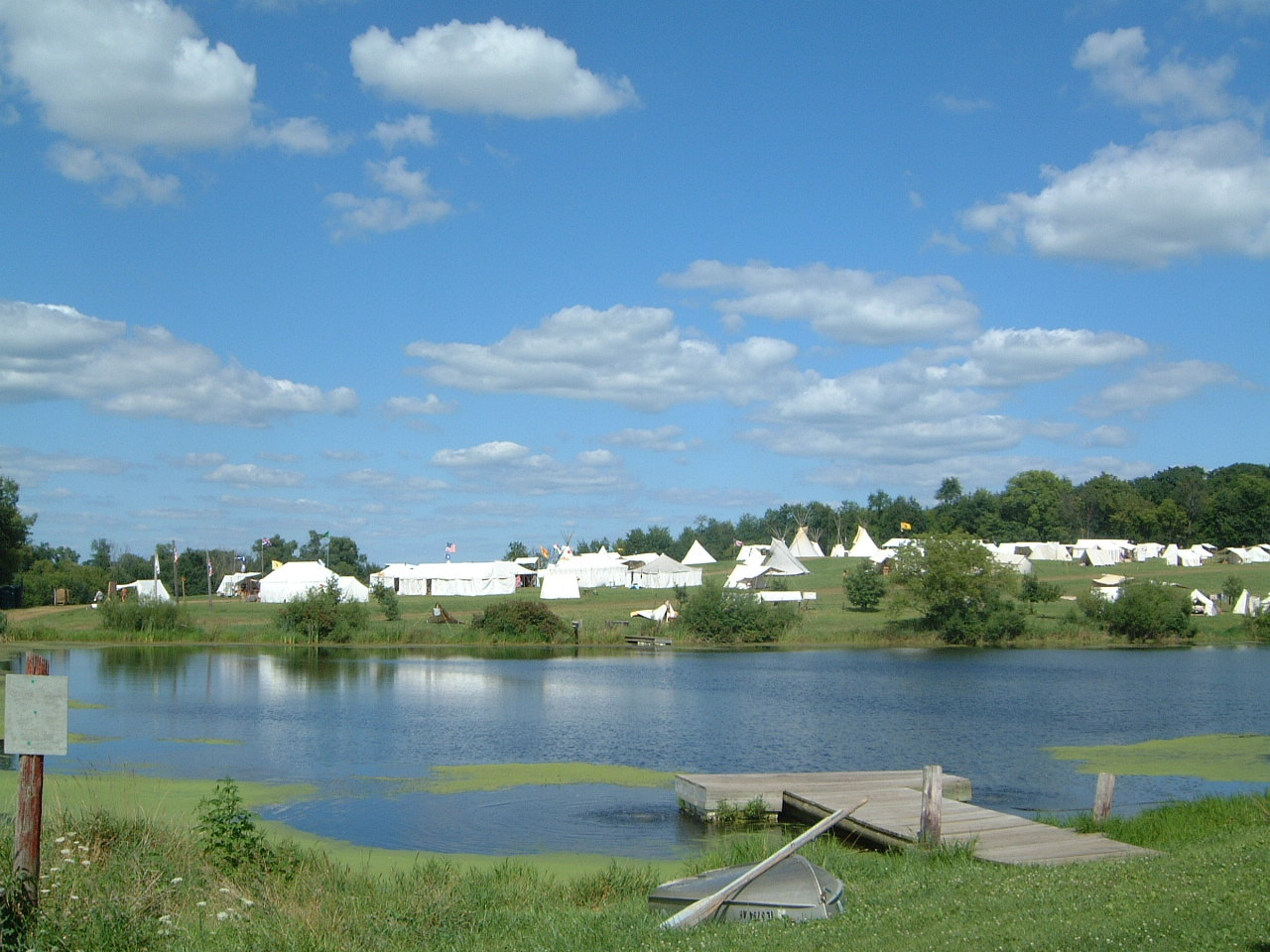
The Midwestern Primitive Rendezvous, 2004

Currently, the NRLHF manages five-week-long regional primitive rendezvous and one specialized weekend event. All of these events must follow the rules and regulations of the Foundation set forth by the Board of Directors. These rules and regulations can be found here: NRLHF Rules and Regulations. Traders or sutlers also have specific rules and regulations to follow. These rules and regulations can be found here: NRLHF Trade Rules and Regulations.

The Regional Rendezvous are:

- The Eastern Primitive Rendezvous: The Eastern Primitive Rendezvous was first held during America's bicentennial year, 1976. The states in this region include Pennsylvania, West Virginia, Virginia, Maryland, Delaware, and New Jersey. This event has long been known as one of the, if not the, largest Rendezvous in the United States. It is traditionally held during the last week of September. This rendezvous currently elects three delegates to serve on the NRLHF's Council of Delegates. This rendezvous also holds the annual NRLHF Board of Directors meeting.
- The Northeastern Primitive Rendezvous: The states in this region include New York, Connecticut, Rhode Island, Massachusetts, Vermont, New Hampshire, Maine. It is traditionally held during a week in July. This rendezvous currently elects two delegates to serve on the NRLHF's Council of Delegates.
- The Southeastern Primitive Rendezvous: The states in this region include North Carolina, South Carolina, Georgia, Florida, Alabama, Mississippi, and Tennessee. It is traditionally held during a week in April. This rendezvous currently elects two delegates to serve on the NRLHF's Council of Delegates.
- The Old Northwest Territory Primitive Rendezvous: The Old Northwest Territory Primitive Rendezvous was first held during the year 1986. The states in this region include Kentucky, Ohio, Indiana, and lower Michigan. It is traditionally held during the last week of June. This rendezvous currently elects two delegates to serve on the NRLHF's Council of Delegates.
- The Midwest Primitive Rendezvous: The Midwest Primitive Rendezvous was first held during the year 1980. The states in this region include Illinois, Missouri, Iowa, Minnesota, Wisconsin, and upper Michigan. This event has not had a traditional date set during the summer for some time. This rendezvous currently elects two delegates to serve on the NRLHF's Council of Delegates.

Other foundation events include:

- The Corps of Discovery Rendezvous: The Corps of Discovery Rendezvous was first held during the year 2005. It is located in the state of Pennsylvania. It is traditionally held during a weekend in the month of May. The event focuses on the period between 1800 and 1803 AD, or, the period of the Lewis and Clark Expedition. This event elects no delegates to serve on the Council of Delegates

== See also ==
- National Muzzle Loading Rifle Association
- Historical reenactment
