= Statue of Hope =

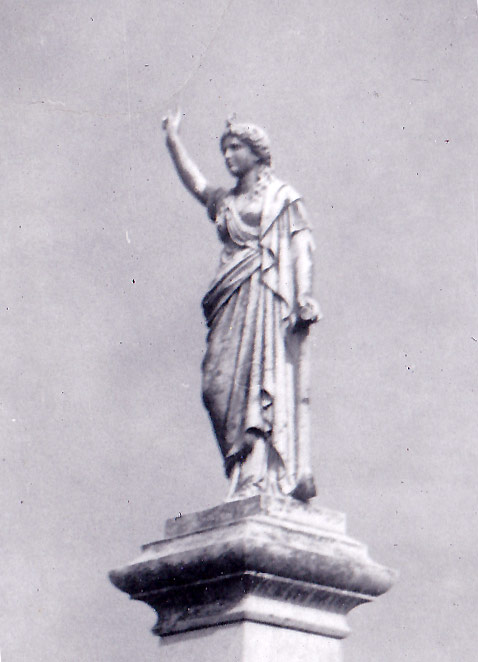
Statue of Hope Monument, Friendship, Indiana, US

A Statue of Hope is an allegorical figure that is typically a private memorial or monument displayed in a graveyard or cemetery. Hope is one of the Seven Virtues of the Christian religion.

== History ==
Most commonly used in the Victorian era and believed to be popularized by the Statue of Liberty's dedication in 1886. Prior to this, other images such as Saint Philomena whose authorization of devotion began in 1837 and Danish sculptor Bertel Thorvaldsen's Goddess of Hope statue sculpted in 1817, displayed similar characteristics.

One of the earliest signed Statue of Hope memorials was carved by Odoardo Fantacchiotti in 1863 for the grave of Samuel Reginald Routh of England in the Protestant Cemetery of Florence, Italy. Another variation was completed in 1791. The Custom House, Dublin Ireland features a 16 foot (about 5 meter) tall statue of a female resting on an anchor atop the dome. This statue has been called both the Statue of Hope and the Statue of Commerce.

== Construction ==
In the United States, these statues were commonly carved out of limestone or marble and were usually unsigned. The Wilson memorial pictured on the right was sculpted using Indiana Limestone which was quarried nearby. Towards the latter part of the 19th and early 20th century, some were cast with zinc, commonly referred to as White Bronze.

== Religious symbolism ==
A female, typically shown wearing Roman Stola and Palla garments, stands with one arm resting on or holding an anchor. This is often an Anchored cross meaning hope and is the primary symbol of the statue. Further, the New Testament, Hebrews 6:19 states Which hope we have as an anchor of the soul, both sure and steadfast, and which entereth into that within the veil. Often, the opposite arm is raised with the index finger of the hand pointing towards the sky. This symbolizes the pathway to heaven. A hand held over the heart symbolizes faith. Other key elements can be a broken chain attached to the anchor or sometimes hanging from the neck. This symbolizes the cessation of life. Many statues have a single five pointed star rather than a circle of stars. The star is on the top of the forehead, usually on a Crown of Immortality or diadem, and represents the immortal soul.

== See also ==
- Sculpture
- Stone sculpture
- Stone carving
