= Terzerol =

17th–19th century pocket pistol

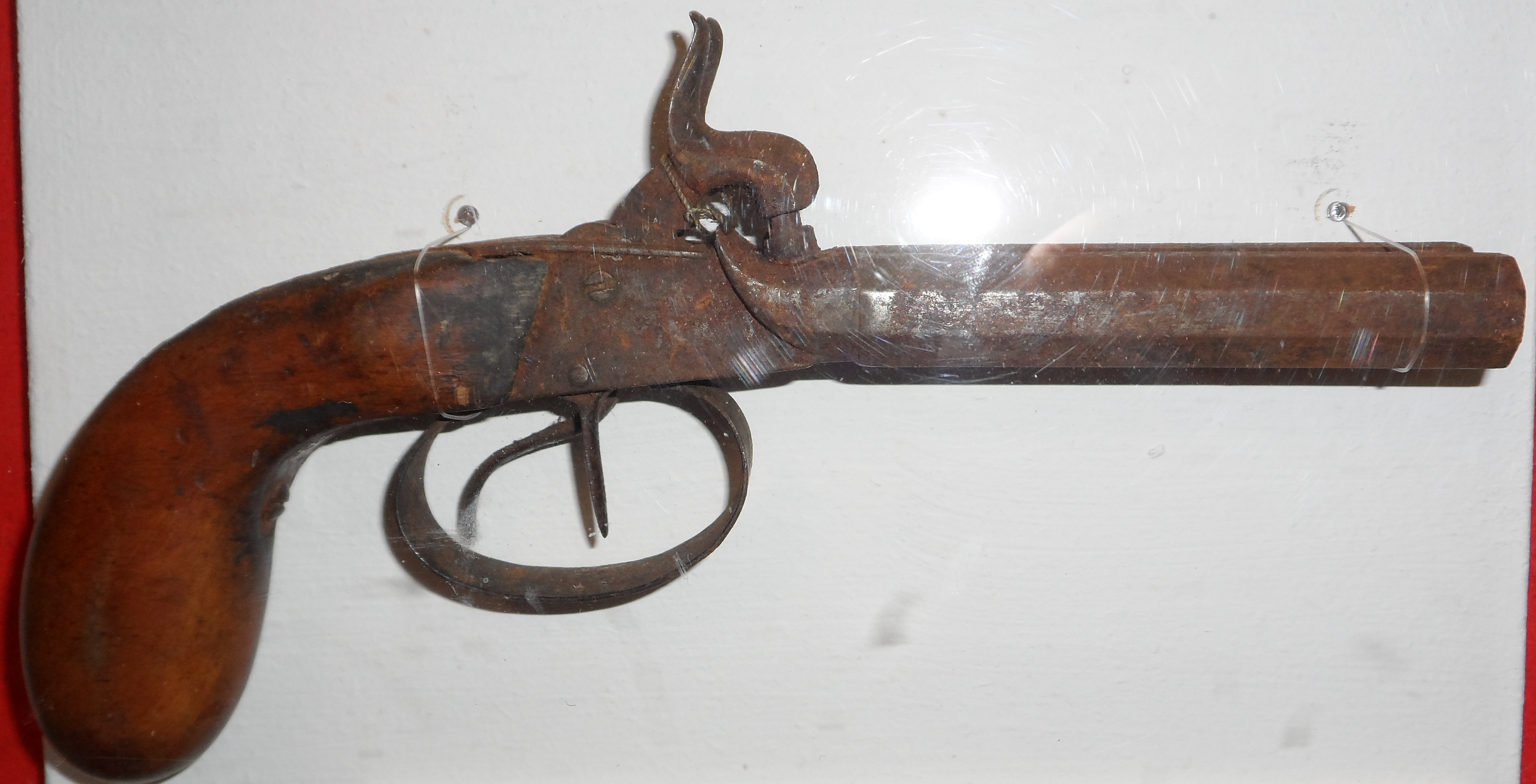

The Terzerol (or terzerole) was a small muzzle-loading pistol with one or two barrels, thus capable of either one or two shots. These firearms were used from the 17th century onward, first as flintlocks, and in the 19th century with percussion caps.

Due to its size, the weapon was also called a "pocket pistol" or "lady's pistol", in contrast with the more common large handguns of the era. The term terzerol is derived from the Italian terzuolo, meaning a hunting hawk.
