= Cross Plains, Indiana =

- Unincorporated community and Census-designated place
- Location within Indiana Location within the United States
- Coordinates: 38°56′38″N 85°12′17″W
- Country: United States
- State: Indiana
- County: Ripley
- Township: Brown
- Elevation: 961 ft (293 m)
- Time zone: UTC-5 (Eastern (EST))
  - Summer (DST): UTC-4 (EDT)
- ZIP code: 47017
- Area codes: 812, 930
- FIPS code: 18-16030
- GNIS feature ID: 2830511

Cross Plains is an unincorporated community in Brown Township, Ripley County, in the U.S. state of Indiana.

== History ==
Cross Plains was founded in 1826 and was named for the fact two roads meet at the town site. A post office has been in operation at Cross Plains since 1826.

== Demographics ==
The United States Census Bureau delineated Cross Plains as a census designated place in the 2022 American Community Survey.
