= Southeastern Indiana Conference =

The Southeastern Indiana Conference was an IHSAA-sanctioned conference that existed from 1930 to 1958.

== History ==
The conference was formed in the fall of 1930 with charter members Aurora, Austin, Batesville, Brookville, Brownstown, Corydon, French Lick, Madison, North Vernon, Oolitic, Orleans, Osgood, Paoli, Salem, Scottsburg, and Versailles. Invitations were also made to Edinburgh, Jeffersonville, Milroy, Mitchell, New Albany, Seymour, and West Baden, but they were apparently rejected. To balance out the East and West divisions, the league took in Lawrenceburg, Milan, Rising Sun, and Vevay. This put both divisions at 10 members each. French Lick and Oolitic left in 1939 to help found the Southwestern Indiana Conference, while Brookville did the same a year later to form the Whitewater Valley Conference. Rising Sun also left, helping form the Laughery Valley Conference in 1941. Milan was expelled in 1942 for rules violations. Mitchell joined in 1950.

The conference began to fracture in the 1950s. Osgood and Versailles would split off to form the Ohio River Valley Conference in 1952 (along with former members Milan and Rising Sun), with Vevay following the next year. The next wave came in 1956, as Aurora, Batesville, and Lawrenceburg left to create the Eastern Indiana Athletic Conference. Seven of the ten remaining schools would form the Mid-Southern Conference two years later, ending the conference. Orleans was able to land in the Southern Monon Conference, but Madison and North Vernon would have to survive as independents. Today, in addition to the EIAC, MSC, and ORVC, former SEIC members also compete in the Hoosier Hills and Patoka Lake conferences.

== Membership ==
School	Location	Mascot	Colors	County	Year joined	Previous conference	Year left	Conference joined
Aurora	Aurora	Red Devils		15; Dearborn	1930	Dearborn County	1956	Eastern Indiana
Austin	Austin	Eagles		72; Scott	1930		1958	Mid-Southern
Batesville	Batesville	Bulldogs		69; Ripley	1930	Ripley County	1956	Eastern Indiana
Brookville^{1}	Brookville	Greyhounds		24; Franklin	1930	Franklin County	1940	Whitewater Valley
Brownstown	Brownstown	Bears		36; Jackson	1930	Jackson County	1958	Mid-Southern
Corydon Central^{2}	Corydon	Panthers		31; Harrison	1930		1958	Mid-Southern
French Lick	French Lick	Red Devils		59; Orange	1930		1939	Southwestern Indiana
Lawrenceburg	Lawrenceburg	Tigers		15; Dearborn	1930	Dearborn County	1956	Eastern Indiana
Madison	Madison	Cubs		39; Jefferson	1930		1958	Independents (HHC 1973)
Milan	Milan	Indians		69; Ripley	1930	Ripley County	1942	Independents (ORVC 1952)
North Vernon	North Vernon	Panthers		40; Jennings	1930		1958	Independents (EIAC 1962)
Oolitic	Oolitic	Bearcats		47; Lawrence	1930		1939	Southwestern Indiana
Orleans	Orleans	Bulldogs		59; Orange	1930		1958	Southern Monon
Osgood	Osgood	Cowboys		69; Ripley	1930	Ripley County	1952	Ohio River Valley
Paoli	Paoli	Rams		59; Orange	1930		1958	Mid-Southern
Rising Sun	Rising Sun	Shiners		58; Ohio	1930		1941	Laughery Valley
Salem	Salem	Lions		88; Washington	1930		1958	Mid-Southern
Scottsburg	Scottsburg	Warriors		72; Scott	1930		1958	Mid-Southern
Versailles	Versailles	Lions		69; Ripley	1930	Ripley County	1952	Ohio River Valley
Vevay	Vevay	Warriors		78; Switzerland	1930		1953	Ohio River Valley
Mitchell	Mitchell	Bluejackets		47; Lawrence	1950		1958	Mid-Southern

1. Played concurrently in SEIC and FCC 1930–40.
2. School was Corydon until 1950. Played concurrently in SEIC and HCC 1930–58.

== Divisions ==
The SEIC used an East-West division format from its inception until the 1953–54 school year, when the conference was reduced to 13 teams. Madison often ended up moving between the two divisions, though after the ORVC schools left, both Madison and Scottsburg ended up in the Eastern Division.

1931–39		1939–40		1940–41		1941–42		1942–1950		1950–52		1952–53	
East	West	East	West	East	West	East	West	East	West	East	West	East	West
Aurora	Austin	Aurora	Austin	Aurora	Austin	Aurora	Austin	Aurora	Austin	Aurora	Austin	Aurora	Austin
Batesville	Brownstown	Batesville	Brownstown	Batesville	Brownstown	Batesville	Brownstown	Batesville	Brownstown	Batesville	Brownstown	Batesville	Brownstown
Brookville	Corydon	Brookville	Corydon	Lawrenceburg	Corydon	Lawrenceburg	Corydon	Lawrenceburg	Corydon	Lawrenceburg	Corydon	Lawrenceburg	Corydon
Lawrenceburg	French Lick	Lawrenceburg	Madison	Milan	Madison	Milan	Madison	Madison	Orleans	Madison	Mitchell	Madison	Mitchell
Milan	Madison	Milan	North Vernon	North Vernon	Orleans	North Vernon	Orleans	North Vernon	Paoli	North Vernon	Orleans	North Vernon	Orleans
North Vernon	Oolitic	Osgood	Orleans	Osgood	Paoli	Osgood	Paoli	Osgood	Salem	Osgood	Paoli	Scottsburg	Paoli
Osgood	Orleans	Rising Sun	Paoli	Rising Sun	Salem	Versailles	Salem	Versailles	Scottsburg	Versailles	Salem	Vevay	Salem
Rising Sun	Paoli	Versailles	Salem	Versailles	Scottsburg	Vevay	Scottsburg	Vevay		Vevay	Scottsburg		
Versailles	Salem	Vevay	Scottsburg	Vevay									
Vevay	Scottsburg												
