= Tri-County Conference (Southern Indiana) =

The Tri-County Conference (not to be confused with the conference of the same name located in the northern or western portions of the state) was located in Jefferson, Jennings, and Ripley counties in the southeastern part of Indiana. Originally the Jennings County Conference, when the Laughery Valley Conference was formed, it left Ripley County without enough schools to continue their county league, and the remaining schools were absorbed into the rebranded Jennings-Ripley County Conference in 1941. With many smaller schools in the area continuing to be consolidated into their slightly larger neighbors, both the JRCC and Jefferson County Conference continued to shrink in size. When one JCC school left to join the Ohio River Valley Conference in 1952, the remaining JCC schools joined with the JRCC under the Tri-County moniker. Consolidation and defections to other conferences continued to plague the league, with all of the Jennings County schools gone by 1961. The conference struggled on for five more years, until three of the remaining four schools in the league consolidated, leaving only Holton. Holton would continue as an independent for another three years, until being absorbed by South Ripley High School in 1969.

== Membership ==
School	Location	Mascot	Colors	County	Year joined	Previous conference	Year left	Conference joined
Brewersville	Brewersville	Hornets		40; Jennings	192?		1924	none (consolidated into North Vernon)
Butlerville	Butlerville	Bulldogs		40; Jennings	192?		1950	none (consolidated into North Vernon)
Hayden	Hayden	Haymakers		40; Jennings	192?		1961	none (consolidated into North Vernon)
Lovett	Lovett	Pirates		40; Jennings	192?		1939	none (consolidated into Paris Crossing)
Marion Township	Uniontown	Panthers		40; Jennings	192?		1940	none (consolidated into Paris Crossing)
Paris Crossing	Paris Crossing	Pirates^{1}		40; Jennings	192?		1961	none (consolidated into Vernon)
San Jacinto	San Jacinto	Bearcats		40; Jennings	192?		1940	none (consolidated into Hayden)
Scipio	Scipio	Tigers		40; Jennings	192?		1946	none (consolidated into North Vernon)
Vernon	Vernon	Blue Devils		40; Jennings	192?		1961	Dixie
Zenas	Zenas	Warriors		40; Jennings	192?		1948	none (consolidated into Vernon)
Holton	Holton	Warhorses		69; Ripley	1941	Ripley County	1966	Independents (consolidated into South Ripley 1969)
Napoleon	Napoleon	Bearcats		69; Ripley	1941	Ripley County	1960	none (consolidated into Jac-Cen-Del)
New Marion	New Marion	Panthers		69; Ripley	1941	Ripley County	1966	none (consolidated into South Ripley)
Central (Madison)	Madison	Wildcats		39; Jefferson	1952	Jefferson County	1966	none (consolidated into Madison)
Deputy	Deputy	Warriors		39; Jefferson	1952	Jefferson County	1961	Dixie
Dupont	Dupont	Hornets		39; Jefferson	1952	Jefferson County	1966	none (consolidated into Madison)
Saluda	Saluda	Bulldogs		39; Jefferson	1952	Jefferson County	1960	none (consolidated into Southwestern)
Cross Plains	Cross Plains	Wildcats		69; Ripley	1958	Laughery Valley	1966	none (consolidated into South Ripley)
Sunman	Sunman	Tigers		69; Ripley	1958	Laughery Valley	1964	Ohio River Valley

1. Lions before 1940.

== Resources ==
- Ripley County Basketball HOF Class of 2005
