= Laughery Valley Conference =

The Laughery Valley Conference was an IHSAA-sanctioned conference that existed between 1941 and 1958. The conference had its footprint in the Southeast Indiana counties of Dearborn, Ohio, Ripley, and Switzerland. The conference was stable for its first 11 years, but lost three schools to the Ohio River Valley Conference within two years. The LVC folded in 1958, as two of the five members at the time consolidated, and the two Ripley County schools left joined their counterparts in the Tri-County Conference. Patriot, unable to obtain membership in the ORVC or TCC, played as an independent until it consolidated into Switzerland County in 1968.

== Members ==
School	Location	Mascot	Colors	County	Year joined	Previous conference	Year left	Conference joined
Bright	Bright	Panthers		15; Dearborn	1941	Dearborn County	1958	none (consolidated into North Dearborn)
Cross Plains	Cross Plains	Wildcats		69; Ripley	1941	Ripley County	1958	Tri-County
Dillsboro	Dillsboro	Bulldogs		15; Dearborn	1941	Dearborn County	1953	Ohio River Valley
Guilford	Guilford	Wildcats		15; Dearborn	1941	Dearborn County	1958	none (consolidated into North Dearborn)
Moores Hill	Moores Hill	Bobcats		15; Dearborn	1941	Dearborn County	1953	Ohio River Valley
Rising Sun	Rising Sun	Shiners		58; Ohio	1941	Southeastern Indiana	1952	Ohio River Valley
Patriot	Patriot	Trojans		78; Switzerland	1941		1958	Independents (consolidated into Switzerland County 1968)
Sunman	Sunman	Tigers		69; Ripley	1941	Ripley County	1958	Tri-County
