= Ohio River Valley Conference =

High School Athletic Conference in Indiana

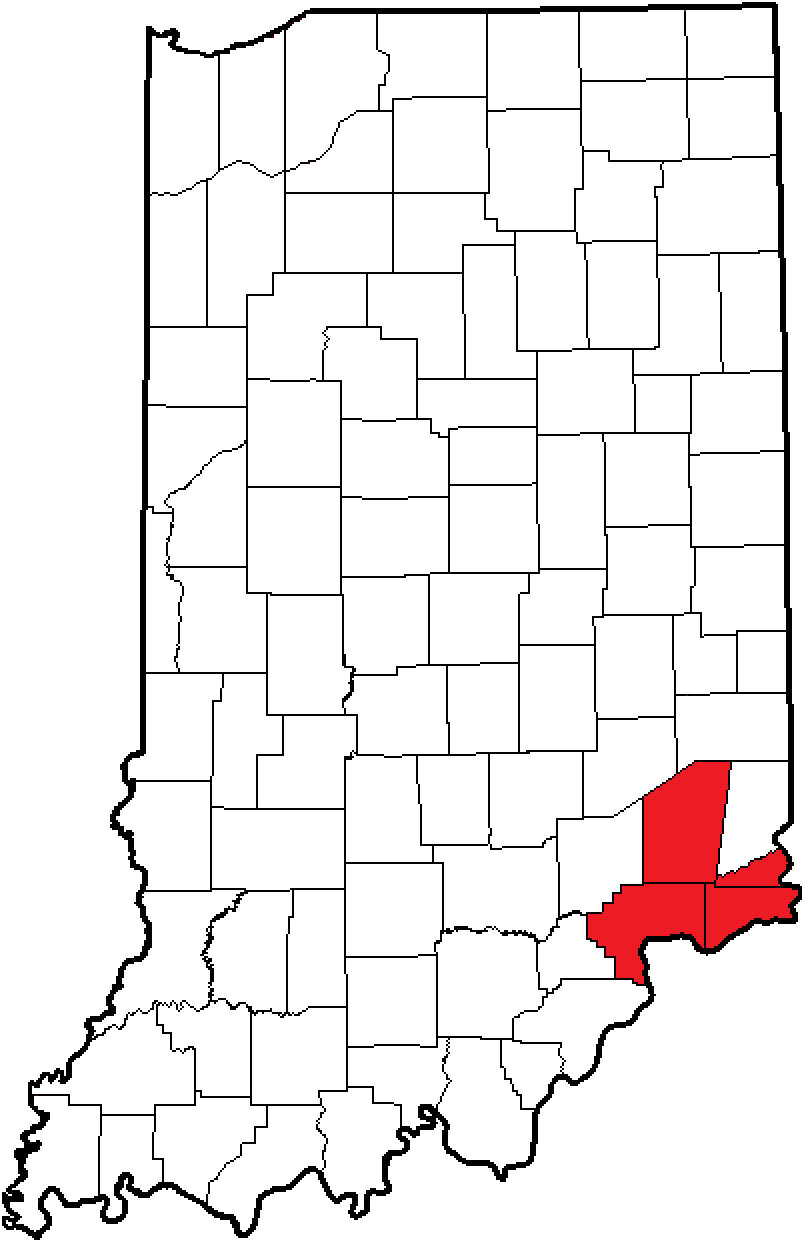
The Ohio Valley Conference in Indiana

The Ohio River Valley Conference is an Indiana High School Athletic Association-sanctioned conference located in Jefferson, Ohio, Ripley, and Switzerland counties. Formed in 1952, the conference has been fairly stable throughout its history, as five of the current seven members (or their precursors) are original members.

== History ==
The ORVC traces its history to two conferences, the Southeastern Indiana and Laughery Valley. When the league began, two of its members came from the SEIC (Osgood, Versailles), a third (Rising Sun) had been in the SEIC before helping found the LVC, and a fourth (Milan) was a SEIC member until being removed from the conference in 1942, remaining independent since that point. The first shakeup in conference membership came in the conference's second year, as North closed, and two more LVC schools (Dillsboro, Moores Hill) joined with one SEIC school (Vevay). Hanover and Osgood consolidated with other local schools to become Southwestern and Jac-Cen-Del in 1960, with both staying in the league. Milan, a school that had dominated 1950s basketball and had football, moved to the Eastern Indiana Athletic Conference in 1962. They were replaced by two schools: Shawe Memorial in 1962, and Sunman in 1964. Versailles became South Ripley in 1966, with Vevay changing to Switzerland County in 1969.

The 1970s were a different story, as the three member schools would not survive to the end of the decade. Sunman was consolidated with North Dearborn in 1973, forming East Central. Dillsboro and Moores Hill would follow suit in 1978, combining with Aurora to form South Dearborn. Both of those schools had pre-consolidation ties to the Eastern Indiana Athletic Conference, and would retain their places in that conference. Left as a six-school conference, the ORVC welcomed founding member Milan back in 1985, as the former basketball power was struggling to keep up with larger rivals in the post-consolidation era. The conference has been stable since, a two-year hiatus by Southwestern in the mid-1990s notwithstanding. That stability looks to continue into the future. Lawrenceburg was denied entry in the 1990s, and there is only one other school in the area (Oldenburg Academy) who is of a similar size.

== Membership ==
School	Location	Mascot	Colors	Size	IHSAA Class	County	Year joined	Previous conference
Jac-Cen-Del	Osgood	Eagles		296	A	69; Ripley	1960	none (new school)
Milan^{1}	Milan	Indians		417	AA	69; Ripley	1952; 1985	Independents; Eastern Indiana
Rising Sun	Rising Sun	Shiners		312	A	58; Ohio	1952	Laughery Valley
Shawe; Memorial	Madison	Hilltoppers		93	A	39; Jefferson	1962	Independents
South; Ripley	Versailles	Raiders		414	AA	69; Ripley	1966	none (new school)
Southwestern (Hanover)^{2}	Hanover	Rebels		462	AA	39; Jefferson	1960	none (new school)
Switzerland; County	Vevay	Pacers		410	AA	78; Switzerland	1968	none (new school)

1. Milan played in the Eastern Indiana Athletic Conference from 1962 to 1985.
2. Southwestern played as an Independent from 1994 to 1996 after being removed from the conference for rules violations.

== Former members ==
School	Location	Mascot	Colors	County	Year joined	Previous conference	Year left	Conference joined
Hanover	Hanover	Bulldogs		39; Jefferson	1952	Jefferson County	1960	none (consolidated into Southwestern)
North (Madison)	Madison	Tigers		39; Jefferson	1952	Jefferson County	1953	none (colsolidated into Madison)
Osgood	Osgood	Cowboys		69; Ripley	1952	Southeastern Indiana	1960	none (consolidated into Jac-Cen-Del)
Versailles	Versailles	Lions		69; Ripley	1952	Southeastern Indiana	1966	none (consolidated into South Ripley)
Dillsboro	Dillsboro	Bulldogs		15; Dearborn	1953	Laughery Valley	1978	none (consolidated into South Dearborn)
Moores Hill	Moores Hill	Bobcats		15; Dearborn	1953	Laughery Valley	1978	none (consolidated into South Dearborn)
Vevay	Vevay	Warriors		78; Switzerland	1953	Southeastern Indiana	1968	none (consolidated into Switzerland County)
Sunman	Sunman	Tigers		69; Ripley	1964	Tri-County	1973	none (consolidated into East Central)

== Conference championships ==
=== Boys basketball ===
#	Team	Seasons
20	South Ripley	1970, 1977, 1978*, 1981, 1982*, 1984*, 1986, 1987*, 1995*, 1996, 2002, 2004*, 2005, 2010, 2012*, 2013, 2015, 2016, 2017*,2021
15	Jac-Cen-Del	1971, 1984*, 1985, 1992, 1993, 1994*, 1997, 1998, 1999, 2007, 2008*, 2009, 2011*,2022,2023
13	Southwestern	1968, 1969, 1972, 1973, 1974, 1976, 1979, 1987*, 1994*, 2000*, 2018, 2019,2020
8	Milan	1954, 1955, 1956, 2000*, 2001, 2003, 2004*, 2012*
5	Switzerland County	1982*, 1995*, 2008*, 2014, 2017*
4	Rising Sun	1957, 1988, 1989, 1991
4	Shawe Memorial	1962*, 1987*, 2006, 2011*
3	Sunman	1965, 1966*, 1967
3	Versailles	1959, 1960, 1963
1	Vevay	1966*
0	Dillsboro	
0	Hanover	
0	Madison North	
0	Moores Hill	
0	Osgood	

- Champions for 1952–53, 1957–58, 1960–61, 1963–64, 1974–75, 1979–80, 1982–83, and 1989–90 are unverified.

=== Girls basketball ===
#	Team	Seasons
11	South Ripley	1981, 1985, 1991, 1993, 2000, 2004, 2005*, 2011, 2012, 2013, 2017
8	Jac-Cen-Del	1976, 2006*, 2007, 2010, 2014*, 2015, 2016, 2018
7	Southwestern	1984, 2001, 2002, 2005*, 2006*, 2008, 2009
6	Switzerland County	1983, 1988, 1997, 2003, 2006*, 2014*
0	Dillsboro	
0	Milan	
0	Moores Hill	
0	Rising Sun	
0	Shawe Memorial	1994

- Girls champions from 1976-77 until 1998-99 are unverified (except for 1983–84, South Ripley, and Switzerland County titles).

=== Boys Soccer ===
#	Team	Seasons
5	Jac-Cen-Del	2013, 2015, 2017, 2019, 2020
5	Rising Sun	2004, 2014, 2016, 2018,
2	South Ripley	2009, 2010
1	Southwestern	2011
1	Switzerland County	2022

=== Girls Soccer ===
#	Team	Seasons
4	Switzerland County	2019, 2020, 2021, 2022
3	Milan	2017*, 2018, 2020*
2	Rising Sun	2016, 2017*
1	South Ripley	2015
1	Southwestern	2017*

- Girls conference champions not officially recognized until 2015

== State championships ==
=== Jac-Cen-Del (2) ===
- 2009 Boys Basketball (A)
- 2016 Girls Basketball (A)

=== Milan (1) ===
- 1954 Boys Basketball

=== Southwestern (Hanover) (1) ===
- 2002 Girls Basketball (2A)

=== Rising Sun (0) ===
- 2000 Girls Basketball (2A) Runner-Up

== Resources ==
- IHSAA Conferences
- IHSAA Directory
