= Batesville High School =

Batesville High School may refer to:

- Batesville High School (Arkansas), Batesville, Arkansas
- Batesville High School (Indiana), Batesville, Indiana
