= Rising Sun High School =

Rising Sun High School may refer to:

- Rising Sun High School (Maryland), North East, Maryland
- Rising Sun High School (Indiana), Rising Sun, Indiana
