= Seymour High School (Indiana) =

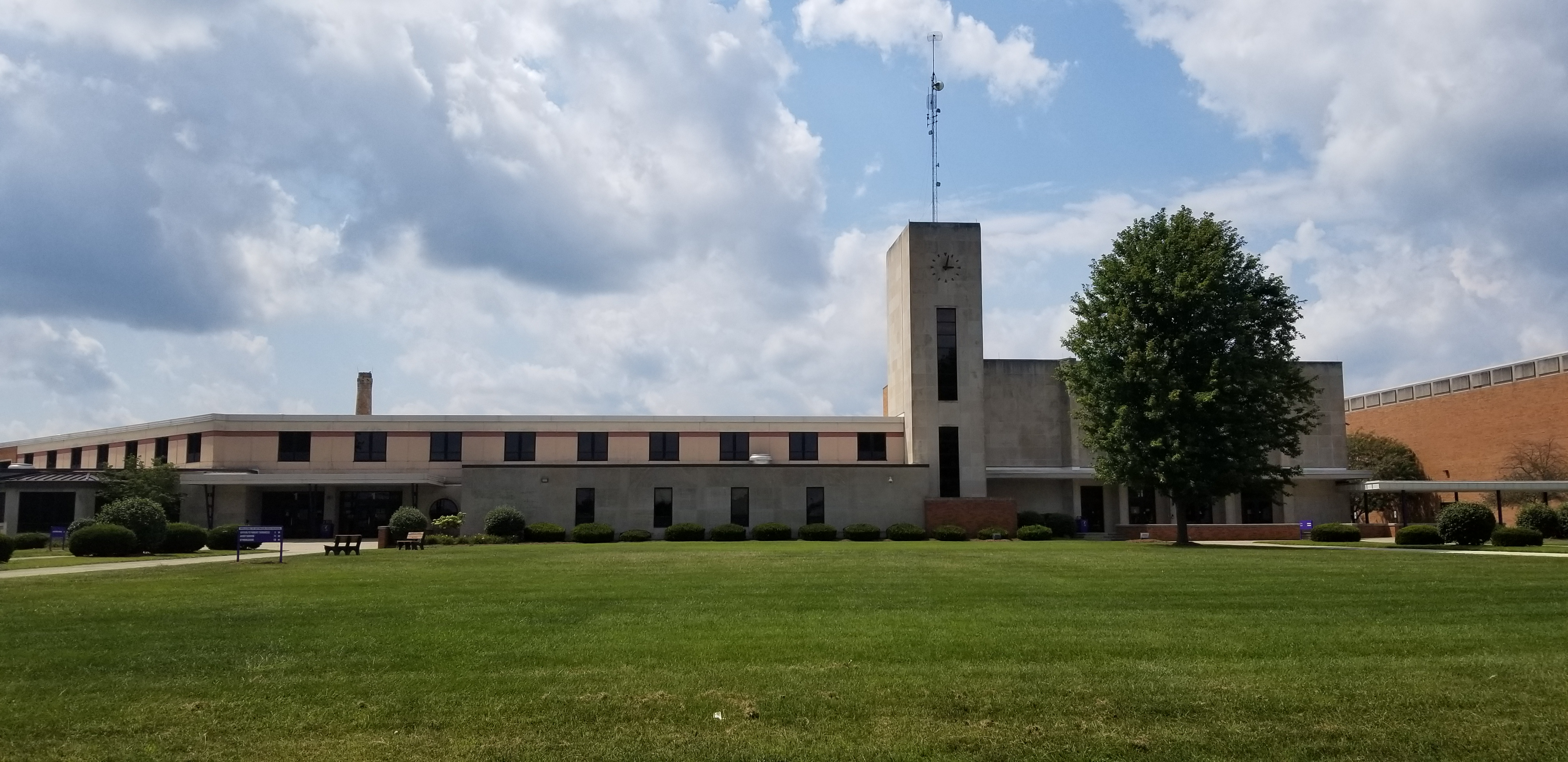

Location
- 1350 West 2nd Street; Seymour, Jackson County, Indiana 47274; United States; 38°57′19″N 85°54′25″W

Information
- Type: Public high school
- Established: 1870
- School district: Seymour Community Schools
- Superintendent: Brandon Harpe
- Principal: Steve Bush
- Teaching staff: 97.50 (FTE)
- Grades: 9-12
- Enrollment: 1,726 (2023–2024)
- Student to teacher ratio: 17.70
- Colors: dark purple; white
- Athletics conference: Hoosier Hills Conference
- Nickname: Owls
- Rival: Brownstown Central High School Columbus East High School Columbus North High School Columbus Central Middle School
- Website: Official Website

Seymour High School is a public high school in Seymour, Indiana. It is one of two high schools in the Seymour Community Schools district, with the other high school for Seymour students is Trinity Lutheran High School.

== History ==
Prior to 1870, an iron fence separated a tract of forest land from the growing town of Seymour. In that year the tree-covered plot was leased by the town school board and work began on a three-story brick building facing the east. The heirs of Captain Meedy Shields later gave this land to the city for school purposes.

Here stood the first Shields High School, surrounded by trees and for many years bordered on the west by a pond. On the first floor were two grade rooms and the public library; on the second, two grade rooms and the superintendent's office; and on the third, the music room and the assembly room.

In 1876 there had been an addition of six rooms, but the growing population of Seymour now demanded even more space if the supply of rooms was to meet the needs of the pupils. In 1911, a new school building arose on the foundations of the old. This building is the one which houses the Shields Junior High School today.

It was not long until sports and inter-school competition came into prominence. By 1922 students and citizens alike complained of the smallness of the Shields gymnasium, so in 1922 a south wing was added to the school. This contained an auditorium-gymnasium and above it six classrooms.

In the middle of the 1930s sports fans again began to clamor for a gymnasium big enough to house all the Owl supporters and in November 1937 a fire-proof structure with a capacity of 3308 was begun as a WPA project. The seating capacity was later expanded to 3800.

In September 1959, Shields High School was moved to completely new facilities on 61 acres (250,000 m^{2}) at the west edge of Seymour. The 9th grade remained, along with grades 7 and 8, in the Shields High School facilities and became known as the Shields Junior High School. In addition to classroom and laboratory facilities, the new two-story building contained the school's administrative ad guidance offices, a 110-seat library, an 1100-seat auditorium, and a 300-seat cafeteria. In 1960 the football stadium and an all-purpose track were added to the high school campus. In 1968 work began on a new gymnasium, indoor swimming pool, and a separate academic facility consisting of ten classrooms, two science labs, and two industrial arts labs. These new facilities were ready for occupancy in the fall of 1970, and at that time, ninth grade students again became part of the high school. The gymnasium, dedicated in 1970, seats 8,228 and ranks as the second largest high school gym in the United States. It was renamed in honor of Lloyd E. Scott in 1998, who coached the boys' basketball team from 1961 to 1974. A fourth building, the power heating plant, varsity and reserve baseball diamonds, and eight tennis courts are also located on campus.

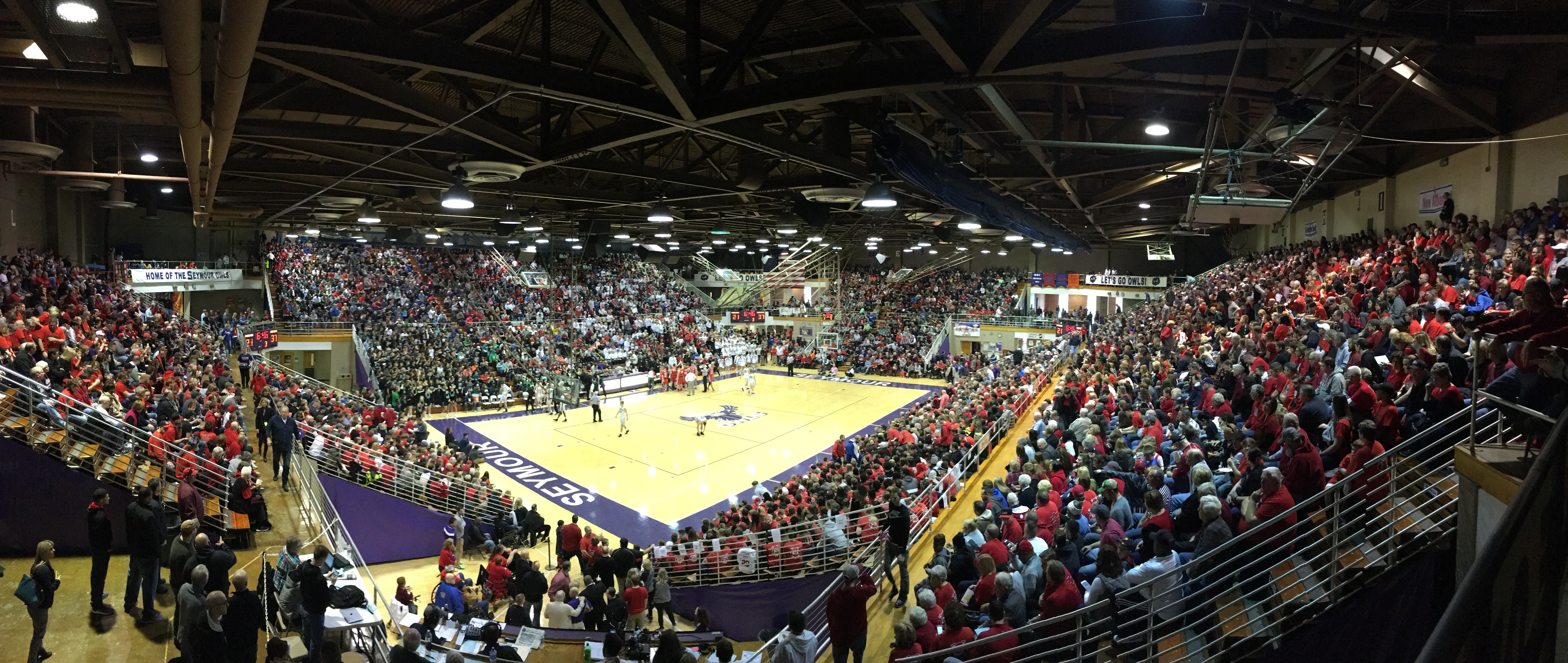
Lloyd E. Scott Gymnasium, the nation's second largest high school gym

In 1988, the library and business classrooms above the library were renovated and enlarged, and an additional computer lab was constructed for the business department. In 1992, the guidance and administrative offices were renovated and enlarged. In 1997 a two-year, $18 million renovation and building expansion project that included the construction of a new auxiliary gym, a new science wing, a hallway linkage between the original building and the 1968 building, and extensive remodeling of all classrooms, the cafeteria, and the Earl D. Prout was completed. In the spring of 2000 ground was broken on a major renovation of the stadium including the remodeling of locker rooms and the construction of a new weight and training room.

In 2007, the girls softball facility was completely remodeled including the construction of dugouts and an announcers' booth. An indoor multi-purpose athletic facility was also constructed adjacent to the varsity baseball field.

In 2011, due to a flood, the street in front of the Auditorium had to be removed and replaced.

In 2016, a new turf soccer field and stadium were built on the west side of the school grounds. A turf football field was also installed, replacing the natural grass that once supported the football stadium.

In 2022, construction began on an expansion and remodeling of the high school. The building's expansion included 30 classrooms, new band and choir rooms, and a new cafeteria. The previous cafeteria was remodeled into a new home economics hallway, and the previous band and choir rooms were made into a large group room. The construction was part of a larger Seymour Community Schools project, which also included construction on the Seymour Intermediate School and Ag Science Center. Construction on the high school was completed on August 12, 2024.

== Demographics ==
The demographic breakdown of the 1,239 students enrolled in 2012–2013 was:

- Male - 51.7%
- Female - 48.3%
- Native American/Alaskan - 0.2%
- Asian/Pacific islanders - 0.7%
- Black - 1.2%
- Hispanic - 2.3%
- White - 95.2%
- Multiracial - 0.4%

42.7% of the students were eligible for free or reduced lunch.

== Athletics ==
The Seymour Owls play in the Hoosier Hills Conference. The following IHSAA sports are offered:

- Baseball (boys)
  - State champion - 1988
- Basketball (boys & girls)
- Cross country (boys & girls)
- Football (boys)
- Golf (boys & girls)
  - Boys state champion - 1990
  - Girls state champion - 1989
- Gymnastics (girls)
- Soccer (boys & girls)
- Softball (girls)
- Swimming (boys & girls)
- Tennis (boys & girls)
- Track (boys & girls)
- Volleyball (girls)
- Wrestling (boys)

== Notable people ==
=== Faculty ===
- Bob Lochmueller – NBA player, head basketball coach 1957–1961

=== Alumni ===
- Pat Calhoun – Olympic swimmer
- Tim Durham – businessman
- Brian Fish – men's basketball head coach, Montana State
- Daniel M. Fleetwood – scientist and inventor
- Thomas M. Honan – Speaker of the Indiana House of Representatives and Indiana Attorney General
- John Mellencamp – musician
- Teri Moren – women's basketball head coach, Indiana University
- Katie Stam – Miss America 2009
- Mark Sciarra – professional wrestler, better known as "Rip Rogers"
- Rob Wiethoff – actor and voice actor best known for his portrayal of John Marston in the video games Red Dead Redemption and Red Dead Redemption 2
