= Pekin School District =

- Pekin Public School District 108, a grade school district in Tazewell County, Illinois
- Pekin Community High School District 303, a high school district in Tazewell County, Illinois
- East Washington School Corporation, a school district for all grades, based in Pekin, Washington County, Indiana
- Pekin Community School District, a school district for all grades, based in Jefferson County, Iowa
