= Connersville High School =

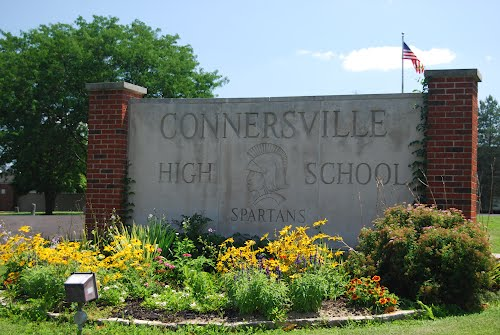

Location
- 100 Spartan Drive; Connersville, Indiana 47331; United States; 39°38′11″N 85°09′39″W

Information
- Type: Public high school
- Established: 1875
- School district: Fayette County School Corporation
- Principal: Trent Liggett
- Teaching staff: 58.00 (on an FTE basis)
- Grades: 9-12
- Enrollment: 930 (2023-2024)
- Student to teacher ratio: 16.03
- Color
- Athletics conference: Eastern Indiana Athletic Conference
- Nickname: Spartans
- Accreditation: AdvancED
- Website: chs.fayette.k12.in.us

Connersville High School is the only high school in Fayette County, Indiana. Connersville High School is located in Connersville, Indiana.

== Academics ==
Connersville High School has been accredited by AdvancED or its predecessors since April 1, 1908. The 2018 U.S. News & World Report annual high school ranking awarded Connersville a bronze rating.

== Demographics ==
The demographic breakdown of the 1,115 students enrolled in 2015-2016 was:

- Male - 50.8%
- Female - 49.2%
- Asian - 0.2%
- Black - 1.1%
- Hispanic - 1.1%
- White - 94.6%
- Multiracial - 3.0%

51.3% of the students were eligible for free or reduced-cost lunch. Connersville was a Title I school in 2015–2016.

== Athletics ==
The Connersville Spartans compete in the Eastern Indiana Athletic Conference. The school colors are red and white. The following Indiana High School Athletic Association (IHSAA) sanctioned sports are offered:

- Baseball (boys)
- Basketball (girls and boys)
  - Boys state champions - 1972, 1983
- Cross country (girls and boys)
- Football (boys)
- Golf (girls and boys)
- Gymnastics (girls)
  - State champions - 1987, 1988, 1989
- Soccer (girls and boys)
- Softball (girls)
- Swimming (girls and boys)
- Tennis (girls and boys)
- Track (girls and boys)
- Volleyball (girls)
- Wrestling

== Notable alumni ==
- Robert Wise – film director, producer and editor
- Scott Halberstadt – actor
- Matt Howard – professional basketball player

== See also ==
- List of high schools in Indiana
