= Eastern High School (Pekin, Indiana) =

Location
- 1100 N Eastern School Rd; Pekin, Washington County, Indiana 47165; United States; 38°30′52.82″N 86°0′6.82″W

Information
- Type: Public high school
- Motto: All for One, One for All
- Established: 1967; 59 years ago
- School district: East Washington School Corporation
- NCES School ID: 180300000395
- President: Tom Coats
- Principal: Darin Farris
- Teaching staff: 26.00 (FTE)
- Grades: 9-12
- Enrollment: 389 (2023-2024)
- Student to teacher ratio: 14.96
- Color
- Athletics: Basketball, baseball, cheerleading, cross country, football, golf, tennis, volleyball, wrestling, softball, track and field, trap shooting
- Athletics conference: Mid-Southern
- Team name: Musketeers
- Yearbook: The Commentator
- Assistant Principal: Andrew Lewellen
- Rival: Salem High School (Indiana)
- Website: Official website

Eastern High School is a public high school located in the small, rural town of Pekin, Indiana. As part of the East Washington School Corporation, it was built in 1967 and has gone under a number of changes in the last 30 years. The most recent change was in 2003 when the school built a new football stadium, added various classrooms, and built an auditorium, among a number of things.

== Athletics ==
Eastern High School's athletic teams are the Musketeers and they compete in the Mid-Southern Conference of Indiana. The Musketeers won the IHSAA state tournament in Girl's Basketball in 2017 and 2026. The school offers a wide range of athletics including:

- Baseball
- Basketball (Men's and Women's)
- Cheerleading
- Cross Country (Men's and Women's)
- Football
- Golf (Men's and Women's)
- Softball
- Tennis (Men's and Women's)
- Track (Men's and Women's)
- Volleyball
- Wrestling

== See also ==
- List of high schools in Indiana
