= Hoosier Hills Conference =

High School Athletic Conference in Indiana

A county-level map of current and former Hoosier Hills Conference member schools. Counties colored blue are the locations of former member schools, and counties colored red are the locations of current and future members.

The Hoosier Hills Conference is an eight-member, IHSAA-sanctioned athletic conference comprising large 4A,5A & 6A football-sized schools in Bartholomew, Clark, Floyd, Jackson, Jennings, Lawrence and Monroe in South Central and Southeast Indiana. Madison departed the conference in 2021, thereby reducing its size to seven member schools. Bloomington South joined in April 2026 thus bringing the membership back up to eight schools.

== Membership ==
School	Location	Mascot	Colors	Enrollment 26–27	IHSAA Class	IHSAA Class Football	County	Year joined	Previous conference
Bedford; N. Lawrence	Bedford	Stars		1,185	4A	4A	47; Lawrence	1974	none (new school)
Bloomington; South	Bloomington	Panthers		1,784	4A	5A	03; Monroe	2026	Conference Indiana
Columbus; East	Columbus	Olympians		1,278	4A	4A	03; Bartholomew	1972	none (new school)
Floyd; Central	Floyds Knobs	Highlanders		1,752	4A	5A	22; Floyd	1976	Mid-Southern
Jeffersonville	Jeffersonville	Red Devils		2,147	4A	6A	10; Clark	1979	South Central
Jennings; County^{1}	North Vernon	Panthers		1,159	3A	4A	40; Jennings	1972	Eastern Indiana
New; Albany	New Albany	Bulldogs		1,753	4A	5A	22; Floyd	1976	Southern Indiana
Seymour	Seymour	Owls		1,644	4A	5A	36; Jackson	1997	South Central

1. Played concurrently in HHC and EIAC 1972–73.

=== Former members ===
School	Location	Mascot	Colors	County	Year joined	Previous conference	Year left	Conference joined
Bedford^{1}	Bedford	Stonecutters		47; Lawrence	1972	Southern Indiana	1974	none (consolidated into Bedford-North Lawrence)
Bloomington North	Bloomington	Cougars		53; Monroe	1976	none (new school)	1983	South Central
Madison; Consolidated	Madison	Cubs		39; Jefferson	1972	Independents (SE IN 1958)	2020	Independents

1. Played concurrently in HHC and SIAC 1972–73.

== Conference championships ==
=== Football ===
#	Team	Seasons
27	Columbus East	1976, 1978, 1979, 1983, 1984*, 1986, 1989*, 1990*, 1994, 2004, 2005, 2006*, 2007, 2008, 2009, 2010, 2011, 2012, 2013, 2014, 2015, 2016, 2017, 2018, 2019, 2020, 2024, 2025
8	Jeffersonville	1982, 1987, 1988, 1990*, 1991, 1992, 1993, 1997
7	Bedford-N.L.	1975, 1976, 1980, 1981, 1995, 2006*, 2022*
7	Floyd Central	1989*, 1990*, 1996, 1998, 2003, 2023
4	New Albany	1984*, 1985, 2002, 2021
4	Seymour	1999, 2000, 2001, 2022*
2	Madison	1973*, 1989*
1	Bedford	1973*
1	Bloomington North	1977
1	Jennings County	1974

=== Boys basketball ===
#	Team	Seasons
18	New Albany	1978, 1980, 1982, 1992, 1994, 2001, 2002, 2004, 2005, 2007, 2008, 2009, 2010, 2014, 2015, 2016, 2017, 2021
13	Bedford-N.L.	1981, 1985, 1987, 1988, 1989*, 1990, 1991, 1995, 1998*, 1999*, 2000, 2011, 2023*
13	Jeffersonville	1983, 1984, 1993, 1996, 1999*, 2000*, 2006, 2012, 2013, 2019*, 2020, 2021, 2023*, 2025
5	Columbus East	1974, 1976, 1977, 1979, 2003
5	Floyd Central	1986, 1989*, 2018, 2019*, 2022
4	Jennings County	1975, 1997, 1998*, 2023*
2	Madison	1973, 1998*
1	Seymour	2024
0	Bloomington North	
0	Bedford	

=== Girls basketball ===
#	Team	Seasons
16	Jeffersonville	1981, 1983, 1984, 1988, 1997, 1998, 2003, 2004, 2005*, 2007*, 2009, 2010*, 2011, 2017, 2018*, 2020*
11	Bedford-N.L.	1980*, 1982*, 1991, 2012, 2013, 2014, 2015, 2018*, 2019, 2020*, 2023
9	Columbus East	1979, 1980*, 1982*, 2005*, 2006, 2007*, 2008, 2021, 2022
4	Floyd Central	1980*, 1982*, 2010*, 2025*
4	Jennings County	2001, 2002, 2024, 2025*
2	Seymour	2007*, 2016
2	New Albany	1999, 2005*
0	Bloomington North	
0	Madison	

=== Boys Soccer ===
#	Team	Seasons
17	Columbus East	1997*, 1998*, 2000*, 2004, 2005, 2006, 2007, 2009*, 2012, 2013, 2014, 2015, 2019, 2020*, 2021, 2024, 2025
10	New Albany	1990, 1991, 1992, 1993, 1994, 1997*, 2000*, 2001*, 2002*, 2022*
10	Floyd Central	1995*, 1996*, 2002*, 2003, 2008, 2010, 2017, 2020*, 2022*, 2023
7	Seymour	1997*, 1998*, 2001*, 2002*, 2009*, 2016, 2018
2	Jeffersonville	2011*, 2026
1	Jennings County	1997*
1	Madison	1995*
0	Bedford-N.L.	

- Boy Soccer information from 1990–present.
- *indicates share of title

== State champions ==
IHSAA State Champions

=== Bedford North Lawrence Stars (8) ===
- 1983 Girls Basketball
- 1990 Boys Basketball
- 1991 Girls Basketball
- 2013 Girls Basketball (4A)
- 2014 Girls Basketball (4A)
- 2019 Unified Flag Football
- 2022 Unified Track & Field
- 2023 Girls Basketball (4A)

=== Bloomington South Panthers (29) ===
- 1904 Boys Track
- 1919 Boys Basketball
- 1933 Boys Wrestling
- 1934 Boys Wrestling
- 1939 Boys Wrestling
- 1939 Boys Golf
- 1941 Boys Wrestling
- 1942 Boys Wrestling
- 1943 Boys Wrestling
- 1950 Boys Wrestling
- 1953 Boys Wrestling
- 1957 Boys Wrestling
- 1969 Boys Wrestling
- 1970 Boys Swimming
- 1970 Boys Wrestling
- 1971 Boys Swimming
- 1971 Boys Wrestling
- 1972 Boys Swimming
- 1972 Boys Wrestling
- 1972 Boys Baseball
- 1973 Boys Wrestling
- 1974 Girls Tennis
  * 1978 Boys Wrestling
- 1990 Girls Golf
- 1993 Football
- 1998 Football
- 2009 Boys Basketball (4A)
- 2011 Boys Basketball (4A)
- 2014 Girls Softball

=== Columbus East Olympians (6) ===
- 1979 Football (3A)
- 1983 Girls Swimming
- 1990 Girls Gymnastics
- 2013 Football (4A)
- 2017 Football (5A)
- 2025 Girls Wrestling

=== Floyd Central Highlanders (7) ===
- 1989 Girls Cross Country
- 1990 Girls Cross Country
- 1991 Girls Cross Country
- 1991 Boys Cross Country
- 1992 Girls Cross Country
- 2006 Boys Golf
- 2007 Boys Golf

=== Jeffersonville Red Devils (5) ===
- 1975 Girls Track
- 1977 Girls Track
- 1993 Boys Basketball
- 2011 Girls Basketball (4A)
- 2025 Boys Basketball (4A)

=== New Albany Bulldogs (5) ===
- 1967 Boys Tennis
- 1973 Boys Basketball
- 1987 Softball
- 1999 Girls Basketball (4A)
- 2016 Boys Basketball (4A)

=== Seymour Owls (3) ===
- 1988 Baseball
- 1990 Girls Golf
- 1991 Boys Golf
