= Lawrenceburg High School =

Location
- 100 Tiger Boulevard; Lawrenceburg, Dearborn County, Indiana 47025; United States; 39.099699°N 84.853231°W

Information
- Type: Public high school
- School district: Lawrenceburg Community School Corporation
- Principal: Jared Leiker
- Faculty: 40.00(FTE)
- Grades: 9-12
- Enrollment: 728(2023-2024)
- Student to teacher ratio: 18.20
- Color
- Team name: Tigers
- Rivals: South Dearborn High School; East Central High School
- Website: Official Website

Lawrenceburg High School is a high school located in Lawrenceburg, Indiana. The current building was built in 1937. In 1964 the new gym (later named the Bud Bateman gym) was built to bring the sectionals back to Lawrenceburg. The school was renovated in 1980–1981. This brought the addition of the auxiliary gym, swimming pool, auditorium, and new choir room, band room, and cafeteria. By 2011 the foundation in the Bud Bateman gym was shifting and it was demolished in 2014 and replaced with the current gymnasium in the same location. The new gym opened in 2015.

== See also ==
- List of high schools in Indiana
- Eastern Indiana Athletic Conference
