= St. Michael the Archangel Church, Madison =

Coordinates: 38°44′16.0″N 85°22′23.0″W

St. Michael the Archangel Catholic Church, est. 1839

Bishop Simon Gabriel Bruté de Remur of the Vincennes, Indiana Diocese

St. Michael the Archangel Church is a former Catholic church in Madison, Jefferson County, Indiana, United States. It was closely associated with Shawe Memorial High School which was named after the founder of this church.

== History ==
The town of Madison, Indiana was first settled by traveling hunters in the early 19th Century. In 1809, the town was officially mapped out by Col. John Paul. It was not until 1815 that residents of the town witnessed a Catholic Mass. Catholicism was not highly respected among the other religions in the city during this time and much of the 19th century. Many Catholics in the town were driven away from their faith due to the animosity towards the Church in Madison.

Bishop Simon Gabriel Bruté de Remur of the Vincennes, Indiana Diocese was determined to bring the faith to Madison permanently and serve to the ‘hidden’ Catholics of the town. Bruté sent missionary priests through town occasionally, but eventually called upon an Englishman by the name of Michael Edgar Shawe to serve to these Catholics as their first resident priest.

As a British officer, Shawe had fought Napoleon Bonaparte’s men at the Battle of Waterloo where he was wounded, then immigrated to the United States and was ordained the first Catholic priest in Indiana. Bishop Bruté wrote to Fr. Shawe at the beginning of Shawe’s time in Madison, telling him to “try with your usual, gentle and effective manner to make the best impression and beginning that you can in Madison”.

Fr. Shawe practised the Catholic faith to the few Catholics in the town's old Masonic Hall and later at the Madison Hotel (now the site of the Ruler's Grocery Store parking lot). Masons were typically anti-Catholic in those days; however the wife of one of the town's more prominent Masons, Mr. Caleb Schmidlapp, was accredited with the arrangement of the Masonic Hall location for mass. Mrs. Schmidlapp, a Catholic, moved to Madison from Cincinnati and attended Mass regularly while Fr. Shawe was in Madison.

== The railroad ==
With the building of the Madison-Indianapolis Railroad (one of Indiana's greatest public works projects in the 19th century), came a vast amount of Irish immigrants to build it. Some of these Irish-Catholics included such prominent figures as William Griffin, a railroad contractor; and the architect Francis Costigan whose buildings include the J.F.D. Lanier Mansion. An Irish-Catholic immigrant also in Madison at the time was Henry Dreier, another railroad contractor who later built the Broadway Hotel and Tavern (currently Indiana's oldest remaining Hotel and Tavern).

Bruté was very interested in the development of the Catholic Church in the town. In the spring of 1838, the Bishop called upon one of Fr. Shawe's assistant pastors to travel throughout the country and even parts of Canada to solicit funds for the building of Madison's first Catholic Church, St. Michael the Archangel. A vacant lot for the church was donated by one of Madison's Presbyterians, a Mr. McIntyre.

== Catholic Church founded ==
With the building of the church taking place, Bruté visited Madison a few weeks before his death. In May 1839, the Bishop came through Madison. While Bruté was in Madison, he administered three distant sick calls to dying Catholics (he was a doctor as well).

Costigan is believed to have been the Catholic architect of the church. Costigan was only recorded as being a member of the parish during the construction, but details of the church building mirror his other buildings in Madison. In December 1839 St. Michael the Archangel Catholic Church was completed.

== More Catholic churches ==
As the City of Madison grew, so did its Catholic population. German–Catholics had increased highly in numbers and had formed a separate congregation within St. Michael's.

In 1850, the Germans built St. Mary's Catholic Church two blocks south of St. Michael's. Gold trimming, extravagant statues and a much larger structure made St. Mary's the largest church in the city, of any faith, at the time In light of the new church being built downtown, Irish-Catholics living on the hill (North Madison) formed their own congregation adjacent to the John Steinberger farm, two years later. St. Patrick's Catholic Church was organized by Fr. Dupontavice, the Irish pastor of St. Michael's at the time.

Along with ‘the fighting Irish,’ years of 1852 through 1856, Catholics all over the nation (including Madison) were abused and tormented by a political group of anti-Catholics called the Know-Nothings. While no deaths took place in Madison (as so happened in several other cities), the Know-Nothings did invade the homes of several Madison Catholics, and even boasted about their goal of tearing down St. Michael's, which never took place.

The Irish-Catholics in Madison continued their work on the railroad, especially the Madison incline on the west side of town. It is said that the cuts from the incline were used to build the walls of St. Michael's. The Madison Incline was cut to bring the railroad, and all its passengers and products to downtown Madison's commercial district. Reuben Wells, the famed train engineer designed a locomotive specifically for the M-I Railroad to make the trip up this incline, the steepest in the United States. The locomotive, named for Wells, used 12 tons of power to push, rather than pull, cargo up the hill. The locomotive is currently on display at the Indianapolis Children's Museum. Another interesting feature of the church is its ceiling, which is designed to resemble an open Bible,

== One Catholic Church in Madison today ==
Prince of Peace Catholic Church

It was the arrival of Father Shawe that led to the building of St. Michael the Archangel Church in 1839 for the Catholics of Madison.

Since then, the Catholic Community of Jefferson County, Indiana has expanded to four churches and has returned to one church building and parish again. In 1992, the parishes of St. Mary's and St. Michael's became one community of faith, with one priest, Father John Meyer, and two church buildings. Saturday night mass was held at St. Michael's for St. Michael's ‘parishioners,’ and on Sunday morning, mass was held at St. Mary's. In 1993, the area's two other Catholic Churches (St. Patrick's and St. Anthony's) were merged with St. Mary's-St. Michael's as well.

St. Michael the Archangel was donated to Historic Madison Inc. by the Indianapolis Archdiocese in 1993 as part of the consolidation of the Catholic parishes in Madison. Information on tour availability is on the HMI website.
