= Scottsburg Senior High School =

School in Scottsburg, Indiana

Location
- 500 South Gardner Street; Scottsburg, Scott County, Indiana 47170; United States
- 38.680619°N 85.781243°W

Information
- Type: Public high school
- Principal: Jeff Cox
- Teaching staff: 46.00 (on an FTE basis)
- Grades: 9-12
- Enrollment: 678 (2024-2025)
- Student to teacher ratio: 14.74
- Color
- Athletics conference: Mid-Southern Conference of Indiana
- Nickname: Warriors
- Website: scsd2.k12.in.us/schools/scottsburg-high

Scottsburg Senior High School, also known as Scottsburg High School or SHS, is located in Scottsburg, Indiana, approximately 30 miles north of Louisville, Kentucky.

== History ==
Early in the 20th century, state health inspectors notified the School Board that "adverse" heating and sanitary conditions at Scottsburg High School would cause the school's commission to be withdrawn in June 1908. The Board began discussing a new building in 1911, since even after some improvements to the old two-story building, "in regard to space heating, lighting, ventilation, and sanitation, the old buildings have been somewhat improved in the last year but at best they are very congested, poorly heated, and with practically no ventilation or sanitation." By July 1912, the Board advertised for a heating contractor, and C. E. Bacon, architect of Indianapolis, was hired to create plans for a new building. A cornerstone was laid in Fall 1912, and by May 1913 the senior class was performing the class play in the new auditorium. A gymnasium was added in 1926.

During the Great Depression, salaries of teachers and staff had to be reduced by 5% in 1931 and again in 1932. By the beginning of the 1939–1940 school year, enrollment topped out at 256 students.

On April 6, 1949, most of the school's 277 pupils organized a parade in protest of the school board refusing to renew principal Eugene Butler's contract. The next day, students picketed outside the school. The protests were successful, and he was rehired after parents voted to reinstate him.

By 1954, bonds were sold to citizens of Scott County to raise funds for a new gym and junior high building for the Scottsburg-Vienna Township Joint School. The Charles E. Meyer Gymnasium was finished in 1956, at a cost of US$ 500,000.

== Athletics ==
Scottsburg High School's teams are the Warriors and the Warrioretts, and they compete in the Mid-Southern Conference of Indiana. Scottsburg competes in twenty one varsity sports. Scottsburg High School reinstated football in 2014 and it was a full varsity sport by the Fall of 2017. SHS also has teams that compete in archery and bowling, which are not IHSAA sanctioned but sponsored by their organizations.

The Warriorettes basketball team have had seven players named to the elite Indiana All-Stars and legendary coach Donna Cheatham coached the All-Stars in 1986. In 1989, under the direction of Hall of Famer Donna Cheatham, the team defeated Benton Central to win their first and only state championship in basketball. The Warriorettes have won 16 sectional titles, 10 regional titles, three semi-state titles, and one State Championship. Retired Warriorette coach Donna Cheatham is the winningest girls basketball coach in the state.

The Boys' Basketball team at Scottsburg has produced two All-Stars in LaVerne Altemeyer and Bill James. The winningest boys' coach in Scottsburg history is Jim Barley and he holds a record of 193–91. The Warriors have won 23 sectionals and six regionals. The 2022-2023 Warriors team was the IHSAA Boys Basketball Semi-State Runner Ups against Guerin Catholic with a final score of 56–40. The county rival is Austin High School located in Austin, which is also located in Scott County. The two schools have the county rivalry games in boys and girls basketball Thanksgiving week.

SHS Cheer Team has won four state titles, in 2006, 2008, 2009, and 2010.

Some sports SHS offers include:

- Cross country running (men's and women's)
- Volleyball
- Soccer
- Tennis (men's and women's)
- Golf (men's and women's)
- Basketball (men's and women's)
- Baseball
- Softball
- Wrestling
- Football
- Cheerleading
- Track and field (men's and women's)

== Performing arts ==
The Scottsburg Band of Warriors have made 30 appearances to the Indiana State School Music Association (ISSMA) State finals since 1983.

The concert bands, divided as Symphonic (Group I Level) and Concert (Group II or III Level), are consistent gold rated and contest winners, including the Shenandoah Apple Blossom Festival, ISSMA Concert Band Festival, and ISSMA Concert Band State Finals. The jazz ensemble, brass choir, woodwind choir and other mixed ensembles are consistent ISSMA Solo and Ensemble State Finalist and Gold Rating recipients. The Winter Guard, a sub-division of the band program, ranks as one of the top in the state and nation.

The Scottsburg Concert Percussion was formed in 2011. The group competes in the TriState Marching Arts circuit and Winter Guard International. Scottsburg was the only school with under 900 students enrolled to be named a finalists in WGI World Percussion Championships.

Scottsburg High School also has a choral department. The Scottsburg High School Choir has also competed at the Indiana Music Education Association's Circle the State With Song competition.

== Notable alumni ==
- Billy James (1969), professional basketball player, ABA
- Carrie Daniels (1991), college basketball coach
- Erin Houchin (1994), U.S. representative for Indiana's 9th congressional district
- Chris Garten (2000), Majority leader of the Indiana Senate

== See also ==
- List of high schools in Indiana
