= St. Leon, Indiana =

- Town
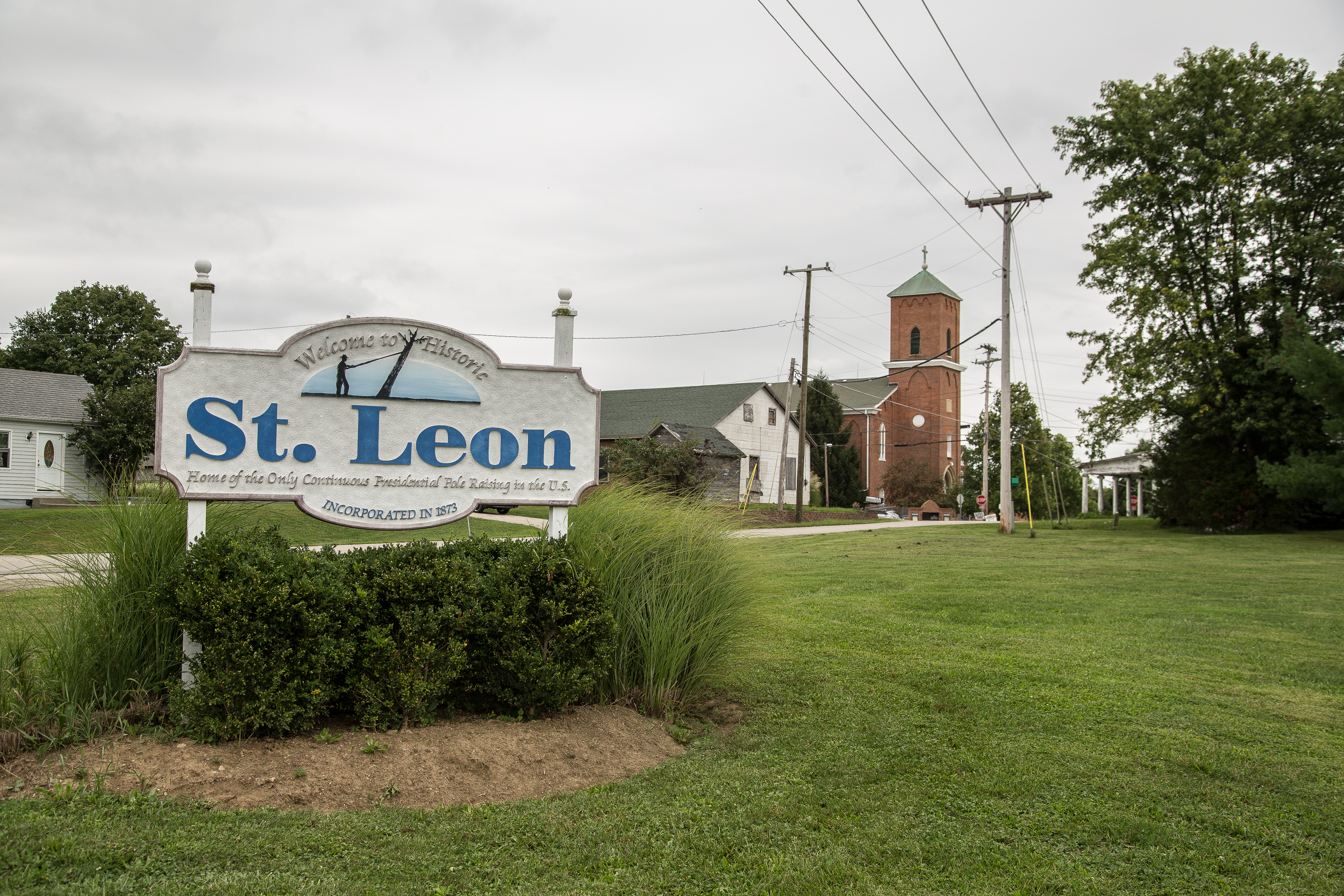

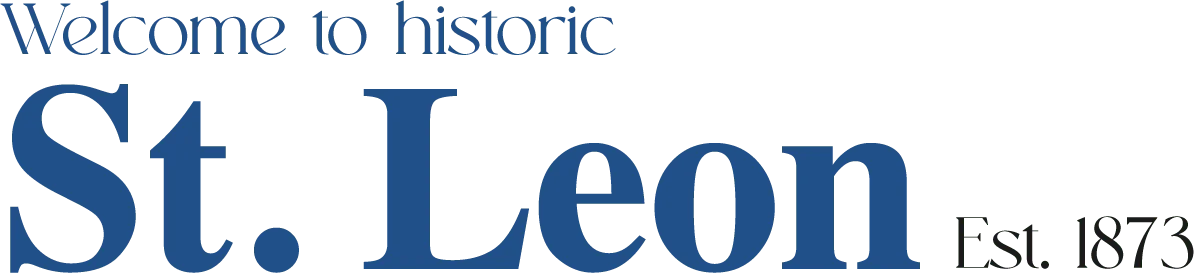
- Logo

- Location of St. Leon in Dearborn County, Indiana.
- Coordinates: 39°17′39″N 84°59′02″W
- Country: United States
- State: Indiana
- County: Dearborn
- Township: Kelso

Area
  - Total: 6.84 sq mi (17.71 km^{2})
  - Land: 6.83 sq mi (17.68 km^{2})
  - Water: 0.012 sq mi (0.03 km^{2})
- Elevation: 1,004 ft (306 m)

Population (2020)
  - Total: 660
  - Density: 96.7/sq mi (37.32/km^{2})
- Time zone: UTC-5 (EST)
  - Summer (DST): UTC-4 (EDT)
- Area code: 812
- FIPS code
- GNIS feature ID: 2396899
- Website: townofstleon.com

St. Leon or Saint Leon is a town in Kelso Township, Dearborn County, Indiana, United States. The population was 660 at the 2020 census.

== History ==
A post office was established at St. Leon in 1852, and remained in operation until it was discontinued in 1955. The town was likely named for St. Leon Bembo.

== Geography ==
According to the 2010 census, St. Leon has a total area of 6.989 square miles (18.10 km^{2}), of which 6.98 square miles (18.08 km^{2}) (or 99.87%) is land and 0.009 square miles (0.02 km^{2}) (or 0.13%) is water.

== Demographics ==
Historical population
Census	Pop.	Note	%±
1880	254		—
1890	368		44.9%
1900	369		0.3%
1910	261		−29.3%
1920	257		−1.5%
1930	276		7.4%
1940	276		0.0%
1950	288		4.3%
1960	319		10.8%
1970	435		36.4%
1980	515		18.4%
1990	493		−4.3%
2000	387		−21.5%
2010	678		75.2%
2020	660		−2.7%
U.S. Decennial Census

=== 2010 census ===
As of the census of 2010, there were 678 people, 252 households, and 182 families living in the town. The population density was 97.1 inhabitants per square mile (37.5/km^{2}). There were 263 housing units at an average density of 37.7 per square mile (14.6/km^{2}). The racial makeup of the town was 98.1% White, 0.1% African American, 0.6% Asian, 0.4% from other races, and 0.7% from two or more races. Hispanic or Latino of any race were 0.3% of the population.

There were 252 households, of which 36.5% had children under the age of 18 living with them, 59.1% were married couples living together, 9.5% had a female householder with no husband present, 3.6% had a male householder with no wife present, and 27.8% were non-families. 24.2% of all households were made up of individuals, and 9.9% had someone living alone who was 65 years of age or older. The average household size was 2.69 and the average family size was 3.23.

The median age in the town was 36.2 years. 26.8% of residents were under the age of 18; 9% were between the ages of 18 and 24; 24.9% were from 25 to 44; 26.2% were from 45 to 64; and 13.1% were 65 years of age or older. The gender makeup of the town was 50.0% male and 50.0% female.

=== 2000 census ===
As of the census of 2000, there were 387 people, 133 households, and 109 families living in the town. The population density was 54.0 inhabitants per square mile (20.8/km^{2}). There were 139 housing units at an average density of 19.4 per square mile (7.5/km^{2}). The racial makeup of the town was 99.74% White and 0.26% Asian.

There were 133 households, out of which 35.3% had children under the age of 18 living with them, 74.4% were married couples living together, 6.0% had a female householder with no husband present, and 17.3% were non-families. 15.8% of all households were made up of individuals, and 8.3% had someone living alone who was 65 years of age or older. The average household size was 2.91 and the average family size was 3.25.

In the town, the population was spread out, with 27.1% under the age of 18, 7.2% from 18 to 24, 25.6% from 25 to 44, 23.8% from 45 to 64, and 16.3% who were 65 years of age or older. The median age was 38 years. For every 100 females, there were 107.0 males. For every 100 females age 18 and over, there were 104.3 males.

The median income for a household in the town was $39,821, and the median income for a family was $52,000. Males had a median income of $42,500 versus $19,107 for females. The per capita income for the town was $19,225. About 5.7% of families and 8.4% of the population were below the poverty line, including 18.6% of those under age 18 and none of those age 65 or over.

== Education ==
St. Leon, Indiana, is served by East Central High School which draws from many surrounding areas as well.

== Recreation ==
Saint Leon, Indiana is home to Wifflerama (Wiffleball tournament) the 2nd weekend of August since 1994.
