= Shawe Memorial High School =

Location
- 201 West State Street; Madison, (Jefferson County), Indiana 47250; United States; 38°45′29″N 85°23′20″W

Information
- Type: Private, Coeducational
- Motto: "Spiritus, Mentis, et Corpus" (Spirit, Mind, and Body)
- Religious affiliation: Roman Catholic
- Established: 1952/1954
- Oversight: Archdiocese of Indianapolis
- Principal: Curt David Gardner
- Pastor: Fr. Rick Nagel
- Faculty: 20
- Grades: 7–12
- Campus: Suburban
- Campus size: 20 acres (81,000 m^{2})
- Colors: Green and gold
- Athletics conference: Ohio River Valley
- Team name: Hilltoppers
- Accreditation: North Central Association of Colleges and Schools
- Website: www.popeaceschools.org

Father Michael Shawe Memorial Jr./Sr. High School is a private, Roman Catholic high school in Madison, Indiana. It is run by the Roman Catholic Archdiocese of Indianapolis.

== Founding ==
Founded in 1952, the first class of freshman students was taught in the former St. Michael's Elementary school building, until 1954 when the new facility on Madison's hilltop opened. The school was named for Father Shawe who had founded Madison's first Catholic church, St. Michael the Archangel Church in 1839. But in 1951, the dream of a Catholic high school in a town of less than 10,000 people seemed almost impossible. Back then the hilltop of Madison was mainly all farmland, some of which had been donated to the local Catholic Church (St. Patrick's) years before.

== Madison becomes desolate ==
Adding to the city's downfall of the 1850s, new railroad companies were formed throughout the Midwest, competing with the Madison-Indianapolis Railroad. Eventually, fewer and fewer people were visiting Madison, as stated in the following citizen's journal. “Everyday, families are leaving, and every day Madison is growing quieter. You cannot imagine what excitement it causes in our house now if guest comes, for now no travelers pass through Madison any longer. Madison is daily growing more monotonous and quiet and soon not a soul, except of course ourselves, will be left here”.

== University of Notre Dame and Fr. Shawe ==
Father Shawe left St. Michael's in 1842 to become the Professor of Rhetoric at a new university in the growing Northern Indiana town of South Bend. Fr. Shawe laid the cornerstone of the University of Notre Dame on August 26, 1843. His teachings were very successful; the Golden Jubilee History of Notre Dame states, “soon came the eloquent and polished Father Michael E. Shawe, the promoter of Rhetoric and English Literature and the founder of the literary societies at Notre Dame … Here his memory is preserved with enthusiasm as one who gave to the university its first tendency towards that high literacy excellence to which it has attained”.

Fr. Shawe's dedication to Catholic education was the foundation to Madison's own Catholic education system. With his dismissal from St. Michael's came the founding of Madison's first parochial schools.

== The Catholic Church in Madison ==
It was the arrival of Father Shawe that led to the building of St. Michael the Archangel Church in 1839 and this grew into four separate churches. Since then they have become one again.

== A new Catholic High School ==
News article

In 1951 after the priests of the area were told at a meeting in North Vernon that the Mother Superior of the Ursuline Sisters in Louisville, Kentucky, was willing to staff a Catholic High School in Madison. The catch: the two parochial grade schools would have to combine into one. This was a great step in uniting the two churches.

"Looking Back: The Story of the Hilltopper" was written to commemorate the 50th anniversary of the school which benefited the student newspaper, The Topper Tribune.

At the beginning of the academic year in the Fall of 1952, students from both parishes who were in grades one through six were taught in the St. Mary's school building, while students in grades seven, eight, and the first of the high school classes were at St. Michael's school building.

That same year, the first freshman class of Madison Central Catholic High School (the temporary name) began lessons ranging from Calculus to Biology in the St. Michael's school building. The high school building, which was planned to be built on the hilltop of Madison, was not yet built.

== New school building ==
The first graduating class (1956)

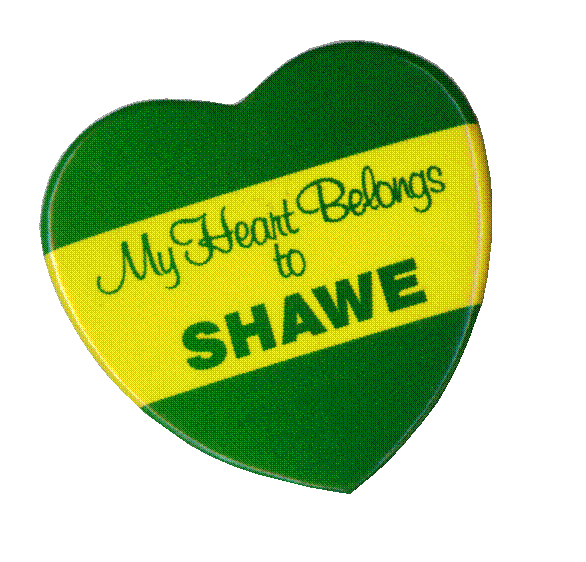
Spirit button

In the fall of 1954, the school building was ready for its first classes. The little red-brick Catholic High School was fully loaded with a gymnasium, biology lab, chapel and cafeteria; all at a cost of $250,000. Archbishop Schulte suggested the name for the new school: Fr. Michael Edgar Shawe Memorial High School. The Madison Central Catholic athletes would also change their name from the Tigers to the current, Hilltoppers.

In 1967, the grade school students who were taught in the two grade schools downtown were welcomed into their new school adjacent to the high school on the hilltop. Pope John XXIII Elementary opened with the same fundraising used in the opening of Shawe Memorial.

== See also ==
- List of high schools in Indiana
