= Mid-Southern Conference =

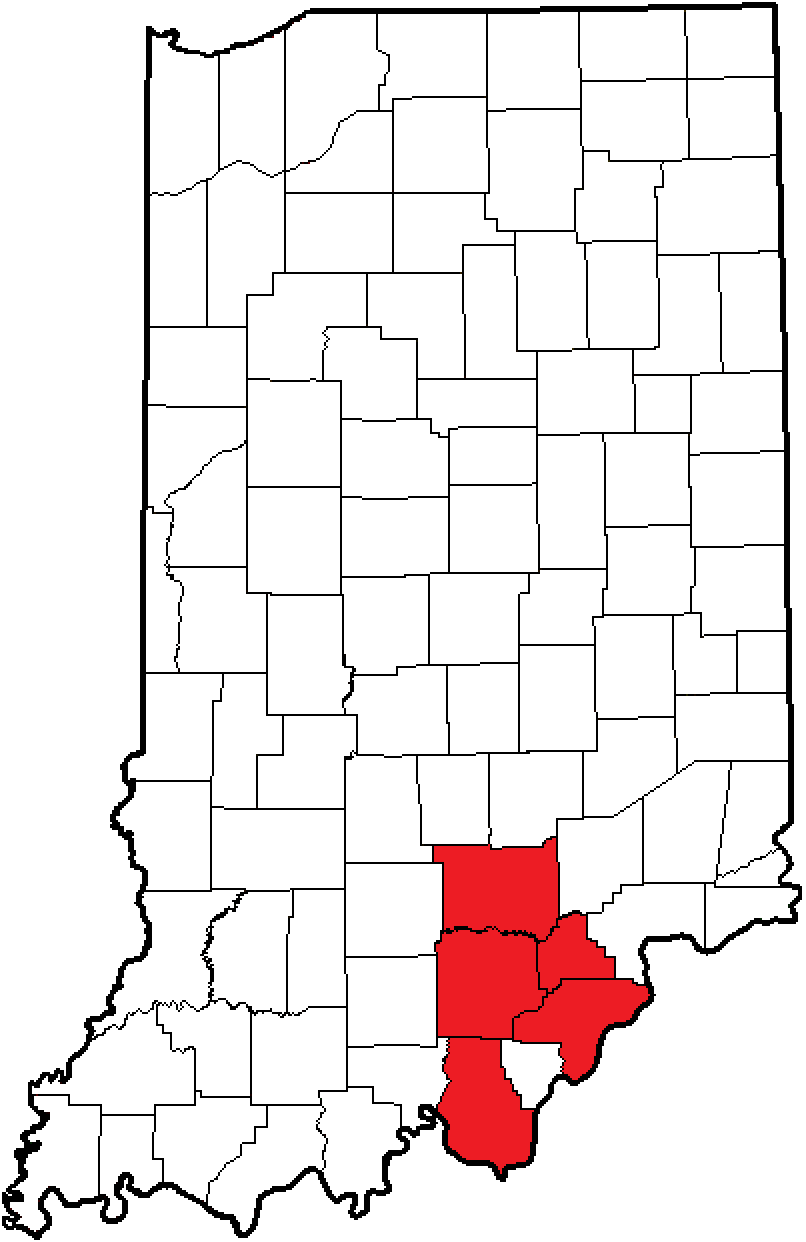
The Mid-Southern Conference in Indiana

The Mid-Southern Conference is an eight-member IHSAA-Sanctioned Athletic Conference within the South Central Indiana counties of Clark, Harrison, Jackson, Scott, and Washington.

== History ==
The conference began in 1958, with seven schools leaving the Southeastern Indiana Conference and allying with three schools from Clark County (whose previous conference affiliations are in need of research). The first decade-plus within the league was stable, as the only change was Brownstown becoming Brownstown Central due to consolidation in Jackson County. Meanwhile, the 1970s proved to be a comparatively tumultuous decade. Mitchell joined the Blue Chip Conference in 1970, seeking for conference rivals to the west. They were replaced by Floyd Central, which had been independent since forming three years earlier. Austin, which did not sponsor football, joined the Southern Athletic Conference in 1974 while maintaining MSC membership. This allowed the Eagles to ally themselves with other non-football schools, yet maintain the traditional rivalries from the SEIC. Silver Creek also did not have football, while Scottsburg dropped it in the 1970s, yet they were much larger than most schools that didn't offer the sport. In 2014 they reinstated the football program.

Floyd Central grew much faster than anticipated, and by 1976 had outgrown the other schools, necessitating a move to the Hoosier Hills Conference. This marked the first time membership had dropped below ten schools, though this would only last for two years. North Harrison, a school that had outgrown the small-school Blue River Conference and was within the MSC footprint, joined after starting their football team, bring the league back to 10 schools with seven football-playing members.

Paoli was the next school to make a change, becoming a charter member of the Patoka Lake Conference while maintaining MSC membership. This lasted for six years, as Paoli decided the more geographically compact PLC was better suited to their needs, leaving the Mid-Southern in 1985. There was concern that Austin would also leave, being the other dual-conference member, but Austin would instead leave the SAC in 1987 being by far the largest school in the Southern, as well as being competitively dominant. The conference would stay with a nine school, six football team setup for 16 years, the longest period of stability since the league was founded.

The conference once again moved to ten members when Eastern (Pekin) decided to start a football team in the early 2000s. They had grown not only to the point where football was feasible, but also too large for the Southern, and joined the MAC in 2003. The number of football schools would move from six to eight by the end of the decade. Eastern would unveil their football team in 2007, while Silver Creek would start their own team in 2010.

Current Mid-Southern Conference standings, schedules and information can be located at www.mscsports.org; launched beginning the fall of 2014, the site will soon include an abundance of archived information.

== Membership ==
School	Location	Mascot	Colors	Enrollment 24–25	IHSAA Class	# / County	Year joined	Previous conference
Austin^{1}	Austin	Eagles		407	2A	72; Scott	1958	Southeastern Indiana
Brownstown Central	Brownstown	Braves		469	3A	36; Jackson	1965	none (new school)
Charlestown	Charlestown	Pirates		845	3A	10; Clark	1958	Clark County
Corydon Central	Corydon	Panthers		754	3A	31; Harrison	1958	Southeastern Indiana
North Harrison	Ramsey	Cougars		629	3A	31; Harrison	1978	Independents (BRC 1974)
Salem	Salem	Lions		494	2A	88; Washington	1958	Southeastern Indiana
Scottsburg	Scottsburg	Warriors		726	4A	72; Scott	1958	Southeastern Indiana
Silver Creek	Sellersburg	Dragons		943	3A	10; Clark	1958	Clark County

1. Austin was also a member of the Southern Athletic Conference from 1974 to 1987.

=== Future members ===
School	Location	Mascot	Colors	County	Year joining	Previous conference
Madison	Madison	Cubs		39; Jefferson	2026	Independent

=== Former members ===
School	Location	Mascot	Colors	County	Year joined	Previous conference	Year left	Conference joined
Brownstown	Brownstown	Bears		36; Jackson	1958	Southeastern Indiana	1965	none (consolidated into Brownstown Central)
Mitchell	Mitchell	Bluejackets		47; Lawrence	1958	Southeastern Indiana	1970	Blue Chip
Paoli^{1}	Paoli	Rams		59; Orange	1958	Southeastern Indiana	1985	Patoka Lake
Floyd Central	Floyds Knobs	Highlanders		22; Floyd	1970	Independents	1976	Hoosier Hills
Clarksville	Clarksville	Generals		10; Clark	1958	Clark County	2020	Independent
Eastern (Pekin)	New Pekin	Musketeers		88; Washington	2003	Southern	2025	Southern

1. Paoli was also a member of the Patoka Lake Conference from 1979 until it left the MSC in 1985.

== Conference champions ==
Asterisks denote split championships.

=== Football ===
#	Team	Seasons
22	Brownstown Central	1968*, 1981, 1982*, 1995, 1996, 1997, 1998*, 1999, 2000, 2001, 2002, 2003, 2004, 2005*, 2010, 2011, 2013, 2014, 2016, 2018, 2019, 2021
16	Charlestown	1975, 1977, 1978, 1979, 1980, 1982*, 1985*, 1987, 1988, 1989, 1998*, 2007, 2008*, 2009, 2012, 2022
15	Clarksville	1964, 1965, 1967, 1969, 1970*, 1971, 1972, 1973, 1974, 1976, 1983*, 1984, 1985*, 1986, 2006
8	Salem	1962, 1990, 1991, 1992, 1993, 1994, 2005*, 2008*
2	Corydon Central	1968*, 1983*
2	North Harrison	2015, 2017
2	Paoli	1966, 1968*
1	Floyd Central	1970*
1	Mitchell	1963
1	Silver Creek	2020
0	Eastern (Pekin)	
0	Scottsburg	

- Scottsburg dropped football after the 1983 season, but revived the sport in 2017. Eastern began their football program in 2007, and Silver Creek in 2011.

=== Boys basketball ===
#	Team	Seasons
21	Brownstown Central	1963, 1968*, 1976, 1981*, 1983*, 1984*, 1986, 1989*, 1991, 2004, 2005, 2006, 2010, 2011*, 2012*, 2013, 2014*, 2016, 2017, 2022*, 2023
15	Scottsburg	1964*, 1965*, 1967, 1968*, 1969, 1981*, 1988*, 1989*, 1992, 1995*, 1996, 1999*, 2000, 2003*, 2007
12	Silver Creek	1966, 1970*, 1971, 1973, 1979, 1980, 1983*, 1995*, 1997, 1998, 1999*, 2012*, 2018
10	Corydon Central	1960*, 1968*, 1970*, 1984*, 1985, 1993, 1994, 2001, 2011*, 2014*
7	North Harrison	1981*, 1987*, 1988*, 1989*, 2003*, 2021, 2022*
6	Charlestown	1965*, 1981*, 1987*, 1990, 2008*, 2011*
5	Clarksville	1974, 1977, 1978, 2012*, 2014*
3	Austin	1981*, 1999*, 2002
3	Paoli	1959, 1960*, 1961
3	Salem	1982, 2008*, 2009
2	Floyd Central	1972, 1975
2	Mitchell	1962, 1964*

=== Girls basketball ===
#	Team	Seasons
24	Scottsburg	1976, 1977, 1978, 1979, 1981*, 1983, 1985*, 1986*, 1987*, 1988, 1989, 1990, 1991, 1993*, 1994, 1995, 1996, 2002*, 2004*, 2007, 2011*, 2012*, 2013*, 2014*
8	Austin	1980, 1981*, 1982, 1984, 1985*, 2008, 2010, 2013*
8	Corydon Central	1981*, 1986*, 1999, 2000, 2004*, 2005, 2006, 2023
8	North Harrison	1987*, 2002*, 2003, 2004*, 2009, 2016, 2017, 2018
5	Charlestown	1992, 1993*, 1997*, 1998, 2000
5	Brownstown Central	1997, 2001, 2011*, 2014*, 2020*
2	Salem	2019, 2020*
2	Silver Creek	2021, 2022
1	Clarksville	1987*
1	Eastern (Pekin)	2012*
0	Floyd Central	
0	Paoli	

== Resources ==
- IHSAA Conferences
- IHSAA Directory
