= Switzerland County Senior High School =

Switzerland County High School

Location
- 1020 West Main Street; Vevay, Switzerland County, Indiana 47043; United States; 38.741281°N 85.079900°W

Information
- Type: Public high school
- Motto: Pacer Strong
- Established: 1969
- School district: Switzerland County School Corporation
- Superintendent: Rodney Hite
- Principal: Ashley Kitts
- Faculty: 24.50 (FTE)
- Grades: 9-12
- Enrollment: 469 (2023-24)
- Student to teacher ratio: 19.14
- Color
- Athletics conference: Ohio River Valley Conference
- Team name: Pacers
- Website: Official Website

Switzerland County High School is a public high school located in Vevay, Indiana.

== History ==
The doors of the school were opened in 1968 with the consolidation of the Patriot Trojans and Vevay Warriors. It was established in 1969

== Athletics ==
Switzerland County Senior High School's athletic teams are called the Pacers, and they compete in the Ohio River Valley Conference.

=== Basketball ===
The 2015-2016 Men's basketball team went 7-16 overall and lost to North Decatur High School by a score of 61–51 in the sectional semi-finals of the 2015-16 IHSAA Class 2A Boys Basketball State Tournament.

== See also ==
- List of high schools in Indiana
