= Greensburg Community High School =

Location
- 1000 East Central Avenue; Greensburg, Decatur County, Indiana 47240; United States
- Coordinates: 39.340961°N 85.468410°W

Information
- Type: Public high school
- School district: Greensburg Community Schools
- Superintendent: Tom Hunter
- Principal: Mike Myers
- Teaching staff: 46.83 (on an FTE basis)
- Grades: 9-12
- Enrollment: 662 (2023-2024)
- Student to teacher ratio: 14.14
- Color
- Team name: Pirates
- Website: Official Website

Greensburg Community High School is a high school located in Greensburg, Indiana.

== See also ==
- List of high schools in Indiana
- Eastern Indiana Athletic Conference
- Greensburg, Indiana
