= Billy James (basketball) =

American basketball player

Personal information
- Born: February 11, 1950 (age 76)
- Listed height: 6 ft 3 in (1.91 m)
- Listed weight: 185 lb (84 kg)

Career information
- High school: Scottsburg (Scottsburg, Indiana)
- College: Tyler JC (1969–1971); Marshall (1971–1973)
- NBA draft: 1973: undrafted
- Position: Point guard
- Number: 33

Career history
- 1974: Kentucky Colonels
- Stats at Basketball Reference

Mack William James (born February 11, 1950) is an American professional basketball player. He had played collegiately at Tyler Junior College and Marshall University before joining the Kentucky Colonels in the American Basketball Association in early January 1974. He appeared in one game for the Colonels before being waived at the end of the month to make room for rookie Jim Bradley.
