= Jennings County High School =

Location
- 800 West Walnut St; North Vernon, Indiana 47265; United States
- Coordinates: 38°59′56″N 85°38′29″W

Information
- Type: Public high school
- Principal: Dustin Roller
- Teaching staff: 72.00 (on a FTE basis)
- Grades: 9-12
- Enrollment: 1,174 (2023-2024)
- Student to teacher ratio: 16.31
- Color
- Athletics conference: Hoosier Hills
- Nickname: Panthers
- Rival: Seymour High School
- Website: jchs.jcsc.org

Jennings County High School is a public high school located in North Vernon, Indiana.

== Demographics ==
The demographic breakdown of the 1,423 students enrolled in 2014-15 was:

- Male - 50.2%
- Female - 49.8%
- Native American/Alaskan - 0.4%
- Asian - 0%
- Native Hawaiian/Pacific Islander - 0%
- Black - 0.8%
- Hispanic - 3.3%
- White - 93.4%
- Multiracial - 2.1%

49.4% of the students were eligible for free or reduced lunch.

== Athletics ==
The Jennings County Panthers are members of the Hoosier Hills Conference. The school colors are red, white and blue. The following IHSAA sanctioned sports are available:

- Baseball (boys')
- Basketball (boys' and girls')
- Cross country (boys' and girls')
- Football (boys')
- Golf (boys' and girls'
- Soccer (boys' and girls')
- Softball (girls')
- Swimming (boys' and girls')
- Tennis (boys' and girls')
- Track (boys' and girls')
- Volleyball (girls')
- Wrestling (boys')

== Notable alumni ==
- Scott Earl - Former MLB player for the Detroit Tigers.

== See also ==
- List of high schools in Indiana
