= Southwestern High School (Hanover, Indiana) =

Location
- 167 S Main Cross St; Hanover, Indiana 47243; United States
- 38.710177°N 85.472911°W

Information
- Type: Public high school
- Established: 1960
- Locale: rural town
- School district: Southwestern-Jefferson County Consolidated
- Principal: Matthew Owens
- Faculty: 29.33 (FTE)
- Grades: 9-12
- Enrollment: 354 (2023-24)
- Student to teacher ratio: 12.07
- Colors: Navy, red, and white
- Athletics conference: Ohio River Valley
- Team name: Rebels
- Snapshot: HS
- Website: Official Website

Southwestern High School is located in Hanover, Indiana. It is a part of the Southwestern Jefferson County Consolidated Schools school district.

The district includes Hanover and Kent. The townships in the district are Hanover, Republican, Saluda, and Smyrna.

== History ==
Southwestern High School was founded in 1960 with the consolidation of Saluda and Hanover high schools. Since the two schools were located in the southwestern region of Jefferson County, Indiana, the school was officially named Southwestern Jefferson County Consolidated High School. Originally, the school was located in the edifice of the old Hanover High School. However, the old school was severely damaged in the April 3, 1974, tornado Super Outbreak that ravaged much of the Midwest. The current building was built over the following year.

== See also ==
- List of high schools in Indiana
