= Salem High School (Indiana) =

High school in Indiana, United States

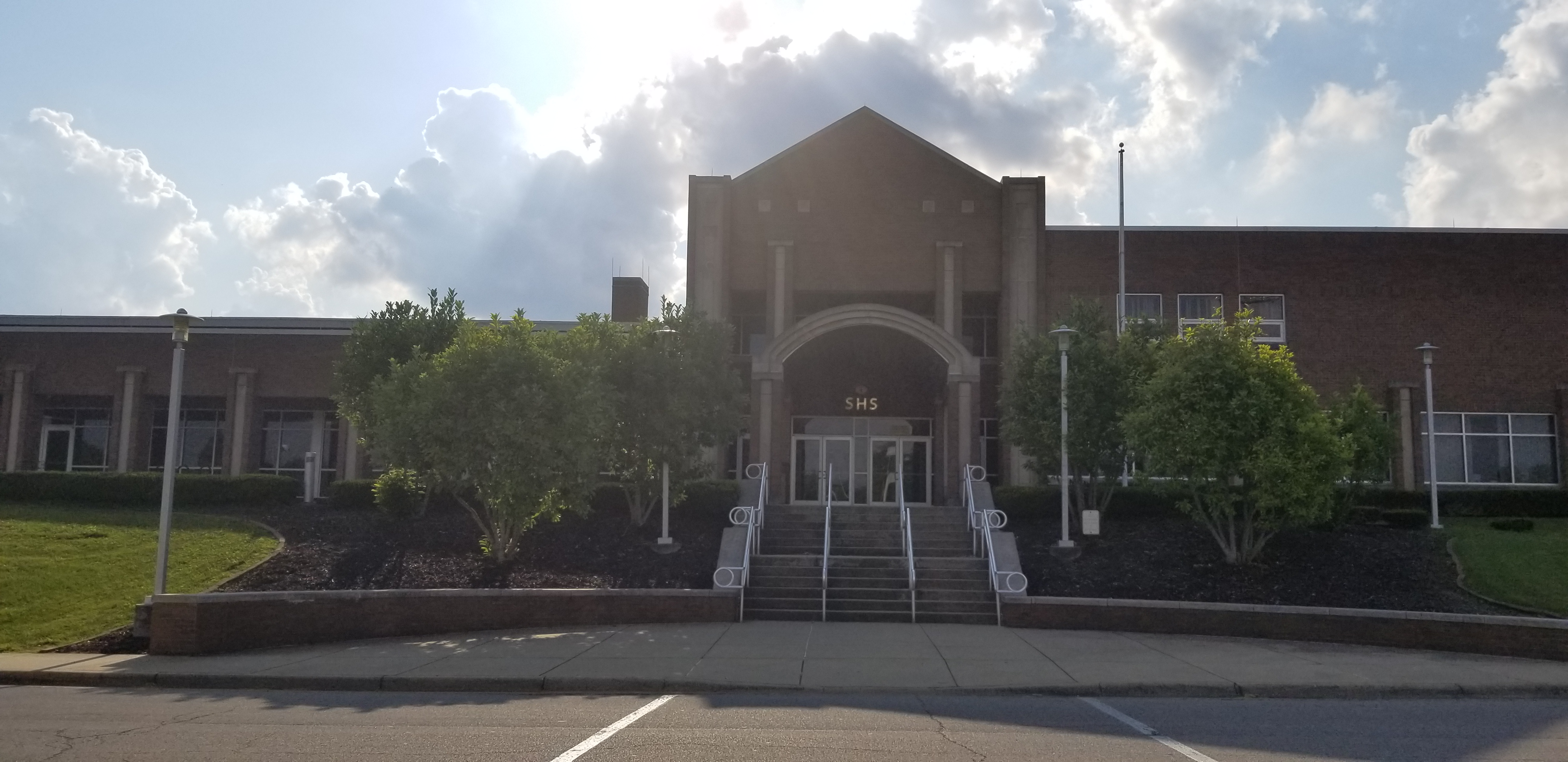

Location
- 700 N Harrison Street; Salem, Washington County, Indiana 47167; United States; 38.611722°N 86.106750°W

Information
- Type: Public high school
- School district: Salem Community Schools
- Principal: Robert Setser
- Teaching staff: 39.50 (FTE)
- Grades: 9–12
- Enrollment: 492 (2024–2025)
- Student to teacher ratio: 12.46
- Color
- Athletics: Basketball, baseball, cheerleading, cross country, football (women's), golf, tennis, volleyball, wrestling, softball, track and field, soccer
- Athletics conference: Mid-Southern
- Team name: Lions
- Rival: Eastern High School (Pekin, Indiana)
- Newspaper: The Cub
- Yearbook: The Lyon
- Website: Official Website

Salem High School is a public high school located in Salem, Indiana. It is a class 3A school with an approximate enrollment of around 638 as of 2007. Salem High School is a part of the Salem Community School corporation, which is a Standard Bearer District. The school colors are black and gold. Salem High School's newspaper is called The Cub and the yearbook is called The Lyon.

== Athletics ==
Salem High School's athletic teams are the Lions and they compete in the Mid-Southern Conference of Indiana. The school offers a wide range of athletics including:

- Baseball
- Basketball (Men's and Women's)
- Cheerleading
- Cross Country (Men's and Women's)
- Football
- Golf (Men's and Women's)
- Soccer (Men's and Women's)
- Softball
- Swimming (Men's and Women's)
- Tennis (Men's and Women's)
- Track (Men's and Women's)
- Volleyball
- Wrestling
- Marching Band

== See also ==
- List of high schools in Indiana
- Mid-Southern Conference of Indiana
- Salem, Indiana
