= Old Pekin, Indiana =

- Unincorporated community
- Washington County's location in Indiana

- Old Pekin's location in Washington County
- Coordinates: 38°29′50″N 86°00′12″W
- Country: United States
- State: Indiana
- County: Washington
- Township: Polk
- Elevation: 738 ft (225 m)
- Time zone: UTC-5 (Eastern (EST))
  - Summer (DST): UTC-4 (EDT)
- ZIP code: 47165
- Area codes: 812, 930
- GNIS feature ID: 449044

Old Pekin (also referred to as Pekin and Pekin Station) is an unincorporated community in Polk Township, Washington County, in the U.S. state of Indiana.

The community is the site of Eastern High School.

== History ==
Pekin is known for having the nation's longest running consecutive Fourth of July celebration.

== Geography ==
Old Pekin is located just southeast of the larger incorporated town of New Pekin, at 38°29′50″N 86°00′12″W.
