= Columbus East High School =

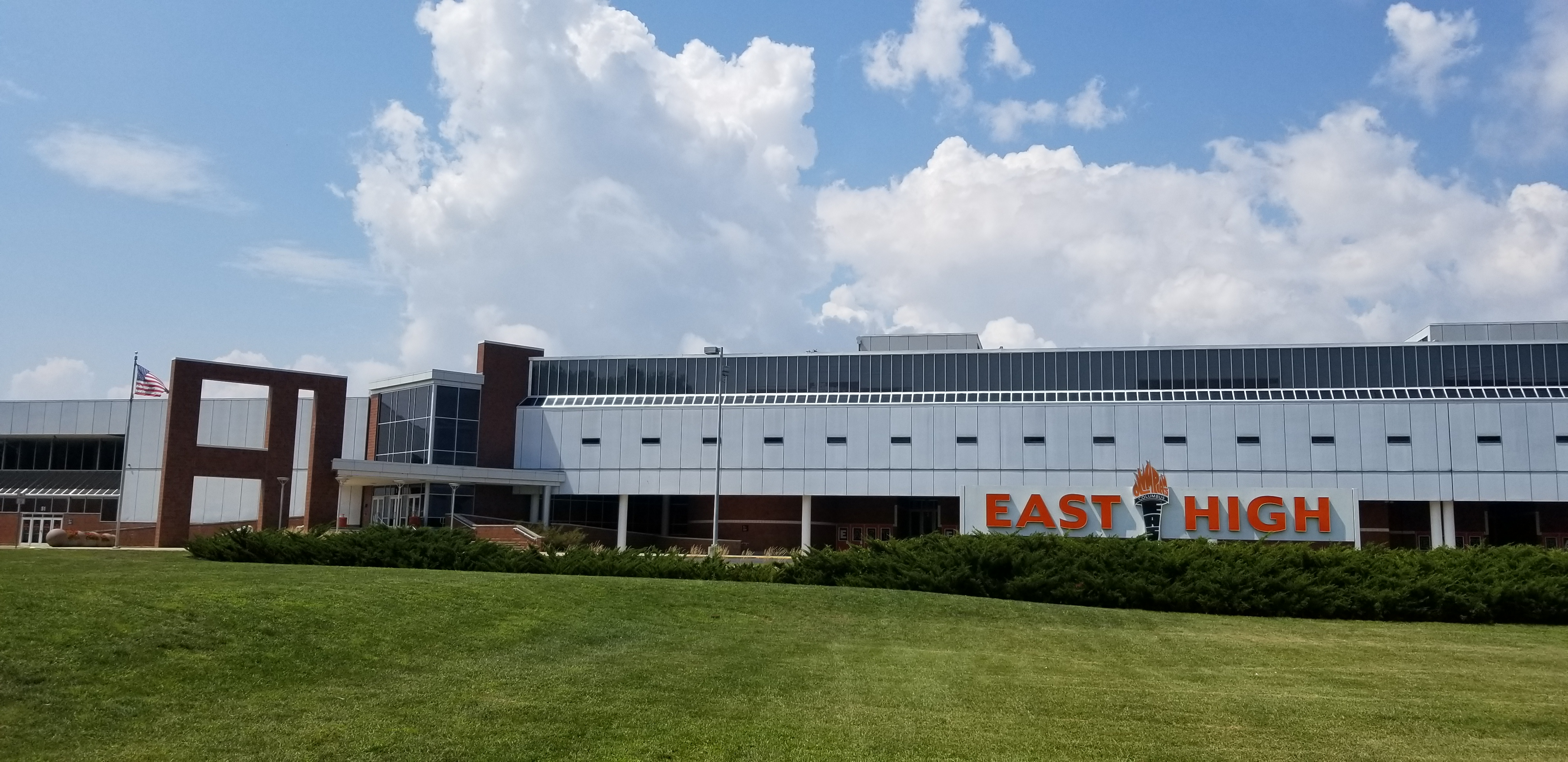

Location
- 230 South Marr Road; Columbus, Indiana 47201; United States; 39°11′44″N 85°53′10″W

Information
- Type: Public high school
- Established: 1972
- School district: Bartholomew Consolidated School Corporation
- Principal: Michael Parsons
- Teaching staff: 88.00 (on an FTE basis)
- Enrollment: 1,518 (2023–2024)
- Student to teacher ratio: 17.25
- Colors: Orange and brown
- Athletics conference: Hoosier Hills Conference
- Nickname: Olympians
- Website: east.bcscschools.org

Columbus East High School (CEHS) is one of three high schools in Columbus, Indiana, United States. East is a member of the Hoosier Hills Conference in athletics and has a total of 5 IHSAA state championships. It was founded in 1972 due to the growing educational demands of the community. As the population of the community rose, Columbus High School could not support all school age students. Columbus East was constructed and Columbus High School became Columbus North High School.

== Athletics ==
The Columbus East Olympians competes in the Hoosier Hills Conference. The school colors are orange and brown. The following IHSAA sanctioned sports are offered:

- Baseball (boys)
- Basketball (girls & boys)
- Cross country (girls & boys)
- Football (boys)
  - State champion - 1979, 2013, 2017
- Golf (girls & boys)
  - State champion 1990
- Gymnastics (girls)
  - State champion - 1990
- Soccer (girls & boys)
- Softball (girls)
- Swimming (girls & boys)
  - Girls state champion - 1983
- Tennis (girls & boys)
- Track (girls & boys)
- Volleyball (girls)
- Wrestling (boys)

== Notable alumni ==
- Stevie Brown, former NFL Cornerback
- Harry Crider, former NFL player
- Peyton Gray, MLB player
- Blair Kiel, former NFL player
- Jill Tasker, actress

== See also ==
- List of high schools in Indiana
