= Batesville High School (Indiana) =

Location
- 1 Bulldog Blvd; Batesville, Indiana 47006; United States
- 39.310942°N 85.234165°W

Information
- Type: Public high school
- Motto: "Believe In Better"
- Established: 1875
- School district: Batesville Community School Corporation
- Principal: Andy Allen
- Teaching staff: 46.33 (FTE)
- Grades: 9 – 12
- Enrollment: 671 (2023–2024)
- Student to teacher ratio: 14.48
- Colors: Royal blue and white
- Athletics conference: Eastern Indiana Athletic Conference
- Team name: Bulldogs
- Website: Official website

Batesville High School (BHS) is a public high school in Batesville, Indiana. The high school is part of the Batesville Community School Corporation and has an enrollment of 715.

== History ==
1875 marked the erection of the Batesville schoolhouse which was a two-story, four room brick building. To keep up with the increasing population there was an addition made to the schoolhouse in 1888, and in 1896 a second schoolhouse was built. As the town continued to grow it became apparent that a separate high school was needed. Batesville High School was constructed in 1927 on a large plot of land donated to the Batesville school system by George M. Hillenbrand. In 1963, the Batesville schools consolidated with the schools of Hamburg, St. Mary's and Oldenburg, which marks the beginning of the Batesville Community School Corporation. Due to the rapid growth of the school district from the consolidation it became necessary to build a new high school. Construction on the new high school finished in the fall of 1968, and still serves as the home to Batesville High School. Growing enrollment in the district has resulted in a $12 million addition to the school in 2000 and a $10 million addition in 2017.

== Athletics ==
Batesville High School is a member of the Eastern Indiana Athletic Conference. The Bulldogs compete in 19 Indiana High School Athletic Association sanctioned sports.

Boys

- Baseball
- Basketball
- Cross country
- Football
- Golf
- Soccer
- Swimming
- Tennis
- Track and field
- Wrestling
- Dance
- Marching Band

Girls

- Basketball
- Cross country
- Golf
- Soccer
- Softball
- Swimming
- Tennis
- Track and field
- Volleyball
- Dance
- Marching Band

== Notable alumni ==
- Curt Clawson, member of the U.S. House of Representatives from Florida's 19th congressional district
- Chris Giesting, member of 2016 IAAF World Indoor Championships Gold medal-winning 4 × 400 m relay team and 2012 NCAA Men's Division I Indoor Track and Field Championships distance medley national champion.
- Bryan Hoeing, pitcher for the Miami Marlins.
- Bryan Hutson, musician, the Kingsmen

== See also ==
- List of high schools in Indiana
