= Brownstown Central High School =

School in Brownstown, Indiana, United States

Location
- 500 N Elm St; Brownstown, Jackson County, Indiana 47220; United States; 38.885883°N 86.045723°W

Information
- Type: Public high school
- Established: 1909
- School district: Brownstown Central Community School Corporation
- Superintendent: Tim Taylor
- Principal: Joe Sheffer
- Teaching staff: 32.33 (FTE)
- Grades: 9-12
- Enrollment: 469 (2023-2024)
- Student to teacher ratio: 14.51
- Color
- Athletics conference: Mid-Southern
- Team name: Braves
- Rivals: Seymour High School
- Website: Official Website

Brownstown Central High School is a public high school located in Brownstown, Indiana.

== Athletics ==
The Braves are part of the 10-school Mid-Southern Conference. They have won two state championships.

IHSAA State Championships
Sport	Year(s)
Boys Basketball (1)	2024 (2A)
Girls Volleyball (1)	2020 (3A)

== See also ==
- List of high schools in Indiana
