= Austin High School (Indiana) =

Location
- 401 South Highway 31; Austin, Scott County, Indiana 47102; United States
- Coordinates: 38.739941°N 85.800634°W

Information
- Type: Public high school
- Established: 1914
- Principal: Ryan Herald
- Teaching staff: 21.50 (FTE)
- Grades: 9-12
- Enrollment: 407 (2023–2024)
- Student to teacher ratio: 18.93
- Color
- Athletics conference: Mid-Southern Conference of Indiana
- Team name: Eagles
- Website: Official website

Austin High School is a public high school located in Austin, Indiana.

== Athletics ==
Austin High School's athletic teams are the Eagles, and they compete in the Mid-Southern Conference of Indiana. The school offers a wide range of athletics including:

- Cross country running (men's and women's)
- Volleyball
- Soccer
- Tennis (men's and women's)
- Golf (men's and women's)
- Basketball (men's and women's)
- Baseball
- Softball
- Track and field (men's and women's)

=== Basketball ===
The 2009-2010 Lady Eagles basketball team won the IHSAA 2A Women's Basketball State Championship beating Bishop Luers High School (70–65). To date, it is the only athletic state championship in school history.

== See also ==
- List of high schools in Indiana
