= South Ripley High School =

Location
- 1589 South Benham Road; Versailles, Ripley County, Indiana 47042-8412; United States; 39°3′6″N 85°15′0″W

Information
- Type: Public high school
- School district: South Ripley Community School Corporation
- Principal: Derik Hutton
- Teaching staff: 21.50 (FTE)
- Grades: 9-12
- Enrollment: 358 (2024-2025)
- Student to teacher ratio: 16.65
- Color
- Athletics conference: Ohio River Valley Conference
- Nickname: Raiders/Lady Raiders
- Rival: Jac-Cen-Del Junior-Senior High School
- Website: www.sripley.k12.in.us

South Ripley High School is a public high school located just southeast of Versailles, Indiana (USA). It is part of the South Ripley Community School Corporation which covers four townships: Brown, Johnson, Otter Creek and Shelby in southern Ripley County. In 1966, four smaller high schools in Cross Plains, Holton, New Marion and Versailles consolidated to form South Ripley High School.

== Demographics ==
The demographic breakdown of the 365 students enrolled for the 2012–2013 school year was:

- Male - 52.9%
- Female - 47.1%
- Native American/Alaskan - 0.0%
- Asian/Pacific islander - 0.3%
- Black - 0.0%
- Hispanic - 1.0%
- White - 98.4%
- Multiracial - 0.3%

Additionally, 41.1% of the students were eligible for free or reduced lunches.

== Athletics ==
The South Ripley Raiders compete in the Ohio River Valley Conference. The following IHSAA sanctioned sports are offered:

- Baseball (boys)
- Basketball (girls & boys)
- Cross country (girls & boys)
- Golf (girls & boys)
- Soccer (girls & boys)
- Softball (girls)
- Swimming (girls & boys)
- Track (girls & boys)
- Volleyball (girls)

== See also ==
- List of high schools in Indiana
