= Jac-Cen-Del Junior-Senior High School =

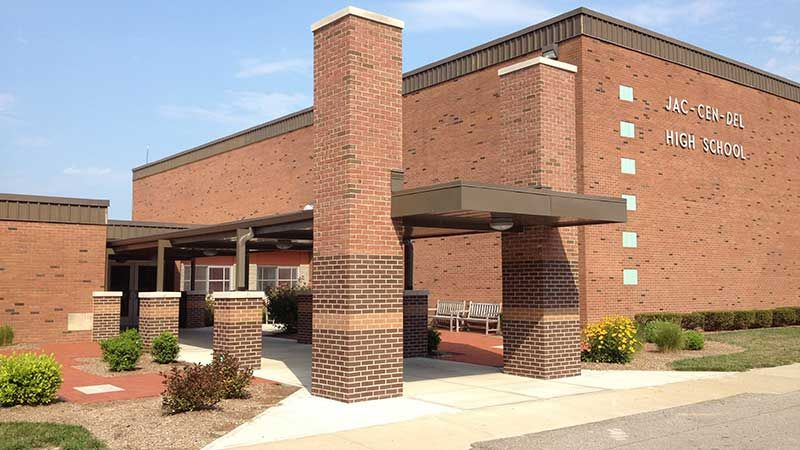

Location
- 4586 North US 421; Osgood, Ripley County, Indiana 47037; United States
- 39.1421°N 85.2952°W

Information
- Type: Public high school
- Motto: Every Child, Every Chance, Every Day
- School district: Jac-Cen-Del Community School Corporation
- Superintendent: Sam Melton
- Principal: Frederick Unsicker
- Faculty: 25.00 FTE
- Grades: 7–12
- Enrollment: 384 (2023-24)
- Colors: Light blue, red, & white
- Song: Indiana, Our Indiana
- Athletics conference: Ohio River Valley Conference
- Team name: Eagles
- Newspaper: The Talon
- Website: Official Website

Jac-Cen-Del Junior-Senior High School is a public high school located in Osgood, Indiana.

== Academics ==
Jac-Cen-Del Jr.-Sr. High School offers many courses for students to take during such as Common Core classes. Jac-Cen-Del also offers courses such as engineering, art, band, computer science, anatomy, and sports training.

== Athletics ==
Jac-Cen-Del Junior-Senior High School's athletic teams are the Eagles and they compete in the Ohio River Valley Conference. The school offers a wide range of athletics including:

- Baseball
- Basketball (boys' and girls')
- Cross country
- Golf (boys' and girls')
- Soccer
- Softball
- Track and field
- Volleyball

=== Soccer ===
The 2019 boys' soccer team reached semi-state in the Class 1A State Championship. They lost against Indy Lutheran 1–0 at Seymour. Their record was 16–2–2. That's the best performance in this school.

=== Basketball ===
The 2015–16 girls' basketball team went 27–1 during the regular season and won the Class 1A State Championship (57–39) against Argos High School on February 27, 2016. Also, the Eagles for the boys won the 2009 Class 1A State Championship

== Extracurricular activities ==
Jac-Cen-Del provides after school activities as the following:

- Chess Club
- Sports
- Tutoring

The Indiana Academic Team also participates at Jac-Cen-Del, allowing students to join a variety of teams such as, English/language arts, math, science, social studies, and fine arts added on for the High School Division.

== See also ==
- List of high schools in Indiana
