= Rising Sun High School (Indiana) =

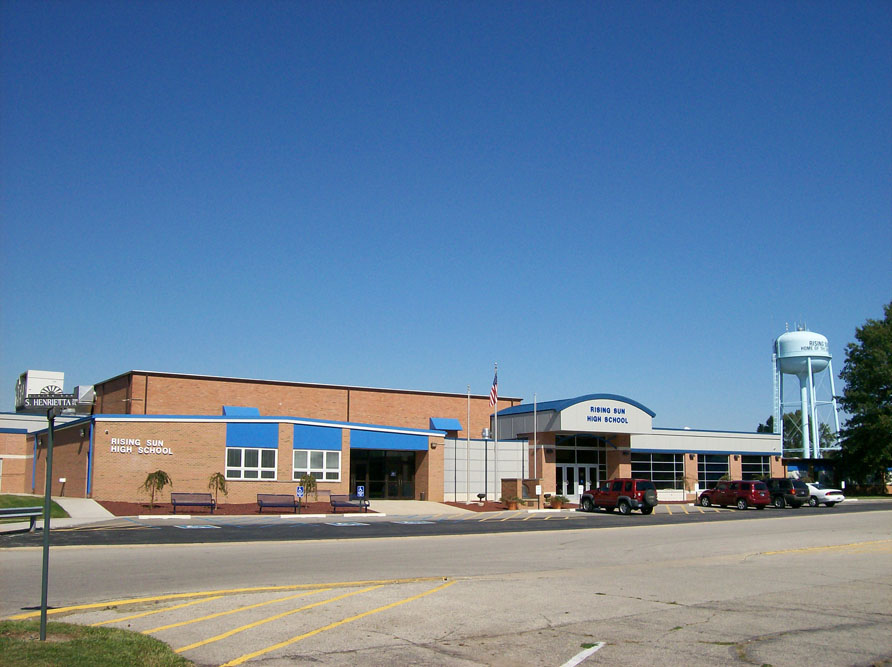
- Rising Sun High School

Location
- 120 South Henrietta Street; Rising Sun, Ohio County, Indiana; United States; 38°57′00″N 84°51′36″W

Information
- Type: Public high school
- School district: Rising Sun-Ohio County Community Schools
- Principal: Noel Bostic
- Teaching staff: 17.33 (FTE)
- Grades: 9-12
- Enrollment: 235 (2024-2025)
- Student to teacher ratio: 13.56
- Color
- Athletics conference: Ohio River Valley Conference
- Team name: Shiners
- Website: Official Website

Rising Sun High School is a public high school in Rising Sun, Indiana. It is part of Rising Sun-Ohio County Community Schools and is the only high school in Ohio County.

== Athletics ==
The nickname is the Shiners, and the athletic teams compete in the Ohio River Valley Conference. The school has achieved some interscholastic success, as the Girls' Basketball team was the Class A runner-up in the state in 2000, and the Shiner Pride marching band reached the ISSMA Class D state finals in 1997 and 1998. The band also reached finals in the MSBA(Mid-States Band Association) in 2009. The Rising Sun Shiner Pride Marching Band placed 8th in Finals at the Mid States Band Association Finals in 2011 with their show entitled "Games People Play." In 2012 they placed 5th with their show entitled "It's a Jazz Thing." Rising Sun High School has no football team.

== See also ==
- List of high schools in Indiana
