= East Central High School (Indiana) =

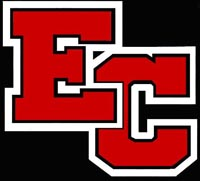

Location
- 1 Trojan Place; St. Leon, Dearborn County, Indiana 47012; United States; 39.279246°N 84.974053°W

Information
- Other name: ECHS
- Type: Public high school
- Established: 1973
- School district: Sunman-Dearborn Community Schools Corporation
- Principal: Jamie Rosfeld
- Teaching staff: 68.90 (on an FTE basis)
- Grades: 9-12
- Enrollment: 1,225 (2024–2025)
- Student to teacher ratio: 17.78
- Colors: Red, black and white
- Team name: Trojans
- Website: echs.sunmandearborn.k12.in.us

East Central High School is the sole high school of the Sunman-Dearborn Community School Corporation, located in St. Leon, Indiana, in the United States. The school serves students from the northern portion of Dearborn County.

== History ==
The school was established in 1973 after a series of consolidative actions between Guilford, Sunman, Bright, and North Dearborn High Schools. These schools existed for varying lengths starting in the first decade of the century.

== About ==
The school serves approximately 1300 students in grades 9–12, with a 21.8:1 student-to-teacher ratio, an approximately equal balance of male and female students, and less than 3% non-White students.

The campus includes numerous classrooms and computer labs, a 1,500-seat Performing Arts Center, a field house, and comprehensive athletic facilities. Students in grades 9–12 are served by three guidance counselors and are assigned to counselors alphabetically by last name. Students in grades 11 and 12 are eligible to attend the Southeastern Career Center in order to pursue a career/technical program.

The curriculum offered by East Central High School includes 59 core curriculum classes, 90 elective classes, 62 career/technical courses, 15 Advanced Placement courses, and 15 dual credit courses for a total of 50 college credits. Students can earn dual college credits from Indiana University and Ivy Tech Community College; participate and test with the College Board for AP courses, and earn workplace certifications in over 36 areas.

Over 80% of the graduates achieve an Academic Honors Diploma, Technical Honors Diploma, or Core 40 diploma. Additionally, 80% of the graduates pursue post-secondary education and training and 5% enlist in the military.

ECHS has over 50% of its students participating in one or more extracurricular activities. The facility offers over 35 extracurricular clubs.

== Awards ==
- 18 Lilly Endowment Scholarship Winners
- 28 EIAC All-Sports Championships
- 1 WCPO Student of the Week
- 2 National FCCLA Officers
- "A" Letter Grade, Indiana Department of Education, 2012–2016
- Top 1,900 Schools, The Washington Post, 2011

== Athletics ==
Nearly one-third of the student body participates in one or more of the 20 varsity sports offered at ECHS. East Central is a member of the Eastern Indiana Athletic Conference (EIAC), and has won 28 all sports championships. Sports include football, soccer, cross country, tennis, basketball, swimming, wrestling, baseball, softball, track, golf, volleyball, and cheerleading.

East Central participates in the Eastern Indiana Athletic Conference. The school is the largest in the conference, participating at the 4A classification at all sports in the IHSAA. Due to its size and proximity to Interstate 74, the Trojans regularly compete against schools in the Cincinnati area.

- Baseball (boys)
- Basketball (girls & boys)
- Cross country (girls & boys)
- Football (boys)
  - State champion - 1994, 2017, 2022, 2023
- Golf (girls & boys)
- Soccer (girls & boys)
- Softball (girls)
- Swimming (girls & boys)
- Tennis (girls & boys)
- Track (girls & boys)
- Volleyball (girls)
- Wrestling (boys)

== Notable alumni ==
- Nick Goepper, Olympic skier
- Jim Lyttle, Major League Baseball player

== See also ==
- List of high schools in Indiana
- Eastern Indiana Athletic Conference
- St. Leon, Indiana
