= South Dearborn High School =

Location
- 5770 Highlander Drive; Aurora, Dearborn County, Indiana 47001; United States
- 39.063761°N 84.928836°W

Information
- Type: Public high school
- School district: South Dearborn Community School Corporation
- Superintendent: Ronald Ross
- Principal: Steve Ohlhaut
- Teaching staff: 44.50 (on an FTE basis)
- Grades: 9-12
- Enrollment: 645 (2023-2024)
- Student to teacher ratio: 14.49
- Color
- Team name: Knights
- Website: https://www.sdcsc.k12.in.us/

South Dearborn High School is the sole high school in the South Dearborn Community School Corporation. It is located in Aurora, Indiana. South Dearborn High School is ranked 310-374th within Indiana. The total minority enrollment is 4%, and 37% of students are economically disadvantaged.

== See also ==
- List of high schools in Indiana
- Eastern Indiana Athletic Conference
- Aurora, Indiana
