= Indiana's 5th congressional district =

U.S. House district for Indiana

Coordinates: 40°N 86°W

- Interactive map of district boundaries since January 3, 2023
- Representative: Victoria Spartz; R–Noblesville
- Area: 3,266.14 mi^{2} (8,459.3 km^{2})
- Distribution: 74.53% urban; 25.47% rural
- Population (2025): 798,967
- Median household income: $85,357
- Ethnicity: 81.1% White; 5.8% Black; 4.6% Hispanic; 4.2% Two or more races; 3.6% Asian; 0.6% other
- Cook PVI: R+8

Indiana's 5th congressional district is a congressional district in the U.S. state of Indiana comprising Hamilton, Madison, Delaware, Grant, and Tipton counties, as well as the large majority of Howard County. Much of its population is located in the northern suburbs of Indianapolis, including the cities of Carmel, Noblesville, and Fishers, while other population centers include Muncie, Kokomo, Anderson, and Marion. The district is predominantly white and is the wealthiest congressional district in Indiana, as measured by median income.

The district is currently represented by Republican Victoria Spartz who lost the 2026 general election to Democrat J. D. Ford.

== Demographics ==
According to the APM Research Lab's Voter Profile Tools (featuring the U.S. Census Bureau's 2019 American Community Survey), the district contained about 585,000 potential voters (citizens, age 18+). Of these, 84% are White and 8% are Black. Immigrants make up 4% of the district's potential voters. Median income among households (with one or more potential voter) in the district is about $76,700, while 7% of households live below the poverty line. As for the educational attainment of potential voters in the district, 45% hold a bachelor's or higher degree.

== Composition ==
For the 118th and successive Congresses (based on redistricting following the 2020 census), the district contains all or portions of the following counties and townships:

Delaware County (12)

All 12 townships

Grant County (13)

All 13 townships

Hamilton County (9)

All nine townships

Howard County (11)

Center, Clay, Ervin, Harrison, Honey Creek (part, also 4th; includes part of Russiaville), Howard, Jackson, Liberty, Monroe, Taylor, Union

Madison County (14)

All 14 townships

Tipton County (6)

All six townships

== Recent election results from statewide races ==
Year	Office	Results
2008	President	McCain 53% - 45%
2012	President	Romney 60% - 40%
2012	Senate	Mourdock 47% - 46%
2012	Governor	Pence 56% - 40%
2016	President	Trump 58% - 35%
2016	Senate	Young 56% - 38%
2016	Governor	Holcomb 55% - 42%
2016	Attorney General	Hill 67% - 33%
2018	Senate	Braun 53% - 43%
2020	President	Trump 57% - 41%
2020	Governor	Holcomb 60% - 29%
2020	Attorney General	Rokita 61% - 39%
2022	Senate	Young 59% - 37%
2022	Treasurer	Elliott 62% - 38%
2022	Auditor	Klutz 61% - 35%
2022	Secretary of State	Morales 52% - 41%
2024	President	Trump 57% - 41%
2024	Senate	Banks 59% - 38%
2024	Governor	Braun 54% - 42%
2024	Attorney General	Rokita 58% - 42%

== List of members representing the district ==
Member	Party	Years	Cong ress	Electoral history	District location
District created March 4, 1833
Johnathan McCarty (Fort Wayne)	Jacksonian	March 4, 1833 – March 3, 1835	23rd 24th	Redistricted from the 3rd district and re-elected in 1833. Re-elected in 1835. Lost re-election.	1833–1843 [data missing]
Johnathan McCarty (Fort Wayne)	Anti-Jacksonian	March 4, 1835 – March 3, 1837	23rd 24th	Redistricted from the 3rd district and re-elected in 1833. Re-elected in 1835. Lost re-election.	1833–1843 [data missing]
James Rariden (Centerville)	Whig	March 4, 1837 – March 3, 1841	25th 26th	Elected in 1837. Re-elected in 1839. Retired.	1833–1843 [data missing]
Andrew Kennedy (Muncietown)	Democratic	March 4, 1841 – March 3, 1843	27th	Elected in 1841. Redistricted to the 10th district.	1833–1843 [data missing]
William J. Brown (Indianapolis)	Democratic	March 4, 1843 – March 3, 1845	28th	Elected in 1843. Retired.	1843–1853 [data missing]
William W. Wick (Indianapolis)	Democratic	March 4, 1845 – March 3, 1849	29th 30th	Elected in 1845. Re-elected in 1847. Retired.	1843–1853 [data missing]
William J. Brown (Indianapolis)	Democratic	March 4, 1849 – March 3, 1851	31st	Elected in 1849. Lost renomination.	1843–1853 [data missing]
Thomas A. Hendricks (Shelbyville)	Democratic	March 4, 1851 – March 3, 1853	32nd	Elected in 1851. Redistricted to the 6th district.	1843–1853 [data missing]
Samuel W. Parker (Connersville)	Whig	March 4, 1853 – March 3, 1855	33rd	Redistricted from the 4th district and re-elected in 1852. Retired.	1853–1863 [data missing]
David P. Holloway (Richmond)	People's	March 4, 1855 – March 3, 1857	34th	Elected in 1854. Retired.	1853–1863 [data missing]
David Kilgore (Muncie)	Republican	March 4, 1857 – March 3, 1861	35th 36th	Elected in 1856. Re-elected in 1858. Retired.	1853–1863 [data missing]
George W. Julian (Centerville)	Republican	March 4, 1861 – March 3, 1869	37th 38th 39th 40th	Elected in 1860. Re-elected in 1862. Re-elected in 1864. Re-elected in 1866. Redistricted to the 4th district.	1853–1863 [data missing]
George W. Julian (Centerville)	Republican	March 4, 1861 – March 3, 1869	37th 38th 39th 40th	Elected in 1860. Re-elected in 1862. Re-elected in 1864. Re-elected in 1866. Redistricted to the 4th district.	1863–1873 [data missing]
John Coburn (Indianapolis)	Republican	March 4, 1869 – March 3, 1875	41st 42nd 43rd	Redistricted from the 6th district and re-elected in 1868. Re-elected in 1870. Re-elected in 1872. Redistricted to the 7th district and lost re-election.	1863–1873 [data missing]
John Coburn (Indianapolis)	Republican	March 4, 1869 – March 3, 1875	41st 42nd 43rd	Redistricted from the 6th district and re-elected in 1868. Re-elected in 1870. Re-elected in 1872. Redistricted to the 7th district and lost re-election.	1873–1883 [data missing]
William S. Holman (Aurora)	Democratic	March 4, 1875 – March 3, 1877	44th	Redistricted from the 3rd district and re-elected in 1874. Lost re-election.	1873–1883 [data missing]
Thomas M. Browne (Winchester)	Republican	March 4, 1877 – March 3, 1881	45th 46th	Elected in 1876. Re-elected in 1878. Redistricted to the 6th district.	1873–1883 [data missing]
Courtland C. Matson (Greencastle)	Democratic	March 4, 1881 – March 3, 1889	47th 48th 49th 50th	Elected in 1880. Re-elected in 1882. Re-elected in 1884. Re-elected in 1886. Retired to run for Governor of Indiana.	1873–1883 [data missing]
Courtland C. Matson (Greencastle)	Democratic	March 4, 1881 – March 3, 1889	47th 48th 49th 50th	Elected in 1880. Re-elected in 1882. Re-elected in 1884. Re-elected in 1886. Retired to run for Governor of Indiana.	1883–1893 [data missing]
George W. Cooper (Columbus)	Democratic	March 4, 1889 – March 3, 1895	51st 52nd 53rd	Elected in 1888. Re-elected in 1890. Re-elected in 1892. Lost re-election.	1883–1893 [data missing]
George W. Cooper (Columbus)	Democratic	March 4, 1889 – March 3, 1895	51st 52nd 53rd	Elected in 1888. Re-elected in 1890. Re-elected in 1892. Lost re-election.	1893–1903 [data missing]
Jesse Overstreet (Franklin)	Republican	March 4, 1895 – March 3, 1897	54th	Elected in 1894. Redistricted to the 7th district.	1893–1903 [data missing]
George W. Faris (Terre Haute)	Republican	March 4, 1897 – March 3, 1901	55th 56th	Redistricted from the 8th district and re-elected in 1896. Re-elected in 1898. Retired.	1893–1903 [data missing]
Elias S. Holliday (Brazil)	Republican	March 4, 1901 – March 3, 1909	57th 58th 59th 60th	Elected in 1900. Re-elected in 1902. Re-elected in 1904. Re-elected in 1906. Retired.	1893–1903 [data missing]
Elias S. Holliday (Brazil)	Republican	March 4, 1901 – March 3, 1909	57th 58th 59th 60th	Elected in 1900. Re-elected in 1902. Re-elected in 1904. Re-elected in 1906. Retired.	1903–1913 [data missing]
Ralph Wilbur Moss (Center Point)	Democratic	March 4, 1909 – March 3, 1917	61st 62nd 63rd 64th	Elected in 1908. Re-elected in 1910. Re-elected in 1912. Re-elected in 1914. Lost re-election.	1903–1913 [data missing]
Ralph Wilbur Moss (Center Point)	Democratic	March 4, 1909 – March 3, 1917	61st 62nd 63rd 64th	Elected in 1908. Re-elected in 1910. Re-elected in 1912. Re-elected in 1914. Lost re-election.	1913–1933 [data missing]
Everett Sanders (Terre Haute)	Republican	March 4, 1917 – March 3, 1925	65th 66th 67th 68th	Elected in 1916. Re-elected in 1918. Re-elected in 1920. Re-elected in 1922. Retired.	1913–1933 [data missing]
Noble J. Johnson (Terre Haute)	Republican	March 4, 1925 – March 3, 1931	69th 70th 71st	Elected in 1924. Re-elected in 1926. Re-elected in 1928. Lost re-election.	1913–1933 [data missing]
Courtland C. Gillen (Greencastle)	Democratic	March 4, 1931 – March 3, 1933	72nd	Elected in 1930. Lost renomination.	1913–1933 [data missing]
Glenn Griswold (Peru)	Democratic	March 4, 1933 – January 3, 1939	73rd 74th 75th	Redistricted from the 11th district and re-elected in 1932. Re-elected in 1934. Re-elected in 1936. Lost re-election.	1933–1943 [data missing]
Forest Harness (Kokomo)	Republican	January 3, 1939 – January 3, 1949	76th 77th 78th 79th 80th	Elected in 1938. Re-elected in 1940. Re-elected in 1942. Re-elected in 1944. Re-elected in 1946. Lost re-election.	1933–1943 [data missing]
Forest Harness (Kokomo)	Republican	January 3, 1939 – January 3, 1949	76th 77th 78th 79th 80th	Elected in 1938. Re-elected in 1940. Re-elected in 1942. Re-elected in 1944. Re-elected in 1946. Lost re-election.	1943–1953 [data missing]
John R. Walsh (Anderson)	Democratic	January 3, 1949 – January 3, 1951	81st	Elected in 1948. Lost re-election.	1943–1953 [data missing]
John V. Beamer (Wabash)	Republican	January 3, 1951 – January 3, 1959	82nd 83rd 84th 85th	Elected in 1950. Re-elected in 1952. Re-elected in 1954. Re-elected in 1956. Lost re-election.	1943–1953 [data missing]
John V. Beamer (Wabash)	Republican	January 3, 1951 – January 3, 1959	82nd 83rd 84th 85th	Elected in 1950. Re-elected in 1952. Re-elected in 1954. Re-elected in 1956. Lost re-election.	1953–1963 [data missing]
J. Edward Roush (Huntington)	Democratic	January 3, 1959 – January 3, 1961	86th	Elected in 1958. Seat vacant until election challenge resolved.	1953–1963 [data missing]
Vacant		January 3, 1961 – June 14, 1961	87th		1953–1963 [data missing]
J. Edward Roush (Huntington)	Democratic	June 14, 1961 – January 3, 1969	87th 88th 89th 90th	Re-elected in 1960. Re-elected in 1962. Re-elected in 1964. Re-elected in 1966. Redistricted to the 4th district and lost re-election.	1953–1963 [data missing]
J. Edward Roush (Huntington)	Democratic	June 14, 1961 – January 3, 1969	87th 88th 89th 90th	Re-elected in 1960. Re-elected in 1962. Re-elected in 1964. Re-elected in 1966. Redistricted to the 4th district and lost re-election.	1963–1973 [data missing]
Richard L. Roudebush (Noblesville)	Republican	January 3, 1969 – January 3, 1971	91st	Redistricted from the 10th district and re-elected in 1968. Retired to run for U.S. senator.	1963–1973 [data missing]
Elwood Hillis (Kokomo)	Republican	January 3, 1971 – January 3, 1987	92nd 93rd 94th 95th 96th 97th 98th 99th	Elected in 1970. Re-elected in 1972. Re-elected in 1974. Re-elected in 1976. Re-elected in 1978. Re-elected in 1980. Re-elected in 1982. Re-elected in 1984. Retired.	1963–1973 [data missing]
Elwood Hillis (Kokomo)	Republican	January 3, 1971 – January 3, 1987	92nd 93rd 94th 95th 96th 97th 98th 99th	Elected in 1970. Re-elected in 1972. Re-elected in 1974. Re-elected in 1976. Re-elected in 1978. Re-elected in 1980. Re-elected in 1982. Re-elected in 1984. Retired.	1973–1983 [data missing]
Elwood Hillis (Kokomo)	Republican	January 3, 1971 – January 3, 1987	92nd 93rd 94th 95th 96th 97th 98th 99th	Elected in 1970. Re-elected in 1972. Re-elected in 1974. Re-elected in 1976. Re-elected in 1978. Re-elected in 1980. Re-elected in 1982. Re-elected in 1984. Retired.	1983–2003
Jim Jontz (Monticello)	Democratic	January 3, 1987 – January 3, 1993	100th 101st 102nd	Elected in 1986. Re-elected in 1988. Re-elected in 1990. Lost re-election.	1983–2003
Steve Buyer (Monticello)	Republican	January 3, 1993 – January 3, 2003	103rd 104th 105th 106th 107th	Elected in 1992. Re-elected in 1994. Re-elected in 1996. Re-elected in 1998. Re-elected in 2000. Redistricted to the 4th district.	1983–2003
Dan Burton (Indianapolis)	Republican	January 3, 2003 – January 3, 2013	108th 109th 110th 111th 112th	Redistricted from the 6th district and re-elected in 2002. Re-elected in 2004. Re-elected in 2006. Re-elected in 2008. Re-elected in 2010. Retired.	2003–2013
Susan Brooks (Carmel)	Republican	January 3, 2013 – January 3, 2021	113th 114th 115th 116th	Elected in 2012. Re-elected in 2014. Re-elected in 2016. Re-elected in 2018. Retired.	2013–2023
Victoria Spartz (Noblesville)	Republican	January 3, 2021 – present	117th 118th 119th	Elected in 2020. Re-elected in 2022. Re-elected in 2024. Lost re-election	2013–2023
Victoria Spartz (Noblesville)	Republican	January 3, 2021 – present	117th 118th 119th	Elected in 2020. Re-elected in 2022. Re-elected in 2024. Lost re-election	2023–present
J. D. Ford (Carmel)	Democratic	Assuming office on January 3, 2027		Elected in 2026.	2023–present

== Election results ==
=== 2002 ===
Indiana's 5th Congressional District election (2002)
Party	Candidate	Votes	%
Republican	Dan Burton*	129,442	71.97
Democratic	Katherine Fox Carr	45,283	25.18
Libertarian	Christopher Adkins	5,130	2.85
Total votes		179,855	100.00
Turnout			
Republican hold			

=== 2004 ===
Indiana's 5th Congressional District election (2004)
Party	Candidate	Votes	%
Republican	Dan Burton*	228,718	71.84
Democratic	Katherine Fox Carr	82,637	25.96
Libertarian	Rick Hodgin	7,008	2.20
Total votes		318,363	100.00
Turnout			
Republican hold			

=== 2006 ===
Indiana's 5th Congressional District election (2006)
Party	Candidate	Votes	%
Republican	Dan Burton*	133,118	64.96
Democratic	Katherine Fox Carr	64,362	31.41
Libertarian	Sheri Conover Sharlow	7,431	3.63
Total votes		204,821	100.00
Turnout			
Republican hold			

=== 2008 ===
Indiana's 5th Congressional District election (2008)
Party	Candidate	Votes	%
Republican	Dan Burton*	234,507	65.59
Democratic	Mary Etta Ruley	123,021	34.41
Total votes		357,528	100.00
Turnout			
Republican hold			

=== 2010 ===
Indiana's 5th Congressional District election (2010)
Party	Candidate	Votes	%
Republican	Dan Burton*	146,899	62.14
Democratic	Tim Crawford	60,024	25.39
Libertarian	Richard Reid	18,266	7.73
Independent	Jesse C. Trueblood	11,218	4.75
Total votes		236,407	100.00
Turnout			
Republican hold			

=== 2012 ===
Indiana's 5th Congressional District election (2012)
Party	Candidate	Votes	%
Republican	Susan Brooks	194,570	58.37
Democratic	Scott Reske	125,347	37.60
Libertarian	Chard Reid	13,442	4.03
Total votes		333,359	100.00
Turnout			58
Republican hold			

=== 2014 ===
Indiana's 5th Congressional District election (2014)
Party	Candidate	Votes	%
Republican	Susan Brooks*	105,277	65.21
Democratic	Shawn Denney	49,756	30.82
Libertarian	John Krom	6,407	3.97
Total votes		161,440	100.00
Turnout			26
Republican hold			

=== 2016 ===
Indiana's 5th Congressional District election (2016)
Party	Candidate	Votes	%
Republican	Susan Brooks*	221,957	61.46
Democratic	Angela Demaree	123,849	34.29
Libertarian	Matthew Wittlief	15,329	4.24
Total votes		361,135	100.00
Turnout			57
Republican hold			

=== 2018 ===
Indiana's 5th Congressional District election (2018)
Party	Candidate	Votes	%
Republican	Susan Brooks*	180,035	56.76
Democratic	Dee Thornton	137,142	43.24
Total votes		317,177	100.00
Turnout			
Republican hold			

=== 2020 ===
Indiana's 5th Congressional District election (2020)
Party	Candidate	Votes	%
Republican	Victoria Spartz	208,053	50.0
Democratic	Christina Hale	190,898	45.9
Libertarian	Ken Tucker	16,764	4.0
Total votes		415,718	100.0
Republican hold			

=== 2022 ===
Indiana's 5th Congressional District election (2022)
Party	Candidate	Votes	%
Republican	Victoria Spartz*	146,575	61.1
Democratic	Jeanine Lee Lake	93,434	38.9
Total votes		240,009	100.0
Republican hold			

=== 2024 ===
Indiana's 5th Congressional District election (2024)
Party	Candidate	Votes	%
Republican	Victoria Spartz*	203,293	56.6
Democratic	Deborah Pickett	136,554	38.0
Independent	Robby Slaughter	9,790	2.7
Libertarian	Lauri Shillings	9,567	2.7
Total votes		359,204	100.0
Republican hold			

=== 2026 ===
Indiana's 5th Congressional District election (2026)
Party	Candidate	Votes	%
Democratic	J. D. Ford	134,476	51.7
Republican	Victoria Spartz*	125,851	48.3
Total votes		260,327	100.0
Democratic gain from Republican			

== See also ==
- Indiana's congressional districts
- List of United States congressional districts
