= Western High School (Indiana) =

Location
- 2600 S 600 W Russiaville, Indiana 46979; United States; 40°26′15″N 86°14′31″W

Information
- Type: Public high school
- Motto: Educating, Engaging, and Encouraging Students to Excel
- Established: 1949
- School district: Western School Corp
- Superintendent: Mark DuBois
- School code: 21934
- Principal: Steve Edwards
- Teaching staff: 47.75 (on an FTE basis)
- Enrollment: 795 (2023-2024)
- Student to teacher ratio: 16.65
- Color
- Athletics conference: Hoosier Athletic Conference
- Sports: Soccer, Football, Basketball, Swimming, Golf, Wrestling, Volleyball, Cross Country, Track, Softball, Baseball
- Nickname: Panthers
- Rival: Northwestern, Kokomo
- Newspaper: Western Union
- Yearbook: Echo
- Website: whs.western.k12.in.us

Western High School is a high school located in Russiaville, Indiana. The school is a part of Western School Corporation.

== About ==
Western High School is one of 5 public high schools in Howard County: Kokomo High School, Northwestern High School, Eastern (Greentown) High School, and Taylor High School.

Western was founded in 1949 by combining three smaller school systems into one corporation, Western School Corporation. The New London Quakers, West Middleton Broncos, and Russiaville Cossacks came together and formed the Western Panthers.

== Athletics ==
Western High School is one of the 11 schools associated with the Hoosier Athletic Conference.

Currently, the teams are as follows: Boys- Football, Soccer, Cross Country, Basketball, Wrestling, Swimming, Track and Field, Golf, and Baseball. Girls- Volleyball, Cross Country, Basketball, Swimming, Track and Field, Softball, Golf, and Soccer. In addition, there was a club bowling team added in 2010, however its events do not count towards conference standings since not all of the other schools have a team.

=== Team state championships ===
The following teams have taken IHSAA state championships:

- 2002 - Girls Golf
- 2012 - Baseball (3A)
- 2014 - Girls Basketball (3A)
- 2019 - Wrestling (2A)
- 2023 - Wrestling (2A)
- 2024 - Softball (3A)

== Band program ==
The Western High School Marching Panthers have been ISSMA Class C State Champions in 1982, 1983, 1984, 1985, 1990, 1991, 1996, 2008, 2009, 2010, 2011, 2012, 2014, 2015, 2016, 2019 and 2021 and Class B State Champions in 1988 for a total of 18 State Championships.

== Extracurricular activities ==
Western High School is host to FIRST Robotics Competition Team 292.

== Ryan White incident ==
Western School Corporation gained notoriety for expelling Ryan White in 1984 because of his diagnosis of HIV, a disease that, at the time, was just coming into the national spotlight.

== Notable alumni ==
- Ezra Hendrickson - Former MLS player for the New York Metrostars, Los Angeles Galaxy, Dallas Burn, D.C. United, Chivas USA and Columbus Crew. Hendrickson has also had an accomplished international career playing for the Saint Vincent and the Grenadines national football team.
- Ryan White - Famous AIDS victim
- Krystal Scott (Omegle Cat Killer) - Former student arrested for federal animal cruelty charges after a large internet search.
- Mike Fulk - Former NFL player for the San Francisco 49ers. Fulk also played football in college for the Indiana Hoosiers. In 2024, Fulk was inducted into the Indiana Football Hall of Fame.

== See also ==
- List of high schools in Indiana
