= Judson, Indiana =

- Unincorporated community Census designated place
- Location within Indiana Location within the United States
- Coordinates: 40°30′14″N 86°16′17″W
- Country: United States
- State: Indiana
- County: Howard
- Township: Ervin
- Elevation: 810 ft (250 m)

Population (2006)
  - Total: 61
- ZIP code: 46901
- FIPS code: 18-39060
- GNIS feature ID: 437138

Judson (Also called Poplar Grove) is an unincorporated community in Ervin Township, Howard County, Indiana, United States. It is part of the Kokomo, Indiana Metropolitan Statistical Area.

== Demographics ==
The United States Census Bureau delineated Judson as a census designated place in the 2022 American Community Survey.
