= Indiana State Road 931 =

Highway in Indiana

State Road 931
- SR 931 highlighted in red

Route information
- Maintained by INDOT
- Length: 20.428 mi (32.876 km)
- Existed: 2013–present

Southern segment
- Length: 11.592 mi (18.656 km)
- South end: US 31 south of Kokomo
- Major intersections: SR 26 south of Kokomo; US 35 north of Kokomo
- North end: US 31 north of Kokomo

Northern segment
- Length: 8.836 mi (14.220 km)
- South end: St. Joseph–Marshall county line
- Major intersections: SR 4 near Lakeville
- North end: South Bend city limits c.500 ft (150 m) north of Roosevelt Road

Location
- Country: United States
- State: Indiana

Highway system
- Indiana State Highway System; Interstate; US; State; Scenic
| ← SR 930 | → SR 933 |

State Road 931 (SR 931) is a state road designation assigned to two former sections of US 31 in the U.S. state of Indiana.

== Route description ==
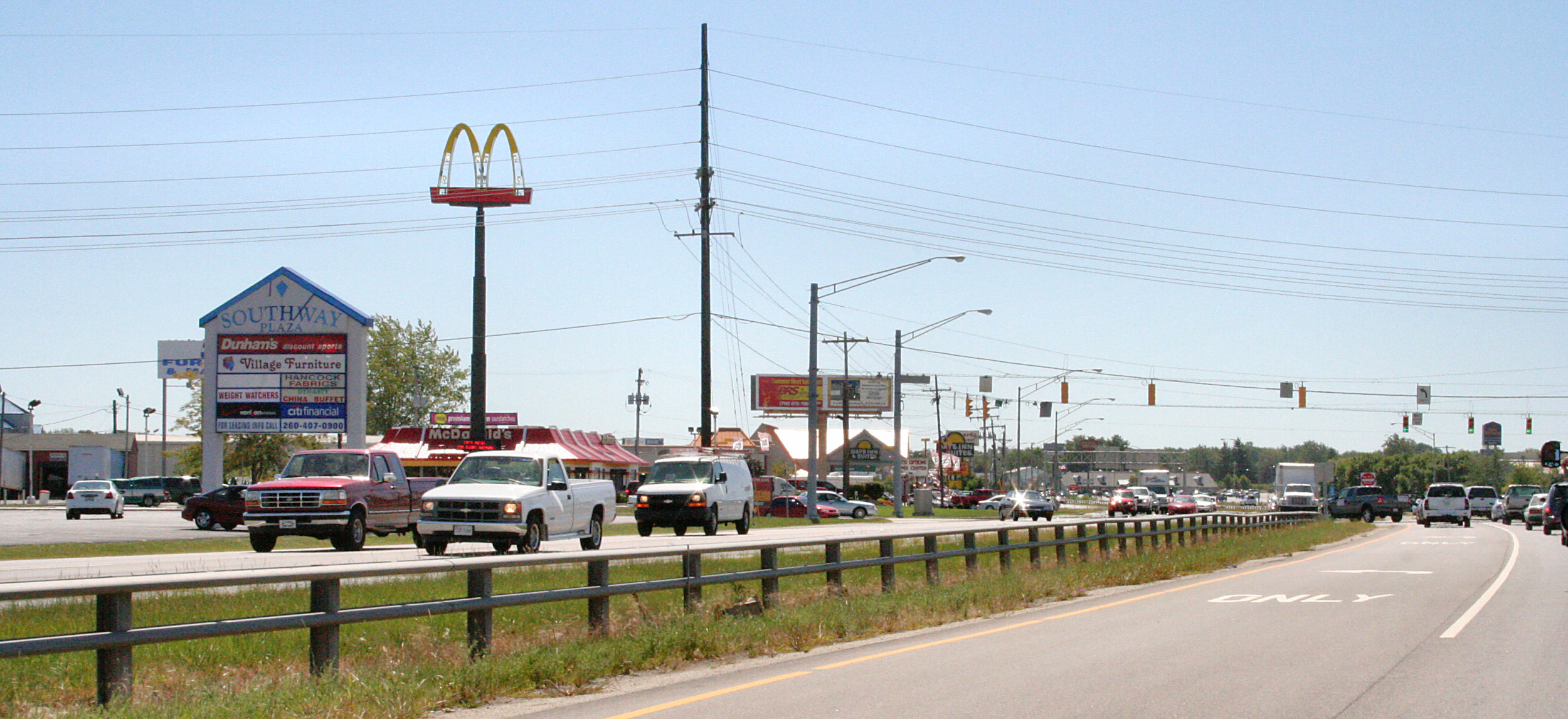
View looking south on a portion of the Kokomo segment in 2005 when it was still designated as part of US 31

=== Southern segment ===
SR 931 begins at an interchange with US 31 south of Kokomo, passing through farmland and residential properties. After crossing SR 26, the road passes through a commercial section of Kokomo. It then returns to US 31 north of Kokomo just after the intersection with US 35.

=== Northern segment ===
SR 931 runs through Lakeville then traverses a rural area briefly before reaching the southern edge of the South Bend urban area at its northern end.

== History ==
=== Southern segment ===
In 2013 US 31 was rerouted onto a new bypass around Kokomo and the designation along the old bypass, built as a relocated US 31 in 1952, became SR 931.

=== Northern segment ===
In 2014 the segment of US 31 freeway from US 30 near Plymouth to US 20 (St. Joseph Valley Parkway) in South Bend opened, and the segment of what had been US 31 in St. Joseph County outside of South Bend became SR 931. This segment had been expected to be removed from the state highway system in mid-2018. The bypassed portion in Marshall County was transferred to the county and to the town of La Paz rather than being retained by the state.

== Major intersections ==
| County | Location | mi | km | Destinations | Notes |
|---|---|---|---|---|---|
| Tipton | Prairie–Liberty township line | 0.000 | 0.000 | US 31 south | Southern terminus |
| Howard | Indian Heights | 2.217 | 3.568 | SR 26 | |
| Howard | Kokomo | 6.502 | 10.464 | Markland Avenue | Formerly SR 22 |
| Howard | Howard–Clay township line | 10.686 | 17.197 | US 35 | |
| Howard | Howard–Clay township line | 11.592 | 18.656 | US 31 north | Northern terminus |
Gap in route
| Marshall–St. Joseph county line | North–Union township line | 11.592 | 18.656 | Michigan Road | Southern terminus |
| St. Joseph | Lakeville | 16.032 | 25.801 | SR 4 | |
| St. Joseph | Centre Township–South Bend line | 20.428 | 32.876 | South Bend | Northern terminus |
1.000 mi = 1.609 km; 1.000 km = 0.621 mi: Incomplete access
