= Taylor Township, Howard County, Indiana =

Taylor Township
- Township
- Location in Howard County
- Coordinates: 40°26′04″N 86°03′07″W
- Country: United States
- State: Indiana
- County: Howard

Government
  - Type: Indiana township

Area
  - Total: 30.4 sq mi (79 km^{2})
  - Land: 30.4 sq mi (79 km^{2})
  - Water: 0 sq mi (0 km^{2}) 0%
- Elevation: 840 ft (256 m)

Population (2020)
  - Total: 9,396
  - Density: 305.7/sq mi (118.0/km^{2})
- GNIS feature ID: 0453891

Taylor Township is one of eleven townships in Howard County, Indiana, United States. As of the 2020 census, its population was 9,396, up from 9,294 in 2010.

== Geography ==
Historical population
Census	Pop.	Note	%±
2000	9,536		—
2010	9,294		−2.5%
2020	9,396		1.1%
U.S. Census

According to the 2010 census, the township has a total area of 30.4 square miles (79 km^{2}), all land. The stream of Taylor Run runs through this township.

=== Cities and towns ===
- Kokomo

=== Unincorporated towns ===
- Center (Tampico)
- Hemlock (Terre Hall)
- Oakford (Fairfield)

(This list is based on USGS data and may include former settlements.)

=== Former Settlements ===
- Indian Heights (Annexed into Kokomo in 2012)
- Guy

=== Adjacent townships ===
- Howard Township (north)
- Liberty Township (northeast)
- Union Township (east)
- Wildcat Township, Tipton County (southeast)
- Liberty Township, Tipton County (south)
- Prairie Township, Tipton County (southwest)
- Harrison Township (west)
- Center Township (northwest)

=== Cemeteries ===
The township contains three cemeteries: Albright, Chandler and Poff.

=== Major highways ===
- US 31
- US 35
- SR 19
- SR 22
- SR 26

== Library ==
- Kokomo-Howard County Public Library South Branch, (SWC) Center and Albright roads

== Schools ==
- Taylor High School
- Taylor Middle School

== Post Offices ==
- Oakford Post Office
