= Center Township, Howard County, Indiana =

Center Township
- Township
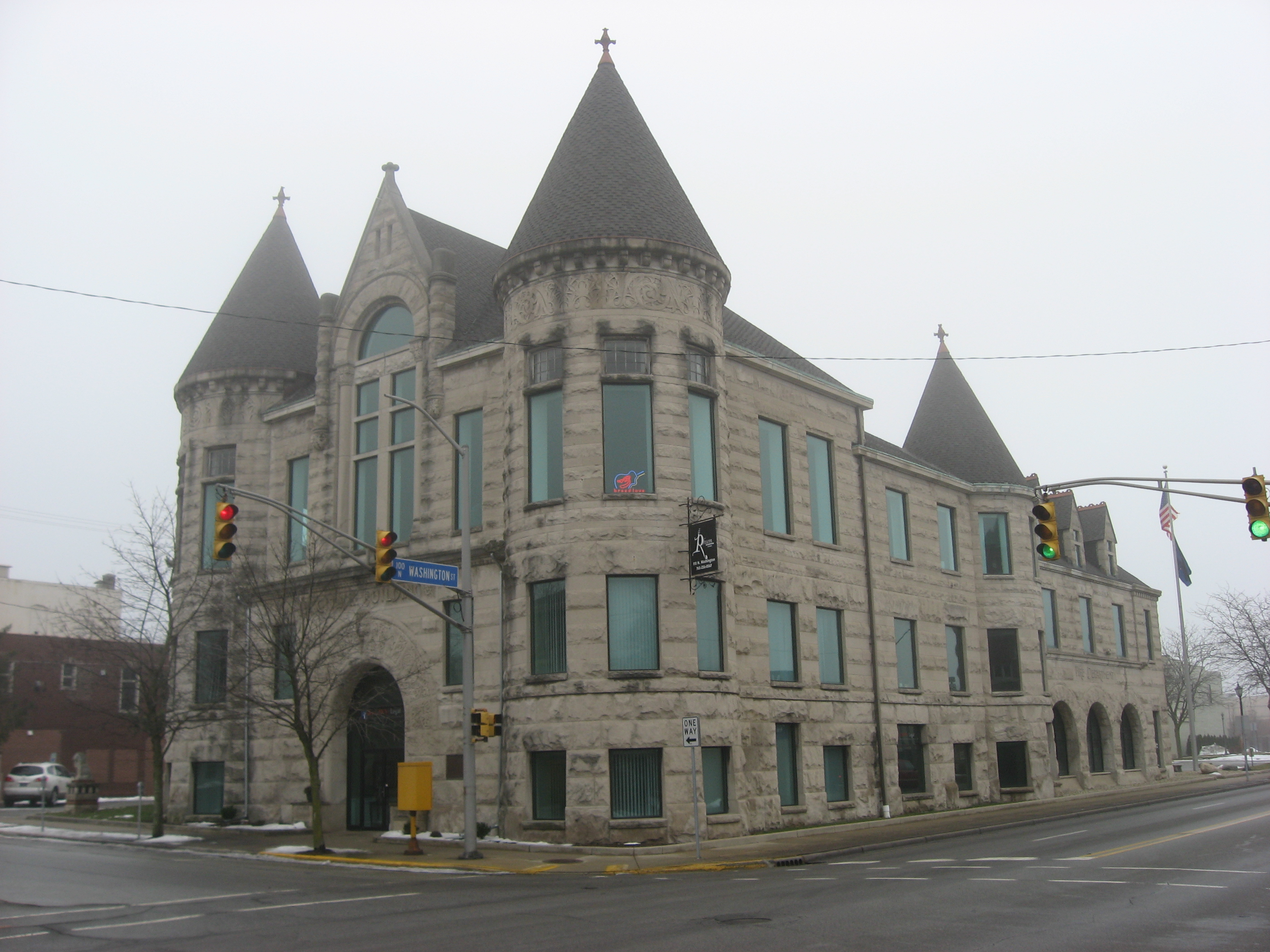
- The former Kokomo City Building, a historic site in Center Township

- Location in Howard County
- Coordinates: 40°29′01″N 86°08′09″W
- Country: United States
- State: Indiana
- County: Howard

Government
  - Type: Indiana township

Area
  - Total: 25.71 sq mi (66.6 km^{2})
  - Land: 25.65 sq mi (66.4 km^{2})
  - Water: 0.06 sq mi (0.16 km^{2}) 0.23%
- Elevation: 790 ft (240 m)

Population (2020)
  - Total: 45,776
  - Density: 1,764.9/sq mi (681.4/km^{2})
- GNIS feature ID: 0453182
- Website: centertownship1.com

Center Township is one of eleven townships in Howard County, Indiana, United States. As of the 2020 census, its population was 45,776, up from 45,275 in 2010.

== History ==
Center Township was named from its position at the geographical center of Howard County.

Townships have been an integral part of Indiana government since the 1857 constitution. Each township elects an executive officer-the trustee, and three legislative officers- members of the township board. Each serve four year terms. Currently, as of 2023, the trustee is Andrew Durham, and the board members are Tom Cleaver Jr, Linda Koontz, and Debra Rahe. .

== Geography ==
=== Cities and towns ===
- Kokomo (vast majority)

=== Unincorporated towns ===
- Darrough Chapel
- Shambaugh Siding

(This list is based on USGS data and may include former settlements.)

=== Adjacent townships ===
- Howard Township (northeast)
- Taylor Township (southeast)
- Harrison Township (southwest)
- Clay Township (northwest)

=== Major highways ===
- US 31
- US 35
- SR 22
- SR 931

== Demographics ==
Historical population
Census	Pop.	Note	%±
2000	47,619		—
2010	45,275		−4.9%
2020	45,776		1.1%

=== 2010 Census ===
According to the 2010 census, the township has a total area of 25.71 square miles (66.6 km^{2}), of which 25.65 square miles (66.4 km^{2}) (or 99.77%) is land and 0.06 square miles (0.16 km^{2}) (or 0.23%) is water.

== Cemeteries ==
The township contains two operational cemeteries: Crown Point and Memorial Park. The township also maintains Puckett Cemetery at the corner of Malfalfa Rd & Sycamore St and a small cemetery at the corner of Berkley Rd and Markland Ave.

== Libraries ==
- Kokomo-Howard County Main Branch Library, in Kokomo

== Schools ==
See main article Kokomo-Center Township Consolidated School Corporation School's outside of the above school district in Center Township include:

=== Colleges ===
- Indiana University Kokomo
- Indiana Wesleyan University Kokomo Campus
- Ivy Tech Community College
- Purdue College of Technology

=== Private Schools ===
There is also 5 private schools in Center Township
