= Honey Creek Township, Indiana =

Honey Creek Township is the name of three townships in the U.S. state of Indiana:

- Honey Creek Township, Howard County, Indiana
- Honey Creek Township, Vigo County, Indiana
- Honey Creek Township, White County, Indiana
