= Harrison Township, Howard County, Indiana =

Harrison Township
- Township
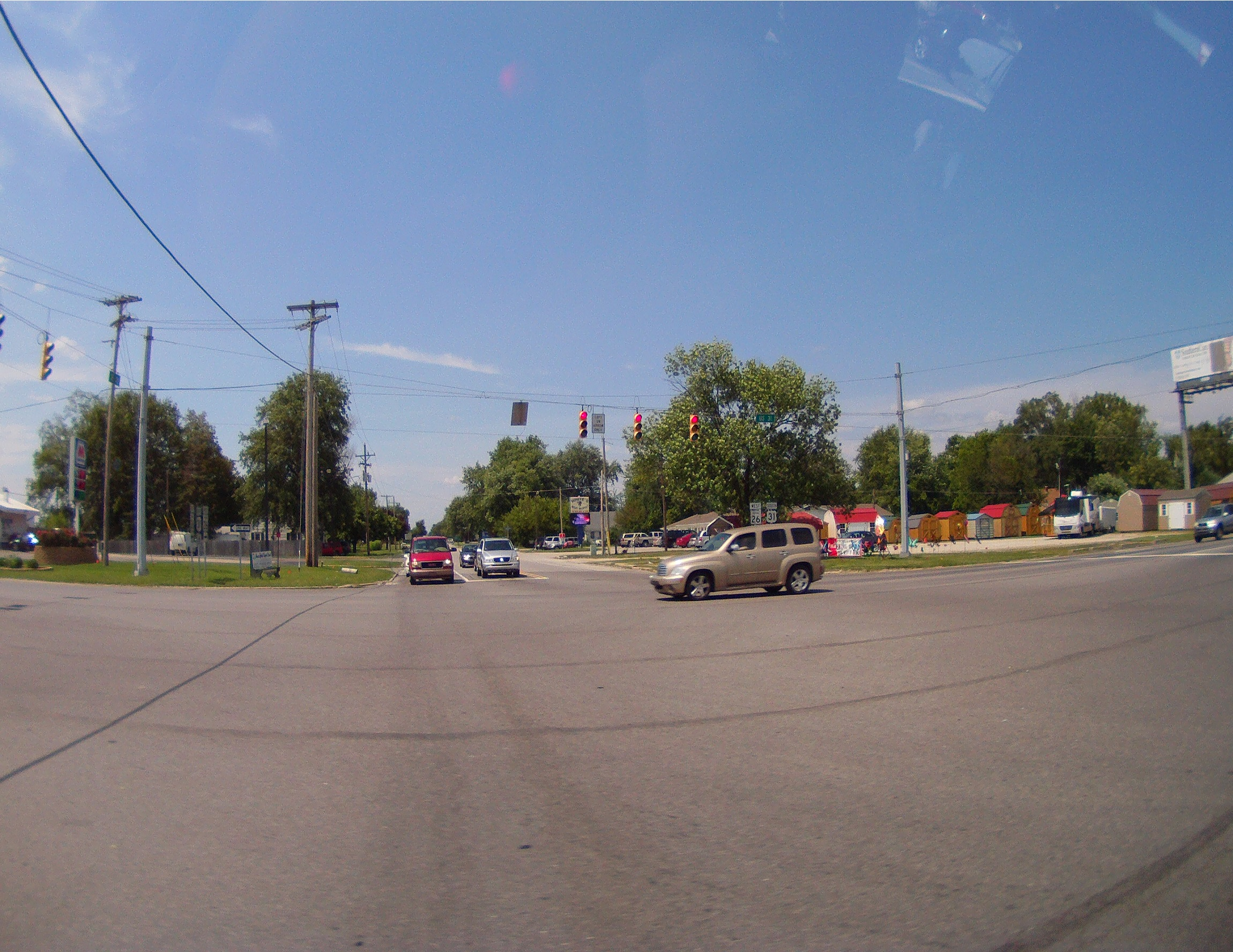
- Intersection of Highway 931 and Highway 26 in Harrison Township

- Location in Howard County
- Coordinates: 40°26′13″N 86°11′13″W
- Country: United States
- State: Indiana
- County: Howard

Government
  - Type: Indiana township

Area
  - Total: 21.77 sq mi (56.4 km^{2})
  - Land: 21.68 sq mi (56.2 km^{2})
  - Water: 0.09 sq mi (0.23 km^{2}) 0.41%
- Elevation: 833 ft (254 m)

Population (2020)
  - Total: 9,848
  - Density: 437.8/sq mi (169.0/km^{2})
- GNIS feature ID: 0453389

Harrison Township is one of 11 townships in Howard County, Indiana, United States. As of the 2020 census, its population was 9,848, upfrom 9,489 in 2010.

== Geography ==
Historical population
Census	Pop.	Note	%±
2000	8,498		—
2010	9,489		11.7%
2020	9,848		3.8%
U.S. Census

According to the 2010 census, the township has a total area of 21.77 square miles (56.4 km^{2}), of which 21.68 square miles (56.2 km^{2}) (or 99.59%) is land and 0.09 square miles (0.23 km^{2}) (or 0.41%) is water. Harrison Township was also one of the only townships in Howard County to grow from 2000 to 2010.

=== Cities and towns ===
- Kokomo (southwest edge)

=== Unincorporated towns ===
- West Middleton

=== Former Settlements ===
- Alto (annexed into Kokomo in 2012)
- Tarkington

=== Adjacent townships ===
- Clay Township (north)
- Center Township (northeast)
- Taylor Township (east)
- Liberty Township, Tipton County (southeast)
- Prairie Township, Tipton County (south)
- Honey Creek Township (west)
- Monroe Township (west)

=== Cemeteries ===
The township contains two cemeteries: Sunset Memory Gardens and Twin Spring.

=== Major highways ===
- SR 931
- SR 26

=== Airports and landing strips ===
- Glenndale Airport
- Ruzicka Airport

== Recreation ==
=== Golf Courses ===
- Chipendale Golf Course, located a mile south of SR 26 on Park Road.
- Rice's Golf Center, located on US 31 at Center Road.
- Wildcat Creek Golf Course, located in Timbervalley subdivision, entrances on Center Road and SR 26.

=== Parks ===
- Jackson-Morrow Park, entrances located on Park Road between Alto and Center roads as well as on Webster Street.

== Schools ==
- Western High School
- Western Middle School
- Western Administration Building

== Post Offices ==
- West Middleton Post Office, located at the corner of Alto Road and Rabbit Street.
- Kokomo Main Post Office, located at the corner of Webster Street and Lincoln Road.

=== Public Safety ===
- Harrison Township Volunteer Fire Department, 4102 S. Dixon Road
