= Darrough =

Darrough may refer to:

- John S. Darrough (1841–1920), a Union Army soldier in the American Civil War
- Darrough Chapel, Indiana, an unincorporated town in Center Township, Howard County
