= Taylor Community School Corporation =

School district in Indiana, United States

Coordinates: 40°26′07.6″N 86°03′17.1″W

Taylor Community School Corporation is a public school district in Howard County, Indiana, United States. The school district serves extreme southern Kokomo, Indiana, Indian Heights, Indiana, and the entity of Taylor Township. The mascot is the Titan.

== Administration ==
Steve Dishon, Ed.S., Superintendent

== Building Directory ==
- Taylor Elementary School (PreK–5)
- Taylor Middle School (6–8)
- Taylor High School (9–12)
