= Nevada, Indiana =

- Unincorporated community
- Location within Indiana Location within the United States
- Coordinates: 40°23′43″N 86°00′15″W
- Country: United States
- State: Indiana
- County: Tipton
- Township: Liberty
- Founded: c. 1850
- Founder: Benjamin Denny
- Named for: Town in Mexico
- Elevation: 863 ft (263 m)
- Time zone: UTC-5 (Eastern (EST))
  - Summer (DST): UTC-4 (EDT)
- ZIP code: 46068
- Area code: 765
- FIPS code: 18-52272
- GNIS feature ID: 440011

Nevada (/nɪˈveɪdə/ niv-AY-də) is an unincorporated community in Liberty Township, Tipton County, in the U.S. state of Indiana.

It is part of the Kokomo, Indiana Metropolitan Statistical Area.

== History ==
Nevada was first settled by Benjamin Denny. Denny moved to the area from Madison County around 1850. The town was platted by Denny and William Marshall in October, 1852. Sylvester Turpen named the community after "a town in Mexico." A post office was established in 1850, and it was abolished in 1907. The first general store was opened in 1850. The first grist mill and saw mill, which were combined, were opened in 1854.

In 1881, Tom Fox murdered Erastus Nordyke in a wheat field just outside Nevada. Fox was never arrested because he could not be found. His disappearance was described as if he had been "swallowed up in the earth." (p.248)
