= Prairie Township, Tipton County, Indiana =

Prairie Township
- Township
- Location in Tipton County
- Coordinates: 40°21′11″N 86°11′36″W
- Country: United States
- State: Indiana
- County: Tipton

Government
  - Type: Indiana township

Area
  - Total: 39.69 sq mi (102.8 km^{2})
  - Land: 39.69 sq mi (102.8 km^{2})
  - Water: 0 sq mi (0 km^{2}) 0%
- Elevation: 896 ft (273 m)

Population (2020)
  - Total: 1,061
  - Density: 26.73/sq mi (10.32/km^{2})
- Time zone: UTC-5 (Eastern (EST))
  - Summer (DST): UTC-4 (EDT)
- ZIP codes: 46049, 46068, 46072, 46979
- Area code: 765
- GNIS feature ID: 453771

Prairie Township is one of six townships in Tipton County, Indiana, United States. As of the 2020 census, its population was 1,061 (down from 1,140 at 2010) and it contained 456 housing units.

== History ==
Prior to becoming a township, a portion of the land was Miami Indian reservation land. White squatters did settle illegally in the area. The first known named white settler in the area was Alexander Suite. He came to Indiana in 1842 originally Tennessee. Suite built the first log cabin in the township. He eventually relocated to Russiaville, Indiana, eventually. Upon forced relocation of the Miami Indians, the land became available for purchase in 1847.

The Prairieville Cemetery, the first in the township, was founded in 1844. The first frame house was built in 1850.

== Geography ==
Prior to 1849, Prairie Township was larger than it is today. The western half of Liberty Township was located in Prairie Township. According to the 2010 census, the township has a total area of 39.69 square miles (102.8 km^{2}), all land.

=== Natural environment ===
Historically, Prairie Township was very flat. The soil is thick and conducive to being agriculturally beneficial. The western side of the township was slough or prairie. An extensive drainage system was installed throughout the township which led to the draining of the slough areas, allowing for more farming. White settlers cleared out a large portion of the trees for lumber. Prior to this, the township was plentiful with walnut, beech, maple, elm, ash, willow and spicebush.

=== Unincorporated towns ===
- Groomsville at 40.345871°N 86.202772°W

=== Adjacent townships ===
- Harrison Township, Howard County (north)
- Taylor Township, Howard County (northeast)
- Liberty Township (east)
- Cicero Township (southeast)
- Jefferson Township (south)
- Johnson Township, Clinton County (southwest)
- Forest Township, Clinton County (west)
- Honey Creek Township, Howard County (northwest)

== Government ==
=== Political districts ===
- Indiana's 5th congressional district
- State House District 32
- State Senate District 21

== Education ==
The first school in the township was built in 1845. Oren Williams was the first teacher. He was paid using a subscription model. Terms were three months long and he was paid $1.25 per term per student. Public schools became part of the community in 1852.

== Today ==
Students in Prairie Township attend Tri-Central Community Schools.

== Infrastructure ==
=== Major highways ===
- U.S. Route 31

=== Cemeteries ===
The Prairieville Cemetery was founded in 1844, it was the first in the township. The Normanda Cemetery was founded after the Prairieville Cemetery, followed by the founding of the Liberty Cemetery.
