= Liberty Township, Tipton County, Indiana =

Liberty Township
- Township
- Location in Tipton County
- Coordinates: 40°22′08″N 86°03′48″W
- Country: United States
- State: Indiana
- County: Tipton
- Established: 1849

Government
  - Type: Indiana township

Area
  - Total: 34.89 sq mi (90.4 km^{2})
  - Land: 34.89 sq mi (90.4 km^{2})
  - Water: 0 sq mi (0 km^{2}) 0%
- Elevation: 876 ft (267 m)

Population (2020)
  - Total: 2,332
  - Density: 66.84/sq mi (25.81/km^{2})
- Time zone: UTC-5 (Eastern (EST))
  - Summer (DST): UTC-4 (EDT)
- ZIP codes: 46068, 46072, 46076, 46902
- Area code: 765
- GNIS feature ID: 0453562

Liberty Township is one of six townships in Tipton County, Indiana, United States. As of the 2020 census, its population was 2,332 (down from 2,471 at 2010) and it contained 975 housing units.

== History ==
A man with the surname of Kaywood was the first white settler in what is now Liberty Township. He built the first known log cabin in the township. The next known settler was William Riggs, who came from Madison County, Indiana in 1853. During the years of early settlement, settlers had to travel to New London, Lafayette, or Perkinsville.

Prior to its founding, Liberty Township was a part of Prairie Township and Wildcat Township. After June 1849, county officials decided to create "a new township organized out of the west part of Wildcat Township, to be called Liberty Township..." In September 1851, a two-mile piece of Prairie Township was added to Liberty Township. Sharpsville was considered for the county seat that same year, but Tipton would end up having that role.

== Geography ==
According to the 2010 census, the township has a total area of 34.89 square miles (90.4 km^{2}), all land.

=== Natural environment ===
Historically, the township had rich soil which was valuable for agriculture. Timber was plentiful and included walnut, poplar, oak, sycamore, elm, beech, maple, hickory and ash.

=== Cities, towns, villages ===
- Sharpsville

=== Unincorporated towns ===
- Nevada at 40.395316°N 86.004154°W

(This list is based on USGS data and may include former settlements.)

=== Adjacent townships ===
- Taylor Township, Howard County (north)
- Wildcat Township (east)
- Cicero Township (south)
- Prairie Township (west)
- Harrison Township, Howard County (northwest)

== Economy ==
Historically, Liberty Township was known for agriculture, with corn being the most popular crop. Oats, wheat, hay, tomatoes, peas, and beans were also commonly farmed, the latter three primarily for canning.

== Government ==
=== Political districts ===
- Indiana's 5th congressional district
- State House District 32
- State Senate District 21

== Education ==
=== Early history ===
The first school in the township was built in Sharpsville and began operation in 1852. Martha Ann Grishaw was the teacher. A second school was built, right downtown, just after the first school. All schools were operated on the subscription model. Public schools became available in 1852.

=== Today ===
Students in Liberty Township attend Tri-Central Community Schools.

== Infrastructure ==
=== Cemeteries ===
The township contains these four cemeteries: Jackson, Barlow (aka Mudcreek), Sharp, and Turner.
