= Western School Corporation =

School district in Indiana, United States

Coordinates: 40°26′18.6″N 86°14′35.5″W

Western School Corporation is a public school district which serves Russiaville, Alto, New London, West Middleton, and southwestern Kokomo in Howard County, Indiana. The district spans the Howard County townships of Harrison, Honey Creek and Monroe, and the school buildings themselves straddle Harrison and Monroe.

WSC's high school gained national attention in the mid-1980s. When one of the students at the junior high, a hemophiliac Ryan White had been diagnosed with AIDS and recovering from an opportunistic infection (viral pneumonia), the school decided that White was ineligible to attend school out of fear the disease could spread. White was forced to take many of his eighth grade classes by speakerphone until a prolonged court battle overturned Western School Corporation's decision.

== Administration ==
- Mark DuBois, Superintendent

== Building directory ==
- Western Administration Building
- Western Primary School (K–2)
- Western Intermediate School (3–5)
- Western Middle School (6–8)
- Western High School (9–12)
