= Richard Bassett (Indiana politician) =

American politician

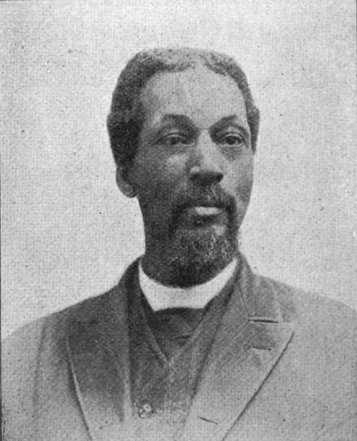
Richard Bassett

Richard Bassett (March 28, 1846 – February 21, 1905) was a Baptist minister and a Republican member of the Indiana House of Representatives from Howard County. He was one of four African American state legislators elected in Indiana in the 19th century.

== Early life and education ==
Bassett was born in 1846 at Snow Hill, North Carolina, to free black parents. In 1848, he moved with his parents to a Quaker community in Parke County, Indiana. There his father, Zachariah Bassett, first began to preach. Both Richard and his brother Miles would follow their father into the ministry.

In 1856, the Bassetts, along with the Artis and Ellis families, established a new African-American settlement in Ervin Township in Howard County. Known as the Bassett Settlement, the community grew to 11 families, and at its peak had its own school, church, and post office, as well as a general store and blacksmith shop. Bassett attended local Quaker schools.

Bassett formally joined the Free Union Baptist Church at the Bassett Settlement in November 1864.

In 1864, Bassett married Ann Hawkins, with whom he subsequently had six children. Upon her death in 1876, he married Nancy A. Hamilton, with whom he had four children. She died in 1888, and he later married Luvinie Reed in 1891.

== Career ==
In August 1867, Bassett was ordained a Baptist minister at New Albany, Indiana. In his subsequent career, churches where he served as minister included the Shiloh Church of Rising Sun (his first posting), the Second Church of New Albany (eight years), the Corinthian Baptist Church of Indianapolis (five years), the Free Union Baptist Church at the Bassett settlement, and the Second Church of Kokomo. (The Second Church of Kokomo served as the successor to the Free Union Baptist Church, which closed in the 1880s.)

Bassett was particularly known for his work in the Sunday School movement, and was appointed "state Sunday-school missionary" in 1888.

In 1892, Bassett was elected to the Indiana House of Representatives from Howard County. He served one term. He was the third African American legislator ever elected in Indiana, after James Sidney Hinton and James Matthew Townsend. Staunchly religious, his vote in opposition to a resolution supporting the 1893 World's Fair being open on Sundays attracted attention. Due to illness, however, he did not participate fully in the 1893 legislative session, and was obliged to be absent for part of it.

Bassett's final post was at the Mount Zion Baptist Church in Indianapolis, where he served from 1900 to 1903. In 1903, he suffered a stroke which ended his preaching career.

Upon his death, plans were laid for a monument to be erected in Bassett's memory in Kokomo; it was to have been dedicated in 1906.
