= Groomsville =

Groomsville may refer to:

- Groomsville, Indiana, an unincorporated community in Tipton County
- Groomsville, Queensland, a locality in Australia
