= Vermont, Indiana =

- Unincorporated community
- Location within Indiana Location within the United States
- Coordinates: 40°29′57″N 86°01′55″W
- Country: United States
- State: Indiana
- County: Howard
- Township: Howard
- Laid out: January 1848
- Elevation: 827 ft (252 m)
- ZIP code: 46901
- FIPS code: 18-78830
- GNIS feature ID: 445252

Vermont is an unincorporated community in Howard Township, Howard County, Indiana, United States platted in January 1848. The founders also then already had a store set up in Vermont. In the late 19th century it was a German campground. Vermont was in the flooding zone when the Wildcat Creek Reservoir was constructed in 1957, and it never recovered from that. Vermont was once the home of the "Vermont Covered Bridge" which now sits in Highland Park in Kokomo, Indiana. It is part of the Kokomo Metropolitan Statistical Area.

== School ==
The area is served by Howard Elementary School, and North Western Schools.

== History ==
Vermont was named in 1849 after the home state of the town's founder, Milton Hadley.

The town at one time could be compared to the current Greentown. In 1957, the county built the Wildcat Creek Reservoir and Vermont was in the flood zone for that. Part of the town either moved north slightly or the northern tip is all that remains today. Therefore, it could be considered a ghost town.

== Vermont Covered Bridge ==
The Vermont Covered Bridge that is now located in Highland Park and on the National Register Of Historic Places list in nearby Kokomo was once a bridge used in Vermont on the Wildcat Creek. The bridge was where the current concrete bridge is on 500 East between 50 North and 100 North, it was replaced with the current bridge when the county started planning the current reservoir. The City of Kokomo paid Vermont for the bridge and it was set to be moved to Kokomo. The arson, plus the age of the bridge made the bridge need some repairs for the park, and the park also opted for foot traffic only for safety reasons, and currently the bridge is only open to foot traffic in the fall. The sign on the front has the year 1875 printed on the front of it, the year it was built in Vermont by a contractor in Ohio.
