= Ryan White =

American AIDS spokesperson and poster boy (1971–1990)

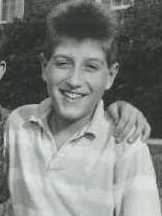
- White in 1989
- Born: Ryan Wayne White; December 6, 1971; Kokomo, Indiana, U.S.
- Died: April 8, 1990 (aged 18); Indianapolis, Indiana, U.S.
- Cause of death: AIDS-related pneumonia
- Resting place: Cicero, Indiana
- Occupation: Student

Ryan Wayne White (December 6, 1971 – April 8, 1990) was an American teenager from Kokomo, Indiana, who became a national poster child for HIV/AIDS in the United States after his school barred him from attending classes following a diagnosis of AIDS.

As a hemophiliac, White became infected with HIV from a contaminated factor VIII blood treatment and, when diagnosed in December 1984, was given six months to live. Doctors said he posed no risk to other students, as AIDS is not an airborne disease and spreads solely through bodily fluids, but AIDS was poorly understood by the general public at the time. When White tried to return to school, irate parents and teachers in Howard County rallied against his attendance due to unwarranted concerns of the disease spreading to other students and staff. A lengthy administrative appeal process ensued, and news of the conflict turned White into a popular celebrity and advocate for AIDS research and public education. Surprising his doctors, White lived five years longer than predicted. He died on April 8, 1990, one month before his high school graduation.

During the 1980s, AIDS was largely stigmatized as an illness impacting the gay community. In the U.S., that perception shifted with the media focus placed on White and other prominent heterosexual HIV-infected people such as Magic Johnson, Arthur Ashe and the Ray brothers. The U.S. Congress passed a major piece of AIDS legislation, the Ryan White CARE Act, shortly after White's death, which was signed into law by President George H. W. Bush in August 1990 and reauthorized twice. Through the "Ryan White programs" which it funds, the act has become the largest provider of services for people living with HIV/AIDS in the United States.

== Early life and illness ==
Ryan Wayne White was born on December 6, 1971, at St. Joseph Memorial Hospital in Kokomo, Indiana, to Hubert Wayne and Jeanne Elaine (née Hale) White. When he was circumcised, the bleeding would not stop; when he was three days old, doctors diagnosed him with severe hemophilia A, a hereditary blood coagulation disorder associated with the X chromosome, which causes even minor injuries to result in severe bleeding. For treatment, he received weekly infusions of factor VIII, a blood product created from pooled plasma of non-hemophiliacs, an increasingly common treatment for hemophiliacs at the time.

Healthy for most of his childhood, White became extremely ill with pneumonia in December 1984. On December 17, 1984, during a lung biopsy, White was diagnosed with AIDS. By this time, the scientific community had studied the epidemic in great detail. Earlier that year, HTLV-III was identified and isolated by American research scientists, confirming the work done by French research scientists who called it LAV. A lengthy public battle to determine who should be recognized as the discoverer of the human retrovirus delayed development of a test for what would later be called HIV. White had apparently received a contaminated treatment of factor VIII that was infected with HIV, as did thousands of other Americans with hemophilia and hemophiliacs around the world. At that time, because the virus had only recently been identified and there was no screening of blood products, much of the pooled factor VIII concentrate was tainted. Blood banks and pharmaceutical companies dismissed calls by the CDC to use a hepatitis B test as a surrogate until an HIV test could be developed. Later plasma products were screened and heat-treated to deactivate both HIV and hepatitis. Among hemophiliacs treated with blood-clotting factors between 1979 and 1984, nearly 90% became infected with HIV and/or hepatitis C. At the time of his diagnosis, White's T-cell count had dropped to 25 per cubic millimeter (a healthy individual without HIV will have around 500–1,200; below 200 is AIDS-defining in the U.S.). Doctors predicted Ryan White had only six months to live.

After the diagnosis, White was too ill to return to school, but, by early 1985, he began to feel better. His mother asked if he could return to school but was told by school officials that he could not. On June 30, 1985, a formal request to permit re-admittance to school was denied by Western School Corporation superintendent James O. Smith, sparking an administrative appeal process that lasted for over nine months.

== Battle with schools ==
Timeline of legal battle 1985–86 school year
| June 30 | Superintendent James O. Smith denies Ryan White admittance to school. |
| Aug 26 | First day of school. White is allowed to listen to his classes via telephone. |
| Oct 2 | School principal upholds decision to prohibit White. |
| Nov 25 | Indiana Department of Education rules that White must be admitted. |
| Dec 17 | The school board votes 7–0 to appeal the ruling. |
| Feb 6 | Indiana DOE again rules White can attend school, after inspection by Howard County health officers. |
| Feb 13 | Howard County health officer determines White is fit for school. |
| Feb 19 | Howard County judge refuses to issue an injunction against White. |
| Feb 21 | White returns to school. A different judge grants a restraining order that afternoon to again bar him. |
| Mar 2 | White's opponents hold an auction in the school gymnasium to raise money to keep White out. |
| April 9 | White's case is presented in Circuit Court. |
| April 10 | Circuit Court Judge Jack R. O'Neill dissolves restraining order. White returns to school. |
| July 18 | Indiana Court of Appeals declines to hear any further appeals. |

Western Middle School in Russiaville faced enormous pressure from many parents and faculty to prevent White from returning to the campus after his diagnosis became widely known. In the school of 360 total students, 117 parents and 50 teachers signed a petition encouraging school leaders to ban White from school. Due to the widespread fear and ignorance of AIDS, the principal and later the school board succumbed to this pressure and prohibited re-admittance. The White family filed a federal lawsuit seeking to overturn the decision. The Whites initially filed suit in the U.S. District Court for the Southern District of Indiana. The court, however, declined to hear the case until administrative appeals had been resolved. On November 25, an Indiana Department of Education officer ruled that the school must follow the Indiana Board of Health guidelines and that White must be allowed to attend school.

In the mid and late 1980s, the means of transmission of HIV were not yet fully understood. Scientists knew it spread via blood and was not transmittable by any sort of casual contact (such as shaking hands or being in the same room), but as recently as 1983, the American Medical Association had thought that "Evidence Suggests Household Contact May Transmit AIDS", and the belief that the disease could easily spread persisted. Children with AIDS were still rare; at the time of White's rejection from school, the Centers for Disease Control and Prevention knew of only 148 cases of pediatric AIDS in the United States. Many families in Kokomo believed his presence posed an unacceptable risk. When White was permitted to return to school for one day in February 1986, 151 of 360 students stayed home. He also worked as a paperboy, and many of the people on his route canceled their subscriptions, believing that HIV could be transmitted through newsprint.

The Indiana state health commissioner, Dr. Woodrow Myers, who had extensive experience treating AIDS patients in San Francisco, and the Centers for Disease Control and Prevention both notified the board that White posed no risk to other students, but the school board and many parents ignored their statements. In February 1986, The New England Journal of Medicine published a study of 101 people who had spent three months living in close but non-sexual contact with people with AIDS. The study concluded that the risk of infection was "minimal to nonexistent," even when contact included sharing toothbrushes, razors, clothing, combs, and drinking glasses; sleeping in the same bed; and hugging and kissing.

When White was finally readmitted in April, a group of families withdrew their children and started an alternative school. Threats of violence and lawsuits persisted. According to White's mother, people on the street would often yell, "we know you're queer" at White. The editors and publishers of the Kokomo Tribune, which supported White both editorially and financially, were also ridiculed by members of the community and threatened with death for their actions.

White attended Western Middle School for eighth grade during the 1985–1986 school year. He was deeply unhappy and had few friends. The school required him to eat with disposable utensils, use separate bathrooms, and waived his requirement to enroll in a gym class. Threats continued. When a bullet was fired through the Whites' living room window (no one was home at the time), the family decided to leave Kokomo. After finishing the school year, his family moved to Cicero, Indiana, where he began ninth grade at Hamilton Heights High School, in Arcadia, Indiana. On August 31, 1986, a "very nervous" White was greeted by school principal Tony Cook, school system superintendent Bob G. Carnal, and a handful of students who had been educated about AIDS and were unafraid to shake White's hand.

== National spokesman ==
The publicity of White's story catapulted him into the national spotlight, amidst a growing wave of AIDS coverage in the news media. Between 1985 and 1987, the number of news stories about AIDS in the American media doubled. While isolated in middle school, White appeared frequently on national television and in newspapers to discuss his tribulations with the disease. Eventually, he became known as a poster child for the AIDS crisis, appearing in fundraising and educational campaigns for the syndrome. White participated in numerous public benefits for children with AIDS. Many celebrities appeared with him, starting during his trial and continuing for the rest of his life, to help publicly destigmatize socializing with people with AIDS. Singers John Mellencamp, Elton John and Michael Jackson, actor Matt Frewer, diver Greg Louganis, President Ronald Reagan and First Lady Nancy Reagan, Surgeon General Dr. C. Everett Koop, Indiana University basketball coach Bob Knight and basketball player Kareem Abdul-Jabbar all befriended White. He also was a friend to many children with AIDS or other potentially debilitating conditions.

For the rest of his life, White appeared frequently on Phil Donahue's talk show. His celebrity crush, Alyssa Milano of the then-popular TV show Who's the Boss?, met White and gave him a friendship bracelet and a kiss. Elton John loaned Jeanne White $16,500 to put toward a down payment on the Cicero home, and, rather than accept repayment, placed the repaid money into a college fund for White's sister. In high school, White drove a red 1988 Ford Mustang LX 5.0, a gift from Michael Jackson. Despite the fame and donations, White stated that he disliked the public spotlight, loathed remarks that seemingly blamed his parents or his upbringing for his illness, and emphasized that he would be willing at any moment to trade his fame for freedom from the disease.

In 1988, White spoke before the President's Commission on the HIV Epidemic. White told the commission of the discrimination he had faced when he first tried to return to school, but how education about the disease had made him welcome in the town of Cicero. White emphasized his differing experiences in Kokomo and Cicero as an example of the power and importance of AIDS education.

In 1989, ABC aired the television movie The Ryan White Story, starring Lukas Haas as White, Judith Light as Jeanne and Nikki Cox as his sister Andrea. White had a small cameo appearance as "Chad" in the film, playing a boy who also has HIV and later befriends Haas. Others in the film included Sarah Jessica Parker as a sympathetic nurse, George Dzundza as his doctor, and George C. Scott as White's attorney, who legally argued against school board authorities. Nielsen estimated that the movie was seen by 15 million viewers. Some residents of Kokomo felt that the movie was condemning of them for their actions against White. After the film aired, the office of Kokomo mayor Robert F. Sargent was flooded with complaints from across the country, although Sargent had not been mayor during the time of the controversy.

By early 1990, White's health was deteriorating rapidly. In his final public appearance, he hosted an after-Oscars party with former president Ronald Reagan and his wife Nancy in California. Despite his declining health, White spoke to the Reagans about his date to the prom and his hopes of attending college.

== Death ==
We owe it to Ryan to make sure that the fear and ignorance that chased him from his home and his school will be eliminated. We owe it to Ryan to open our hearts and our minds to those with AIDS. We owe it to Ryan to be compassionate, caring, and tolerant toward those with AIDS, their families, and friends. It's the disease that's frightening, not the people who have it.

— Former US President Ronald Reagan, April 11, 1990

On March 29, 1990, White entered Riley Hospital for Children in Indianapolis with a respiratory tract infection. As his condition deteriorated, he was sedated and placed on a ventilator. Elton John visited him, and the hospital was deluged with calls from well-wishers. White died on April 8, 1990, at age 18.

Over 1,500 people attended White's funeral on April 11, a standing-room only event held at the Second Presbyterian Church on Meridian Street in Indianapolis. White's pallbearers included Elton John, football star Howie Long and Phil Donahue. Elton John performed "Skyline Pigeon" at the funeral. The funeral was also attended by singer Michael Jackson, and then-First Lady Barbara Bush. On the day of the funeral, Ronald Reagan wrote a tribute to White that appeared in The Washington Post. Reagan's statement about AIDS and White's funeral were seen as indicators of how greatly White had helped change perceptions of AIDS.

White is buried in Cicero, close to the former home of his mother. In the year following his death, his grave was vandalized on four occasions. As time passed, White's grave became a shrine for his admirers.

== Legacy ==
White was one of a handful of highly visible people with AIDS in the 1980s and early 1990s who helped change the public perception of the disease. White, along with actor Rock Hudson, was one of the earliest public faces of AIDS. Other public figures who were infected with HIV included Keith Haring, Holly Johnson, Freddie Mercury, the Ray brothers, Magic Johnson, Greg Louganis, Arthur Ashe, Liberace, Eazy-E, Tim Richmond, Anthony Perkins, Randy Shilts, Ricky Wilson, Robert Reed, and Jerry Smith. White helped to increase public awareness that HIV/AIDS was a significant epidemic.

Numerous charities formed around White's death. The Indiana University Dance Marathon, started in 1991, raises money for the Riley Hospital for Children. Between 1991 and 2022, this event helped raise over $50 million for children at Riley. The money raised has also helped fund the Ryan White Infectious Disease Clinic at the hospital to take care of the nation's sickest children. White's personal physician, with whom he was close friends, Dr. Martin Kleiman, became the Ryan White Professor of Pediatrics at Indiana University School of Medicine in Indianapolis. In a 1993 interview, prominent gay rights and AIDS activist Larry Kramer said, "I think little Ryan White probably did more to change the face of this illness and to move people than anyone. And he continues to be a presence through his mom, Jeanne White. She has an incredibly moving presence as she speaks around the world."

In 1992, White's mother founded the national nonprofit Ryan White Foundation. The foundation worked to increase awareness of HIV/AIDS-related issues, with a focus on hemophiliacs like White, and on families caring for relatives with the disease. The foundation was active throughout the 1990s, with donations reaching $300,000 a year in 1997. Between 1997 and 2000, however, AIDS donations declined nationwide by 21%, and the Ryan White Foundation saw its donation level drop to $100,000 a year. In 2000, White's mother closed the foundation, and merged its remaining assets with AIDS Action, a larger charity. She became a spokeswoman for AIDS activism and continued to arrange speaking events through the site devoted to her son, ryanwhite.com (no longer online as of October 2020). White's high school, Hamilton Heights, has had a student–government-sponsored annual AIDS Walk, with proceeds going to a Ryan White Scholarship Fund.

Elton John has cited White's death as the major impetus behind his decision to fight his long-standing alcohol and cocaine addiction; he went into rehab shortly afterwards and later created the Elton John AIDS Foundation. White also became the inspiration for a handful of popular songs. Elton John donated proceeds from "The Last Song", which appears on his album The One, to a Ryan White fund at Riley Hospital. Michael Jackson dedicated the song "Gone Too Soon" from his Dangerous album to White, as did 1980s pop star Tiffany with the song "Here in My Heart" on her New Inside album. In November 2007, The Children's Museum of Indianapolis opened an exhibit called "The Power of Children: Making a Difference", which features White's bedroom and belongings alongside similar tributes to Anne Frank and Ruby Bridges. After White died, Greg Louganis gave his Olympic gold medal to White's mother, and it is now part of the display about White at the Children's Museum. In April 2015, Louganis visited The Power of Children exhibit with Jeanne to see his medal in White's recreated room. He said then, "The thing I'll always remember about Ryan is his courage, strength, and sense of humor...The way Ryan lived his life continues to give me the strength and courage to do things I might not otherwise feel comfortable doing."

=== Ryan White and public perception of AIDS ===
In the early 1980s, AIDS was known as gay-related immune deficiency, because the disease had first been identified among primarily homosexual communities in Los Angeles, New York City, and San Francisco. At the start of the HIV/AIDS epidemic in the United States, the disease was thought to be a "homosexual problem" and was largely ignored by policymakers. White's diagnosis demonstrated to many that AIDS was not exclusive to homosexual men. Lesser criticisms had been made that the disease was a punishment for drug abuse and heterosexual promiscuity, citing "an expensive price to pay for drugs and casual sex". In his advocacy for AIDS research, White, who was not gay himself, always rejected any criticism of homosexuality.

White was seen by some as an "innocent victim" of the AIDS epidemic. White and his family strongly rejected the language of "innocent victim" because the phrase was often used to imply that gay people with AIDS were "guilty". His mother told The New York Times

Ryan always said, "I'm just like everyone else with AIDS, no matter how I got it." And he would never have lived as long as he did without the gay community. The people we knew in New York made sure we knew about the latest treatments way before we would have known in Indiana. I hear mothers today say they're not gonna work with no gay community on anything. Well, if it comes to your son's life, you better start changing your heart and your attitude around.

=== Ryan White CARE Act ===
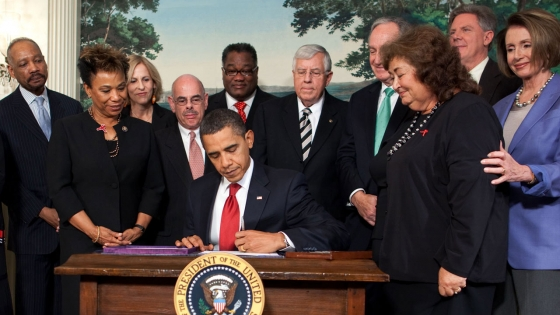
President Barack Obama signs the Ryan White HIV/AIDS Treatment Extension Act of 2009, with White's mother Jeanne White-Ginder (second from right) present.

In August 1990, four months after White's death, Congress enacted The Ryan White Comprehensive AIDS Resources Emergency (CARE) Act (often known simply as the Ryan White CARE Act), in his honor. The act is the United States' largest federally funded program for people living with HIV/AIDS. The Ryan White CARE Act funds several different programs to improve availability of care for low-income, uninsured and underinsured victims of AIDS and their families.

Ryan White programs are "payers of last resort", which subsidize treatment when no other resources are available. The Act provided some level of care for around 500,000 people a year and, in 2004, provided funds to 2,567 organizations. Ryan White programs also provide funding and technical assistance to local and state primary medical care providers, support services, healthcare providers and training programs.

The act was reauthorized in 1996, 2000, 2006, and 2009. Since the Affordable Care Act of 2010 prohibited discrimination on the basis of health status and expanded access to insurance coverage, some experts debated the need for programs like the Ryan White Act. The Ryan White CARE Act expired in 2013, but individual programs continue to receive congressional funding.

In 2024, over half of the people diagnosed with HIV in the United States (more than 550,000) were provided care and treatment from the funded programs, and 57,000 health care professionals treating people with HIV received education and training.

== See also ==
- Eve van Grafhorst – an Australian preschooler who received HIV via a blood transfusion and was subsequently banned from her preschool in fears of spreading the illness
