= Jackson Township, Cass County, Indiana =

Jackson Township
- Township
- Location of Jackson Township in Cass County
- Coordinates: 40°36′30″N 86°12′52″W
- Country: United States
- State: Indiana
- County: Cass

Government
  - Type: Indiana township

Area
  - Total: 30.05 sq mi (77.84 km^{2})
  - Land: 30.03 sq mi (77.79 km^{2})
  - Water: 0.019 sq mi (0.05 km^{2})
- Elevation: 781 ft (238 m)

Population (2020)
  - Total: 2,773
  - Density: 92.33/sq mi (35.65/km^{2})
- FIPS code: 18-36846
- GNIS feature ID: 453435

Jackson Township is one of fourteen townships in Cass County, Indiana. As of the 2020 census, its population was 2,773 (down from 2,876 at 2010) and contained 1,246 housing units.

== History ==
Jackson Township was organized on June 6, 1847, in a meeting at the home of William Frush. It was named for Andrew Jackson, seventh President of the United States.

== Geography ==
Jackson Township covers an area of 30.05 square miles (77.8 km^{2}); 0.02 square miles (0.052 km^{2}) (0.07 percent) of this is water.

=== Cities and towns ===
- Galveston

=== Unincorporated towns ===
- Lincoln

=== Adjacent townships ===
- Tipton (north)
- Pipe Creek Township, Miami County (northeast)
- Deer Creek Township, Miami County (east)
- Clay Township, Howard County (south)
- Ervin Township, Howard County (southwest)
- Deer Creek (west)

=== Major highways ===
- U.S. Route 35
- Indiana State Road 18

=== Cemeteries ===
The township contains four cemeteries: McWilliams, Meeks, Patterson and Sprinkle.
