= West Middleton, Indiana =

- Unincorporated community and Census-designated place
- Location within Indiana Location within the United States
- Coordinates: 40°26′28″N 86°12′54″W
- Country: United States
- State: Indiana
- County: Howard
- Township: Harrison
- Elevation: 824 ft (251 m)

Population (2006)
  - Total: 250
- ZIP code: 46995
- FIPS code: 18-83042
- GNIS feature ID: 2830416

West Middleton is an unincorporated town between Russiaville and Kokomo in western Howard County, Indiana, United States. It is part of the Kokomo, Indiana Metropolitan Statistical Area.

== History ==
West Middleton was laid out in 1873 by William Middleton, and named for him.

West Middleton's old school's nickname was the Broncos.

== Geography ==
West Middleton is located on County Road 250 South Road (Alto Road).

== Demographics ==
Historical population
Census	Pop.	Note	%±
2023 (est.)	194

The United States Census Bureau defined West Middleton as a census designated place in the 2022 American Community Survey.
