= Russiaville Interurban Depot =

Train station in Russiaville, Indiana, US

Russiaville

General information
- Location: 483 East Main Street; Russiaville, Indiana
- Coordinates: 40.4174°N 86.2653°W

History
- Opened: 1912
- Closed: 1932
- Russiaville Interurban Depot
- U.S. National Register of Historic Places
- NRHP reference No.: 100007734
- Added to NRHP: May 16, 2022
Location

The Russiaville Interurban Depot is a former interurban train station in Russiaville, Indiana. Construction on the station building had begun by December 1911 under the Kokomo, Marion and Western Traction Company. It was in service between 1912 and 1932, ultimately under the Northern Indiana Power Company and Indiana Railroad.

The building is one of the few in town in town to survive the 1965 Palm Sunday tornado outbreak. It was redeveloped as condominiums, with residents into the 1990s. Th exterior was refurbished in 2015. The Depot was added to the National Register of Historic Places on May 16, 2022.
