= Lincoln, Indiana =

Lincoln
- Unincorporated community and Census-designated place
- Cass County's location in Indiana

- Location in Cass County
- Coordinates: 40°36′59″N 86°12′37″W
- Country: United States
- State: Indiana
- County: Cass
- Township: Jackson
- Elevation: 787 ft (240 m)
- ZIP code: 46994
- FIPS code: 18-43776
- GNIS feature ID: 2830328

Lincoln is an unincorporated community in Jackson Township, Cass County, Indiana.

== History ==
Lincoln had its start in the year 1852 by the building of the railroad through that territory. It was named for its founder, Theodore Lincoln. A post office was established at Lincoln in 1855, and remained in operation until it was discontinued in 1953.

== Demographics ==
The United States Census Bureau delineated Lincoln as a census designated place in the 2022 American Community Survey.
