= Alto, Indiana =

- Unincorporated town
- Intersection of W Alto Rd and S Dixon Rd in 2026

- Location within Indiana Location within the United States
- Coordinates: 40°26′24″N 86°09′56″W
- Country: United States
- State: Indiana
- County: Howard
- Township: Harrison
- Elevation: 840 ft (260 m)

Population (2006)
  - Total: 400
- ZIP code: 46902
- FIPS code: 18-01252
- GNIS feature ID: 430122

Alto was an unincorporated town which is now a neighborhood of Kokomo in Harrison Township, Howard County, Indiana, United States. It is part of the Kokomo, Indiana Metropolitan Statistical Area. Alto (along with nearby subdivision, Holiday Park and CDP, Indian Heights) was annexed into the city of Kokomo January 1, 2012.

== History ==
Alto was platted in 1848. Originally named Olinda, it was named in commemoration of the Battle of Palo Alto, in the Mexican–American War.

Alto was almost completely destroyed by an F4 tornado on the evening of April 11, 1965. Despite years of rebuilding, the population of Alto has never risen to the levels of nearby towns.

== Notable people ==
John Worth Kern, prominent leader in the U. S. Senate during the Wilson Administration, was born in Alto on December 20, 1849.
