= Kokomo-Center Township Consolidated School Corporation =

School district in Indiana

Kokomo School Corporation is located in Kokomo, Indiana and is Howard County's largest school district.

== Administration ==
- Dr. Mike Sargent, Superintendent
- Carlton Mable, Assistant Superintendent

== Building directory ==
- Bon Air Elementary
- Boulevard Elementary
- Darrough Chapel Early Learning Center
- Elwood Haynes Elementary
- Lafayette Park Elementary
- Pettit Park Elementary
- Sycamore International Elementary
- Wallace Elementary School of Integrated Arts
- Maple Crest Elementary School
- Central Middle School (former Kokomo High School)
- Bon Air Middle School
- Maple Crest Middle School
- McKinley Alternative School
- Kokomo High School (former Haworth High School)
- Kokomo Area Career Center
