= Kokomo High School =

School in Kokomo, Indiana, United States

- Kokomo High School viewed from the southeast

Location
- 2501 South Berkley Road; Kokomo, Howard County, Indiana 46902; United States; 40.456095°N 86.157630°W

Information
- Type: Public high school
- Motto: Legacy Matters
- Established: 1872
- School district: Kokomo School Corporation
- NCES District ID: 1805370
- Superintendent: Debbie Vawter
- NCES School ID: 180537000947
- Principal: Angela Blessing
- Teaching staff: 106.58 (FTE)
- Grades: 9-12
- Enrollment: 1,393 (2024–2025)
- Student to teacher ratio: 13.07
- Color
- Fight song: Onward Kokomo!
- Athletics conference: North Central
- Mascot: Koko the Kat
- Team name: Wildkats
- Rivals: Marion High School
- Newspaper: The Red and Blue
- Yearbook: The Sargasso
- Website: Official Website

Kokomo High School (merged with Haworth High School in 1984) is a four-year public high school in Kokomo, Indiana, USA. The school is the only high school in the Kokomo School Corporation.

== History ==
The earliest Kokomo High School found in records was in existence from about 1872 to 1916. The construction of the original Kokomo High School started in 1870 on the corner of Armstrong and Taylor with the first class commencing in 1872 according to a newspaper of that time. In 1898 the original high school burned down and a second building was built on the corner of Market and Sycamore. In 1914 the high school was again destroyed by fire. The third campus of Kokomo High School, first known as Howard County's Central School Building, was dedicated on October 19, 1917. Located at 303 East Superior Street, this building now houses Central Middle International School.

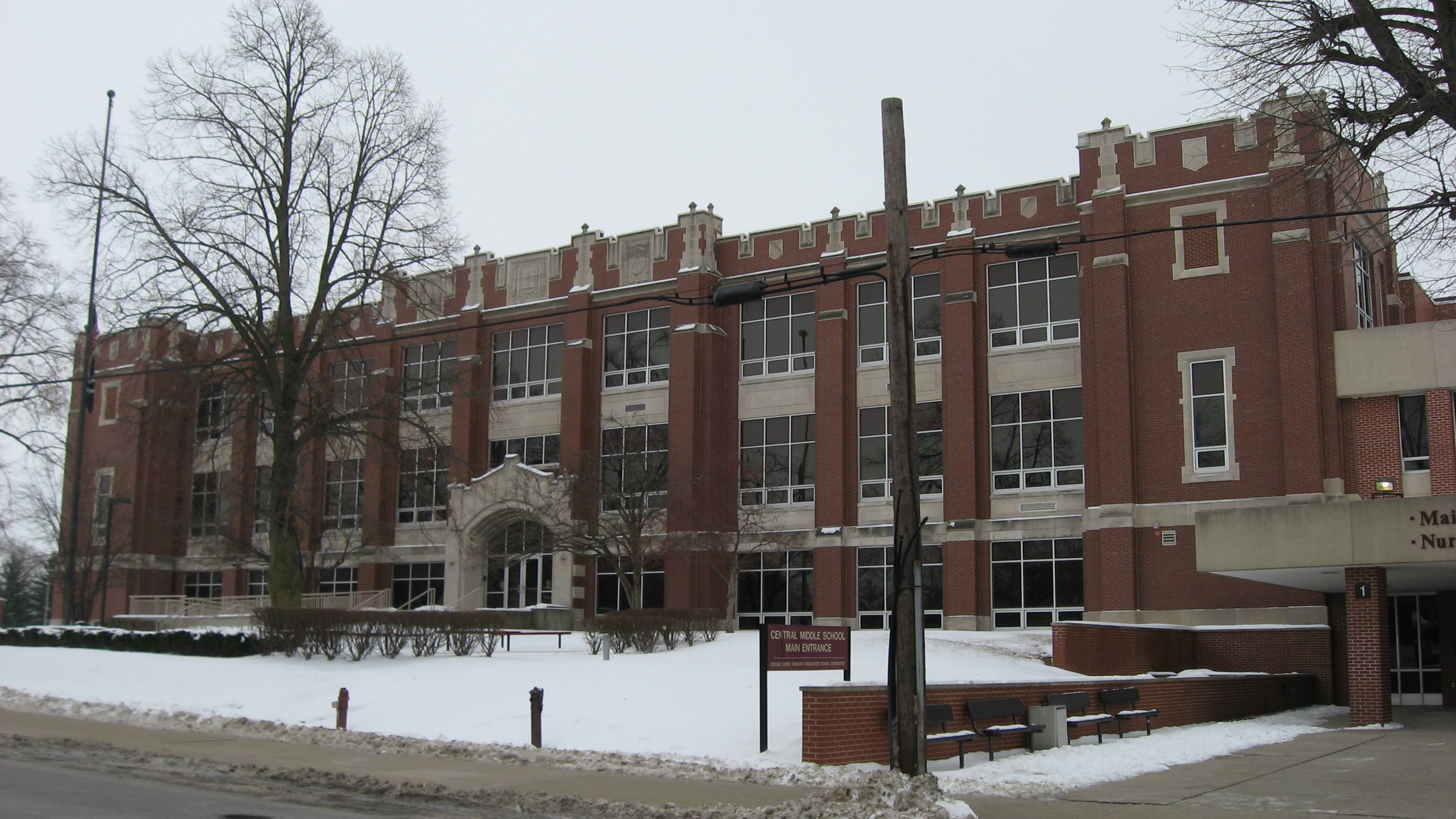
Former Kokomo High School

The current campus of Kokomo High School was built in 1968 Previously, the downtown campus was known as Kokomo High School and the south campus was named Haworth High School. However, in 1983 the Kokomo-Center Township Board of Trustees decided that two high schools were no longer necessary. Consequently, in 1984 Haworth High School was closed and the former Haworth students began attending Kokomo High School. After the reorganization, Kokomo High School was split into two campuses. The downtown campus had 8th and 9th grade students, and the south campus (the former Haworth High School) had 10th, 11th, and 12th graders. After the south campus was expanded, the south campus became the primary location and served 9th to 12th grade students. The downtown campus later became Central Middle School in 1998.

Kokomo High School still has visible reminders of the building's history, including a framed portrait of C.V. Haworth and a case featuring Haworth's mascot, the Haworth Huskies. The C.V. Haworth award is also given to Seniors who show "exceptional ability in writing and speaking". The C.V. Haworth Memorial Scholarship Fund is available to capable seniors from Kokomo High School who are entering a bachelor's degree program at Indiana University at either the Kokomo or Bloomington campuses.

== Extracurricular activities ==
=== Arts ===
Kokomo High School is host to a variety of visual and performing arts programs. Within the school are ceramic, drawing, painting and multimedia studios. Students' works are displayed in the Student Gallery. Seniors submit art for the annual senior art show in May. Performing arts are enjoyed in diverse student activities. Kokomo High School hosts six choirs: Chorale, Karisma, Choraliers, Vocal Jazz, Chamber, and Advanced Chamber. Summer Marching Band serves as the school's most popular extracurricular activity, placing second at Indiana's State Fair Band Day in 2019, first in 2022 and first in 2023. Summer Color Guard and Winter Guard are similarly popular. Extracurricular music activities include Jazz Band, Winter Wind Ensemble, and Indoor Percussion. Beginner, Intermediate, and Advanced Concert Band, Wind Ensemble, Percussion, Music Theory, and Elementary and Advanced Orchestra comprise the school's music classes.

== Athletics ==
Kokomo High School offers more than 20 sports under the Indiana High School Athletic Association. It is a member of the North Central Conference. Boys' teams compete under the name Wildkats; girls' team compete as Lady Kats. Fall sports offered by the school include boys' and girls' cross country, boys' and girls' soccer, boys' tennis, girls' golf, boys' football, and girls' volleyball. Winter sports include boys' and girls' basketball, boys' and girls' swimming and diving, and co-educational wrestling. Spring sports include boys' golf, girls' tennis, boys' baseball, girls' softball, boys' and girls' track and field, and unified track and field. Cheerleading and competitive dance are available as non-IHSAA club sports. The competitive dance team advanced to state finals for the 2017–2018 school year. The basketball teams compete about 4 miles off campus in historic Memorial Gymnasium.

State Championships
Sport	Year(s)
Baseball (1)	1985
Boys Basketball (1)	1961
Girls Basketball (3)	1992, 1993, 2003
Boys Golf (4)	1958, 1985, 1986, 1988
Boys Swimming (1)	1969
Boys Track (9)	1911, 1924, 1925, 1926, 1927, 1934, 1935, 1937, 1994

== Notable alumni ==
- Cliff Barker, 1948 Olympic gold medalist (basketball)
- Flory Bidunga, college basketball player
- Rupert Boneham, competitor on reality TV show Survivor, graduated from Haworth High School (not Kokomo High School alumnus)
- Norman Bridwell, author of Clifford the Big Red Dog
- Steve Kroft, television journalist, correspondent for 60 Minutes, attended Kokomo High School
- Jim "Goose" Ligon, basketball player
- Jack Perkins, baseball player
- Jimmy Rayl, Indiana high school Mr. Basketball, Trester Award winner, Indiana Hoosiers record holder and collegiate All-American, played for Indiana Pacers
- LeRoy Samse, Olympic pole vaulter and former world record holder.
- Joe Thatcher, MLB pitcher for Cleveland Indians, formerly of Houston Astros, Los Angeles Angels of Anaheim, Arizona Diamondbacks and San Diego Padres
- Edward Trobaugh, United States Army Major General
- Pat Underwood, high school All-American baseball player, taken #2 in Major League Baseball draft in 1976 by Detroit Tigers
- Tom Underwood, Major League Baseball pitcher for multiple teams including Philadelphia Phillies, Oakland A's, New York Yankees, Toronto Blue Jays, Baltimore Orioles, and St. Louis Cardinals.
- Brandon Wood, professional basketball player
- Don Pardee Moon, Rear Admiral in U.S. Navy during World War II at Normandy's Utah Beach in 1944

== See also ==
- List of high schools in Indiana
