= Monroe Township, Howard County, Indiana =

Monroe Township
- Township
- Location in Howard County
- Coordinates: 40°27′06″N 86°18′59″W
- Country: United States
- State: Indiana
- County: Howard

Government
  - Type: Indiana township

Area
  - Total: 19.2 sq mi (50 km^{2})
  - Land: 19.2 sq mi (50 km^{2})
  - Water: 0 sq mi (0 km^{2}) 0%
- Elevation: 810 ft (247 m)

Population (2020)
  - Total: 1,325
  - Density: 73.3/sq mi (28.3/km^{2})
- GNIS feature ID: 0453639

Monroe Township is one of eleven townships in Howard County, Indiana, United States. As of the 2020 census, its population was 1,325, down from 1,407 in 2010.

== History ==
Monroe Township was established in 1837.

== Geography ==
Historical population
Census	Pop.	Note	%±
2000	1,387		—
2010	1,407		1.4%
2020	1,325		−5.8%
U.S. Census

According to the 2010 census, the township has a total area of 19.2 square miles (50 km^{2}), all land. The streams of Little Wildcat Creek, Walnut Fork and West Honey Creek run through this township. As the 1870 census, New London was an incorporated town with a population of 240 people, which at the time was much more than Russiaville (at 160). In the 1880 census New London is no longer shown as an incorporated town, whereas Greentown (in Liberty Township) was shown as being incorporated.

=== Unincorporated communities ===
- New London
- Shanghai

(This list is based on USGS data and may include former settlements.)

=== Adjacent townships ===
- Ervin Township (north)
- Clay Township (northeast)
- Harrison Township (east)
- Honey Creek Township (southeast)
- Forest Township, Clinton County (south)
- Warren Township, Clinton County (southwest)
- Burlington Township, Carroll County (west)

=== Major highways ===
- SR 22
