= Groomsville, Indiana =

- Unincorporated community
- Location within Indiana Location within the United States
- Coordinates: 40°20′45″N 86°12′10″W
- Country: United States
- State: Indiana
- County: Tipton
- Township: Prairie
- Established: 1860
- Founded by: Enoch Smith
- Named after: B.M. Groom
- Elevation: 899 ft (274 m)
- Time zone: UTC-5 (Eastern (EST))
  - Summer (DST): UTC-4 (EDT)
- ZIP code: 46045
- Area code: 765
- GNIS feature ID: 435519

Groomsville is an unincorporated community in Prairie Township, Tipton County, in the U.S. state of Indiana.

== History ==
The area was settled by whites prior to its 1860 founding. The Liberty Baptist Church was founded in 1853 just north of the future Groomsville. Groomsville was officially founded in 1860. Enoch Smith facilitated the founding of the post office. Groomsville was named after a physician and Tipton County auditor, B.M. Groom. A general store was built in Groomsville just after its founding. The store was sold to McCreary and Stoops in 1883. John W. Kern made his first political speech in the village in 1870. The post office was discontinued in Groomsville in 1900.
