= Darrough Chapel, Indiana =

- Unincorporated community
- Location within Indiana Location within the United States
- Coordinates: 40°28′43″N 86°05′44″W
- Country: United States
- State: Indiana
- County: Howard
- Township: Center
- Elevation: 820 ft (250 m)
- ZIP code: 46901
- FIPS code: 18-16860
- GNIS feature ID: 433322

Darrough Chapel is an unincorporated community in Center Township, Howard County, Indiana, United States. Named after Darrough Chapel Church, it has existed since at least 1894 and forms part of the Kokomo, Indiana, Metropolitan Statistical Area.

Darrough Chapel lies outside the city limits of Kokomo, and according to a March 11, 2011, report in the Kokomo Perspective, "At present, Darrough Chapel is excluded from all annexation proposals that have been made by the city."
