= Taylor High School (Kokomo, Indiana) =

- Taylor High School viewed from the southwest

Location
- 3794 East County Road 300 South; Kokomo, Howard County, Indiana 46902; United States; 40°26′6″N 86°3′13″W

Information
- Type: Public high school
- School district: Taylor Community School Corporation
- Superintendent: Steve Dishon
- Principal: Brandon Gleason
- Faculty: 25.00 (FTE)
- Grades: 9-12
- Enrollment: 368 (2023-24)
- Student to teacher ratio: 14.72
- Color
- Athletics conference: Hoosier Heartland Conference
- Team name: Titans
- Website: School website

Taylor High School is a high school located in Center, Indiana, an unincorporated community approximately 5.5 miles southeast of Kokomo. It is the only high school of the Taylor Community School Corporation.

== Athletics ==
The following sports are offered at Taylor:

- Baseball (boys)
  - State champs, 2000
- Basketball (boys & girls)
- Cheerleading (boys & girls)
- Cross country (boys & girls)
- Football (boys)
- Golf (boys & girls)
- Soccer (boys & girls)
- Softball (girls)
- Tennis (boys & girls)
- Track & field (boys & girls)
- Volleyball (girls)
- Wrestling (boys & girls)

== Notable alumni ==
- Shawn Fain, President of the United Auto Workers

== See also ==
- List of high schools in Indiana
