= Clay Township, Howard County, Indiana =

Clay Township
- Township
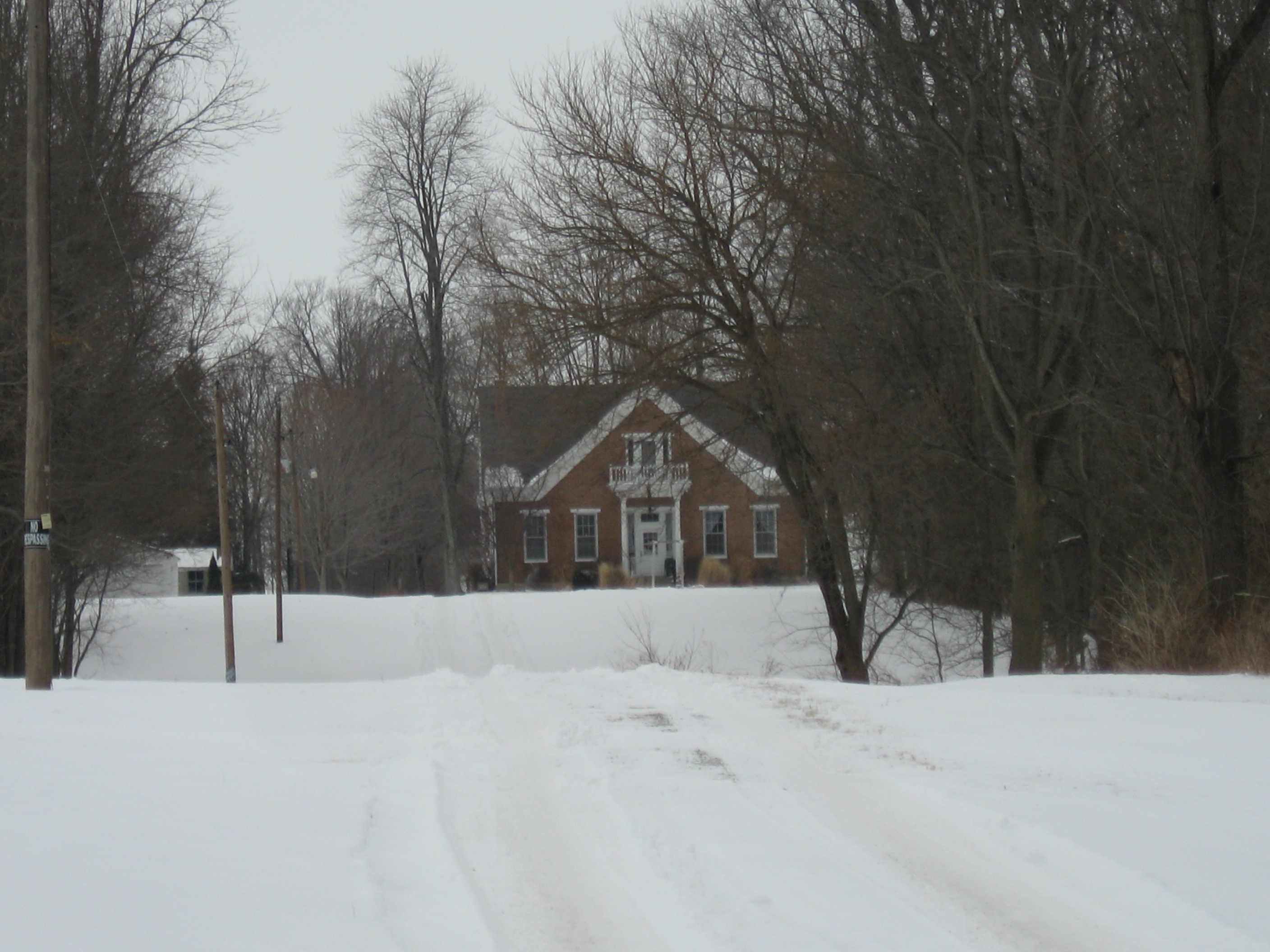
- Henry W. Smith House, a historic site in the township

- Location in Howard County
- Coordinates: 40°31′22″N 86°11′37″W
- Country: United States
- State: Indiana
- County: Howard

Government
  - Type: Indiana township

Area
  - Total: 28.74 sq mi (74.4 km^{2})
  - Land: 28.7 sq mi (74 km^{2})
  - Water: 0.04 sq mi (0.10 km^{2}) 0.14%
- Elevation: 820 ft (250 m)

Population (2020)
  - Total: 4,036
  - Density: 135.4/sq mi (52.3/km^{2})
- GNIS feature ID: 0453211

Clay Township is one of eleven townships in Howard County, Indiana, United States. As of the 2020 census, its population was 4,036, up from 3,885 in 2010. This township also contains a small portion of Kokomo. The population of the Kokomo portion, however, is zero.

== History ==
Clay Township was named for Henry Clay, a politician and statesman from Kentucky.

The Henry W. Smith House was listed on the National Register of Historic Places in 1979.

== Geography ==
Historical population
Census	Pop.	Note	%±
2000	4,042		—
2010	3,885		−3.9%
2020	4,036		3.9%
U.S. Census

According to the 2010 census, the township has a total area of 28.74 square miles (74.4 km^{2}), of which 28.7 square miles (74 km^{2}) (or 99.86%) is land and 0.04 square miles (0.10 km^{2}) (or 0.14%) is water. The stream of Villa Run runs through this township.

=== Former Settlements ===
- Jewell Station

=== Adjacent townships ===
- Jackson Township, Cass County (north)
- Deer Creek Township, Miami County (northeast)
- Howard Township (east)
- Center Township (southeast)
- Harrison Township (south)
- Monroe Township (southwest)
- Ervin Township (west)

=== Major highways ===
- US 31
- US 35
- SR 22

=== Airports and landing strips ===
- Hartman Farms Field
