= Honey Creek Township, Howard County, Indiana =

Honey Creek Township
- Township
- Location in Howard County
- Coordinates: 40°24′50″N 86°16′13″W
- Country: United States
- State: Indiana
- County: Howard

Government
  - Type: Indiana township

Area
  - Total: 14.72 sq mi (38.1 km^{2})
  - Land: 14.72 sq mi (38.1 km^{2})
  - Water: 0 sq mi (0 km^{2}) 0%
- Elevation: 850 ft (259 m)

Population (2020)
  - Total: 2,344
  - Density: 143.3/sq mi (55.3/km^{2})
- GNIS feature ID: 0453416

Honey Creek Township is one of eleven townships in Howard County, Indiana, United States. As of the 2020 census, its population was 2,344, up from 2,109 in 2010. The township is served by the Russiaville Post Office.

== History ==
Honey Creek was organized in 1841 as a township in the northeastern corner of neighboring Clinton County. The township's early population tended to be politically Republican, so the Republican party in Howard County and the Democrats in Clinton County collaborated to have Honey Creek Township removed from Clinton and added in 1850 to Howard.

== Geography ==
Historical population
Census	Pop.	Note	%±
2000	1,966		—
2010	2,109		7.3%
2020	2,344		11.1%
U.S. Census

According to the 2010 census, the township has a total area of 14.72 square miles (38.1 km^{2}), all land. The stream of Squirrel Creek runs through this township.

=== Cities and towns ===
- Russiaville

=== Adjacent townships ===
- Harrison Township (east)
- Prairie Township, Tipton County (southeast)
- Forest Township, Clinton County (southwest)
- Monroe Township (northwest)

=== Major highways ===
- SR 26

== Schools ==
- Western Intermediate School
- Western Primary School
