= Indian Heights, Indiana =

- Neighborhood
- Location in the state of Indiana
- Coordinates: 40°25′43″N 86°7′7″W
- Country: United States
- State: Indiana
- County: Howard

Area
  - Total: 0.85 sq mi (2.2 km^{2})
  - Land: 0.85 sq mi (2.2 km^{2})
  - Water: 0 sq mi (0.0 km^{2})
- Elevation: 856 ft (261 m)

Population (2010)
  - Total: 3,011
  - Density: 3,807/sq mi (1,469.9/km^{2})
- Time zone: UTC-5 (EST)
  - Summer (DST): UTC-4 (EDT)
- FIPS code: 18-36144
- GNIS feature ID: 0436762

Indian Heights is a neighborhood in Kokomo, Howard County, Indiana, United States. Indian Heights was a census-designated place (CDP) also before its annexation into Kokomo. The population was 3,011 at the 2010 census. It is part of the Kokomo, Indiana Metropolitan Statistical Area. On January 1, 2012, the neighborhood of Indian Heights was legally annexed into the city of Kokomo's corporate boundary.

Mohawk Park is the only public park in the region; however, Taylor Elementary School has a playground in the back of the school. It also has some neighborhoods, the most famous being Ojibway, Miami, Algonquin, and Mohawk, which are named after Native American tribes.

== Geography ==
Indian Heights is located at 40°25′43″N 86°07′07″W.

According to the United States Census Bureau, the CDP has a total area of 0.9 square miles (2.3 km^{2}), all land.

== History ==
Built in 1956 by Lusk Corporation and U.S. Steel, Indian Heights was long an unincorporated community and CDP outside Kokomo and grew rapidly. Kokomo annexed Indian Heights into the city in 2012, and Indian Heights now receives emergency first responder services from Kokomo rather than the county. Indian Heights still uses Taylor Schools though despite being in Kokomo since it is a part of Taylor Township.

By definition a CDP can not be an incorporated place, it can have no structured government, and has to be directly against another incorporated place, or have clearly defined natural boundaries. With that in mind Indian Heights is no longer eligible to be a CDP for Howard County. Instead it is possible for New London, Jerome, or Sycamore to take its place in the next election as they all fall under those guidelines.

== Demographics ==
As of the census of 2000, there were 3,274 people, 1,213 households, and 930 families residing in the CDP. The population density was 3,802.5 inhabitants per square mile (1,468.2/km^{2}). There were 1,262 housing units at an average density of 1,465.7 per square mile (565.9/km^{2}). The racial makeup of the CDP was 94.65% White, 2.84% African American, 0.34% Native American, 0.09% Asian, 0.46% from other races, and 1.62% from two or more races. Hispanic or Latino of any race were 2.44% of the population.

There were 1,213 households, out of which 38.7% had children under the age of 18 living with them, 57.8% were married couples living together, 14.1% had a female householder with no husband present, and 23.3% were non-families. 20.8% of all households were made up of individuals, and 8.1% had someone living alone who was 65 years of age or older. The average household size was 2.70 and the average family size was 3.10.

In the CDP, the population was spread out, with 30.4% under the age of 18, 7.5% from 18 to 24, 30.8% from 25 to 44, 21.0% from 45 to 64, and 10.2% who were 65 years of age or older. The median age was 33 years. For every 100 females, there were 97.0 males. For every 100 females age 18 and over, there were 90.6 males.

The median income for a household in the CDP was $45,444, and the median income for a family was $50,128. Males had a median income of $45,909 versus $21,250 for females. The per capita income for the CDP was $18,062. About 4.1% of families and 4.6% of the population were below the poverty line, including 6.1% of those under age 18 and 4.7% of those age 65 or over.

== Transportation ==
Since mid-2013, Indian Heights has been covered by Kokomo City-Line Trolley, as it is now part of the city. Indian Heights is on the southern loop for the Red Line.

=== Highways ===
- SR 26 to Lafayette (west) and Hartford City (east)
- SR 931 to Kokomo (north) and Indianapolis (south)
