= Russiaville, Indiana =

- Town
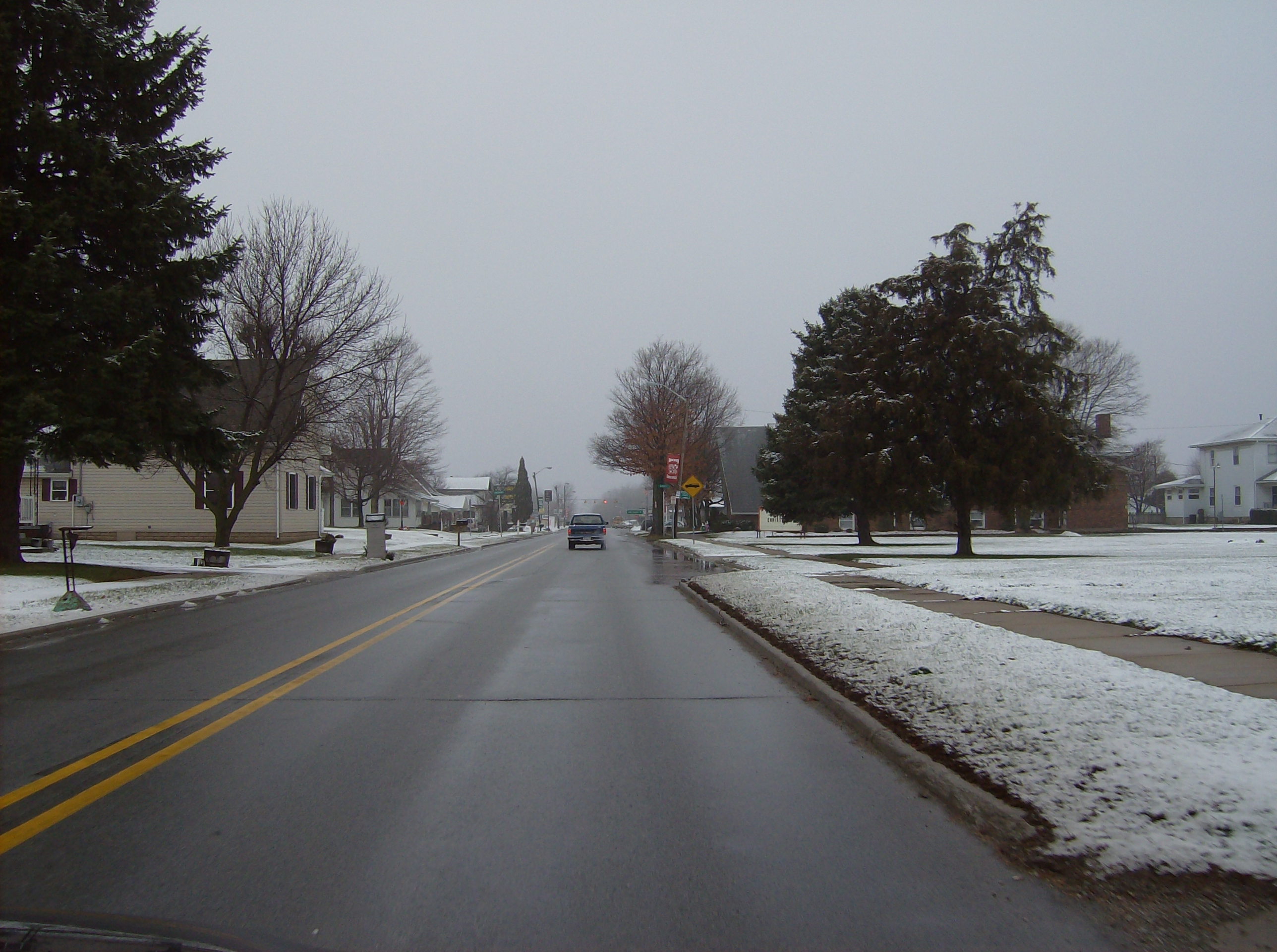
- Along Main Street in Russiaville

- Location of Russiaville in Howard County, Indiana.
- Coordinates: 40°25′08″N 86°16′22″W
- Country: United States
- State: Indiana
- County: Howard
- Township: Honey Creek
- Named for: Jean Baptiste Richardville

Area
  - Total: 0.90 sq mi (2.32 km^{2})
  - Land: 0.90 sq mi (2.32 km^{2})
  - Water: 0 sq mi (0.00 km^{2})
- Elevation: 837 ft (255 m)

Population (2020)
  - Total: 1,319
  - Density: 1,474.5/sq mi (569.32/km^{2})
- Time zone: UTC-5 (Eastern (EST))
  - Summer (DST): UTC-4 (EDT)
- ZIP code: 46979
- Area code: 765
- FIPS code: 18-66546
- GNIS feature ID: 2396895
- Website: www.townofrussiaville.com

Russiaville (/ˈruːʃəvɪl/) is a town in Honey Creek Township, Howard County, Indiana, United States. As of the 2020 census, Russiaville had a population of 1,319. It is part of the Kokomo Metropolitan Statistical Area. Russiaville was incorporated sometime between the 1860 and 1870 US Census.

== Etymology ==
The town was named for Jean Baptiste de Richardville (whose father's surname was Richerville), a Miami chief of French-Miami descent who had relations with the United States government in treaty making in the early nineteenth century. Through the French pronunciation of "Ri-shar-ville," the name was gradually changed to the current spelling; it has been pronounced "Roo-sha-ville" through much of its history.

The apparent association with Russia led to the town high school's naming its athletic teams the “Cossacks” until 1949, when county consolidation changed Russiaville High School to Western High School. Some theorize that during the Cold War, residents consciously changed the pronunciation of Russiaville's name in order to disconnect their town from Russia, the leading state of the Soviet Union, however, the pronunciation, Roo-sha-ville precedes the Cold War by many years. A map from the 1840s to the 1850s in the Quaker Collection of Earlham College in Richmond, Indiana, shows a county named Richardville, and a town Richardville, at the site of present-day Russiaville. Some local history has suggested "Rouchardville" as the earlier spelling.

== History ==
Russiaville was laid out in 1845.

Russiaville became a Quaker settlement in the years before the Civil War. They created a stop on the Underground Railroad for fugitive slaves in the antebellum years in nearby New London, then the site of the Friends Meeting serving the entire area. A local legend tells that the stop included a tunnel under New London from a safe house to a cave in the hollow of Honey Creek, near the location of the Friends Meetinghouse.

Russiaville is the birthplace of Jonathan Dixon Maxwell (September 3, 1864), builder of the Maxwell automobile. He is buried there.

Almost all of the town was destroyed by an F4 tornado on April 11, 1965, which was part of the Palm Sunday Tornado Outbreak. After rebuilding, the town had a population of 1,094 at the 2010 census.

In 1985, Ryan White was an American teenager going to the Western School District's Middle School, who was denied re-admittance to school following an AIDS diagnosis. The school district faced pressure from many parents and faculty to ban Ryan White from the campus after his diagnosis of HIV became known. The case, and local families' treatment of the White family, became a focal point in the public debate around funding for HIV treatment and public perception, eventually leading to the Ryan White CARE Act. The act provides funding to improve availability of care for low-income, uninsured and under-insured victims of AIDS and their families.

== Geography ==
According to the 2010 census, Russiaville has a total area of 0.81 square miles (2.10 km^{2}), all land.

== Demographics ==
Historical population
| Census | Pop. | Note | %± |
|---|---|---|---|
| 1870 | 160 | | — |
| 1880 | 419 | | 161.9% |
| 1890 | 603 | | 43.9% |
| 1970 | 844 | | — |
| 1980 | 973 | | 15.3% |
| 1990 | 1,014 | | 4.2% |
| 2000 | 1,092 | | 7.7% |
| 2010 | 1,094 | | 0.2% |
| 2020 | 1,319 | | 20.6% |
U.S. Decennial Census

=== 2020 census ===
As of the 2020 census, Russiaville had a population of 1,319. The median age was 35.3 years. 29.0% of residents were under the age of 18 and 13.0% of residents were 65 years of age or older. For every 100 females there were 95.7 males, and for every 100 females age 18 and over there were 88.3 males age 18 and over.

0.0% of residents lived in urban areas, while 100.0% lived in rural areas.

There were 481 households in Russiaville, of which 40.3% had children under the age of 18 living in them. Of all households, 55.3% were married-couple households, 14.3% were households with a male householder and no spouse or partner present, and 24.7% were households with a female householder and no spouse or partner present. About 20.3% of all households were made up of individuals and 10.0% had someone living alone who was 65 years of age or older.

There were 519 housing units, of which 7.3% were vacant. The homeowner vacancy rate was 2.0% and the rental vacancy rate was 3.6%.

Racial composition as of the 2020 census
| Race | Number | Percent |
|---|---|---|
| White | 1,223 | 92.7% |
| Black or African American | 6 | 0.5% |
| American Indian and Alaska Native | 4 | 0.3% |
| Asian | 3 | 0.2% |
| Native Hawaiian and Other Pacific Islander | 0 | 0.0% |
| Some other race | 11 | 0.8% |
| Two or more races | 72 | 5.5% |
| Hispanic or Latino (of any race) | 46 | 3.5% |

=== 2010 census ===
As of the census of 2010, there were 1,094 people, 434 households, and 307 families residing in the town. The population density was 1,350.6 inhabitants per square mile (521.5/km^{2}). There were 486 housing units at an average density of 600.0 per square mile (231.7/km^{2}). The racial makeup of the town was 98.6% White, 0.2% African American, 0.2% Native American, 0.2% Asian, 0.1% from other races, and 0.7% from two or more races. Hispanic or Latino of any race were 1.3% of the population.

There were 434 households, of which 39.2% had children under the age of 18 living with them, 55.1% were married couples living together, 11.8% had a female householder with no husband present, 3.9% had a male householder with no wife present, and 29.3% were non-families. 27.9% of all households were made up of individuals, and 11.9% had someone living alone who was 65 years of age or older. The average household size was 2.52 people and the average family size was 3.06 people.

The median age in the town was 37.1 years. 27.9% of residents were under the age of 18; 6.7% were between the ages of 18 and 24; 27.8% were from 25 to 44; 25.1% were from 45 to 64; and 12.6% were 65 years of age or older. The gender makeup of the town was 49.1% male and 50.9% female.

=== 2000 census ===
As of the census of 2000, there were 1,092 people, 425 households, and 317 families residing in the town. The population density was 1,361.4 inhabitants per square mile (525.6/km^{2}). There were 446 housing units at an average density of 556.0 per square mile (214.7/km^{2}). The racial makeup of the town was 99.08% White, 0.09% Native American, 0.18% Asian, 0.27% from other races, and 0.37% from two or more races. Hispanic or Latino of any race were 1.28% of the population.

There were 425 households, out of which 39.8% had children under the age of 18 living with them, 60.0% were married couples living together, 11.5% had a female householder with no husband present, and 25.2% were non-families. 24.0% of all households were made up of individuals, and 12.2% had someone living alone who was 65 years of age or older. The average household size was 2.57 and the average family size was 3.04.

In the town, the population was spread out, with 29.3% under the age of 18, 8.1% from 18 to 24, 31.6% from 25 to 44, 19.0% from 45 to 64, and 12.1% who were 65 years of age or older. The median age was 34 years. For every 100 females, there were 92.9 males. For every 100 females age 18 and over, there were 91.6 males.

The median income for a household in the town was $40,875, and the median income for a family was $46,094. Males had a median income of $38,833 versus $25,875 for females. The per capita income for the town was $20,804. About 4.4% of families and 5.7% of the population were below the poverty line, including 7.6% of those under age 18 and 4.4% of those age 65 or over.

== Education ==
=== School districts ===
- Western School Corporation (K-12)

Western High School competes in the Hoosier Conference for athletics.

=== Public library ===
Russiaville has a public library, a branch of the Kokomo-Howard County Public Library.

== Movies filmed in Russiaville ==
- The Ryan White Story (1988), starring Judith Light and Lukas Haas

== Government ==
Town Council Members include: Jeff Lipinski, President Don Parvin, Vice President Pat Reel, Council Member Greg Landrum, Council Member Myrna Claar, Council Member Karen Smith Corbin King, Town Attorney Megan Reel, Town Clerk/Treasurer

== See also ==
- Russiaville Interurban Depot — listed on the National Register of Historic Places
