= Howard Township, Howard County, Indiana =

Howard Township
- Township
- Location in Howard County
- Coordinates: 40°31′44″N 86°03′31″W
- Country: United States
- State: Indiana
- County: Howard

Government
  - Type: Indiana township

Area
  - Total: 30.05 sq mi (77.8 km^{2})
  - Land: 29.65 sq mi (76.8 km^{2})
  - Water: 0.4 sq mi (1.0 km^{2}) 1.33%
- Elevation: 820 ft (250 m)

Population (2020)
  - Total: 2,436
  - Density: 87/sq mi (34/km^{2})
- GNIS feature ID: 0453419

Howard Township is one of eleven townships in Howard County, Indiana, United States. As of the 2020 census, its population was 2,436, down from 2,579 in 2010.

Historical population
Census	Pop.	Note	%±
2000	2,866		—
2010	2,579		−10.0%
2020	2,436		−5.5%
U.S. Census

== History ==
Howard Township and Howard County are both named for Tilghman Howard, an Indiana congressman.

== Geography ==
According to the 2010 census, the township has a total area of 30.05 square miles (77.8 km^{2}), of which 29.65 square miles (76.8 km^{2}) (or 98.67%) is land and 0.4 square miles (1.0 km^{2}) (or 1.33%) is water.

=== Unincorporated towns ===
- Cassville
- Vermont

=== Adjacent townships ===
- Clay Township, Miami County (north)
- Harrison Township, Miami County (northeast)
- Liberty Township (east)
- Taylor Township (south)
- Center Township (southwest)
- Clay Township (west)
- Deer Creek Township, Miami County (northwest)

=== Cemeteries ===
The township contains three cemeteries: Hopewell, Hudson and Salem.

=== Major highways ===
- U.S. Route 31
- U.S. Route 35

=== Airports and landing strips ===
- Kokomo Municipal Airport
- Medallion Field
