= Ervin Township, Howard County, Indiana =

Ervin Township
- Township
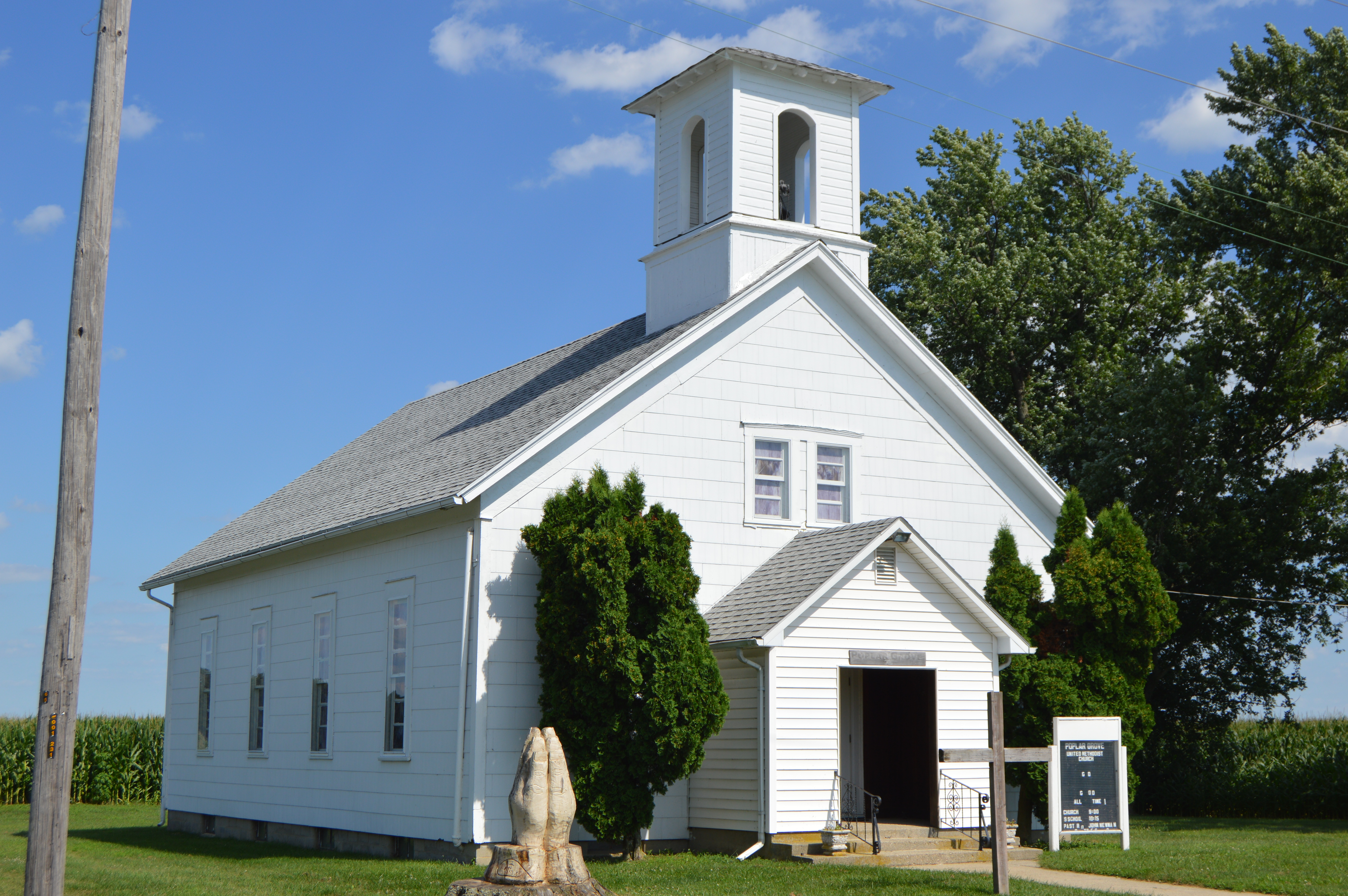
- Former Poplar Grove Methodist Church

- Location in Howard County
- Coordinates: 40°31′20″N 86°18′33″W
- Country: United States
- State: Indiana
- County: Howard

Government
  - Type: Indiana township

Area
  - Total: 42.24 sq mi (109.4 km^{2})
  - Land: 42.24 sq mi (109.4 km^{2})
  - Water: 0 sq mi (0 km^{2}) 0%
- Elevation: 791 ft (241 m)

Population (2020)
  - Total: 2,143
  - Density: 52.7/sq mi (20.3/km^{2})
- GNIS feature ID: 0453279

Ervin Township is one of eleven townships in Howard County, Indiana, United States. As of the 2020 census, its population was 2,143, down from 2,227 in 2010.

== History ==
Ervin township was named for Robert Ervin, a county judge.

In the mid-1800s, the township was home to two African American settlements, the Rush Settlement and the Bassett Settlement. The Bassett settlement was the home of Richard Bassett, a Baptist minister who later became the third African-American state representative in Indiana history, and the first from Howard County.

== Geography ==
Historical population
Census	Pop.	Note	%±
2000	2,331		—
2010	2,227		−4.5%
2020	2,143		−3.8%
U.S. Census

According to the 2010 census, the township has a total area of 42.24 square miles (109.4 km^{2}), all land. The stream of Petes Run runs through this township.

=== Unincorporated towns ===
- Judson
- Kappa Corner
- Poplar Grove
- Ridgeway

(This list is based on USGS data and may include former settlements.)

=== Former Settlements ===
- Bassett
- Ervin
- Noble

=== Adjacent townships ===
- Deer Creek Township, Cass County (north)
- Jackson Township, Cass County (northeast)
- Clay Township (east)
- Monroe Township (south)
- Burlington Township, Carroll County (west)
- Carrollton Township, Carroll County (west)

=== Cemeteries ===
The township contains ten cemeteries: Barnett, Brown, Kappa, Mound, North Union, Petes Run, Pickett, Price, Rush and South Union.

=== Major highways ===
- SR 22
