= New London, Indiana =

- Unincorporated community and Census-designated place
- Location within Indiana Location within the United States
- Coordinates: 40°26′35″N 86°16′26″W
- Country: United States
- State: Indiana
- County: Howard
- Township: Monroe
- Elevation: 827 ft (252 m)
- ZIP code: 46979
- FIPS code: 18-53190
- GNIS feature ID: 2830415

New London is an unincorporated community, and former incorporated town, in Monroe Township, Howard County, Indiana, United States. It is part of the Kokomo, Indiana, Metropolitan Statistical Area.

== History ==
New London was laid out and platted in 1845. It was incorporated as a town in 1848. In the 1870 census in had 240 people in the town. Although by the next census New London was unincorporated and Greentown had replaced it as the county's third incorporated place.

== Demographics ==
The United States Census Bureau defined New London as a census designated place in the 2022 American Community Survey.
