= Howard County, Indiana =

County in Indiana, United States

- County
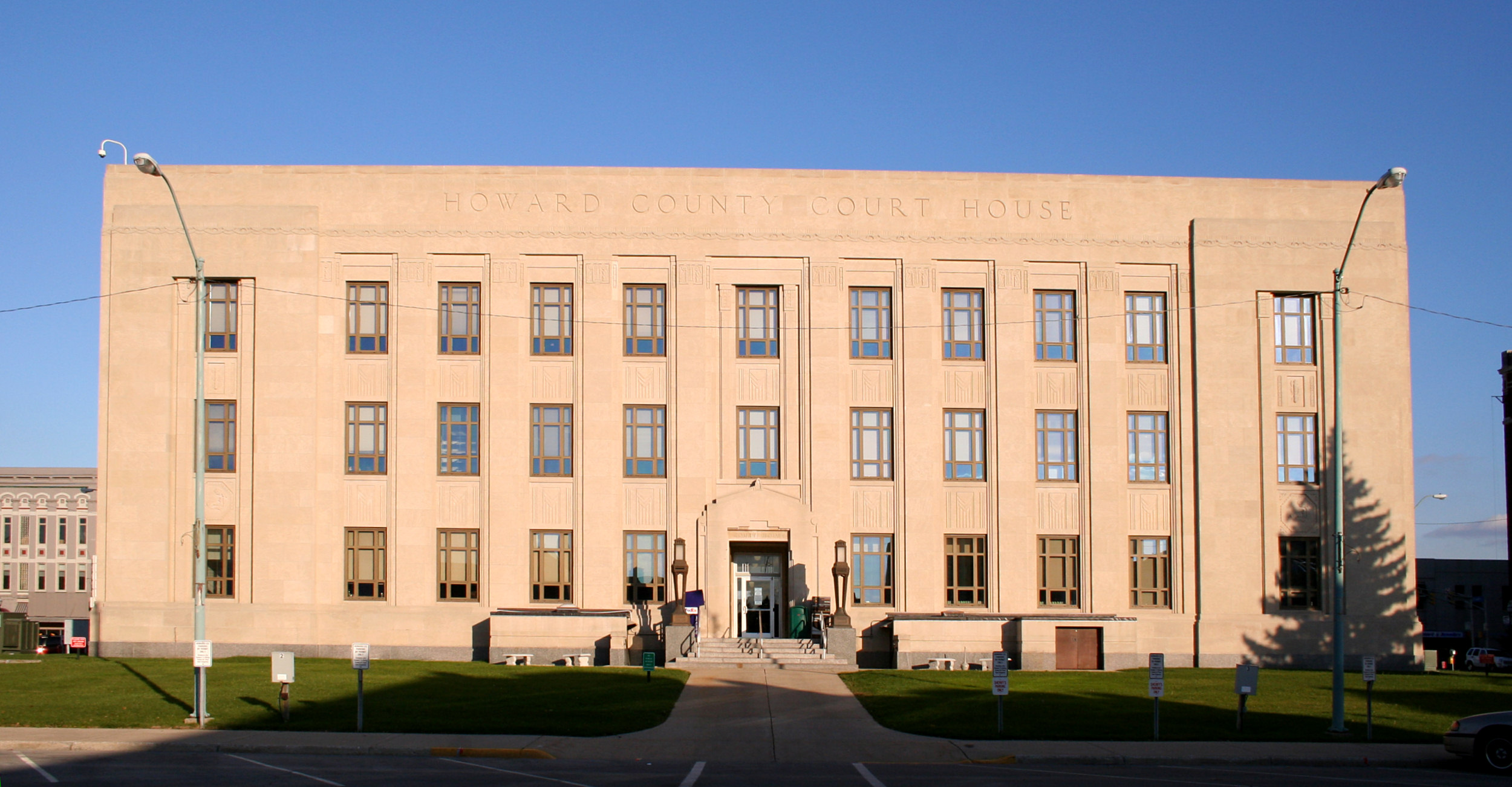
- Howard County Courthouse in Kokomo, Indiana

- Seal

- Location within the U.S. state of Indiana
- Coordinates: 40°29′N 86°07′W
- Country: United States
- State: Indiana
- Founded: 1844
- Named for: Tilghman Howard
- Seat: Kokomo
- Largest city: Kokomo

Area
  - Total: 293.92 sq mi (761.2 km^{2})
  - Land: 293.06 sq mi (759.0 km^{2})
  - Water: 0.86 sq mi (2.2 km^{2}) 0.29%

Population (2020)
  - Total: 83,658
  - Estimate (2025): 83,904 ▲
  - Density: 285.46/sq mi (110.22/km^{2})
- Time zone: UTC−5 (Eastern)
  - Summer (DST): UTC−4 (EDT)
- Congressional districts: 4th, 5th
- Website: www.in.gov/counties/howard/
- Indiana county number 34

Howard County is one of 92 counties in the U.S. state of Indiana. As of the 2020 census, its population was 83,658. The county seat is Kokomo. Originally named Richardville County, it was renamed in 1846 to commemorate General Tilghman Ashurst Howard.

Howard County comprises the Kokomo metropolitan statistical area, as defined by the United States Census Bureau. Kokomo is also the principal city of the area known as North Central Indiana, the area around Kokomo with economic ties. The six-county area including Cass, Clinton, Fulton, Howard, Miami, and Tipton had a population of 228,331 people in 2010.

== Geography ==
According to the 2010 census, the county has a total area of 293.92 square miles (761.2 km^{2}), of which 0.86 sq mi (2.2 km^{2}) (or 0.29%) is covered by water.

=== Adjacent counties ===
- Miami County, Indiana (North)
- Grant County, Indiana (East)
- Tipton County, Indiana (South)
- Clinton County, Indiana (Southwest)
- Carroll County, Indiana (West)
- Cass County, Indiana (Northwest)

== History ==
This county was organized in 1844. It was first known as Richardville County. Its first name honored Jean Baptiste Richardville, a chief of the Miami. Richardville's name was Pe-che-wa, which translates to “Wildcat”, hence Wildcat Creek.

In 1846, the name was changed to Howard County, in honor of Gen. Tilghman Howard, U.S. representative from Indiana, who died in 1844.

== Notable locations ==
- Kokomo Reservoir (Wildcat Creek Reservoir)
- Western Days Festival: First week of June, in Russiaville, Indiana
- Howard County 4-H Fair, in Greentown, Indiana
- Koh-Koh-Mah and Foster Living History Encampment in mid-September
- Kokomo-Howard County Public Library

== Climate and weather ==
Kokomo, Indiana

Climate chart (precipitation, max. and min. temperature)
| J | F | M | A | M | J | J | A | S | O | N | D |
| 2.5 30 15 | 2.3 36 19 | 3.3 47 28 | 3.7 60 38 | 4.1 71 49 | 4 81 58 | 4.4 84 62 | 4.2 82 60 | 3.1 76 52 | 3 64 41 | 3.6 49 32 | 3.2 36 21 |
- █ Average max. and min. temperatures in °F
- █ Precipitation totals in inches
- Source: The Weather Channel
Metric conversion
| J | F | M | A | M | J | J | A | S | O | N | D |
| 64 −1 −9 | 58 2 −7 | 84 8 −2 | 95 16 3 | 105 22 9 | 101 27 14 | 111 29 17 | 107 28 16 | 80 24 11 | 77 18 5 | 92 9 0 | 81 2 −6 |
- █ Average max. and min. temperatures in °C
- █ Precipitation totals in mm

In recent years, average temperatures in Kokomo have ranged from a low of 15 °F (−9 °C) in January to a high of 84 °F (29 °C) in July, although a record low of −26 °F (−32 °C) was recorded in January 1985 and a record high of 110 °F (43 °C) was recorded in July 1936. Average monthly precipitation ranged from 2.29 inches (58 mm) in February to 4.37 inches (111 mm) in July.

== Government ==
United States presidential election results for Howard County, Indiana
| Year | Republican | | Democratic | | Third party(ies) | |
| Year | No. | % | No. | % | No. | % |
|---|---|---|---|---|---|---|
| 1888 | 3,604 | 58.87% | 2,202 | 35.97% | 316 | 5.16% |
| 1892 | 3,576 | 51.09% | 2,331 | 33.30% | 1,092 | 15.60% |
| 1896 | 4,195 | 55.59% | 3,191 | 42.29% | 160 | 2.12% |
| 1900 | 4,308 | 56.65% | 2,823 | 37.12% | 474 | 6.23% |
| 1904 | 5,014 | 61.18% | 2,098 | 25.60% | 1,084 | 13.23% |
| 1908 | 4,423 | 50.60% | 3,497 | 40.01% | 821 | 9.39% |
| 1912 | 2,152 | 24.35% | 2,824 | 31.95% | 3,863 | 43.70% |
| 1916 | 4,777 | 47.38% | 3,934 | 39.02% | 1,371 | 13.60% |
| 1920 | 10,379 | 58.54% | 5,767 | 32.53% | 1,584 | 8.93% |
| 1924 | 10,438 | 60.05% | 5,451 | 31.36% | 1,494 | 8.59% |
| 1928 | 12,632 | 66.89% | 5,930 | 31.40% | 323 | 1.71% |
| 1932 | 9,257 | 44.62% | 10,541 | 50.81% | 946 | 4.56% |
| 1936 | 9,534 | 42.67% | 12,288 | 54.99% | 524 | 2.34% |
| 1940 | 11,855 | 47.82% | 12,655 | 51.04% | 283 | 1.14% |
| 1944 | 11,515 | 49.49% | 11,224 | 48.24% | 526 | 2.26% |
| 1948 | 10,874 | 44.64% | 12,937 | 53.10% | 551 | 2.26% |
| 1952 | 15,212 | 53.34% | 12,938 | 45.37% | 367 | 1.29% |
| 1956 | 17,234 | 58.26% | 12,159 | 41.10% | 188 | 0.64% |
| 1960 | 17,938 | 56.94% | 13,415 | 42.58% | 149 | 0.47% |
| 1964 | 12,897 | 41.68% | 17,809 | 57.56% | 235 | 0.76% |
| 1968 | 15,905 | 50.39% | 11,026 | 34.93% | 4,635 | 14.68% |
| 1972 | 23,089 | 73.67% | 8,083 | 25.79% | 169 | 0.54% |
| 1976 | 19,571 | 56.48% | 14,815 | 42.75% | 267 | 0.77% |
| 1980 | 21,272 | 59.24% | 12,916 | 35.97% | 1,722 | 4.80% |
| 1984 | 22,386 | 67.74% | 10,458 | 31.65% | 202 | 0.61% |
| 1988 | 19,971 | 63.16% | 11,518 | 36.43% | 131 | 0.41% |
| 1992 | 15,306 | 44.57% | 10,288 | 29.96% | 8,746 | 25.47% |
| 1996 | 16,771 | 50.51% | 11,999 | 36.14% | 4,436 | 13.36% |
| 2000 | 20,331 | 59.63% | 12,899 | 37.83% | 865 | 2.54% |
| 2004 | 23,714 | 64.06% | 12,998 | 35.11% | 309 | 0.83% |
| 2008 | 20,248 | 52.14% | 17,871 | 46.02% | 714 | 1.84% |
| 2012 | 20,327 | 56.01% | 15,135 | 41.70% | 829 | 2.28% |
| 2016 | 23,675 | 63.40% | 11,215 | 30.03% | 2,452 | 6.57% |
| 2020 | 26,449 | 65.10% | 13,303 | 32.74% | 878 | 2.16% |
| 2024 | 25,871 | 66.51% | 12,197 | 31.36% | 829 | 2.13% |

The county government is a constitutional body, and is granted specific powers by the Constitution of Indiana and the Indiana Code.

County Council: The county council is the legislative branch of the county government and controls all the spending and revenue collection in the county. Representatives are elected from county districts. The council members serve four-year terms. They are responsible for setting salaries, the annual budget, and special spending. The council also has limited authority to impose local taxes, in the form of an income and property taxes that are subject to state level approval, excise taxes, and service taxes.

Board of Commissioners: The executive body of the county is made of a board of commissioners, who are elected county-wide, in staggered terms, and each serves a four-year term. One of the commissioners, typically the most senior, serves as president. The commissioners are charged with executing the acts legislated by the council, collecting revenue, and managing the day-to-day functions of the county government.

Court: The county maintains five courts: Circuit Court, Superior Court I, Superior Court II, Superior Court III, and Superior Court IV. The judge on the court is elected to a term of four years and must be admitted to practice law in the State of Indiana. In some cases, court decisions can be appealed to the Indiana Court of Appeals.

County officials: The county has several other elected offices, including sheriff, coroner, auditor, treasurer, recorder, surveyor, and circuit court clerk Each of these elected officers serves a term of four years and oversees a different part of county government. Members elected to county government positions are required to declare party affiliations and to be residents of the county.

Howard County is part of Indiana's 2nd congressional district and Indiana's 5th congressional district; Indiana Senate districts 7 and 21; and Indiana House of Representatives districts 30, 32 and 38.

== Combined statistical area ==
The Kokomo–Peru combined statistical area (CSA) was made up of three counties in Indiana. The CSA includes one metropolitan area and one micropolitan area. As of the 2000 Census, the CSA had a population of 137,623 (though a July 1, 2009 estimate placed the population at 134,788). A 2013 population estimate placed the combined statistical area at 118,900, which further leads to the idea that the Kokomo metropolitan area now only includes Howard County. When the 2023 metropolitan definition were released, the Kokomo–Peru CSA was dissolved and its counties were added to the Indianapolis–Carmel–Muncie combined statistical area.

=== Components ===
- Metropolitan statistical areas
  - Kokomo (Howard and Tipton counties)
- Micropolitan statistical areas
  - Peru (Miami County)

== Transportation ==
=== Airports ===
- Kokomo Municipal Airport

=== Highways ===
- US 31
- US 35
- SR 19
- SR 22
- SR 26
- SR 213
- SR 931

=== Bus services ===
- City-Line Trolley Serves the city of Kokomo. It is a fixed transportation route that is free to ride and has free wifi.
- Trailways A service running from Indianapolis through Kokomo, and then to South Bend.
- Greyhound Lines A nationwide service, the Kokomo stop is at the Marathon gas station on North Reed Road, and Gano Street.

=== Walking trails ===
- Walk Of Excellence – serves the city of Kokomo.
- Industrial Heritage Trail – serves the city of Kokomo.
- Nickel Plate Trail – ends in northern Howard County in unincorporated community, Cassville. Connects directly to Industrial Heritage Trail in Kokomo.
- Cloverleaf Trail - Serves the West side to downtown of the city of Kokomo.
- Comet Trail – serves the town of Greentown, and is exactly one mile in length.
- Historic Downtown Trail – serves the city of Greentown, marked with information about Greentown's history.

== Education ==
=== Colleges and universities ===
- Indiana University Kokomo (IUK)
- Indiana Wesleyan University – Kokomo Campus
- Ivy Tech Community College
- Purdue College of Technology

==== Public school districts ====
- Kokomo-Center Township Consolidated School Corporation (K–12, Kokomo, Indiana) Kokomo High School (NCC)
- Eastern Howard School Corporation (K–12, Greentown, Indiana) (MIC)
- Northwestern School Corporation (K–12) (MIC)
- Taylor Community School Corporation (K–12, Indian Heights, Indiana) (MIC)
- Western School Corporation (K–12, Russiaville, Indiana) (MIC)

==== Private schools ====
- Redeemer Lutheran School (K–8)
- Sts. Joan of Arc and St. Patrick Catholic School (K–8)
- Temple Christian School (K–12)
- Victory Christian Academy (K–12)
- Acacia Academy (K–8)

== Demographics ==
Historical population
| Census | Pop. | Note | %± |
|---|---|---|---|
| 1850 | 6,657 | | — |
| 1860 | 12,524 | | 88.1% |
| 1870 | 15,847 | | 26.5% |
| 1880 | 19,584 | | 23.6% |
| 1890 | 26,186 | | 33.7% |
| 1900 | 28,575 | | 9.1% |
| 1910 | 33,177 | | 16.1% |
| 1920 | 43,965 | | 32.5% |
| 1930 | 46,696 | | 6.2% |
| 1940 | 47,752 | | 2.3% |
| 1950 | 54,498 | | 14.1% |
| 1960 | 69,509 | | 27.5% |
| 1970 | 83,198 | | 19.7% |
| 1980 | 86,896 | | 4.4% |
| 1990 | 80,827 | | −7.0% |
| 2000 | 84,964 | | 5.1% |
| 2010 | 82,752 | | −2.6% |
| 2020 | 83,658 | | 1.1% |
| 2025 (est.) | 83,904 | ▲ | 0.3% |
U.S. Decennial Census; 1790-1960 1900-1990; 1990-2000 2010-2013 2020

=== Racial and ethnic composition ===
Howard County, Indiana – Racial and ethnic composition Note: the US Census treats Hispanic/Latino as an ethnic category. This table excludes Latinos from the racial categories and assigns them to a separate category. Hispanics/Latinos may be of any race.
| Race / Ethnicity (NH = Non-Hispanic) | Pop 1980 | Pop 1990 | Pop 2000 | Pop 2010 | Pop 2020 | % 1980 | % 1990 | % 2000 | % 2010 | % 2020 |
|---|---|---|---|---|---|---|---|---|---|---|
| White alone (NH) | 81,122 | 74,706 | 75,378 | 72,091 | 68,470 | 93.36% | 92.43% | 88.72% | 87.12% | 81.85% |
| Black or African American alone (NH) | 4,257 | 4,365 | 5,523 | 5,585 | 6,416 | 4.90% | 5.40% | 6.50% | 6.75% | 7.67% |
| Native American or Alaska Native alone (NH) | 184 | 213 | 280 | 246 | 209 | 0.21% | 0.26% | 0.33% | 0.30% | 0.25% |
| Asian alone (NH) | 271 | 444 | 856 | 737 | 1,027 | 0.31% | 0.55% | 1.01% | 0.89% | 1.23% |
| Native Hawaiian or Pacific Islander alone (NH) | x | x | 13 | 13 | 19 | x | x | 0.02% | 0.02% | 0.02% |
| Other race alone (NH) | 123 | 42 | 125 | 136 | 306 | 0.14% | 0.05% | 0.15% | 0.16% | 0.37% |
| Mixed race or Multiracial (NH) | x | x | 1,080 | 1,741 | 4,151 | x | x | 1.27% | 2.10% | 4.96% |
| Hispanic or Latino (any race) | 939 | 1,057 | 1,709 | 2,203 | 3,060 | 1.08% | 1.31% | 2.01% | 2.66% | 3.66% |
| Total | 86,896 | 80,827 | 84,964 | 82,752 | 83,658 | 100.00% | 100.00% | 100.00% | 100.00% | 100.00% |

=== 2020 census ===
As of the 2020 census, the county had a population of 83,658. The median age was 41.7 years. 22.1% of residents were under the age of 18 and 20.0% of residents were 65 years of age or older. For every 100 females there were 93.7 males, and for every 100 females age 18 and over there were 90.7 males age 18 and over.

The racial makeup of the county was 83.1% White, 7.8% Black or African American, 0.3% American Indian and Alaska Native, 1.2% Asian, <0.1% Native Hawaiian and Pacific Islander, 1.3% from some other race, and 6.2% from two or more races. Hispanic or Latino residents of any race comprised 3.7% of the population.

74.3% of residents lived in urban areas, while 25.7% lived in rural areas.

There were 35,711 households in the county, of which 27.2% had children under the age of 18 living in them. Of all households, 43.6% were married-couple households, 19.3% were households with a male householder and no spouse or partner present, and 30.2% were households with a female householder and no spouse or partner present. About 32.3% of all households were made up of individuals and 14.4% had someone living alone who was 65 years of age or older.

There were 39,605 housing units, of which 9.8% were vacant. Among occupied housing units, 68.3% were owner-occupied and 31.7% were renter-occupied. The homeowner vacancy rate was 2.3% and the rental vacancy rate was 11.2%.

=== 2010 census ===
As of the 2010 United States census, there were 82,752 people, 34,301 households, and 22,604 families residing in the county. The population density was 282.4 inhabitants per square mile (109.0/km^{2}). There were 38,679 housing units at an average density of 132.0 per square mile (51.0/km^{2}). The racial makeup of the county was 88.6% white, 6.9% black or African American, 0.9% Asian, 0.3% American Indian, 0.8% from other races, and 2.5% from two or more races. Those of Hispanic or Latino origin made up 2.7% of the population. In terms of ancestry, 22.4% were German, 15.3% were American, 10.8% were English, and 10.2% were Irish.

Of the 34,301 households, 30.7% had children under the age of 18 living with them, 48.3% were married couples living together, 13.1% had a female householder with no husband present, 34.1% were non-families, and 29.4% of all households were made up of individuals. The average household size was 2.38 and the average family size was 2.92. The median age was 40.7 years.

The median income for a household in the county was $47,697 and the median income for a family was $55,479. Males had a median income of $50,838 versus $33,196 for females. The per capita income for the county was $23,759. About 13.1% of families and 16.4% of the population were below the poverty line, including 26.9% of those under age 18 and 4.3% of those age 65 or over.

== Communities ==
=== City ===
- Kokomo

=== Towns ===
- Greentown
- Russiaville

=== Former census-designated place ===
- Indian Heights

=== Townships ===
- Center
- Clay
- Ervin
- Harrison
- Honey Creek
- Howard
- Jackson
- Liberty
- Monroe
- Taylor
- Union

=== Other places ===
- Alto
- Cassville
- Center
- Darrough Chapel
- Hemlock
- New London
- Oakford
- Phlox
- West Middleton

== See also ==
- National Register of Historic Places listings in Howard County, Indiana
- List of counties in Indiana
