= Mid-Indiana Conference =

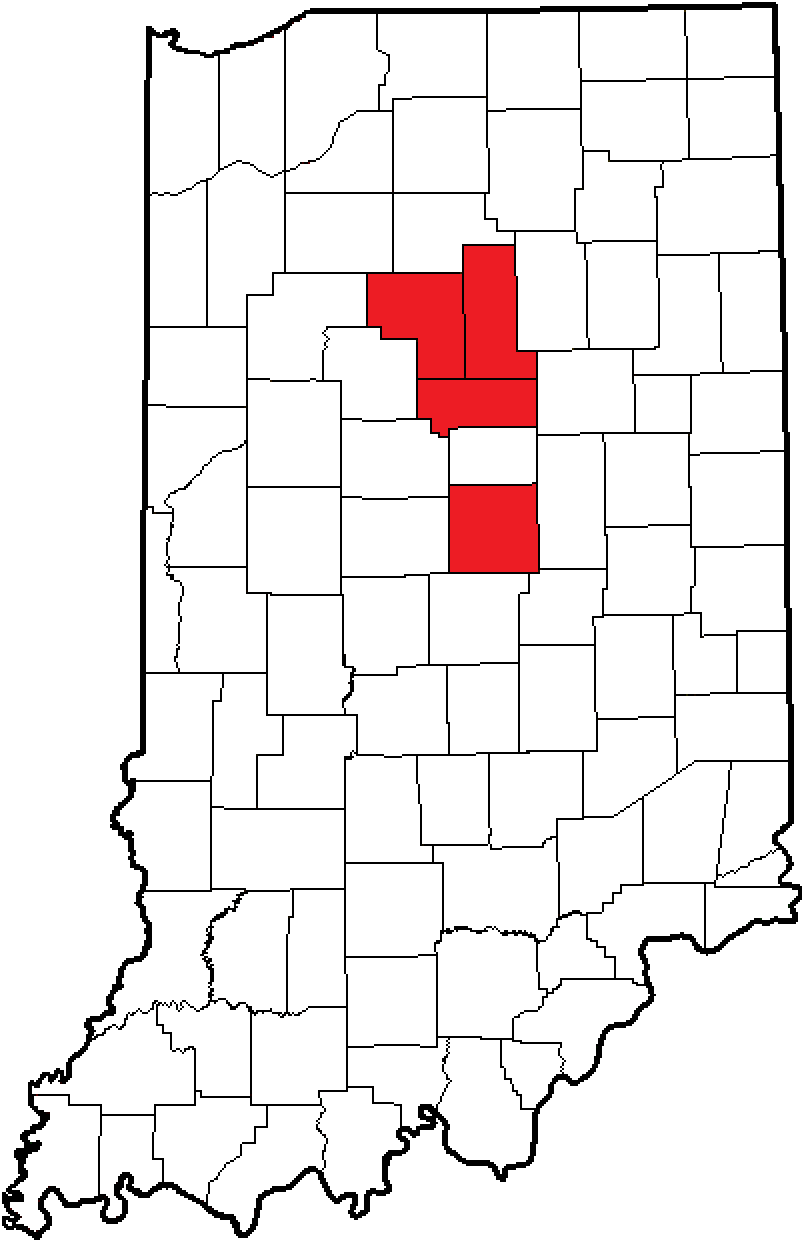
The Mid-Indiana Conference within Indiana

The Mid-Indiana Conference, or MIC, was a high school athletic conference which was located in northcentral Indiana, USA. This conference served many high schools located in Cass, Hamilton, Howard, and Miami Counties. The conference dissolved at the end on the 2014–15 academic school year.

== History ==
The Mid-Indiana Conference can trace its roots back to the late 1940s, when school consolidation reduced the Howard County Conference from nine schools to three in the matter of three years. These three remaining schools joined three nearby schools from Miami County and began the new Howard-Miami Conference. The conference renamed itself the Tri-County Conference in 1955, as two schools from Grant County joined. Further school consolidation reduced membership to four schools by 1965, forcing the conference to reach out of its footprint to find similar-sized schools. This expansion also brought with it the change to its current and final name.

Though only one member has consolidated since the MIC name has taken hold, geography, size differences, and competitiveness have all caused various roster changes through the years, with membership as many as nine schools and as few as six. However, membership stabilized after 2000, when Hamilton Heights joined from the folding Rangeline Conference. This ended in 2015, as Eastern and Taylor elected to join an expanding Hoosier Heartland Conference. Maconaquah and Peru are also leaving to join the Three Rivers Conference, while the four remaining schools are off to the Hoosier Athletic Conference.

== Membership ==
School	Location	Mascot	Colors	# / County	Year joined	Previous conference	Year left	Conference joined
Eastern (Greentown)	Greentown	Comets		34; Howard	1965; 1987	Tri-County; Three Rivers	1980; 2015	Three Rivers; Hoosier Heartland
Maconaquah	Bunker Hill	Braves		52; Miami	1965	Tri-County	2015	Three Rivers
Fairmount	Fairmount	Quakers		27; Grant	1965	Mississinewa Valley	1970	none (consolidated into Madison-Grant)
North; Miami	Denver	Warriors		52; Miami	1965	Independent (new school 1961)	1972	Three Rivers
Northwestern	Kokomo	Tigers		34; Howard	1965	Tri-County	2015	Hoosier
Oak Hill	Converse	Golden Eagles		27; Grant	1965	Tri-County	1980	Three Rivers
Southwood	Wabash	Knights		85; Wabash	1965	Independent (new school 1962)	1976	Three Rivers
Western	Russiaville	Panthers		34; Howard	1965	Hoosier	2015	Hoosier
Cass	Walton	Kings		09; Cass	1968	Independents (new school 1963)	2015	Hoosier
Taylor	Center	Titans		34; Howard	1974	Rangeline	2015	Hoosier Heartland
Eastbrook	Marion	Panthers		27; Grant	1977	Mississinewa Valley	1998	Central Indiana
Peru	Peru	Tigers		52; Miami	1998	Central Indiana	2015	Three Rivers
Hamilton; Heights	Arcadia	Huskies		29; Hamilton	2000	Rangeline	2015	Hoosier

== 2006-2007 Boys' Basketball ==
- Western, Frankfort Sectional 3A Champions
- Lewis Cass, Manchester Sectional 2A Champions
- Northwestern, Taylor Sectional 2A Champions, Blackford Regional 2A Champions, Warsaw Semi-State 2A Champions, 2A State Champions

== State titles ==
=== Eastern Comets ===
- Softball- 1A (2003)
- Softball- 2A (2005)
- Boys' Golf (2001)
- Jeremy Ashcraft - Pole Vault (1994)
- Bethany Neeley - 1600 Meters (2012)
- Brittany Neeley - 800 Meters (2013)
- Bethany Neeley - 1600 Meters (2013)
- Jessica Sprinkles, Sarah Wagner, Brittany Neeley, Bethany Neeley - 4 x 800 Relay (2013)

=== Hamilton Heights Huskies ===
- Sierra Brown - 100M Hurdles (2013)

=== Lewis Cass Kings ===
- Basketball- 2A (2003)
- Softball- 2A (2006)
- Softball- 2A (2008)

=== Maconaquah Braves ===
- Daron Pearce - 100Yd (1992–1993), 200Yd Freestyle (1993)

=== Northwestern Tigers ===
- Basketball- 2A (2007)

=== Peru Tigers ===
- Tennis (1971)

=== Taylor Titans ===
- Baseball- 2A (2000)

=== Western Panthers ===
- Joe Swartz, Wrestling, 98 lbs (1977)
- Ray Shepherd, Wrestling, 138 lbs (1984)
- Jeff Glick, Swimming, 200 Individual Medley (1985)
- Michelle Faulkner, Track & Field, 800 Meters (1988)
- Chad Shepherd, Wrestling, 135 lbs (1991)
- Kylee Wells, Diving, (2000)
- Ted Brown, Swimming, 200 Individual Medley, 500 Freestyle, Herman F. Keller Mental Attitude Award (2003)
- Brandon Youngdale, High Jump (2006)
- Girls' Golf (2001)
- Baseball-3A (2012)
- Girls'-3A Basketball

== State Runner-Ups ==
=== Eastern Comets ===
- Tennis (Jorge Burmicky) (2004)
- Bethany Neeley - 800 Meters (2011)
- Girls' Basketball (2A) (2013)

=== Hamilton Heights Huskies ===
- Football (2012)
- Girls' Basketball (2013)

=== Lewis Cass ===
- Football (2008)
- Baseball (2008)

=== Northwestern Tigers ===
- Baseball (2005)
- Football (1992)
- Girls' Golf (1996)

=== Western Panthers ===
- Softball (1993)
- Softball (1994)
- Girls' Golf (2002)
- Kyle Walsh, 1600 meters (2004)
- Girls' Golf (2004)

== Neighboring conferences ==
- North Central Conference

== See also ==
- Hoosier Hysteria
