= Tri-County Conference (Northern Indiana) =

The Tri-County Conference was a league that ran from 1950 to 1965, and is considered a direct forerunner to the Mid-Indiana Conference. The league began in 1950 as the Howard-Miami Conference, as the three schools left from the post-consolidation Howard County Conference joined with three schools from Miami County. The conference changed its name to the TCC when Swayzee and Sweetser, from Grant County joined. When school consolidation forced the conference to look outside its footprint to find similar-sized schools, in 1965 it became the current MIC.

This should not be confused with conferences of the same name based in the southern and western portions of the state.

== Former members ==
School	Location	Mascot	Colors	# / County	Year joined	Previous conference	Year left	Conference joined
Bunker Hill	Bunker Hill	Minutemen		52; Miami	1950	Miami County	1963	none (consolidated into Maconaquah)
Clay Township	Loree	Indians		52; Miami	1950	Miami County	1963	none (consolidated into Maconaquah)
Converse	Converse	Bordermen		52; Miami	1950	Miami County	1957	none (consolidated into Oak Hill)
Eastern (Greentown)*	Greentown	Comets		34; Howard	1950	new school	1965	Mid-Indiana
Northwestern	Kokomo	Tigers		34; Howard	1950	Howard County	1965	Mid-Indiana
Western	Russiaville	Panthers		34; Howard	1950	Howard County	1958	Hoosier
Swayzee	Swayzee	Speed Kings		27; Grant	1955	Grant County	1957	none (consolidated into Oak Hill)
Sweetser	Sweetser	Braves		27; Grant	1955	Grant County	1965	none (consolidated into Oak Hill)
Oak Hill	Converse	Golden Eagles		27; Grant	1957	none (new school)	1965	Mid-Indiana
Maconaquah	Bunker Hill	Braves		52; Miami	1963	none (new school)	1965	Mid-Indiana

- Eastern also played in the Mississinewa Valley Conference from 1953 until 1965.
