= Three Rivers Conference (Indiana) =

- Conference: IHSAA
- Founded: 1971
- Sports fielded: 17; men's: 9; women's: 8
- No. of teams: 10
- Region: Northern Indiana

Locations
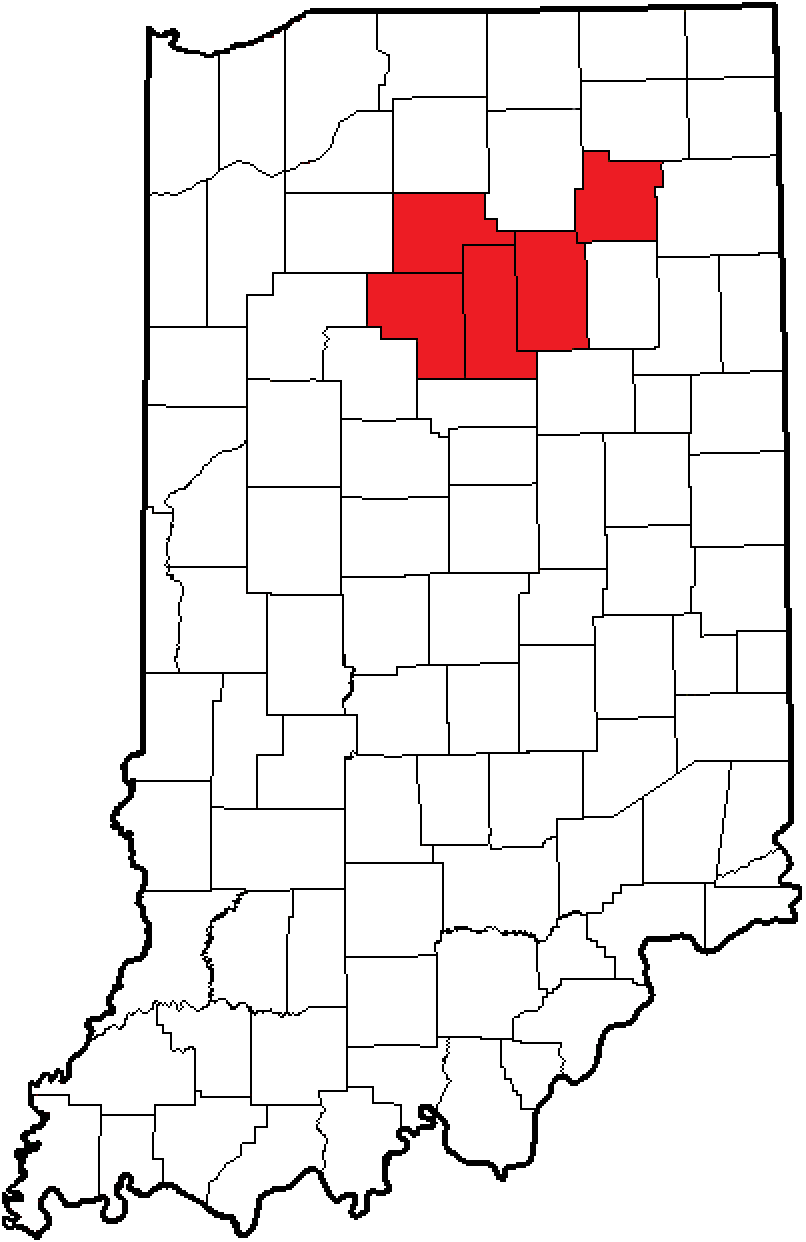

The Three Rivers Conference is a high school athletic conference in northeast Indiana, consisting of schools in Cass, Fulton, Howard, Miami, Wabash, and Whitley counties.

== History ==
The conference was formed in 1971 by independents Caston, Culver, Northfield, and Triton, and former Mid-Indiana Conference (MIC) member North Miami. The conference grew in 1976, as Manchester joined from the Northern Lakes Conference (NLC), Southwood joined from the Mid-Indiana Conference, and two recent consolidations, Whitko (1971) and Tippecanoe Valley (1974) joined. Culver left for the Northern State Conference (NSC) at the same time. This incarnation would last for two years, until Caston left for the Midwest Athletic Conference.

Triton left for the NSC in 1980, and was replaced by two MIC schools: Eastern (Greentown) and Oak Hill. Eastern rejoined the MIC in 1987, and was replaced by NLC school Rochester. The lineup changed once more in 2006, when Oak Hill traded places with Central Indiana Athletic Conference member Wabash. The latest change was in 2015, as Maconaquah and Peru joined from the folding MIC.

Rochester and Tippecanoe Valley share a traveling trophy that is called the bell.

In 2023, Tippecanoe Valley announced they would be exiting the conference to form their own 6 team conference featuring John Glenn, LaVille, Jimtown, Knox, and Bremen. Tippecanoe Valley was independent for the 2023–24 school year before joining the new conference.

Also in 2023, the Hoosier Conference announced that Lewis Cass would be leaving the conference at the end of the 2022–23 school year to join the TRC.

On June 1, 2023, North Miami announced they would be exiting the TRC to join the Hoosier North starting at the beginning of the 2024–25 school year. On the next day of June 2, Northwestern announced they would take North Miami's place in the TRC, exiting the Hoosier Conference.

== Membership ==
School	Location	Mascot	Colors	Enrollment 22–23	IHSAA Class	# / County	Year joined	Previous conference
Lewis Cass	Walton	Kings		413	AA	09; Cass	2023	Hoosier
Maconaquah	Bunker Hill	Braves		604	AAA	52; Miami	2015	Mid-Indiana
Manchester	North; Manchester	Squires		479	AA	85; Wabash	1976	Northern Lakes
Northfield	Speicherville	Norsemen		275	AA	85; Wabash	1971	Independents (new school 1962)
Northwestern	Kokomo	Tigers		554	AAA	85; Howard	2024	Hoosier
Peru	Peru	Bengal Tigers		655	AAA	52; Miami	2015	Mid-Indiana
Rochester; Community	Rochester	Zebras		495	AA	25; Fulton	1987	Northern Lakes
Southwood	Wabash	Knights		240	A	85; Wabash	1976	Mid-Indiana
Wabash	Wabash	Apaches		471	AA	85; Wabash	2006	Central Indiana
Whitko	South Whitley	Wildcats		417	AA	92; Whitley	1976	Independents (new school 1971)

== Former members ==
School	Location	Mascot	Colors	# / County	Year joined	Previous conference	Year left	Conference joined
Caston	Fulton	Comets		25; Fulton	1971	Independents (new school 1964)	1978	Midwest
Culver; Community	Culver	Cavaliers		50; Marshall	1971	Independents (MCC 1966)	1976	Independents (NSC 1977)
Triton	Bourbon	Trojans		50; Marshall	1971	Independents (MCC 1966)	1980	Northern State
Eastern (Greentown)	Greentown	Comets		34; Howard	1980	Mid-Indiana	1987	Mid-Indiana
Oak Hill	Converse	Golden Eagles		27; Grant	1980	Mid-Indiana	2006	Central Indiana
Tippecanoe Valley	Akron	Vikings		43; Kosciusko	1976	Independents (new school 1974)	2023	Independents
North; Miami	Denver	Warriors		52; Miami	1971	Mid-Indiana	2024	Hoosier North

== Football Divisions 2015–2018 ==
North	South
Manchester	Maconaquah
Northfield	North Miami
Rochester	Peru
Tippecanoe Valley	Southwood
Whitko	Wabash

== Sports ==
- Baseball (boys)
- Basketball
- Cross Country
- Football (boys)
- Golf
- Softball (girls)
- Swimming
- Tennis
- Track & Field
- Wrestling (boys)
- Volleyball (girls)

== State champions ==
Baseball

- Wabash (1986)~
- Northfield (2001-2A)
- Manchester (2002-2A)
- Northfield (2012-2A)

~ Wabash: Current Member of Three Rivers Conference, won title as member of Central Indiana Conference

Boys' Basketball

- Lewis Cass (2003-2A)~
- Northwestern (2007-2A)~
- Manchester (2025-2A)

~ Lewis Cass & Northwestern: won titles as members of Mid Indiana Conference

Football

- Wabash (1920)^
- Tippecanoe Valley (1979-1A)
- Oak Hill (1982-1A)~~
- Whitko (1986-2A)
- Rochester (1987-2A)
- North Miami (1993-1A)
- Southwood (2002-1A)

^ Wabash were winners of the "mythical" state football championship that was recorded pre-1928

~~ Oak Hill: Won title as Member of Three Rivers Conference, current member of Central Indiana Conference

Volleyball

- Southwood (2023-1A)

Golf

- Rochester (1980)

Tennis

- Peru (1971)^

^ Peru: won title as member of Central Indiana Conference

Track and Field

- Rochester (1918)

Wrestling

- Wabash (1927)
- Wabash (1928)

Softball

- Lewis Cass (2006-2A)^
- Lewis Cass (2008-2A)^
- North Miami (2014)
- Northfield (2021)

^ Lewis Cass: won titles as member of Mid Indiana Conference

== Conference champions ==
=== Football ===
Titles	School	Years
16	Tippecanoe Valley	1977, 1978, 1979, 1980*, 1981, 1982*, 1985*, 1987, 1993, 1994, 2004, 2006, 2011*, 2012*, 2021, 2022*
15	Rochester	1988, 1997, 1999, 2000*, 2001, 2005, 2007, 2008, 2009*, 2011*, 2012*, 2013*, 2014, 2022*, 2025
11	Southwood	1976, 1980*, 1992, 1995, 1996, 2002*, 2017, 2018, 2019, 2020, 2022*
6	Whitko	1986, 1989, 1990, 2002*, 2010, 2013*
5	Triton	1971, 1972, 1973, 1974, 1975*
4	North Miami	1982*, 1984*, 1985*, 1991, 1995
4	Oak Hill	1982*, 1983, 2000*, 2003
3	Northfield	1975*, 1980*, 2016
2	Maconaquah	2024, 2026
2	Manchester	1998, 2009*
2	Peru	2015, 2023
1	Caston	1975*
1	Eastern (Greentown)	1984*
0	Lewis Cass	
0	Northwestern	
0	Wabash	

- Culver did not have a football team until after they left the TRC.

=== Boys basketball ===
Titles	School	Years
16	Manchester	1979–80, 1981–82, 1982–83, 1986–87, 1991–92, 1992–93*, 1993–94, 1994–95*, 1995–96, 1997–98, 1998–99, 1999–2000, 2001–02*, 2015–16*, 2023–24*, 2024–25*
15	Tippecanoe Valley	1977–78, 1990–91*, 2000–01, 2001–02, 2002–03, 2003–04, 2004–05, 2005–06, 2006–07, 2007–08*, 2008–09, 2013–14, 2014–15, 2015–16*, 2022–23
12	Whitko	1978–79, 1980–81, 1983–84*, 1984–85, 1985–86*, 1987–88, 1990–91*, 1992–93*, 1994–95*, 1996–97*, 2009–10*, 2011–12
5	Northfield	1974–75*, 1988–89, 1989–90, 1990–91*, 1992–93*
4	Oak Hill	1983–84*, 1985–86*, 1996–97*, 2001–02*
4	Southwood	2010–11*, 2015–16*, 2016–17, 2017–18*
4	Wabash	2012–13, 2018–19, 2019–20, 2023–24*
3	Caston	1973–74*, 1975–76, 1976–77
3	Maconaquah	2017–18*, 2021–22*, 2024–25*
3	North Miami	1973–74*, 2009–10*, 2010–11*
3	Rochester	2007–08*, 2009–10*, 2020–21
1	Northwestern	2025–26
1	Peru	2021–22*
1	Triton	1972–73
0	Culver	
0	Eastern (Greentown)	
0	Lewis Cass	

=== Baseball ===
Titles	School	Years
5	Northfield	2011*, 2012, 2013, 2017, 2018*
2	Manchester	2015*, 2018*
2	Northwestern	2025, 2026
2	Peru	2015*, 2024
2	Rochester	2016, 2023
2	Tippecanoe Valley	2010, 2011*
1	North Miami	2014
1	Southwood	2021
1	Wabash	2022

=== Girls volleyball ===
Titles	School	Years
16	Southwood	2004*, 2005, 2006, 2007, 2008, 2009, 2010, 2011, 2012, 2013, 2021, 2022, 2023, 2024, 2025, 2026
4	Rochester	2003*, 2014, 2015, 2017
3	Tippecanoe Valley	2002, 2003*, 2004*
2	Maconaquah	2016, 2019
1	Northfield	2020
1	Wabash	2018
0	Lewis Cass	
0	Northwestern	

=== Girls basketball ===
Titles	School	Years
15	Tippecanoe Valley	1978–79, 1979–80*, 1991–92, 1992–93, 1994–95, 2002–03*, 2007–08*, 2009–10, 2012–13*, 2015–16, 2016–17, 2017–18, 2019–20*, 2021–22, 2022–23
9	Rochester	1999–2000, 2000–01, 2001–02, 2002–03*, 2003–04, 2004–05, 2006–07*, 2012–13*, 2019–20*
7	Northfield	1980–81, 1986–87, 1988–89, 1995–96, 2018–19, 2019–20*, 2020–21
6	Manchester	1984–85*, 1998–99, 2005–06, 2006–07*, 2007–08*, 2012–13*
5	Southwood	1979–80*, 1982–83, 1983–84, 1984–85*, 2013–14
5	Wabash	2010–11, 2011–12, 2012–13*, 2014–15, 2024–25*
3	Whitko	2008–09, 2024–25*, 2025–26
3	Oak Hill	1981–82, 1985–86, 2006–07*
2	North Miami	1996–97, 1997–98
1	Lewis Cass	2023–24
0	Caston	
0	Eastern (Greentown)	
0	Maconaquah	
0	Northwestern	
0	Peru	
0	Triton	

- The champions for 1986–87, 1988–89, 1989–90, and 1992–93 are not verified. Culver left the TRC before girls' competition began.

=== Boys Swimming & Diving ===
Titles	School	Years
10	Maconaquah	2016, 2017, 2018, 2019, 2020, 2021, 2022, 2023, 2024, 2025
2	Oak Hill	2003, 2004
0	Lewis Cass	
0	Manchester	
0	Northfield	
0	North Miami	
0	Rochester	
0	Tippecanoe Valley	
0	Wabash	

- There was no conference championship between the years 2007–2015 as there were not enough schools with a swim team to have a conference championship.
- Peru, North Miami, Southwood, and Whitko do not have a swim team.

=== Girls Swimming & Diving ===
Titles	School	Years
9	Maconaquah	2017, 2018, 2019, 2020, 2021, 2022, 2023, 2024, 2025
2	Oak Hill	2003, 2004
1	Rochester	2016
0	Lewis Cass	
0	Manchester	
0	Northfield	
0	North Miami	
0	Tippecanoe Valley	
0	Wabash	

- There was no conference championship between the years 2007–2015 as there were not enough schools with a swim team to have a conference championship.
- Peru, North Miami, Southwood, and Whitko do not have a swim team.

== Rivalries ==
Non Conference

- Lewis Cass vs Caston, Logansport and Pioneer

These schools share a Cass County rivalry in multiple sports.

- Maconaquah, Peru vs North Miami

The three schools battle for Miami County bragging rights. From 2015 to 2024, all three schools played in the TRC.

- Northfield vs North Miami

Two of the founding members of the TRC, Northfield and North Miami had the longest conference rivalry until North Miami left the TRC in 2024.

- Southwood vs Oak Hill

Around 14 miles apart and sharing Wabash/Miami/Grant County borders, Southwood and Oak Hill started out as Mid Indiana Conference rivals until Southwood left in 1976. The rivalry moved to the TRC when Oak Hill joined the conference in 1980. Though Oak Hill left the TRC in 2006, there is still bad blood to this day.

- Rochester vs Tippecanoe Valley

From 1987 to 2023, these two schools often fought for conference supremacy in multiple sports.

In football, the two schools battle for The Bell traveling trophy.

- Peru vs Logansport

Though rivals in all sports, the Peru vs Logansport football game is the oldest rivalry in Indiana high school sports.

They battle for the Baldini Trophy. The trophy is named for Don Baldini, a Peru native who became Logansport's winningest football coach.

- Whitko vs Columbia City and Churubusco

These schools are Whitley County rivals in multiple sports.

- Whitko vs Tippecanoe Valley

Both schools share territory in Kosciusko County and were TRC rivals from 1976 to 2023.

- Northwestern vs Western

Western Howard County schools that are only 8 miles from each other and a rivalry that used to be played when both schools were in the Mid Indiana Conference and Hoosier Athletic Conference.

Conference

- Lewis Cass vs Northwestern

An old rivalry that followed from their two previous conferences, the Mid Indiana and Hoosier Athletic Conferences.

- Maconaquah vs Peru

Miami County rivals and previously Mid Indiana Conference foes until they moved to the TRC in 2015.

- Maconaquah vs Southwood

Maconaquah and Southwood were old MIC rivals in the 1960s until Southwood moved to the TRC in 1976. The rivalry was renewed when Maconaquah joined the TRC in 2015.

- Manchester vs Wabash

Starting in 1957, this is the oldest existing rivalry between Wabash County schools.

- Manchester vs Whitko

Only 12 miles apart, the two share Whitley/Wabash county borders.

- Northfield vs Southwood

When Wabash County schools consolidated in 1962, the smaller schools merged into two identical 'sibling' schools. This connection has made Northfield vs Southwood a natural and long-standing county rivalry.

- Rochester vs Manchester

Both schools were charter members of the Northern Lake Conference in 1963. Manchester left the NLC in 1976. When Rochester moved to the TRC in 1987, the old NLC rivalry was renewed.

- Wabash vs Northfield

Located in the same geographical proximity these schools often create a going rivalry

== Resources ==
- Three Rivers Conference
- IHSAA Conferences
- IHSAA Directory
- The Senior Reports - Indiana
