= Hoosier Heartland Conference =

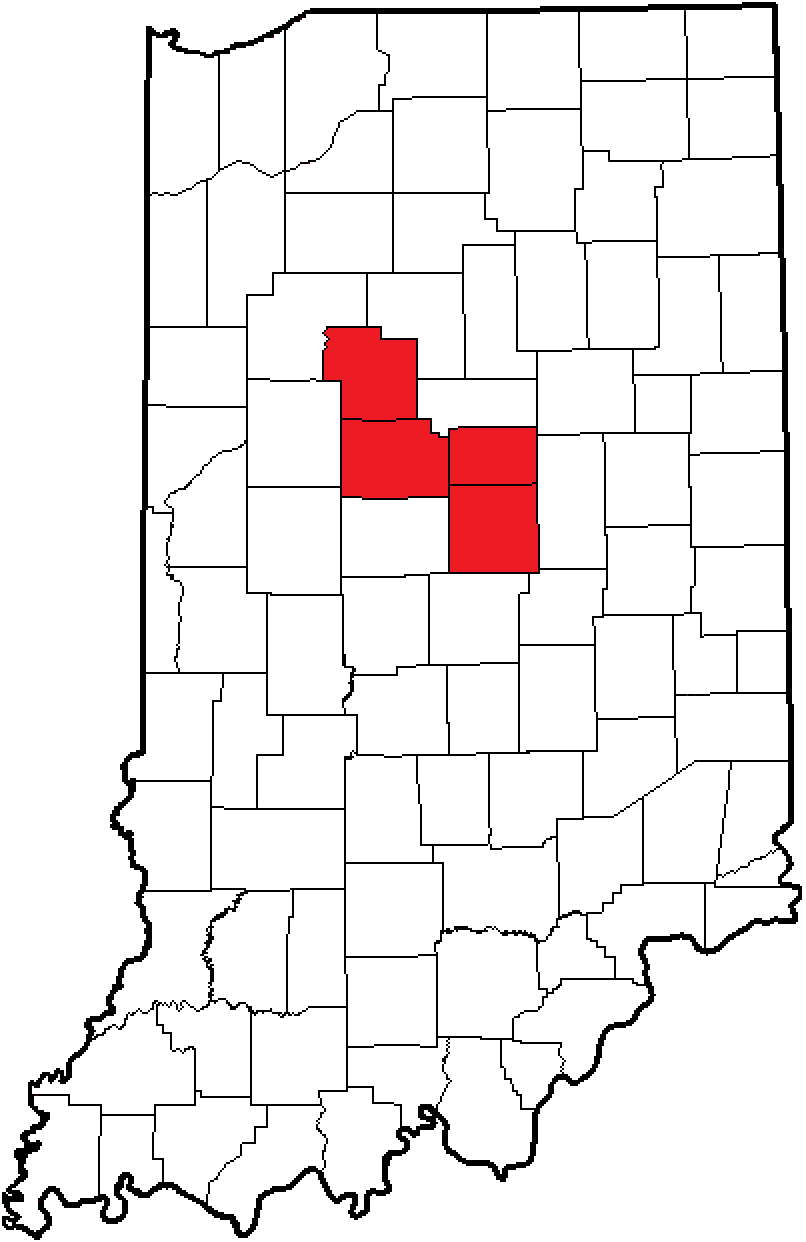
The Hoosier Heartland Conference in Indiana

The Hoosier Heartland Conference is an IHSAA-Sanctioned Athletic Conference in North Central Indiana. It comprises mainly single A and smaller AA schools. Lafayette Central Catholic joined the Hoosier Athletic Conference after the 2010–11 school year, and was replaced by Sheridan, who joined 2012. With the major conference realignment in Indiana in 2015, the conference picked up four schools from neighboring conferences that were folding, as well as a football-only member to balance the new football divisions. However, with the Midwest Conference reforming, the conference will be down to eight schools (seven in football) for the 2018–19 school year, as Delphi will rejoin the conference in 2019.

== Membership ==
School	Location	Mascot	Colors	# / County	Enrollment 24-24	IHSAA Class	IHSAA Class Football	Year joined	Previous conference
Carroll	Flora	Cougars		08; Carroll	321	1A	1A	1992	Midwest
Clinton; Central	Michigantown	Bulldogs		12; Clinton	268	1A	1A	1989	Rangeline
Clinton; Prairie	Frankfort	Gophers		12; Clinton	327	1A	1A	1989	Rangeline
Delphi; Community	Delphi	Oracles		08; Carroll	417	2A	2A	1992; 2019	Hoosier; Independents (HAC 2016)^{1}
Eastern (Greentown)	Greentown	Comets		34; Howard	499	2A	2A	2015	Mid-Indiana
Rossville	Rossville	Hornets		12; Clinton	264	1A	N/A	1989	Midwest
Sheridan	Sheridan	Blackhawks		Hamilton/Boone	336	2A	1A	2012	Hoosier
Taylor	Center	Titans		34; Howard	366	2A	1A	2015	Mid-Indiana
Tri-Central	Sharpsville	Trojans		80; Tipton	232	1A	1A	1989	Rangeline

1. Delphi played in the HAC from 1998 to December 17, 2015, when it was removed from the conference, and played as an Independent until rejoining the HHC. Since the departure happened in the middle of the school year instead of during the summer, the exit date is listed as 2016, since the school completed the fall season sports as conference members.

=== Former members ===
School	Location	Mascot	Colors	# / County	Year joined	Previous conference	Year left	Current Conference
Central; Catholic	Lafayette	Knights		79; Tippecanoe	1993	Hoosier	2011	Hoosier
Frontier	Chalmers	Falcons		91; White	2015	Midwest	2018	Midwest
Tri-County	Wolcott	Cavaliers		91; White	2015	Midwest	2018	Midwest

=== Former Football-Only Member ===
School	Location	Mascot	Colors	# / County	Year joined	Previous conference	Year left	Current Conference
North; White	Monon	Vikings		91; White	2015	Midwest	2018	Midwest

== Divisions 2015-18 ==
East	West
Clinton Central	Carroll
Eastern	Clinton Prairie
Sheridan	Frontier
Taylor	North White (FB only)
Tri-Central	Rossville (non-FB)
	Tri-County

== State champions ==
IHSAA State Champions

=== Carroll Cougars (1) ===
- 1995 Football (A)

=== Clinton Prairie Gophers (6) ===
- 1984 Volleyball
- 1997 Volleyball (A)
- 1998 Volleyball (A)
- 1999 Girls' Basketball (A)
- 2002 Softball (A)
- 2005 Softball (A)

=== Rossville Hornets (3) ===
- 2000 Baseball (A)
- 2002 Boys' Basketball (A)
- 2024 Girls’ Softball (A)

=== Tri-Central Trojans (4) ===
- 2003 Girls' Basketball (A)
- 2004 Girls' Basketball (A)
- 2005 Girls' Basketball (A)
- 2013 Football (A)

=== Taylor Titans (1) ===
- 2000 Boys Baseball (2A)
