= North Miami Community Schools =

School district in Miami County, Indiana, US

Location
- 394 E 900 N Denver, Indiana

District information
- Grades: P–12
- Superintendent: Kenneth Hanson
- Accreditation: North Central Association

Students and staff
- Athletic conference: Three Rivers Conference; Running Rivers Conference
- District mascot: Warriors
- Colors: Red and Black

Other information
- Graduation Rate: 100%
- 2024 Graduates: 68
- Website: www.nmcs.k12.in.us

North Miami Community Schools is one of three school systems in Miami County, Indiana. Located in the northern part of Miami County, North Miami Community Schools is located just north of Denver, Indiana.

== Schools ==
- North Miami Elementary School
- North Miami Middle/High School
