= Wabash High School =

Location
- 580 North Miami Street; Wabash, Wabash County, Indiana 46992; United States; 40°48′28″N 85°49′35″W

Information
- Type: Public secondary
- School district: Wabash City Schools
- Superintendent: Amy Sivley
- Principal: Joshua Blossom
- Teaching staff: 31.00 (FTE)
- Grades: 9-12
- Enrollment: 492 (2023-2024)
- Student to teacher ratio: 15.87
- Colors: Orange and Black
- Athletics conference: Three Rivers Conference
- Nickname: Apaches
- Rivals: Northfield, Southwood
- Website: whs.apaches.k12.in.us

Wabash High School is a public high school in Wabash, Indiana, United States approximately 500 students in grades 9–12.

The nickname of the students and the athletic teams is "Wabash Apaches."

== Demographics ==
The demographic breakdown of the 418 students enrolled in 2014-2015 was:

- Male - 52.2%
- Female - 47.8%
- Native American/Alaskan - 1.0%
- Asian/Pacific islanders - 0.5%
- Black - 1.0%
- Hispanic - 1.9%
- White - 94.9%
- Multiracial - 0.7%

51.7% of the students were eligible for free or reduced price lunch, making this a Title I school.

== Athletics ==
The Wabash Apaches compete in the Three Rivers Conference. School colors are orange and black. The following IHSAA sanctioned sports are offered:

- Baseball (boys)
  - State championship - 1986
- Basketball (girls & boys)
- Cross country (girls & boys)
- Football (boys)
- Golf (boys & girls)
- Soccer (boys & girls)
- Softball (girls)
- Swimming (boys & girls)
- Tennis (girls & boys)
- Track (boys & girls)
- Volleyball (girls)
- Wrestling (boys & girls)

== Notable alumni ==
- Adelaide Steele Baylor (1860–1935), federal education official
- Margie Stewart (1919–2012), official United States Army poster girl during World War II
- Gene Stratton-Porter (1863–1924), writer

== Notable faculty ==
- Mary E. Byrd (1849–1934), astronomer

== See also ==
- List of high schools in Indiana
