= Kitt O'Brien =

American football player (born 1990)

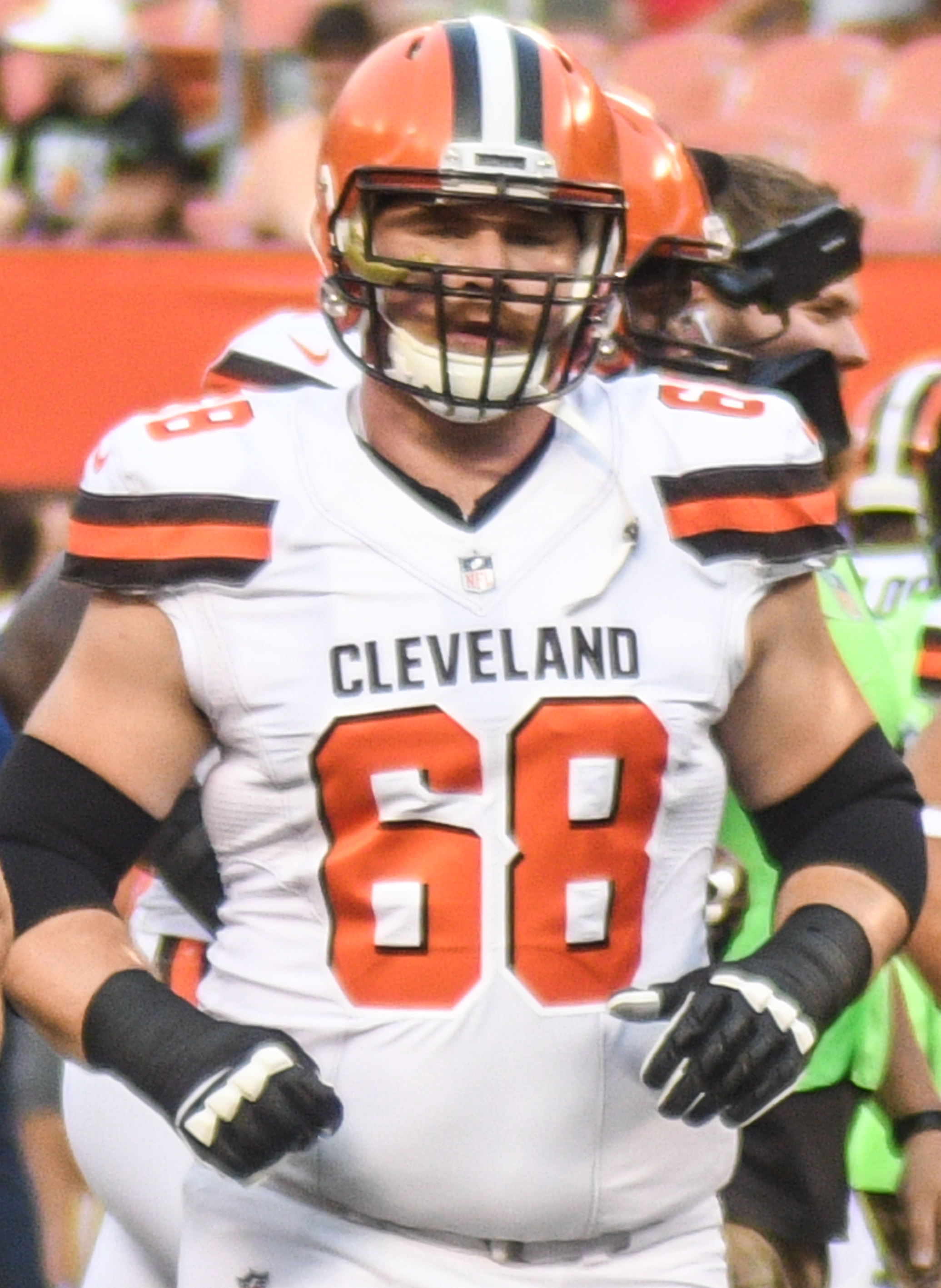
- O'Brien with the Cleveland Browns in 2017

No. 79, 63, 64, 65, 68, 77
- Position: Offensive guard

Personal information
- Born: April 29, 1990 (age 36); Walton, Indiana, U.S.
- Listed height: 6 ft 5 in (1.96 m)
- Listed weight: 311 lb (141 kg)

Career information
- High school: Walton (IN) Lewis Cass
- College: Ball State
- NFL draft: 2013: undrafted

Career history
- Cleveland Gladiators (2013–2014); Indianapolis Colts (2015–2016)*; Cleveland Browns (2017)*; Birmingham Iron (2019); Carolina Panthers (2019)
- * Offseason or practice squad member only
- Stats at Pro Football Reference

Kitt O'Brien (born April 29, 1990) is an American former professional football offensive guard. He played college football for the Ball State Cardinals and signed with the Cleveland Gladiators of the Arena Football League (AFL) as an undrafted free agent in 2013.

== College career ==
O'Brien played college football for the Ball State Cardinals, appearing in 40 games and starting 36. He was an integral piece of the offensive line in 2011, as the Ball State offensive line allowed only 11 sacks all season, 12th lowest in the NCAA.

== Professional career ==
=== Cleveland Gladiators ===
O'Brien was not drafted in 2013. He was invited to attend training camp with the New York Giants, but did not sign. He then signed with the Cleveland Gladiators of the Arena Football League (AFL). O'Brien played in 5 games with the Gladiators in 2013, 18 games in 2014 and 16 games in 2015.

=== Indianapolis Colts ===
On August 7, 2015, O'Brien signed with the Indianapolis Colts of the National Football League (NFL), after Ben Heenan was waived. O'Brien was waived by the Colts the following day, and re-signed with the Colts on August 10. He was released on September 5, at the end of the preseason. On October 31, O'Brien signed to the Colts practice squad. He was released on November 10. O'Brien was again signed to the practice squad on December 29.

On September 3, 2016, he was waived by the Colts as part of final roster cuts. He was signed to the Colts' practice squad on December 15, 2016.

=== Cleveland Browns ===
O'Brien signed with the Cleveland Browns on July 30, 2017. He was waived on September 1, 2017, during roster cutdowns.

=== Birmingham Iron ===
In November 2018, O'Brien signed with the Birmingham Iron of the Alliance of American Football.

=== Carolina Panthers ===
On April 5, 2019, O'Brien signed with the Carolina Panthers of the NFL. He was placed on injured reserve on August 30, 2019.
