= Vic Overman =

American football player and coach (1922–2011)

Biographical details
- Born: October 25, 1922; Westfield, Indiana, U.S.
- Died: August 22, 2011 (aged 88); Brownsburg, Indiana, U.S.

Playing career

Football
- 1942–1945: Ball State
- 1947: Sheridan Independent Team
- Position: Quarterback

Coaching career (HC unless noted)
- 1946–1951: Westfield HS (IN)
- 1952: RochesterHS (IN)
- 1953–1954: Franklin (IN)
- 1955–1967: Michigan City HS (IN)
- 1972–1980: Brownsburg HS (IN)

Head coaching record
- Overall: 166–108–6 (high school); 4–11–1 (college)

Victor H. Overman (October 26, 1922 – August 22, 2011) was an American high school and college football coach. He served as the head football coach at Franklin College in Franklin, Indiana from 1953 to 1954.

Overman was a quarterback at Ball State University from 1942 to 1945.

== Head coaching record ==
=== College ===
Year	Team	Overall	Conference	Standing	Bowl/playoffs
Franklin Grizzlies (Hoosier Conference) (1953–1954)
1953	Franklin	1–7	1–5	6th	
1954	Franklin	3–4–1	2–4	T–4th	
Franklin:		4–11–1	3–9		
Total:		4–11–1			
