= Gary Rardon =

American serial killer (1943–2024)

Gary Duane Rardon
- Rardon in 1962
- Born: September 4, 1943; Wayne County, North Carolina, U.S.
- Died: March 16, 2024 (aged 80); Indianapolis, Indiana, U.S.
- Status: Deceased
- Convictions: Federal; Interstate transportation of a stolen vehicle (18 U.S.C. § 2312); Possessing an unregistered firearm (26 U.S.C. § 5861); Illinois; Murder (3 counts); Indiana; Voluntary manslaughter Connecticut; Robbery with violence
- Penalty: Federal; 12 years imprisonment Illinois; 40 to 100 years imprisonment Indiana; 2 to 20 years imprisonment Connecticut; 3 to 5 years imprisonment

Details
- Victims: 4
- Span of crimes: 1962–1974
- Country: United States
- States: Indiana and Illinois
- Weapons: Pistol; Sawed-off shotgun
- Date apprehended: January 16, 1975

Gary Duane Rardon (September 4, 1943 – March 16, 2024) was a convicted American serial killer and spree killer who killed a man in Indiana in 1962, then robbed and killed three working men in Chicago, Illinois over a four-day period in 1974.

== Early life ==
Rardon's father was William Harley Rardon, a U.S. Air Force master sergeant. Rardon said his parents treated him well. Asked about the murders, Rardon said, "I had a perfect family. Too perfect. My father didn't drink, didn't run around, didn't neglect us. Smoking was his only vice. My mother didn't do anything wrong. But sometimes I felt I didn't live up to their expectations." Rardon attended Maconaquah High School in Bunker Hill, Indiana.

== First murder ==
On July 7, 1962, James Homer Smith, 23, who had just left the Marines, went into a train station in Indianapolis. When he asked if anyone needed a ride east, Rardon, then 19 and an AWOL sailor, said yes. Later that day, he shot Smith twice in the head and stuffed his body in the man's car. Smith's body was found 12 days later in Washington, Pennsylvania. On December 5, 1962, Rardon was arrested and charged with first degree murder. He claimed self-defense, saying Smith had made sexual advances towards him. On April 19, 1963, Rardon pleaded guilty to voluntary manslaughter and was sentenced to 2 to 21 years in prison. On January 8, 1966, his father, who had visited him regularly in prison, died of a heart attack. Rardon's grandfather, who briefly took care of him as a child, visited him in prison. "He told me that my father died of a broken heart," Rardon later said. "I never forgot that. When I was young, I wanted to be an FBI man."

In 1965, a psychiatrist who examined Rardon said he was "near psychotic" and "very dangerous." However, just two years later, the same psychiatrist re-examined him and said there was a "minimal" chance he would ever be violent again. Rardon later admitted that after his first psychiatric examination, he went to work for the psychiatrist as a medical records keeper. He was released on parole on May 8, 1967. In 1969, Rardon was sentenced to 3 to 5 years in prison for robbery in Connecticut.

== 1974 crime spree ==
After his release, Rardon, who had divorced his first wife, remarried. He was able to get a job as a machinist earning almost $250 a week. However, Rardon became bored and eventually quit his job. He then left his wife. As his bills started to pile up, Rardon stumbled across a shotgun which belonged to his father-in-law, and sawed off the barrel.

From November 14 to November 18, 1974, Rardon robbed and murdered three men in Chicago with the sawed-off shotgun. The first victim was 28-year-old Gene R. Ravenscraft, who was killed on November 14. A native of Wheeling, Illinois, Ravenscraft had been working overtime since his wife, Cynthia, was pregnant with their third child. On the night of his murder, Gene was the only man in his office working the night shift, as he had only been there a few months. Around 7 P.M., Rardon, carrying his shotgun, saw Ravenscraft alone in the office. He walked inside and shot him once in the left side of the neck, killing him. Rardon then took $23 and Ravenscraft's coat.

On November 16, Rardon killed 31-year-old cab driver Herbert Noakes of Hammond, Indiana. He was killed a week before he had planned to marry his fiancée, Catherine E. Mensing. Earlier that night, Noakes had bought a hamburger for his wife. He told her it was a slow night, but said he would stay in the city in the hope of more riders. He was eventually spotted by Rardon, who was driving a stolen Corvette. Rardon parked, hid his shotgun under his coat, and got inside the cab. He then told Noakes to hand over his money. When Noakes turned around, Rardon shot him once in the left side of the neck, killing him. He left the cab with $63.

On November 18, Rardon killed fifty-year-old Asher Gruenberg of Skokie, Illinois. Gruenberg had worked for a steel company before joining a construction business. A World War II veteran, Gruenberg had left high school to serve in the Philippines and New Guinea. He and his wife, Rena, lived with their son, Myron, and daughter, Linda. The family were faithful Jews. Myron was supposed to have his bar mitzvah on November 30, 1974.

As he was driving, Rardon saw Gruenberg leaving a sales office to go to his car. He parked and watched him return inside. Gruenberg was sitting at his desk when Rardon entered and shot him once in the left side of the neck. He then took his wallet, which had his credit cards and approximately $75. Two miles away, Rardon used the credit card to buy gas for the stolen Corvette, signing the receipt "Asher Gruenberg." The station attendant wrote down the license number of the car on the receipt. Rardon headed south through Indiana and Kentucky, using Gruenberg's credit cards multiple times. All of the receipts went to Rena, who turned them over to the FBI. FBI agents tracked Rardon to a Sears store in Louisville, Kentucky, and he was arrested on January 16, 1975. The federal agents found him wearing Gene Ravenscraft's coat and carrying Asher Gruenberg's ID and credit cards. Rardon quickly confessed to all three of the murders.

Rardon was charged in Illinois with three counts of murder and three counts of armed robbery. He also faced federal charges for transporting a stolen vehicle in interstate commerce and possessing an unregistered firearm. In 1976, Rardon pleaded guilty to the federal charges and was sentenced to 12 years in prison. On February 17, 1977, he pleaded guilty to all of the state charges. Illinois had reinstated capital punishment in July 1974, but the statute had been struck down in July 1975, and capital punishment was not reinstated again until July 1977.

As such, Rardon was instead sentenced to three concurrent 40 to 100 years terms in prison, to run consecutively to his federal sentence. Judge James Michael Bailey said "I haven't seen anything as bad before in all my years on the bench." The prosecution said "the value of three lives was $161 and a few credit cards." After Rardon was sentenced, Assistant State's Attorney Mike Ficaro told him "You should be electrocuted." In response, he replied, "I suppose you're right. I deserve to die." Rardon's attorney advised him to remain silent during the hearing. However, Rardon turned around and apologized to the families of his victims. One of them bitterly muttered, "He's sorry."

During an interview a few days later, Rardon said "I was embarrassed. I didn't want to face them. I was ashamed. I try to erase it. I've had over two years to cope with it. I don't want to remember. I was sorry and I understand how they feel. It doesn't do any good, you know, but I do feel a lot of remorse. Still, it's not going to bring those people back to life. I think about it continuously, though. I get down. I can't do anything. I felt like, I owe you my life because that's the only important thing I have. I can't explain it."

Rardon also said he had anger management problems. He'd gotten drunk several days before the murders. Prison psychiatrists said he had an IQ of 117. Rardon served most of his sentence at Danville Correctional Center and Graham Correctional Center. While in prison, he learned computer skills and received a certificate in cooking. He also took two years of college business courses. Rardon became eligible for parole in 1987, but was unanimously denied release at all of his hearings. His projected discharge date was set for September 30, 2016.

At a parole hearing in 2012, Rardon said "he was having hard times and just lost it," describing the robbery-slayings as "pretty cold blooded." He said his release plan was to live in the Champaign-Urbana area and live alone. He said he would need to rely on his 90-year-old mother, aunts, and uncles to get a job, and did not talk further about his parole plans. Rardon, who had not received a major violation in prison since 1986, said he turned his life around in 1985, after he became determined to become a better person. He expressed remorse for his actions, saying he regretted the pain he had caused to the victims, their families, and his own family. Rardon said he now had feelings for people, and believed this was somewhat of an indicator that he had changed. He said he did not have these feelings in the past.

While commending Rardon for his good behavior and remorse, the Illinois Prisoner Review Board concluded:

"There is no argument that Inmate Rardon's behavior over the past several years has been good, and he is to be commended for that. Yet the crimes committed by him, using his own words, were 'pretty cold blooded.' These senseless crimes were committed after Inmate Rardon had already served a sentence in Indiana for another life he had taken. Inmate Rardon had already successfully robbed each victim and the victims made no attempt to prevent Inmate Rardon from leaving the scene. However, Inmate Rardon chose to willingly execute each of the victims with a shotgun blast to their body. These are crimes for which remorse is simply not enough."

Rardon completed his state sentence on September 30, 2016, after which he was transferred to federal custody to serve his 12-year sentence. He was released from federal prison on December 17, 2020. Overall, Rardon served nearly 50 years in prison for the murders. He died in Indianapolis on March 16, 2024, aged 80.

== See also ==
- List of serial killers in the United States
