= Peru Junior/Senior High School =

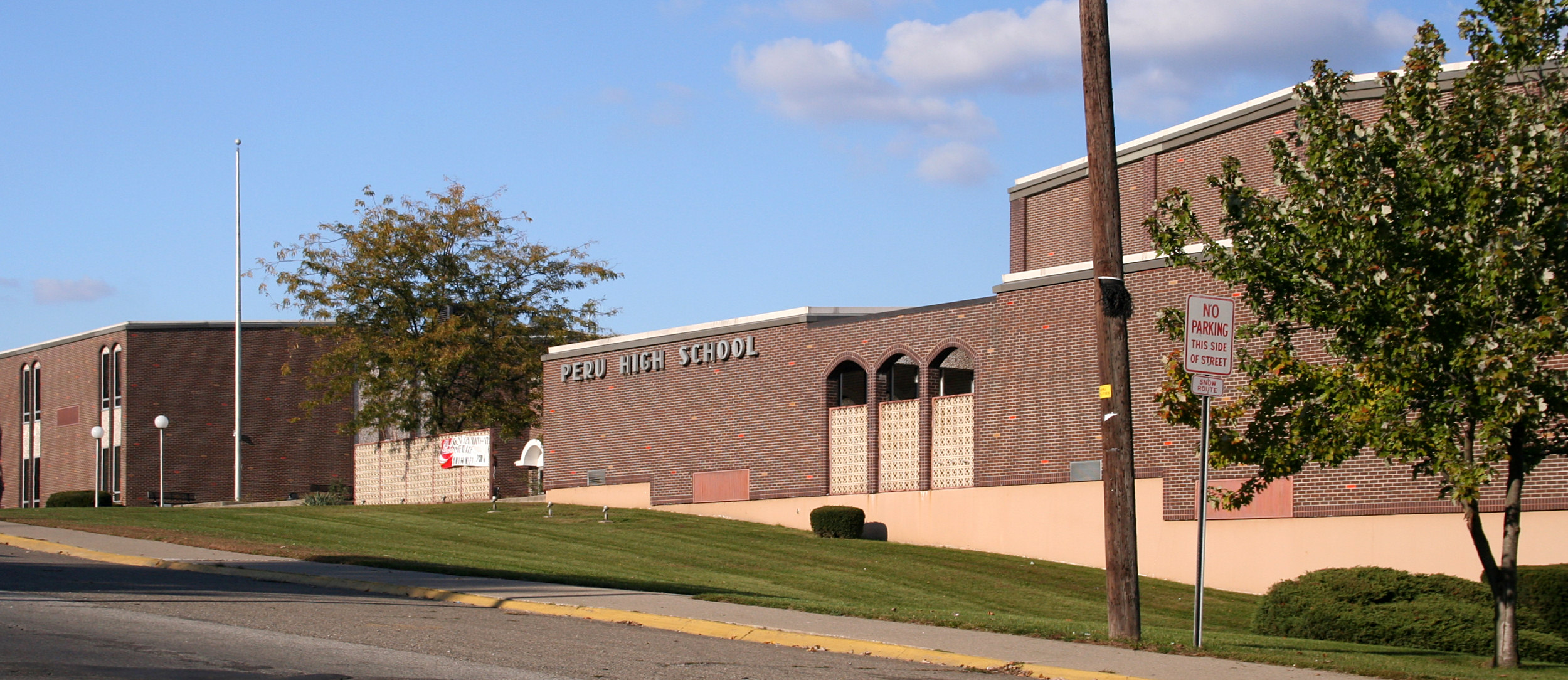

Location
- 401 North Broadway; Peru, Miami County, Indiana 46970; United States; 40°45′38″N 86°04′22″W

Information
- Type: Public secondary school
- School district: Peru Community Schools
- Principal: Julie Scheurich
- Teaching staff: 52.00 (FTE)
- Grades: 7–12
- Enrollment: 852 (2023–2024)
- Student to teacher ratio: 16.38
- Color
- Athletics: Indiana High School Athletic Association
- Athletics conference: Three Rivers
- Team name: Tigers
- Website: jshs.peru.k12.in.us

Peru Junior/Senior High School is a secondary school located in Peru, Indiana, United States, serving students in grades 7–12 for Peru Community Schools since 1972. The former high school building, built in 1939 and now serving as headquarters of the Miami Nation of Indiana, is included in the Peru High School Historic District listed on the National Register of Historic Places since 2013. In 2023, Peru High School and Peru Junior High School merged and became Peru Junior/Senior High School, or "PJSHS."

== Athletics ==
PJSHS' school colors are old gold and black, and their athletic nickname is the Bengal Tigers.

Peru High School won a state championship in boys' tennis in 1970–71.

The Peru High School wrestling program has won six conferences, 14 sectionals, and six regionals in just the last 20 years. Wrestling is a single-class sport in Indiana.

The Peru High School boys' basketball team has won 40 sectional titles and three regional titles dating back to 1927.

PJSHS' main rivals are the other two schools in Miami County: Maconaquah and North Miami.

PJSHS offers the following sports:

- Baseball
- Basketball
- Cross Country
- Football
- Golf
- Gymnastics
- Soccer
- Softball
- Tennis
- Track and Field
- Volleyball
- Wrestling

== School media ==
The Peruvian is the school's bi-weekly paper with current news, editorials, special features, photos, and a complete sports section.

The Narcissus is the student yearbook that is published annually.

== Notable alumni ==
- G. David Thompson (1899–1965), investment banker, industrialist, and modern art collector.
- Kyle Macy was the 22nd overall pick in the 1979 NBA Draft. He was selected by the Phoenix Suns. Macy went on to play one season each for the Chicago Bulls (1985-86) and the Indiana Pacers (1986-87) before retiring from the NBA.
- John Francis O'Hara, Cardinal, Archbishop of Philadelphia, and President of the University of Notre Dame.
- Frank Erhart Emmanuel Germann (1887–1974), physicist, physical chemist, and university professor. He was a founding member of the modern chemistry department of the University of Colorado.
- Albert Fredrick Ottomar Germann (1886–1976), physical chemist, university professor, and chemical entrepreneur. He was a founder (1935) and President of Nutritional Research Associates, Inc., in South Whitley, Indiana.
- B.J. Penn, served as Assistant Secretary of the Navy (Installations and Environment) from 2005 to 2009.

== See also ==
- List of high schools in Indiana
