= Brandon Dillon =

Brandon Dillon may refer to:

- Brandon Dillon (politician)
- Brandon Dillon (American football)
