= Michael Otto =

Michael Otto may refer to:

- Michael Otto (businessman) (born 1943), head of German Otto Group, the world's largest mail order company
- Mike Otto (American football) (born 1983), American football offensive tackle
