= Northwestern School Corporation =

School district in Indiana

Northwestern School Corporation is a public school corporation in Howard County, Indiana. The population of the high school has never exceeded 800 students. The school colors are purple, gold and white. The school mascot is Tyler the Tiger.

== Administration ==
- Kristen Bilkey, Superintendent

== Building directory ==
- Northwestern Elementary School
- Howard Elementary School
- Northwestern Middle School
- Northwestern High School

== Achievements ==
- In 2018, the girls basketball team became State Champions after winning the class 3A game against Greensburg 63–42. The team's record that year was 29–1.
- In 2007, The boys basketball team became State Champions after winning the class 2A game against Winchester in 2OT, 78–74. Several Indiana State Championship records were broken in this lengthy thriller.
- Northwestern was recognized by the Department of Education with a Blue Ribbon Award two years in a row. Currently the school does not hold that honor.

== Notable alumni ==
- Sylvia, female country singer-songwriter who graduated from Northwestern High School in 1974
- Brandon Beachy is a former Northwestern baseball player who graduated in 2004. He formerly pitched for the Atlanta Braves MLB team. In the 2012 season Brandon held a 1.12 ERA, the lowest in all of the MLB, going into July when he went on the disabled list in order to get Tommy John Surgery. Brandon recovered from the surgery and was put back into the Braves rotation in July 2013.
