= Oakford, Indiana =

- Unincorporated community
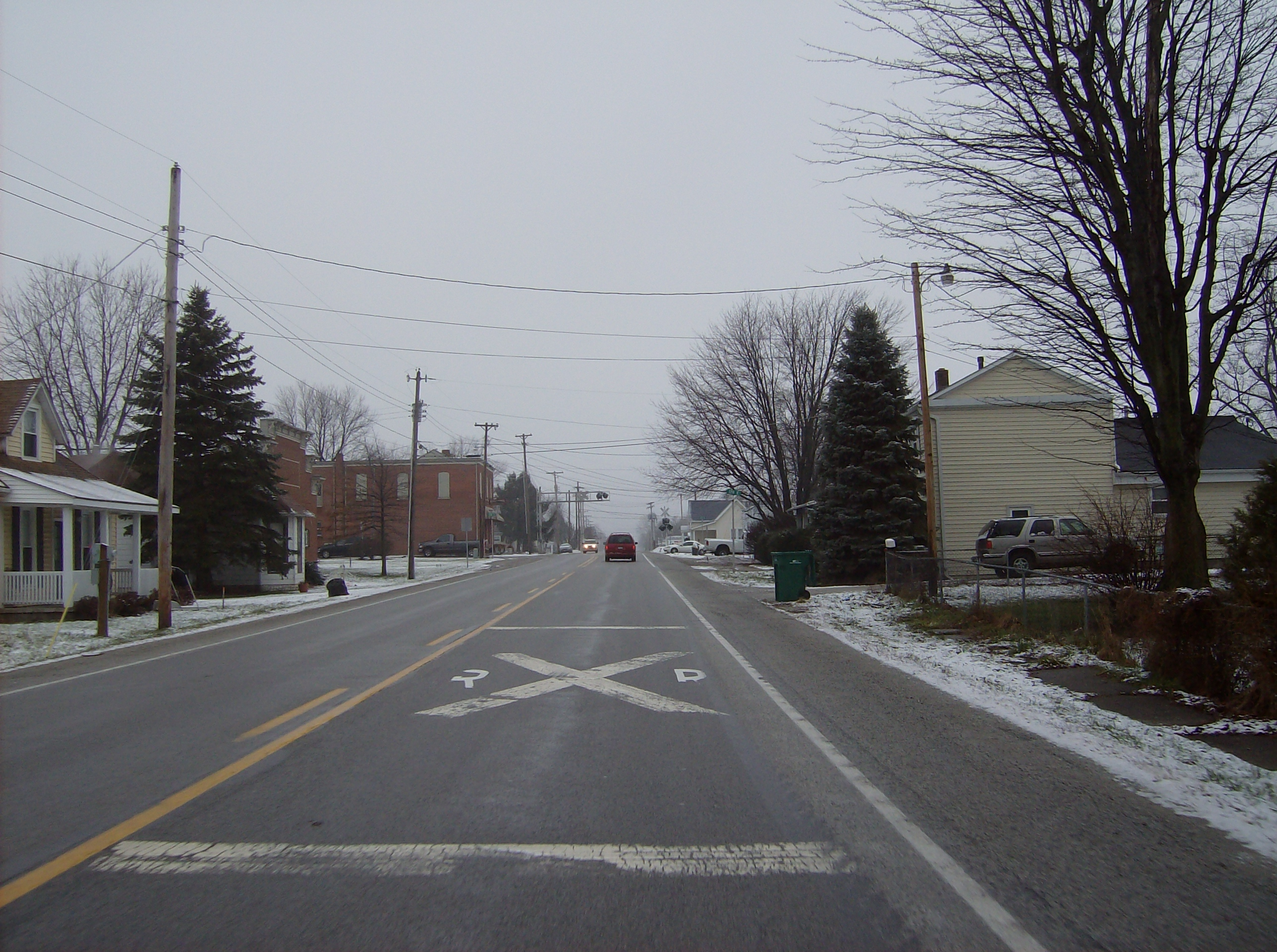
- Approaching the railroad crossing in Oakford

- Location within Indiana Location within the United States
- Coordinates: 40°25′09″N 86°06′15″W
- Country: United States
- State: Indiana
- County: Howard
- Township: Taylor
- Elevation: 860 ft (260 m)
- Time zone: Eastern Time Zone
- ZIP code: 46902
- FIPS code: 18-55584
- GNIS feature ID: 440462

Oakford (originally called Fairfield) is an unincorporated community in southwestern Taylor Township, Howard County, Indiana, United States.

Oakford is part of the Kokomo, Indiana Metropolitan Statistical Area.

== History ==
Oakford was laid out in 1852. It was originally called Fairfield, and the name Oakford was adopted in 1854.

== Geography ==
Oakford lies at a railroad crossing of State Road 26, and little more than 1 mile (about 2 km) east of State Road 26's intersection with U.S. Route 31 until November 2013. Now US 31 has been moved over, and Oakford is right at the State Road 26 exit (on the west side) on the new interstate grade Highway US 31.
