= Mike Otto (American football) =

American football player (born 1983)

No. 66
- Position: Offensive tackle

Personal information
- Born: July 24, 1983 (age 43); Kokomo, Indiana, U.S.
- Listed height: 6 ft 5 in (1.96 m)
- Listed weight: 310 lb (141 kg)

Career information
- High school: Maconaquah (Bunker Hill, Indiana)
- College: Purdue
- NFL draft: 2007: 7th round, 223rd overall pick

Career history
- Tennessee Titans (2007–2013)

Awards and highlights
- Second-team All-Big Ten (2006)

Career NFL statistics
- Games played: 62
- Games started: 5
- Stats at Pro Football Reference

Michael Everett Otto (born July 24, 1983) is an American former professional football player who was an offensive tackle for the Tennessee Titans of the National Football League (NFL). He played college football for the Purdue Boilermakers and was selected by the Titans in the seventh round of the 2007 NFL draft.

== Early life ==
Otto attended Maconaquah High School, located in Bunker Hill, Indiana where he played basketball, track, and football.

College recruiting
Name	Hometown	School	Height	Weight	40^{‡}	Commit date
Mike Otto; OL	Bunker Hill, Indiana	Maconaquah High School	6 ft 7 in (2.01 m)	245 lb (111 kg)	4.9	Jul 8, 2003
Mike Otto; OL	Recruit ratings: Scout: Rivals:					
Overall recruit ranking: Scout: 136 (OL) Rivals: -- (OL), -- (IN)
‡ Refers to 40-yard dash; Note: In many cases, Scout, Rivals, 247Sports, On3, and ESPN may conflict in their listings of height, weight and 40 time.; In these cases, the average was taken. ESPN grades are on a 100-point scale.; Sources: "2002 Team Ranking". Rivals.com.

Otto committed to Purdue University on July 8, 2003. Otto had no other FBS scholarship offers for football.

== Professional career ==
Otto was selected by the Tennessee Titans in the seventh round of the 2007 NFL draft. He spent the 2007 season on the team's practice squad, and was promoted to the active roster for a playoff game against San Diego on January 6. He played in only one game in 2008, the season-finale against the Indianapolis Colts on December 28. He played in 14 games for the Titans in 2009, mainly on special teams, and was re-signed on February 17, 2010.
