= Carroll Junior-Senior High School =

Carroll Jr./Sr. High School

Location
- 2362 East Indiana 18; Flora, Indiana 47909; United States; 40°32′49″N 86°28′55″W

Information
- Type: Public
- Established: 1961
- School district: Carroll Consolidated School Corporation
- Principal: Shay Bonnell
- Teaching staff: 24.67 (on an FTE basis)
- Grades: 7–12
- Enrollment: 321 (2023–2024)
- Student to teacher ratio: 13.01
- Color
- Athletics conference: Hoosier Heartland Conference
- Nickname: Cougars
- Website: www.carroll.k12.in.us/o/jr-sr-high

Carroll Junior/Senior High School is a public secondary school located in Flora, Indiana. The school serves about 550 students in grades 7 to 12 in the Carroll Consolidated School Corporation district.

== Demographics ==
The demographic breakdown of the 337 students enrolled in 2021–2022 was:

- Male - 51.6%
- Female - 48.4%
- Asian - <1.0%
- Black - <1.0%
- Hispanic - 4.7%
- White - 92.0%
- Multiracial - 2.4%

28.8% of the students were eligible for free or reduced lunch.

== Athletics ==
Carroll Jr./Sr. High School is a member of the Indiana High School Athletic Association and competes in the Hoosier Heartland Conference. The school mascot is the Cougar and the school colors are royal blue and white. Carroll won the IHSAA Class A State football championship during the 1995–1996 school year.

FALL

- Varsity Football
- Boys/Girls Cross Country
- Varsity Boys Tennis
- Varsity Girls Volleyball
- Varsity Cheerleading
- Varsity Boys Soccer

WINTER

- Girls Varsity Basketball
- Boys Varsity Basketball
- Boys Varsity Wrestling
- Girls Varsity Swimming
- Boys Varsity Swimming

SPRING

- Varsity Baseball
- Varsity Golf
- Varsity Boys/Girls Track
- Varsity Girls Tennis
- Varsity Girls Softball

== Notable alumni ==
- Brandon Dillon, football player

== See also ==
- List of high schools in Indiana
