= Sheridan High School (Indiana) =

Location
- 24185 North Hinesley Road; Sheridan, Indiana 46069; United States; 40°08′22″N 86°12′57″W

Information
- Type: Public high school
- School district: Sheridan Community Schools
- Principal: Rick Davis
- Teaching staff: 30.50 (FTE)
- Grades: 9-12
- Enrollment: 336 (2023-2024)
- Student to teacher ratio: 11.02
- Color
- Athletics conference: Hoosier Heartland Conference
- Team name: Blackhawks
- Website: www.scs.k12.in.us/shs/

Sheridan High School is a public high school located in Sheridan, Indiana in the northwestern part of Hamilton County. It is the smallest public high school in Hamilton County, being less than half the size of Hamilton Heights, and the entire student body being less than a single grade of Westfield, Fishers, Noblesville, Hamilton Southeastern, or Carmel.

== Athletics ==
Sheridan is a perennial powerhouse in Indiana's Class 1A football, having been to and won nine state championships in their history including in 1980, 1984, 1987, 1988, 1992, 1998, 2005, 2006, and 2007 under coach Larry "Bud" Wright, Indiana Football Hall of Fame coach.

== Notable alumni ==
- Frank C. McConnell (1916), US Army brigadier general

== See also ==
- List of high schools in Indiana
