= Peru Community Schools =

School district in Miami County, Indiana, US

Location
- Peru, Indiana United States

District information
- Superintendent: Trent McCormick

Students and staff
- Students: 2,323

Other information
- Website: Official website

Peru Community Schools (PCS) is a public school district in Peru, Indiana, United States. It is responsible for two elementary schools, one combined junior/senior high school, and one alternative school. The school district's current enrollment is about 2,323 students. Peru High School has a 96% graduation rate. And the district has approximately 84% state ISTEP pass rate for Math and 86% pass rate of state ISTEP in Language Arts. Peru Community Schools has been recognized as a high growth and achievement school over the past 5 years.

== Schools ==
| School | Principal | Grades | Enrollment |
|---|---|---|---|
| Keys Academy (Alternative School) | ? | K–12 | 165 |
| Elmwood Elementary | Kristi Eddy | K–2 | 568 |
| Blair Pointe Upper Elementary | Clint Mathews | 3–6 | 623 |
| Peru Jr./Sr. High School | Julie Scheurich | 7–12 | 987 |

Source: School Data: Peru Community Schools 2009

== See also ==
- List of school districts in Indiana
