= Hy-Red Gasoline Station =

- U.S. National Register of Historic Places
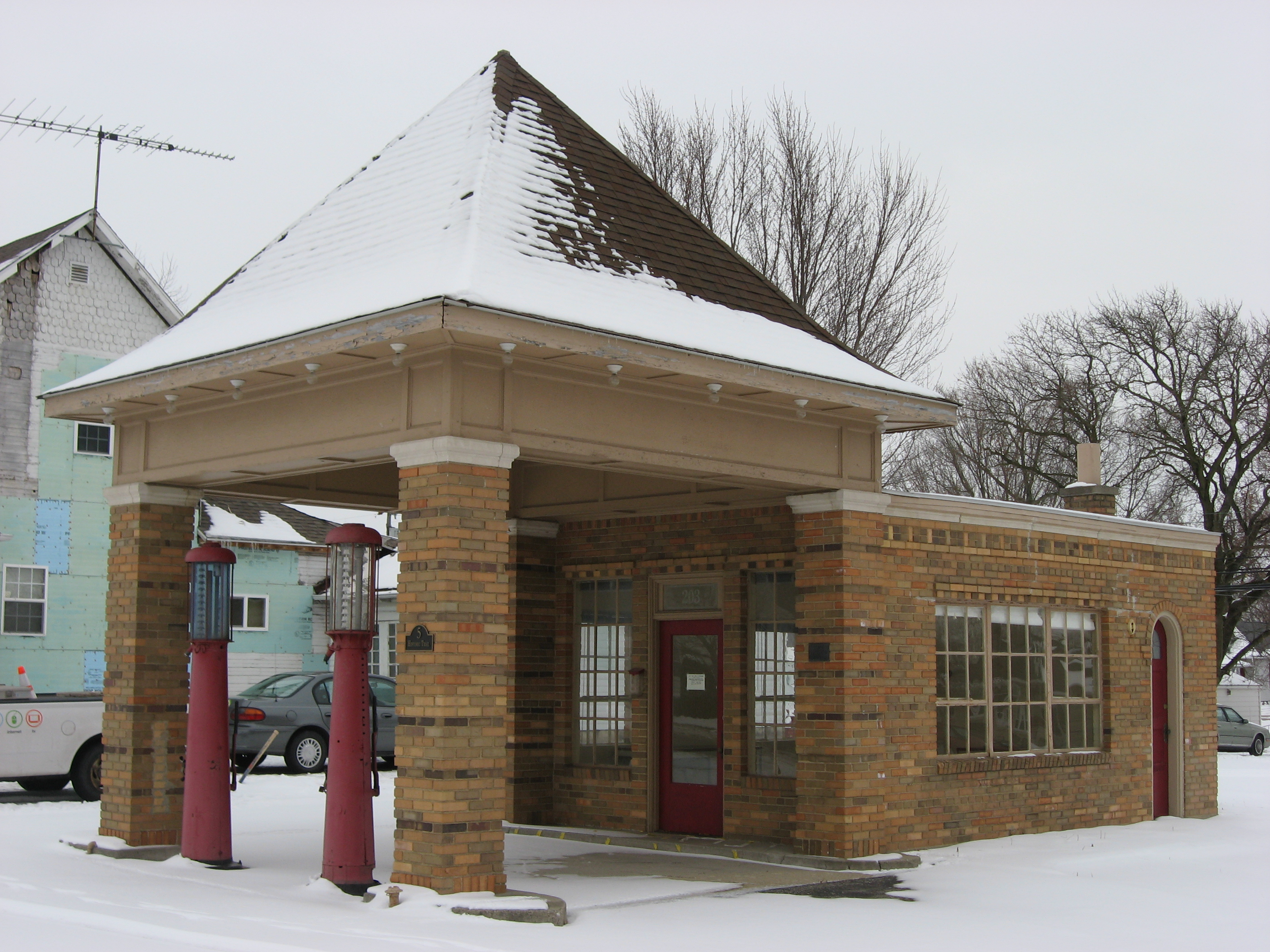
- Hy-Red Gasoline Station, January 2011

- Location within Indiana Location within the United States
- Location: 203 E. Main St., Greentown, Indiana
- Coordinates: 40°28′40″N 85°57′53″W
- Area: less than one acre
- Built: 1930
- NRHP reference No.: 83000035
- Added to NRHP: September 1, 1983

Hy-Red Gasoline Station, also known as the Hy-Red Gulf Filling Station, is a historic filling station located at Greentown, Indiana. It was built in 1930, and consists of two sections. They are a projecting canopy or porte cochere with a steeply pitched roof supported by four pillars and a one-story small office building. Both sections include multi-colored brown and beige glazed brick. From 1939 to about 1958 it operated as a Gulf Oil filling station and thereafter housed a number of commercial enterprises including a Hickory Farms cheese shop.

It was listed on the National Register of Historic Places in 1983.
