= Rossville Jr/Sr High School =

Rossville Junior/Senior High School

Location
- 1 Robert Egly Drive; Rossville, Indiana 46065; United States; 40.414059°N 86.597640°W

Information
- Type: Public high school
- Established: 1896
- School district: Rossville Community School District
- Superintendent: James Hanna
- Principal: Michael Hammons
- Teaching staff: 39.50 (on an FTE basis)
- Grades: 6–12
- Enrollment: 473 (2023–24)
- Student to teacher ratio: 11.97
- Color
- Athletics conference: Hoosier Heartland Conference
- Mascot: Buzzy
- Nickname: Hornets
- Rivals: Carroll Jr-Sr High School
- Newspaper: The Sting
- Website: rmhs.rcsd.k12.in.us

Rossville Junior/Senior High School is a middle school and high school located in Rossville, Indiana, United States. It serves grades 6–12 and is part of the Rossville Consolidated Schools.

== Demographics ==
The demographic breakdown of the 473 students enrolled in 2023–24 was:

- Male - 52.6%
- Female - 47.4%
- American Indian/Alaska Native - <1.0%
- Asian - <1.0%
- Black - 1.1%
- Hispanic - 4.2%
- White - 92.0%
- Multiracial - 2.1%

26.8% of the students were eligible for free or reduced-cost lunch.

== Athletics ==
The Rossville Hornets compete in the Hoosier Heartland Conference. The school colors are red and white. The following Indiana High School Athletic Association (IHSAA) sports are offered:

- Baseball (boys)
  - State championship - 2000
- Basketball (girls and boys)
  - Boys state championship - 2002
- Cross country (girls and boys)
- Golf (girls and boys)
- Soccer (girls and boys)
- Softball (girls)
  - State championship - 2024
- Tennis (girls and boys)
- Track (girls and boys)
- Volleyball (girls)
- Wrestling (boys)

== See also ==
- List of high schools in Indiana
