= Greentown Glass Museum =

- Established: 1969
- Location: 112 N Meridian St, Greentown, Indiana
- Coordinates: 40.4782°N 85.9666°W
- Type: Glass museum
- Collection size: 700
- Nearest parking: Street
- Website: greentownglass.org

The Greentown Glass Museum features locally made glass items and is located at 112 N Meridian Street in Greentown City Hall, Greentown, Indiana. Items include vases, mugs, pitchers, salt cellars, toothpick holders, covered dishes topped by hens, cats, and rabbits, and other decorative items. There is also an exhibit with examples of all the patterns and colors of glass made by the local factory. The items were created beginning in 1894 by the Indiana Tumbler and Goblet Factory, which was sold in 1899 to the National Glass Company, and then shut down the factory in 1903 when a fire destroyed the building.

The museum was incorporated in 1969. Turn-of-the-century pharmacy cases were donated to the museum by Hook's Drug Stores in order to display the glass. "The Greentown Glass Museum displays over seven hundred glassware articles, and the town hosts an annual Greentown Glass Festival on the second weekend in June, marking the anniversary of the factory's demise and the close of a short but significant period in the history of this Howard County town."
