= Hemlock, Indiana =

- Unincorporated community and Census-designated place
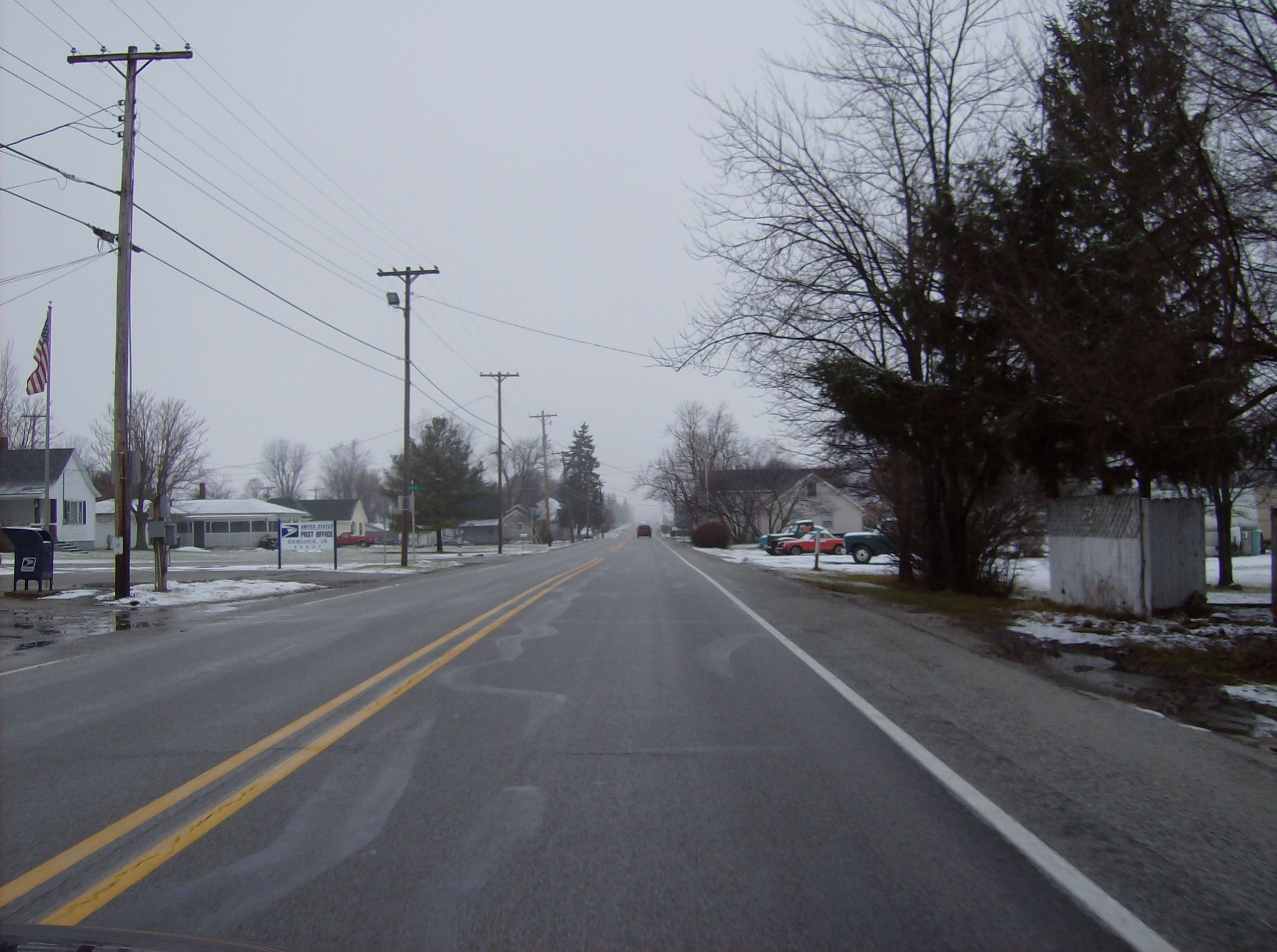
- Along State Road 26 in Hemlock

- Location within Indiana Location within the United States
- Coordinates: 40°25′09″N 86°02′31″W
- Country: United States
- State: Indiana
- County: Howard
- Township: Taylor
- Elevation: 860 ft (260 m)
- ZIP code: 46937
- Area code: 765
- GNIS feature ID: 2830413

Hemlock (originally called Terre Hall) is an unincorporated community in southern Taylor Township, Howard County, Indiana, United States. It lies at the intersection of State Road 26 with County Road 450E.

Hemlock is part of the Kokomo, Indiana Metropolitan Statistical Area.

== History ==
Hemlock was laid out in 1852. It was originally known as Terre Halle, but was renamed Hemlock before 1881.

== Demographics ==
The United States Census Bureau delineated Hemlock as a census designated place in the 2022 American Community Survey.
