= Eastern Howard School Corporation =

School district in Indiana

Address
- 221 West Main Suite One Greentown, Indiana, 46936; United States

District information
- Type: Public
- Grades: K–12
- NCES District ID: 1803150

Students and staff
- Students: 1,522 (2020–2021)
- Teachers: 94.14 (FTE)
- Staff: 101.12 (FTE)
- Student–teacher ratio: 16.17:1

Other information
- Website: www.eastern.k12.in.us

Eastern Howard School Corporation is located in Greentown, Indiana. Eastern Schools is a public school district which serves Greentown, Indiana and eastern Howard County, Indiana.

== History ==
Public schooling in the area began in 1850. The merged school district dates back to 1950. Listed in the US News, Best High Schools in Indiana. In 2017 the school was ranked in the 2017 Best School Districts in Indiana.

== Mascot ==
The school mascot is the Comet, as seen in the school logo.

== Administration ==
- Dr. Tracy Caddell, Superintendent (2008–2017)
- Dr. Keith Richie (2018–present)

== Building directory ==
- Eastern Elementary School
- Eastern Jr./Sr. High School
