= Lewis Cass High School =

Location
- 6422 East SR 218; Walton, Cass County, Indiana 46994; United States
- Coordinates: 40.662817°N 86.251406°W

Information
- Type: Public high school
- School district: Lewis Cass Schools
- Superintendent: Steve Darnell (interim superintendent)
- Principal: Matthew Smith; Don Young; Mandi Bielanski (assistant); Abby Isenburg (assistant)
- Faculty: 31.50 (on an FTE basis)
- Grades: 9-12
- Enrollment: 389 (2023–24)
- Student to teacher ratio: 12.35
- Color(s)
- Team name: Kings
- Website: Official website

Lewis Cass High School is a high school located in Walton, Indiana, United States. It is a part of Lewis Cass Schools. It was formerly named Lewis Cass Jr./Sr. High School before a reorganization of Thompson Elementary, Galveston Elementary, and the middle school resulted in all schools in the corporation bearing the Lewis Cass name.

== Athletics ==
Lewis Cass athletic teams currently compete in the Hoosier Athletic Conference, following the disbanding of the Mid-Indiana Conference in 2015, and will compete in the Three Rivers Conference starting with the 2023–2024 school year.

The 2002–2003 Kings boys basketball team finished the season with a 26–0 record to become the 8th team in state history to have an undefeated season.

The Kings have won 3 IHSAA state championships.

IHSAA State Championships
Sport	Year(s)
Boys Basketball (1)	2003
Softball (2)	2006, 2008

== See also ==
- List of high schools in Indiana
