= North Miami Middle/High School =

Location
- 570 E C.R. 900 N Denver, Miami County, Indiana 46926; United States
- 40°53′47″N 86°03′57″W

Information
- Type: Public high school/middle school
- Established: 1961
- School district: North Miami Community Schools
- Principal: Karise Kabage
- Teaching staff: 30.00 (FTE)
- Grades: 7-12
- Enrollment: 388 (2023–2024)
- Student to teacher ratio: 12.93
- Color
- Athletics: Indiana High School Athletic Association
- Athletics conference: Three Rivers Conference
- Team name: Warriors
- Website: nmmhs.nmcs.k12.in.us

North Miami Middle/High School is a combination middle and high school located in Miami County, Denver, Indiana, United States. The school is part of North Miami Community Schools.

== Athletics ==
North Miami has won state championships in football (1993–94) and softball (2013–14).

== Notable alumni ==
- Ruth Riley, former WNBA player
- Ethan Manning, member of the Indiana House of Representatives
