= Rochester High School (Indiana) =

Location
- 1 Zebra Lane; Rochester, Fulton County, Indiana 46975; USA; 41°03′27″N 86°13′27″W

Information
- Type: Public high school
- Motto: Education to Build 21st Century Skills
- Established: 1965 (Consolidation of Rochester High School and Richland Center High School)
- School district: Rochester Community School Corporation
- Principal: Oscar Haughs
- Teaching staff: 43.83 (FTE)
- Grades: 9–12
- Enrollment: 201 (2023–2024)
- Student to teacher ratio: 4.59
- Colors: Black, gold, and white
- Athletics: IHSAA: 2A (Football); 3A (All Other Sports)
- Athletics conference: Three Rivers Conference
- Team name: Zebras
- Rivals: Tippecanoe Valley
- Newspaper: Zebra Tales
- Yearbook: Manitou Ripples
- Gym Capacity: 2321
- Website: rhs.zebras.net

Rochester High School was formed when the high schools of Rochester and Richland Center combined in 1965. Students in grades 9–12 of the town of Rochester and several of the rural townships of Fulton County attend. The first class of Rochester High School was in 1880, and there have been several different buildings housing the school. The current Rochester High School building was designed by Everett Brown Company and opened in the fall of 1965 to the south of the Rochester City Park. Barnhart Field, home of Zebra football, was constructed in the 1970s at the east end of the school campus, and additional wrestling space and a second gymnasium were added later.

Students have the opportunity to take Advanced Placement coursework and exams. The AP participation rate at Rochester High School is 24%. Rochester Community High School is the only high school in the Rochester Community School Corporation.

== Student Demographic Information ==
White: 87.5%

Hispanic: 6.3%

Multiracial: 4.0%

Native American: 1.0%

African American: 0.8%

Asian: 0.4%

Free/Reduced Meals: 45.5%

== See also ==
- List of high schools in Indiana
