= Oak Hill High School (Indiana) =

Location
- 7756 W Delphi Pike 27; Converse, Indiana 46919; United States; 40.579319°N 85.821725°W

Information
- Established: 1959
- Superintendent: Sheri Hardman
- Principal: Brad Smith
- Teaching staff: 31.33 (FTE)
- Grades: 9–12
- Student to teacher ratio: 17.33
- Color
- Fight song: The Victors (University of Michigan)
- Athletics conference: Central Indiana Conference
- Sports: Soccer, Football, Basketball, Swimming, Golf, Wrestling, Volleyball, Cross Country, Track, Softball, Baseball
- Mascot: Golden Eagle
- Team name: Golden Eagles
- Rival: Eastbrook High School
- Yearbook: Inflight
- Website: www.ohusc.k12.in.us/o/ohhs

Oak Hill High School is a high school located outside of Converse, Indiana, United States. The School was founded in 1959, combining nearby high schools Sweetser, Swayzee, and Converse. Currently, there are three elementary schools in the school district, located in these towns. The junior high is connected to the high school.

== Athletics ==
The Golden Eagles compete in the Central Indiana Conference (CIC). They switched to the CIC in 2006 after formerly being in the Three Rivers Conference (TRC) and the Mid-Indiana Conference (MIC). Oak Hill is known to have had a strong football tradition, winning the Class A state championship in 1982. More recently, Oak Hill has been known for the success of their girls' basketball program. The girls' team was Class 2A state runner-up in the 2007–08 and 2008–09 seasons, as well as the 2016–2017 season. They then won a state championship in 2018–19. The Oak Hill boys' basketball program won a 2A state championship in the 2017–18 season. Oak Hill's boys' swimming and diving team set a school record for 100 consecutive dual meet wins in 2011. Girls' high jumper Janae Moffitt won the 2013 state championship with a jump of 5'10". Boys' diver Caden Lake won a state championship in diving in 2019. In the 2024–25 season, the swim program became a founding member of the East Central Swimming Conference (ECSC) The girls won the first title, with boys being runners-up. In 2025, Grant Cates won the state championship in diving, breaking the record set over 20 years before. The following season, both boys and girls teams won the conference title. The boys team went undefeated, broke every school record, and placed 6th at state, an all-time high for small schools. The state team consisted of freshman Cooper McQuiston, sophomore Braylon Carey, and seniors Cael McCann and Evan Bledsoe.

== Notable alumni ==
- Monte Towe - former NBA player for the Denver Nuggets
- Keith O'Conner Murphy - Rockabilly Hall of Fame singer-songwriter, Stacy and King Records (United States), Polydor Records (England)
- Laurell K. Hamilton (a.k.a. Lori Klein) - The New York Times best-selling author

== See also ==
- List of high schools in Indiana
