= Northfield Junior-Senior High School =

Location
- 154 West 200 North; Wabash, Wabash County, Indiana 46992; United States; 40°51′17″N 85°47′44″W

Information
- School district: Metropolitan School District of Wabash County
- Principal: Jay Snyder
- Teaching staff: 31.50 (FTE)
- Grades: 7-12
- Enrollment: 437 (2023-24)
- Student to teacher ratio: 13.87
- Colors: Royal blue and gray
- Athletics conference: Three Rivers Conference
- Nickname: Norsemen
- Website: northfield.msdwc.org

Northfield Junior-Senior High School is a 7-12 secondary school in Wabash, Indiana. It is one of three junior-senior high schools in the Metropolitan School District of Wabash County.

== Demographics ==
The demographic breakdown of the 487 students enrolled in 2013-2014 was:

- Male - 53.4%
- Female - 46.6%
- Native American/Alaskan - 0.6%
- Asian/Pacific islanders - 0.6%
- Black - 0.4%
- Hispanic - 1.8%
- White - 95.1%
- Multiracial - 1.5%

35.9% of the students were eligible for free or reduced price lunch.

== Athletics ==
The Northfield Norsemen compete in the Three Rivers Conference. The school colors are royal blue and grey. The following IHSAA sanctioned sports are offered:

- Baseball (boys)
  - State champions - 2001, 2012
- Cross country (girls & boys)
- Football (boys)
- Golf (girls & boys)
- Softball (girls)
- Tennis (girls)
- Track (girls & boys)
- Volleyball (girls)
- Wrestling (boys)

== See also ==
- List of high schools in Indiana
