= Walton, Indiana =

Town of Walton
- Town
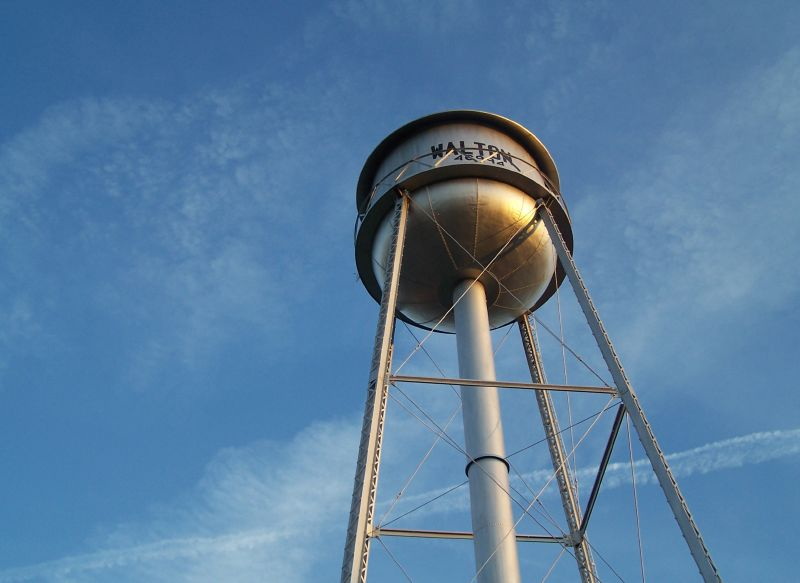
- Former Walton Water Tower

- Location of Walton in Cass County, Indiana.
- Coordinates: 40°39′44″N 86°14′51″W
- Country: United States
- State: Indiana
- County: Cass
- Township: Tipton

Area
  - Total: 0.43 sq mi (1.11 km^{2})
  - Land: 0.43 sq mi (1.11 km^{2})
  - Water: 0 sq mi (0.00 km^{2})
- Elevation: 771 ft (235 m)

Population (2020)
  - Total: 962
  - Density: 2,249.8/sq mi (868.64/km^{2})
- Time zone: UTC-5 (Eastern (EST))
  - Summer (DST): UTC-4 (EDT)
- ZIP code: 46994
- Area code: 574
- FIPS code: 18-79964
- GNIS feature ID: 2397720

Walton is a town in Tipton Township, Cass County, Indiana, United States. The population was 962 at the 2020 census.

== History ==
Walton had its start in the year 1852 by the building of the railroad through that territory. It was named for its founder Gilbert W. Wall. The Walton post office was established in 1856.

== Geography ==
According to the 2010 census, Walton has a total area of 0.43 square miles (1.11 km^{2}), all land.

== Demographics ==
Historical population
Census	Pop.	Note	%±
1880	453		—
1890	469		3.5%
1900	498		6.2%
1910	579		16.3%
1920	713		23.1%
1930	685		−3.9%
1940	710		3.6%
1950	837		17.9%
1960	1,079		28.9%
1970	1,054		−2.3%
1980	1,202		14.0%
1990	1,053		−12.4%
2000	1,069		1.5%
2010	1,049		−1.9%
2020	962		−8.3%
U.S. Decennial Census

=== 2010 census ===
As of the census of 2010, there were 1,049 people, 408 households, and 284 families living in the town. The population density was 2,439.5 inhabitants per square mile (941.9/km^{2}). There were 449 housing units at an average density of 1,044.2 per square mile (403.2/km^{2}). The racial makeup of the town was 93.2% White, 0.3% African American, 0.1% Native American, 0.3% Asian, 4.5% from other races, and 1.6% from two or more races. Hispanic or Latino of any race were 9.5% of the population.

There were 408 households, of which 38.2% had children under the age of 18 living with them, 51.0% were married couples living together, 12.5% had a female householder with no husband present, 6.1% had a male householder with no wife present, and 30.4% were non-families. 27.5% of all households were made up of individuals, and 13.9% had someone living alone who was 65 years of age or older. The average household size was 2.57 and the average family size was 3.11.

The median age in the town was 36.4 years. 27.5% of residents were under the age of 18; 8.7% were between the ages of 18 and 24; 25.2% were from 25 to 44; 23.6% were from 45 to 64; and 15% were 65 years of age or older. The gender makeup of the town was 46.6% male and 53.4% female.

=== 2000 census ===
As of the census of 2000, there were 1,069 people, 413 households, and 301 families living in the town. The population density was 2,477.8 inhabitants per square mile (956.7/km^{2}). There were 438 housing units at an average density of 1,015.2 per square mile (392.0/km^{2}). The racial makeup of the town was 92.42% White, 0.19% African American, 0.75% Native American, 0.09% Asian, 5.89% from other races, and 0.65% from two or more races. Hispanic or Latino of any race were 10.66% of the population.

There were 413 households, out of which 34.6% had children under the age of 18 living with them, 57.9% were married couples living together, 11.6% had a female householder with no husband present, and 26.9% were non-families. 24.5% of all households were made up of individuals, and 11.1% had someone living alone who was 65 years of age or older. The average household size was 2.59 and the average family size was 3.08.

In the town, the population was spread out, with 28.2% under the age of 18, 7.8% from 18 to 24, 28.3% from 25 to 44, 22.9% from 45 to 64, and 12.9% who were 65 years of age or older. The median age was 36 years. For every 100 females, there were 89.9 males. For every 100 females age 18 and over, there were 82.0 males.

The median income for a household in the town was $41,429, and the median income for a family was $49,167. Males had a median income of $30,750 versus $23,846 for females. The per capita income for the town was $19,087. About 2.9% of families and 6.0% of the population were below the poverty line, including 5.8% of those under age 18 and 5.4% of those age 65 or over.

== Education ==
Lewis Cass High School is located near Walton, and is a part of the Southeastern School Corporation.

Lewis Cass High School competes in the Three Rivers Conference for all athletics. It left the Mid-Indiana Conference in the 2015–2016 school year to join the Hoosier Conference when the Mid-Indiana Conference dissolved, then left the Hoosier Conference to replace Tippecanoe Valley.
