= Brandon Dillon (American football) =

American football player (born 1997)

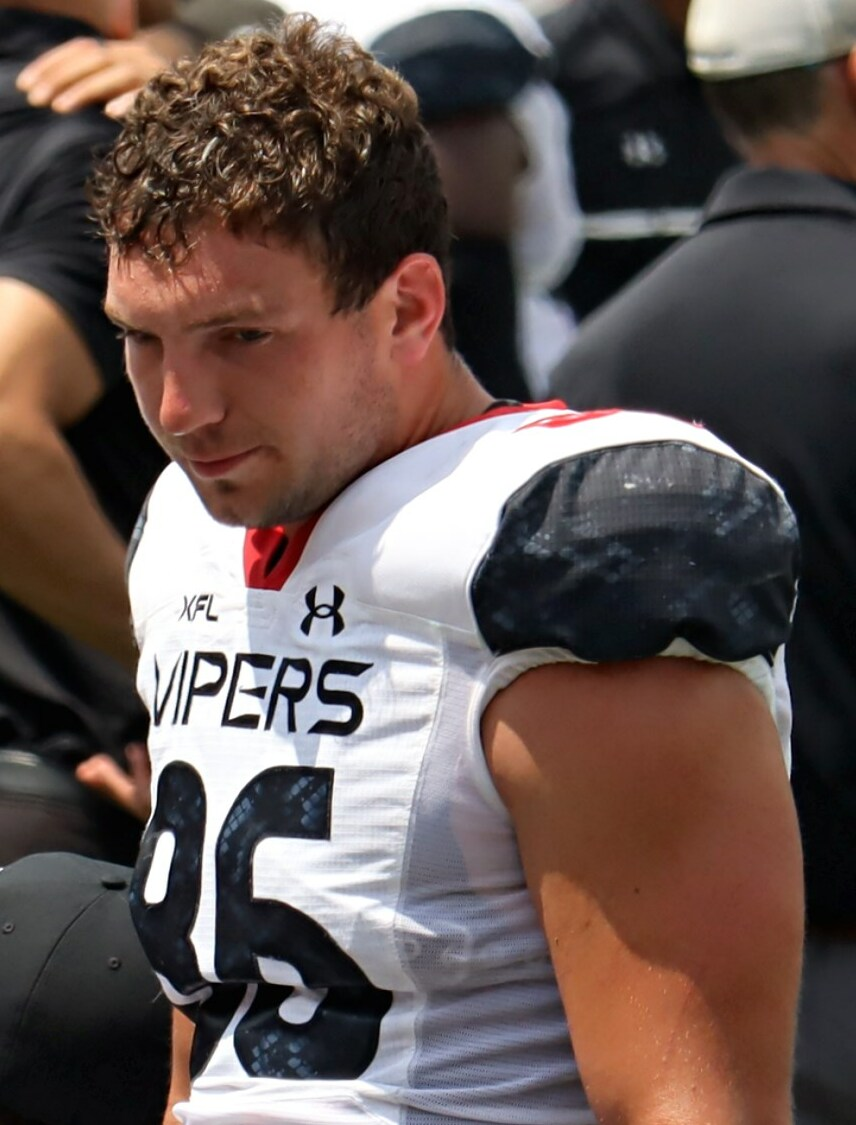
- Dillon with the Vegas Vipers in 2023

No. 86
- Position: Tight end

Personal information
- Born: April 30, 1997 (age 29); Bringhurst, Indiana, U.S.
- Listed height: 6 ft 5 in (1.96 m)
- Listed weight: 250 lb (113 kg)

Career information
- High school: Carroll (Flora, Indiana)
- College: Marian (IN) (2015–2018)
- NFL draft: 2019: undrafted

Career history
- Minnesota Vikings (2019–2021); New York Jets (2021–2022)*; New Orleans Saints (2022)*; Vegas Vipers (2023); Washington Commanders (2023)
- * Offseason or practice squad member only

Awards and highlights
- NAIA national champion (2015); First-team NAIA All-American (2018); 2× First-team All-MSFA (2017, 2018)

Career NFL statistics as of 2023
- Receptions: 1
- Receiving yards: 6
- Stats at Pro Football Reference

Brandon Dillon (born April 30, 1997) is an American former professional football player who was a tight end in the National Football League (NFL). He played college football for the Marian Knights and was a member of the Minnesota Vikings, New York Jets, New Orleans Saints, Vegas Vipers, and Washington Commanders.

== Early life ==
Dillon grew up in Bringhurst, Indiana and attended Carroll High School in nearby Flora, Indiana, where he played baseball, basketball, and football. In football, Dillon was a four-year starter on both offense and defense and was named All-Area by the Kokomo Tribune twice and was a two-time Class A All-State selection, as well as all-area by the Lafayette Journal & Courier. He was also a two-time All-Area selection in basketball. He was recruited by FBS programs Bowling Green, Toledo and Ohio University to join their programs as a preferred walk-on, however Dillon would accept a football scholarship from nearby Marian University, an NAIA school.

== College career ==
Dillon was a member Marian Knights for four seasons and was a freshman when the team won the 2015 NAIA National Championship. As a senior, Dillon caught 35 passes for 603 yards and five touchdowns and was named a first-team NAIA All-American. After the season he was the only NAIA player to be invited to participate in the 2017 NFLPA Collegiate Bowl. Dillon finished his collegiate career with 105 receptions for 1,661 receiving yards and 14 touchdowns in 42 games played.

== Professional career ==
Pre-draft measurables
Height	Weight	Arm length	Hand span	40-yard dash	10-yard split	20-yard split	20-yard shuttle	Three-cone drill	Vertical jump	Broad jump	Bench press
6 ft 3 7/8 in (1.93 m)	248 lb (112 kg)	31 1/4 in (0.79 m)	9 3/8 in (0.24 m)	4.77 s	1.66 s	2.75 s	4.33 s	7.05 s	32.5 in (0.83 m)	9 ft 9 in (2.97 m)	19 reps
All values from Pro Day

=== Minnesota Vikings ===
Dillon signed with the Minnesota Vikings as an undrafted free agent on April 27, 2019. Considered a long shot to make the team, Dillon made the Vikings' 53-man roster out of training camp. He made his NFL debut in the Vikings season opener on September 8, 2019. He was waived on September 10, 2019, and re-signed to the Vikings practice squad the next day. He signed a reserve/future contract with the Vikings on January 12, 2020.

Dillon was waived by the Vikings during final roster cuts on September 5, 2020, and was signed to the practice squad the next day. He was elevated to the active roster on November 15, November 28, and December 5 for the team's weeks 10, 12, and 13 games against the Chicago Bears, Carolina Panthers, and Jacksonville Jaguars, and reverted to the practice squad after each game. He was placed on the practice squad/injured list on December 8. He was placed on the practice squad/COVID-19 list by the team on December 29, and signed a reserve/future contract with the Vikings on January 5, 2021. He was released by the Vikings on September 18, 2021, and re-signed to their practice squad. Dillon was waived on December 28.

=== New York Jets ===
On December 29, 2021, Dillon was signed to the New York Jets practice squad. He signed a reserve/future contract on January 10, 2022. He was waived on May 9, 2022.

=== New Orleans Saints ===
On June 21, 2022, Dillon signed with the New Orleans Saints. He was released on August 3, 2022.

=== Vegas Vipers ===
Dillon played for the Vegas Vipers of the XFL in 2023. He was released from his contract on May 25, 2023.

=== Washington Commanders ===
Dillon signed with the Washington Commanders on May 30, 2023. On August 29, 2023, he was placed on injured reserve.
