= Center, Indiana =

- Unincorporated community and Census-designated place
- Location within Indiana Location within the United States
- Coordinates: 40°26′12″N 86°03′34″W
- Country: United States
- State: Indiana
- County: Howard
- Township: Taylor
- Elevation: 843 ft (257 m)
- ZIP code: 46902
- FIPS code: 18-11404
- GNIS feature ID: 2830412

Center (originally called Tampico) is an unincorporated community in Taylor Township, Howard County, Indiana, United States. Center is a suburb of Kokomo and is a part of the Kokomo, Indiana Metropolitan Statistical Area.

== History ==
Center was laid out in 1852. It was originally named Tampico, after the Mexican port, but because there is another Tampico in Jackson County it was renamed Centre (later Center) for its central location in the county.

== Education ==
Center is served by the Taylor Community Schools Corporation. Taylor High School competes in the Hoosier Heartland Conference (HHC) for athletics.

== Demographics ==
The United States Census Bureau delineated Center as a census designated place in the 2022 American Community Survey.
