= Southwood Junior-Senior High School =

Location
- 564 East SR 124; Wabash, Wabash County, Indiana 46992; United States; 40°44′24″N 85°46′50″W

Information
- Motto: Respect, Responsibility, and Personal Best
- School district: Metropolitan School District of Wabash County
- NCES District ID: 1812180
- Principal: Amber Lewis
- Teaching staff: 32.00 (FTE)
- Grades: 6-12
- Enrollment: 457 (2023-24)
- Student to teacher ratio: 14.28
- Colors: Red and gray
- Athletics conference: Three Rivers Conference
- Team name: Knights
- Website: Official Website

Southwood Junior-Senior High School is a combined Junior and Senior High School in Wabash, Indiana.

== Demographics ==
The demographic breakdown of the 516 students enrolled in 2014-15 was:

- Male - 48.1%
- Female - 51.9%
- Native American/Alaskan - 0%
- Asian/Pacific islanders - 0%
- Black - 0.4%
- Hispanic - 1.7%
- White - 96.5%
- Multiracial - 1.4%

30.6% of the students were eligible for free or reduced lunch.

== Athletics ==
The Southwood Knights compete in the Three Rivers Conference. The school colors are red, grey and black. The following IHSAA sanctioned sports are offered:

- Baseball (boys)
- Basketball (boys and girls)
- Cross country (boys and girls)
- Football (boys)
  - State champions - 2002
- Golf (boys and girls)
- Softball (girls)
- Tennis (girls)
- Track (boys and girls)
- Volleyball (girls)
  - State champions - 2023 (1A)
- Wrestling (boys)

== See also ==
- List of high schools in Indiana
