= Maconaquah High School =

American public high school

Location
- 256 East 800 South; Bunker Hill, Indiana 46914; United States
- Coordinates: 40°39′6″N 83°3′56″W

Information
- Type: Public high school
- Motto: “Inspiring and empowering our students to meet tomorrow's challenges.”
- Established: July 1, 1962
- School district: Maconaquah School Corporation
- Principal: David Durkes
- Teaching staff: 33.50 (on an FTE basis)
- Grades: 9-12
- Enrollment: 604 (2023-2024)
- Student to teacher ratio: 18.03
- Campus type: Rural
- Color
- Athletics conference: Three Rivers
- Nickname: Braves
- Website: mhs.maconaquah.k12.in.us

Maconaquah High School is located at 256 E 800 South, just outside the city limits of Bunker Hill, Indiana. The building houses grades 9–12 and functions as the primary athletic building. It is the only high school in the Maconaquah School Corporation.

== History ==
On July 1, 1962, Maconaquah School Corporation was formed by consolidating two high schools (Clay and Bunker Hill) in southern Miami County, Indiana. The corporation is named after Frances Slocum, who was captured as a child by Delaware Indians in 1778 from her Pennsylvania home. She grew up with the Miami tribe and married a Miami Indian Chief. She lived in the area near Peru, Indiana, and became known as "Little Bear Woman" or Maconaquah. She is buried in a state historical site near the corporation boundaries.

Maconaquah class of 1964 attended classes in the old Bunker Hill High School. A sign in the front yard read "Maconaquah High School". The current high school facility, located approximately 2 miles from Bunker Hill, Indiana, proper, held its first classes in August 1965. The following year the building proper was finished and the class of 1966 was the first to attend in MHS. Three years later, the Industrial Arts/Agriculture Wing was added on, allowing students to gain insight into different trades and career paths. In 1973, a social studies wing was added to which the next addition connected to that addition. In 1976, the Fine Arts Wing was added, expanding the school, with the additions including a 900+ seat auditorium with a full scene shop, a band room, a choral chamber, a green room, a black-box theater (later converted into a television studio), as well as numerous classrooms. The first event held in the auditorium was in Spring 1976; the "Pow-wow", a student talent/skit event, was held on 3 nights, Thursday to Saturday. The next addition was made in the 1980s, including a west wing with a swimming pool, second gym and other rooms. The most recent addition was the remodeling of the Science and Business Department in 2005; the science laboratories were updated, and an additional lab was built.

The building has two multi-purpose computer labs, CAD lab, accounting lab, Cisco Network Academy, and a graphic arts lab. Each teacher has a room computer with access to Internet, Web and various programs. Teachers also have access to video, digital cameras, VCR, laser disc, film strip, CD-Rom, still video, 35mm slides, 16mm film, satellite TV, in-house TV, and voice mail. The high school continues to serve constituents of six townships in southern Miami County (population: approximately 36,000). The district includes a farming community and nine small towns or communities and includes Grissom Air Reserve Base.

When the Bunker Hill AFB/Grissom AFB was an active duty base, as much as 45% of the student population were air base connected. The Grissom AFB base became a reserve wing in the mid-1990s. Until that time, there were approximately 1,100 homes on the air base feeding Maconaquah Schools. For many years (especially in the 1970s), the high school had 8 periods a day, starting at 7 a.m. and going until 3:30. Students from base housing attended periods 1–7 (7 a.m. to 2:30 p.m.), whereas the rest attended periods 2–8 (8 a.m. to 3:30 p.m.). This was done due to the size of the school population, which was approximately 1,100 students, as well as the number of school buses needed. When the 1976 and later additions to the building were done, due to the high percentage of military connected families, the school corporation received large amounts of federal aid which allowed these expansions with relatively no debt to the taxpayers.

== Demographics ==
The demographic breakdown of the 656 students enrolled in 2015-2016 was:

- Male - 50.2%
- Female - 49.8%
- Native American/Alaskan - 1.1%
- Asian/Pacific islanders - 1.4%
- Black - 2.1%
- Hispanic - 3.0%
- White - 86.7%
- Multiracial - 5.7%

45.0% of the students were eligible for free or reduced-cost lunch. In 2015–2016, this was a Title I school.

== Academics ==
Maconaquah High School (MHS) is accredited by the Indiana Department of Public Instruction.

=== Band Program ===
The Marching Braves competes in the Indiana State School Music Association (ISSMA) competitions. The (ISSMA) is the governing body of Indiana state marching band competition. Prior to ISSMA's formation, Maconaquah competed in the Northern Indiana School Band, Orchestra, and Vocal Association (NISBOVA) and All-State Band circuits beginning in 1971.

=== Performing Arts ===
A full performing arts curriculum is offered including Music History & Appreciation, Music Theory and Composition, Advanced Concert Band, Advanced Chorus, Intermediate Chorus, Vocal Jazz, Theatre Arts, Technical Theatre, and Dance Performance: Ballet, Modern, Ethnic-Folk. The Maconaquah Performing Arts Center includes a 900+ seat auditorium and scene shop, choral chamber, green room, and television studio/black box theatre. The full-time Performing Arts faculty includes one band director, one choral director, and one theatre/television teacher.

=== Speech and Debate ===
The forensics (speech) team has three Indiana High School Forensic Association (IHSFA) Class A State Championships, in 2002, 2003, and 2008, and has qualified for the National Forensic League (NFL)'s National Tournament 47 times as of 2008.

== Athletics ==
The Maconaquah Braves compete in the Three Rivers Conference. The school colors are red, white and Columbia blue. The following IHSAA sanctioned sports are offered:

- Baseball (boys)
- Basketball (girls & boys)
- Cross country (girls & boys)
- Football (boys)
- Golf (girls & boys)
- Soccer (girls & boys)
- Softball (girls)
- Swimming (girls & boys)
- Tennis (girls & boys)
- Track (girls & boys)
- Volleyball (girls)
- Wrestling (boys)

== Notable alumni ==
- Mike Otto, 2007 NFL draft selection of the Tennessee Titans
- Tavis Smiley, author, political commentator, and talk show host
- Gary Rardon, convicted serial killer
- Lorissa Sweet, member of the Indiana House of Representatives

== See also ==
- List of high schools in Indiana
