= Northwestern High School (Indiana) =

Location
- 3431 North County Road 400 West; Kokomo, Howard County, Indiana 46901; United States
- Coordinates: 40°31′31″N 86°12′11″W

Information
- Type: Public high school
- Established: 1948
- School district: Northwestern School Corporation
- Teaching staff: 39.00 (FTE)
- Grades: 9-12
- Enrollment: 541 (2024–2025)
- Student to teacher ratio: 13.87
- Color
- Athletics: Indiana High School Athletic Association
- Athletics conference: Hoosier Athletic Conference
- Team name: Tigers
- Website: School website

Northwestern High School is a public high school located approximately 4.5 miles northwest of the city limits of Kokomo, Indiana, United States. The building houses grades 9–12 and also functions as the primary athletic building.

== History ==
Northwestern High School was founded in 1948 as the result of a merge between Clay, Ervin, and Howard High Schools, during a period known as the "Consolidation Boom" when many other schools were also being consolidated. The Clay High School sign still stands outside the main entrance to the school. The school received its name because of its geographic location within Howard County, but the founders of the school also deliberately modeled the school after Northwestern University because of the university's reputation for scholastic excellence. Northwestern High School's school colors of purple and white and the school fight song "Go You Northwestern" were both directly adopted from Northwestern University. The school faced difficulties early in its history because it is located in a remote, rural area and there were no cities or towns included within its boundaries. Dayton Merrell, who graduated from the school in 1955 and has continued to live in the area ever since, remarked in an interview in 2017, "Sixty-eight years ago, that was a big deal... We had nothing but cornfields." The class of 1949, the first class to graduate from Northwestern, contained only forty-two students.

For the first seven years of its history, Northwestern did not have a gymnasium of any kind, so the school could only compete against other schools that would let them use their gymnasiums. As a result of this, for two years, Northwestern was the only school in the state that would compete against Crispus Attucks High School, an all-black high school in Indianapolis. Originally, basketball, baseball, and track were the only sports that Northwestern offered. Northwestern eventually became the first consolidated school to win the Kokomo Sectional against a top ten team in boys' basketball, a feat which the school replicated in both 1981 and 1982.

In 2006, the school added a new auditorium to its main campus. The addition was controversial at the time, but the superintendent Ryan Snoddy affirmed in 2017 that he still thought it was the best decision. In June 2012, the school installed a wind turbine, making it the first school in the county to attempt to harness wind energy. The school paid roughly $2.5 million on the windmill, with most of the interest being covered by the federal government. At the time, school officials expected that the windmill would probably result in around seven million dollars' worth in energy savings over the course of its projected twenty-five-year lifespan. In 2013, the school corporation adopted iPads for all students.

== Extracurricular activities ==
Northwestern competes in the Hoosier Athletic Conference, In 2007, the Northwestern Boys' Basketball team won the Indiana High School Boys Basketball Tournament. In 2018 and 2019, the Northwestern Girls' Basketball team won the Class 3A state title in the Indiana High School Girls Basketball Tournament.

In January 2018, Northwestern High School's State Competition Cast, Troupe 3924, earned highest distinction at the Indiana Thespian State Conference with their show Waylen and was selected as the Indiana Thespiana Chapter Select to compete at the International Thespian Festival in Lincoln, Nebraska in June of that year.

The Northwestern Music Department has been awarded the Indiana State School Music Association All-Music Award for the Total Department each year since the 2017–2018 school year, each year being the smallest high school by enrollment in the state of Indiana to achieve this award. The Northwestern Band program has earned the ISSMA All-Music Award for Bands each year beginning with the 2017–2018 school year.

== Notable alumni ==
- Brandon Beachy – former MLB pitcher
- Austin Parkinson – former Purdue basketball player. IUPUI Women's basketball coach.
- Samuel R. Allen – Chairman and CEO of John Deere
- Sylvia (singer) - Grammy nominated recording artist. 1982 Female Vocalist of the Year, Academy of Country Music. NHS Class of 1975

== See also ==
- List of high schools in Indiana
