= Eastern Junior-Senior High School =

Eastern High School
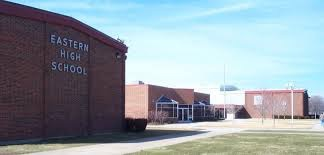

Location
- 421 South Harrison; Greentown, Indiana 46936; United States; 40°28′23″N 85°58′18″W

Information
- Type: Public high school
- Motto: "A tradition of excellence and a vision for tomorrow."
- Established: 1951
- School district: Eastern Howard School Corporation
- Principal: Brad Fugett
- Teaching staff: 27.50 (FTE)
- Grades: 9-12
- Enrollment: 499 (2023-24)
- Student to teacher ratio: 18.15
- Color
- Athletics conference: Hoosier Heartland Conference (HHC)
- Team name: Comets
- Website: Official Website

Eastern Junior-Senior High School is a public high school located in Greentown, Indiana serviced by the Eastern Howard School Corporation.

The school also contains the town's library, which doubles as the school's library. It is a part of the "Evergreen Indiana" network of libraries across Indiana.

== Demographics ==
The demographic breakdown of the 499 students enrolled for the 2023–2024 school year was:

- Male - 50.9%
- Female - 49.1%
- Native American/Alaskan - 0.6%
- Asian/Pacific islanders - 0.8%
- Black - 1.6%
- Hispanic - 4%
- White - 89.3%
- Multiracial - 3.6%

42.6% of the students were eligible for free or reduced lunch.

== Athletics ==
The Eastern Comets compete in the Hoosier Heartland Conference. The school colors are green and gold. Eastern offers the following sports:

- Baseball (boys)
- Basketball (girls & boys)
- Cross country (girls & boys)
- Football (boys)
- Golf (girls & boys)
- Softball (girls)
  - State champions - 2003, 2005
- Soccer (girls & boys)
- Swimming (girls & boys)
- Tennis (girls & boys)
- Track (girls & boys)
- Volleyball (girls)
- Wrestling (boys)

== See also ==
- List of high schools in Indiana
