= Greentown, Indiana =

- Town
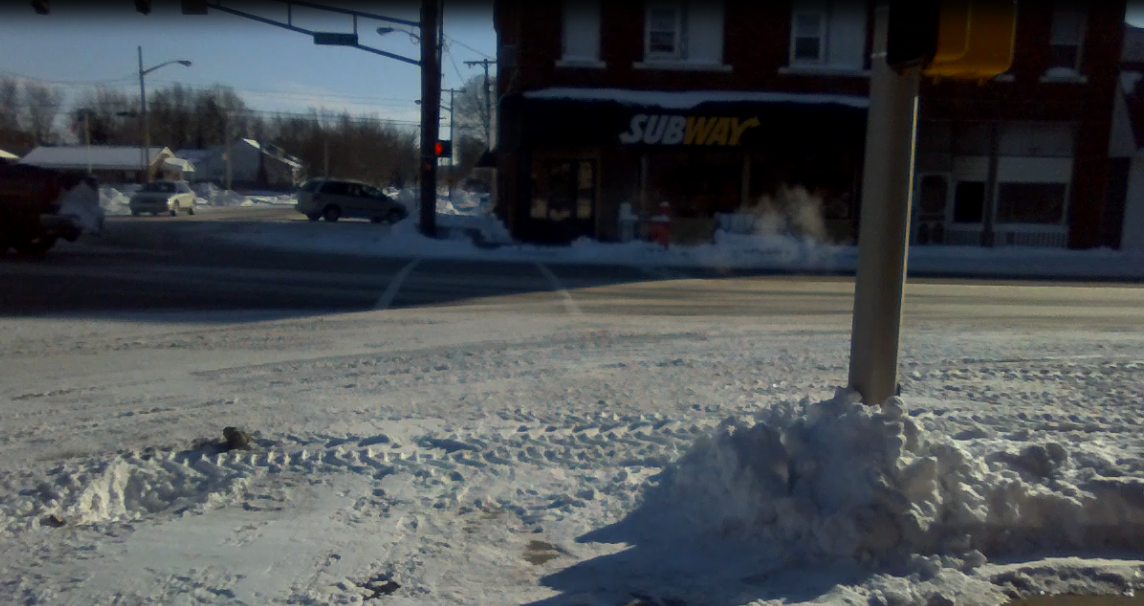
- Downtown Greentown in the winter. Showing the light, and the corner which Subway sits.

- Seal

- Location of Greentown in Howard County, Indiana.
- Coordinates: 40°28′39″N 85°57′45″W
- Country: United States
- State: Indiana
- County: Howard
- Township: Liberty
- Established: 1873

Area
  - Total: 1.29 sq mi (3.35 km^{2})
  - Land: 1.29 sq mi (3.35 km^{2})
  - Water: 0 sq mi (0.00 km^{2})
- Elevation: 843 ft (257 m)

Population (2020)
  - Total: 2,370
  - Density: 1,831/sq mi (706.9/km^{2})
- Time zone: UTC-5 (EST)
  - Summer (DST): UTC-5 (EST)
- ZIP code: 46936
- Area code: 765
- FIPS code: 18-29772
- GNIS feature ID: 2396976
- Website: townofgreentown.com

Greentown is a town in Liberty Township, Howard County, Indiana, United States. Located approximately 9 miles (14 km) east of Kokomo on State Road 22 / US 35; it is home to the Howard County Fair Grounds. The town was platted in 1848, and incorporated as a town in 1873. Known for its collectible glassware made for only a few years by a local factory destroyed in 1903, it is home to the Greentown Glass Museum. As of the 2020 census, Greentown had a population of 2,370.

== Geography ==
According to the 2010 census, Greentown has a total area of 1.37 square miles (3.55 km^{2}), all land. It was the nearest town to the epicenter of the magnitude 3.8 Indiana earthquake of December 30, 2010.

== History ==
Greentown was laid out in 1848 on the site of a former Native American village. Its inception was largely due to the need for a nearby trading post by people living in the area. First was a merchant, L. W. Bacon, who built a log house on the northeast corner of Main and Merdian. Next was C. O. Fry, who built on the southwest corner of the intersection. Just prior to the establishment of these local stores, around 1840, the Miami tribe of the Algonquin native peoples had a population in Howard County of about two hundred. There was an established village where south Kokomo is now located, as well as villages south of present-day Cassville and Greentown. The frequently traveled paths were from Kokomo to Peru by way of the village of Cassville, and from Kokomo to Meshingomesia by way of a village south of Greentown.

There are several versions of how Greentown received its name. One of the more obvious versions is that Greentown was an area of luscious green grass. Another version deals with the fact that before the town was incorporated, that land was a part of a former township named Green Township. Green Township formed into both Liberty and Union Townships in 1860, and so even though Greentown wasn't incorporated until the 1870s people were still living there when it was Green Township, and may have possibly all opted to preserve Green Township in some way by naming their town after it. One other version is based on the idea of Greentown being an Indian settlement named after a Native American chief called Green.

Greentown was incorporated some time between 1870 and 1880 as it first appeared on the US census in 1880. The population started out at just over 200, and quickly reached a thousand. Over the years since, Greentown's population numbers have seen notable gains every couple censuses followed by smaller drops between, which has enabled the town to slowly grow over time. The population has remained at nearly 2,500 since the 1990s. Greentown is expected to annex more area when the sewage treatment plant is updated, bringing another gain.

The Hy-Red Gasoline Station was listed on the National Register of Historic Places in 1983.

In 2022, a large solar power plant was approved for development near Greentown. Some locals have contested this development, voicing concerns about noise and about the loss of farmland around a longtime farming community. Protesters have alleged that the county administrators and company representatives violated the law by holding illegal closed-door meetings, locking the public out of deliberations.

== Notable people ==
- James A. Evans (1827–1887), civil engineer
- Darlene Mitchell, drag queen
- Miriam Seegar, film actress
- Sara Seegar, film actress

== Glass industry ==
Greentown's first natural gas well came in 1877, and was located near the railroad on the west side of town. In years to come, D.C. Jenkins founded a glass manufacturing plant, Indiana Tumbler and Goblet Factory. The company was sold in 1899 to the National Glass Company. This company was fully operational until 1903 when a fire destroyed the building. The National Glass Company created glassware that is highly desirable today. The glass factory brought many jobs to the area and marked the town's main period of industrial activity. After the factory burned down and the natural gas supply drastically declined, Greentown's population dropped by about ten percent, and the town as a whole suffered severe loss of revenue. However, the town has since doubled in population from its industrial peak.

== Libraries ==
Greentown is home to two public libraries, one in the elementary building and the other in the local high school. The libraries host many events in the community to get Greentown residents involved and interested in reading.

== Transportation ==
=== Roads ===
Following the passage of a law that permitted the seizure of lands for the purpose of building public roads, in 1869 the citizens undertook the building of two toll roads: the Kokomo and Greentown Gravel Road, mostly on the south side of the Wildcat Creek and finished in 1874 (today's County Road 50 North), and the Kokomo-Greentown-Jerome Gravel Road on the north, finished in 1871 (today's Sycamore Road). These two roads joined on 50 North and 780 East and came together into Greentown. By the early 1900s the toll gates had been retired.

In modern times Main Street carries several highways; Meridian Street is the main north and south road. That is where historic downtown Greentown is centered, and the Howard County Fair is down Meridian Street just north of Greentown. The Elementary School is on Walnut Street, and Harrison Street is the location of Eastern Junior-Senior High School. The football stadium is at the corner of Walnut and Harrison Streets.

=== Rail ===
The interurban railroad entered Greentown in 1902 and served the area until 1930. It offered rail transportation to Kokomo, Greentown, and Marion in neighboring Grant County. While the interurban was running, many workers from Kokomo and Marion settled in Greentown for more rural living with urban jobs, and transformed Greentown into a suburban bedroom community and small business center. However, following the departure of the interurbanm Greentown has not again seen public transportation.

=== Highways ===
- US-35 to Logansport (north) and Muncie (south)
- IN-19 to Converse (north) and Tipton (south)
- IN-22 to Burlington and Kokomo (west) and Gas City and Hartford City (east)
- IN-213 from Greentown (north) to near Noblesville (south)

=== Walking trails ===
- Comet Trail – a trail that is a mile long, it is named after the local high school mascot.
- Historic Downtown Walking Trail – a trail that allows you to learn more about the area's history.

== Demographics ==
Historical population
Census	Pop.	Note	%±
1880	236		—
1890	731		209.7%
1900	1,287		76.1%
1910	1,156		−10.2%
1920	1,163		0.6%
1930	1,081		−7.1%
1940	1,080		−0.1%
1950	1,180		9.3%
1960	1,266		7.3%
1970	1,870		47.7%
1980	2,265		21.1%
1990	2,172		−4.1%
2000	2,546		17.2%
2010	2,415		−5.1%
2020	2,370		−1.9%
U.S. Decennial Census; 2013 Estimate

Greentown first appeared on the census in 1880. In 1870, the only three towns listed in Howard County were Kokomo, Russiaville, and New London. In 1880, New London vanished and Greentown was listed instead. Soon after Greentown's incorporation, its population rapidly grew to twice that of Russiaville's, and the population quickly rose to over a thousand people in just twenty years.

=== 2020 census ===
As of the 2020 census, Greentown had a population of 2,370. The median age was 42.5 years. 23.2% of residents were under the age of 18 and 21.0% of residents were 65 years of age or older. For every 100 females there were 86.3 males, and for every 100 females age 18 and over there were 82.5 males age 18 and over.

0.0% of residents lived in urban areas, while 100.0% lived in rural areas.

There were 995 households in Greentown, of which 27.6% had children under the age of 18 living in them. Of all households, 43.9% were married-couple households, 18.9% were households with a male householder and no spouse or partner present, and 33.7% were households with a female householder and no spouse or partner present. About 36.0% of all households were made up of individuals and 20.0% had someone living alone who was 65 years of age or older.

There were 1,108 housing units, of which 10.2% were vacant. The homeowner vacancy rate was 3.2% and the rental vacancy rate was 10.6%.

Racial composition as of the 2020 census
Race	Number	Percent
White	2,217	93.5%
Black or African American	11	0.5%
American Indian and Alaska Native	3	0.1%
Asian	9	0.4%
Native Hawaiian and Other Pacific Islander	0	0.0%
Some other race	13	0.5%
Two or more races	117	4.9%
Hispanic or Latino (of any race)	50	2.1%

=== 2010 census ===
As of the census of 2010, there were 2,415 people, 964 households, and 645 families residing in the town. The population density was 1,762.8 inhabitants per square mile (680.6/km^{2}). There were 1,069 housing units at an average density of 780.3 units per square mile (301.3 units/km^{2}). The racial makeup of the town was 97.1% White, 0.6% African American, 0.2% Native American, 1.0% Asian, 0.4% from other races, and 0.7% from two or more races. Hispanic or Latino of any race were 1.5% of the population.

There were 964 households, of which 34.4% had children under the age of 18 living with them, 49.5% were married couples living together, 14.3% had a female householder with no husband present, 3.1% had a male householder with no wife present, and 33.1% were non-families. 29.9% of all households were made up of individuals, and 14.1% had someone living alone who was 65 years of age or older. The average household size was 2.40 and the average family size was 2.97.

The median age in the town was 41.4 years. 25.1% of residents were under the age of 18; 7% were between the ages of 18 and 24; 22.5% were from 25 to 44; 25.3% were from 45 to 64; and 20.1% were 65 years of age or older. The gender makeup of the town was 46.0% male and 54.0% female.

=== 2000 census ===
As of the census of 2000, there were 2,546 people, 995 households, and 703 families residing in the town. The population density was 2,534.8 inhabitants per square mile (978.7/km^{2}). There were 1,050 housing units at an average density of 1,045.4 units per square mile (403.6 units/km^{2}). The racial makeup of the town was 97.92% White, 0.47% African American, 0.31% Native American, 0.31% Asian, 0.27% from other races, and 0.71% from two or more races. Hispanic or Latino of any race were 0.98% of the population.

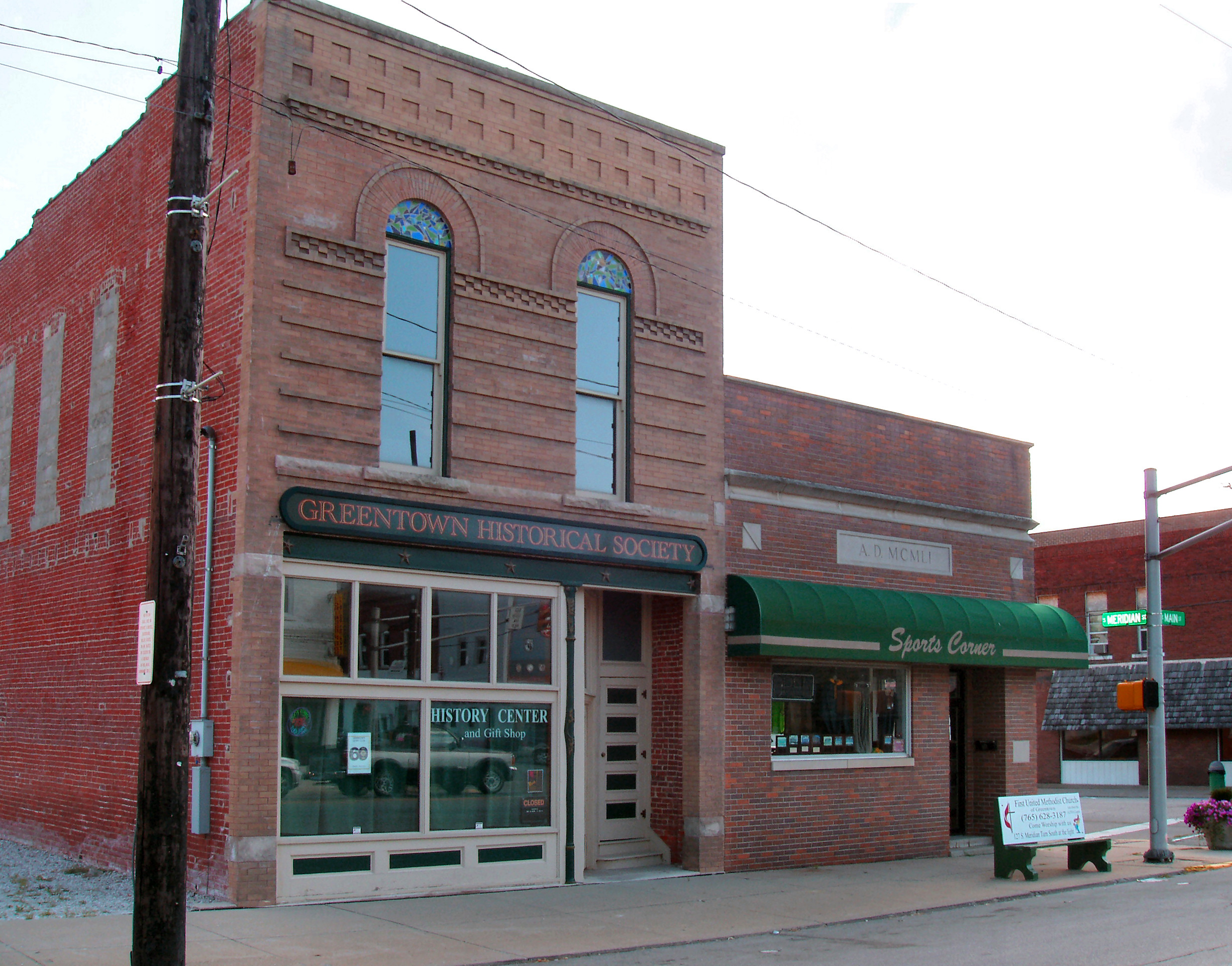
Greentown Historical Society, downtown Greentown.

There were 995 households, out of which 37.1% had children under the age of 18 living with them, 56.0% were married couples living together, 11.7% had a female householder with no husband present, and 29.3% were non-families. 27.5% of all households were made up of individuals, and 14.0% had someone living alone who was 65 years of age or older. The average household size was 2.49 and the average family size was 3.02.

In the town, the population was spread out, with 28.1% under the age of 18, 6.7% from 18 to 24, 27.8% from 25 to 44, 21.1% from 45 to 64, and 16.2% who were 65 years of age or older. The median age was 37 years. For every 100 females, there were 85.6 males. For every 100 females age 18 and over, there were 80.6 males.

The median income for a household in the town was $43,750, and the median income for a family was $52,310. Males had a median income of $42,132 versus $27,000 for females. The per capita income for the town was $20,057. About 6.5% of families and 9.2% of the population were below the poverty line, including 12.4% of those under age 18 and 3.2% of those age 65 or over.

== Education ==
=== School district ===
- Eastern Howard School Corporation (K-12)

Eastern High School competes in the Hoosier Heartland Conference (HHC) for athletics. Eastern's colors are green and gold. Eastern High School is home of the Mighty Comets.

== Local media ==
Newspapers

- Greentown Grapevine, monthly newspaper 1994–2013
