= Bunker Hill, Indiana =

- Town
- Seal

- Location in Miami County, Indiana
- Coordinates: 40°39′36″N 86°06′05″W
- Country: United States
- State: Indiana
- County: Miami
- Township: Pipe Creek
- Founded: 1851
- Founder: James Myers, John Duckwall and Alexander Galbraith

Area
  - Total: 0.39 sq mi (1.01 km^{2})
  - Land: 0.39 sq mi (1.01 km^{2})
  - Water: 0 sq mi (0.00 km^{2})
- Elevation: 817 ft (249 m)

Population (2020)
  - Total: 814
  - Density: 2,093.9/sq mi (808.46/km^{2})
- Time zone: UTC-5 (Eastern (EST))
  - Summer (DST): UTC-5 (EST)
- ZIP code: 46914
- Area code: 765
- FIPS code: 18-09136
- GNIS feature ID: 2396616
- Website: www.townofbunkerhillin.com

Bunker Hill is a town in Pipe Creek Township, Miami County, in the U.S. state of Indiana. The population was 814 at the 2020 census, down from 888 in 2010.

== History ==
Bunker Hill was platted in 1851 by James Myers, John Duckwall and Alexander Galbraith.

A post office opened in 1859. The Pan Handle Railroad came to Bunker Hill in 1868.

== Geography ==
Bunker Hill is located in southern Miami County. Indiana State Road 218 passes through the center of town, leading west 1 mile (1.6 km) to U.S. Route 31 and east 7 miles (11 km) to State Road 19 at Santa Fe. Grissom Air Reserve Base is one mile west of Bunker Hill, across U.S. 31. Peru, the Miami county seat, is 8 miles (13 km) north of Bunker Hill.

According to the U.S. Census Bureau, Bunker Hill has an area of 0.39 square miles (1.01 km^{2}), all land. Pipe Creek, a northwest-flowing tributary of the Wabash River, runs along the northern border of the town.

== Demographics ==
Historical population
Census	Pop.	Note	%±
1880	596		—
1890	538		−9.7%
1900	568		5.6%
1910	668		17.6%
1920	550		−17.7%
1930	528		−4.0%
1940	561		6.3%
1950	659		17.5%
1960	1,049		59.2%
1970	956		−8.9%
1980	984		2.9%
1990	1,010		2.6%
2000	987		−2.3%
2010	888		−10.0%
2020	814		−8.3%
U.S. Decennial Census

=== 2010 census ===
As of the census of 2010, there were 888 people, 366 households, and 249 families living in the town. The population density was 2,114.3 inhabitants per square mile (816.3/km^{2}). There were 445 housing units at an average density of 1,059.5 per square mile (409.1/km^{2}). The racial makeup of the town was 93.7% White, 1.6% African American, 0.8% Native American, 0.8% Asian, 0.7% from other races, and 2.5% from two or more races. Hispanic or Latino of any race were 2.0% of the population.

There were 366 households, of which 37.2% had children under the age of 18 living with them, 46.4% were married couples living together, 15.3% had a female householder with no husband present, 6.3% had a male householder with no wife present, and 32.0% were non-families. 26.0% of all households were made up of individuals, and 10.1% had someone living alone who was 65 years of age or older. The average household size was 2.43 and the average family size was 2.87.

The median age in the town was 37.4 years. 25.7% of residents were under the age of 18; 10.8% were between the ages of 18 and 24; 23.9% were from 25 to 44; 25.3% were from 45 to 64; and 14.3% were 65 years of age or older. The gender makeup of the town was 48.3% male and 51.7% female.

=== 2000 census ===
As of the census of 2000, there were 987 people, 397 households, and 277 families living in the town. The population density was 2,262.6 inhabitants per square mile (873.6/km^{2}). There were 423 housing units at an average density of 969.7 per square mile (374.4/km^{2}). The racial makeup of the town was 94.93% White, 1.32% African American, 0.51% Native American, 0.61% Asian, 0.10% from other races, and 2.53% from two or more races. Hispanic or Latino of any race were 1.11% of the population.

There were 397 households, out of which 36.3% had children under the age of 18 living with them, 54.9% were married couples living together, 11.3% had a female householder with no husband present, and 30.0% were non-families. 27.0% of all households were made up of individuals, and 9.6% had someone living alone who was 65 years of age or older. The average household size was 2.49 and the average family size was 3.02.

In the town, the population was spread out, with 29.1% under the age of 18, 8.4% from 18 to 24, 28.2% from 25 to 44, 22.6% from 45 to 64, and 11.8% who were 65 years of age or older. The median age was 34 years. For every 100 females, there were 94.3 males. For every 100 females age 18 and over, there were 90.7 males.

The median income for a household in the town was $36,154, and the median income for a family was $44,861. Males had a median income of $34,722 versus $22,625 for females. The per capita income for the town was $17,000. About 3.3% of families and 7.1% of the population were below the poverty line, including 6.7% of those under age 18 and 8.5% of those age 65 or over.

== Education ==
=== School Districts ===
- Maconaquah School Corporation (K-12)

Maconaquah High School competes in the Three Rivers Conference (TRC) for athletics.

== Notable people ==
- Tod Sloan, jockey; born in Bunker Hill
- Tavis Smiley, talk show host; grew up in Bunker Hill
