= Denver, Indiana =

- Town
- Location in Miami County, Indiana
- Coordinates: 40°51′53″N 86°04′38″W
- Country: United States
- State: Indiana
- County: Miami
- Township: Jefferson

Area
  - Total: 0.24 sq mi (0.62 km^{2})
  - Land: 0.24 sq mi (0.62 km^{2})
  - Water: 0 sq mi (0.00 km^{2})
- Elevation: 702 ft (214 m)

Population (2020)
  - Total: 478
  - Density: 1,992.4/sq mi (769.26/km^{2})
- Time zone: UTC-5 (Eastern (EST))
  - Summer (DST): UTC-5 (EST)
- ZIP code: 46926
- Area code: 765
- FIPS code: 18-17776
- GNIS feature ID: 2396685

Denver is a town in Jefferson Township, Miami County, in the U.S. state of Indiana. The population was 478 at the 2020 census.

Denver is served by North Miami Schools.

== History ==
Denver was laid out in 1872 when the Eel River Railroad was extended to that point. The town was named after Denver, Colorado. The post office at Denver has been in operation since 1869.

== Geography ==
Denver is located in northern Miami County. Indiana State Road 16 passes through the town as Harrison Street, leading east 3 miles (5 km) to Chili and west 8 miles (13 km) to Twelve Mile. Peru, the Miami county seat, is 9 miles (14 km) to the south.

According to the U.S. Census Bureau, Denver has a total area of 0.24 square miles (0.62 km^{2}), all land. The Eel River passes just south of the town, and Weesau Creek, a tributary, touches the western boundary of the town in two places. The Eel River flows southwest to the Wabash River at Logansport.

== Demographics ==
Historical population
Census	Pop.	Note	%±
1880	273		—
1920	522		—
1930	472		−9.6%
1940	483		2.3%
1950	528		9.3%
1960	565		7.0%
1970	566		0.2%
1980	589		4.1%
1990	504		−14.4%
2000	541		7.3%
2010	482		−10.9%
2020	478		−0.8%
U.S. Decennial Census

=== 2010 census ===
As of the census of 2010, there were 482 people, 177 households, and 133 families living in the town. The population density was 2,095.7 inhabitants per square mile (809.2/km^{2}). There were 194 housing units at an average density of 843.5 per square mile (325.7/km^{2}). The racial makeup of the town was 98.8% White, 0.2% African American, 0.6% Native American, and 0.4% from two or more races. Hispanic or Latino of any race were 1.2% of the population.

There were 177 households, of which 41.2% had children under the age of 18 living with them, 57.1% were married couples living together, 11.9% had a female householder with no husband present, 6.2% had a male householder with no wife present, and 24.9% were non-families. 20.3% of all households were made up of individuals, and 11.3% had someone living alone who was 65 years of age or older. The average household size was 2.72 and the average family size was 3.13.

The median age in the town was 37.6 years. 29.3% of residents were under the age of 18; 5.3% were between the ages of 18 and 24; 27.4% were from 25 to 44; 25.3% were from 45 to 64; and 12.7% were 65 years of age or older. The gender makeup of the town was 48.5% male and 51.5% female.

=== 2000 census ===
As of the census of 2000, there were 541 people, 189 households, and 158 families living in the town. The population density was 2,318.0 inhabitants per square mile (895.0/km^{2}). There were 200 housing units at an average density of 856.9 per square mile (330.9/km^{2}). The racial makeup of the town was 98.89% White, 0.55% Native American, and 0.55% from two or more races. Hispanic or Latino of any race were 0.37% of the population.

There were 189 households, out of which 48.7% had children under the age of 18 living with them, 64.0% were married couples living together, 16.9% had a female householder with no husband present, and 15.9% were non-families. 13.8% of all households were made up of individuals, and 6.3% had someone living alone who was 65 years of age or older. The average household size was 2.86 and the average family size was 3.11.

In the town, the population was spread out, with 30.9% under the age of 18, 6.8% from 18 to 24, 34.2% from 25 to 44, 18.5% from 45 to 64, and 9.6% who were 65 years of age or older. The median age was 33 years. For every 100 females, there were 104.2 males. For every 100 females age 18 and over, there were 88.9 males.

The median income for a household in the town was $36,250, and the median income for a family was $36,985. Males had a median income of $29,286 versus $21,250 for females. The per capita income for the town was $15,224. About 5.0% of families and 9.5% of the population were below the poverty line, including 14.8% of those under age 18 and 4.9% of those age 65 or over.
