= Central Railroad of Indianapolis =

Freight railroad in Indiana, United States

Overview
- Parent company: Genesee & Wyoming
- Headquarters: Indianapolis, Indiana
- Reporting mark: CERA
- Locale: Indiana
- Dates of operation: 1989–present

Technical
- Track gauge: 4 ft 8 1/2 in (1,435 mm) standard gauge
- Length: 58 miles (93 km)

Other
- Website: https://www.gwrr.com/cera/

The Central Railroad of Indianapolis (reporting mark CERA) is a Class III short-line railroad that operates approximately 58 miles (93 km) miles of track in north central Indiana, connecting Marion, Indiana with Hartford City, Amboy, and Kokomo, Indiana. CERA interchanges with Norfolk Southern in Marion, and with Toledo, Peoria & Western in Kokomo.

The line is owned and operated by Genesee & Wyoming. The CERA and its sister railroad, the Central Railroad of Indiana, were acquired by RailTex's Indiana & Ohio Railway in 1998, which became a RailAmerica holding in 2000; Genesee & Wyoming acquired RailAmerica in 2012.

CERA was formed in 1989 when Norfolk Southern leased 24 miles of its former Nickel Plate Road "Clover Leaf Route" between Kokomo and Marion, through NS's "Thoroughbred Shortline program.

The railroad's main traffic comes from grain and metal products. The CERA hauled around 8,000 carloads in 2008, and can handle freight cars weighing up to 286,000 pounds (143 short tons/129.7 tonnes).

== History ==
For a time, Norfolk Southern interchanged with CERA via its Frankfort to Kokomo line. The latter route was embargoed after the Norfolk Southern Conrail merger allowed Norfolk Southern to move CERA interchange to Marion.

== Route Description ==
One leg of the railroad begins near Marion at the unincorporated town of Michaelsville, passes west-southwest through Herbst, Swayzee and Sims, then through the Howard County communities of Sycamore, Greentown, and finally Kokomo.
