= Richland Township, Grant County, Indiana =

Richland Township
- Township
- Location of Richland Township in Grant County
- Coordinates: 40°36′09″N 85°49′08″W
- Country: United States
- State: Indiana
- County: Grant

Government
  - Type: Indiana township

Area
  - Total: 23.75 sq mi (61.5 km^{2})
  - Land: 23.75 sq mi (61.5 km^{2})
  - Water: 0 sq mi (0 km^{2}) 0%
- Elevation: 830 ft (253 m)

Population (2020)
  - Total: 887
  - Density: 40.7/sq mi (15.7/km^{2})
- GNIS feature ID: 0453793

Richland Township is one of 13 townships in Grant County, Indiana, United States. As of the 2010 census, its population was 966 and it contained 431 housing units.

== Geography ==
According to the 2010 census, the township has a total area of 23.75 square miles (61.5 km^{2}), all land. The stream of Taylor Creek runs through this township.

=== Cities and towns ===
- Converse (east quarter)
- Sweetser (west edge)

=== Unincorporated towns ===
- Mier

(This list is based on USGS data and may include former settlements.)

=== Adjacent townships ===
- Liberty Township, Wabash County (northeast)
- Pleasant Township (east)
- Franklin Township (southeast)
- Sims Township (south)
- Jackson Township, Howard County (southwest)
- Jackson Township, Miami County (west)
- Waltz Township, Wabash County (northwest)

=== Cemeteries ===
The township contains several cemeteries, one active, the Independent Order of Odd Fellows. It also contains the Pence and the Drook cemeteries, both on private land. William Robert Taylor for whom Taylor Creek in named, is likely buried in the Drook Cemetery. His wife Mary was the first burial in the Pence cemetery.

=== Major highways ===
- SR 13
- SR 18

== Education ==
Richland Township residents may obtain a free library card from the Converse-Jackson Township Public Library in Converse.
