= Mier, Indiana =

- Census-designated place
- Location of Mier in Grant County, Indiana.

- Location within Indiana Location within the United States
- Coordinates: 40°34′29″N 85°49′24″W
- Country: United States
- State: Indiana
- County: Grant
- Township: Richland

Area
  - Total: 0.24 sq mi (0.62 km^{2})
  - Land: 0.24 sq mi (0.62 km^{2})
  - Water: 0 sq mi (0.00 km^{2})
- Elevation: 833 ft (254 m)

Population (2020)
  - Total: 67
  - Density: 280.0/sq mi (108.12/km^{2})
- ZIP code: 46919
- Area code: 765
- FIPS code: 18-49212
- GNIS feature ID: 2583459

Mier is an unincorporated community and census-designated place (CDP) in Richland Township, Grant County, Indiana, in the United States. As of the 2020 census, Mier had a population of 67.

== History ==
The community was named after Ciudad Mier, in Mexico. A post office was established at Mier in 1849, and remained in operation until it was discontinued in 1928.

== Geography ==
Mier is located in northwestern Grant County, crossed by State Roads 13, 18, and 19. State Road 18 leads east 3 miles (5 km) to Sweetser and west 2.5 miles (4.0 km) to Converse, while State Road 13 leads north 6.5 miles (10.5 km) to Somerset and south 4.5 miles (7.2 km) to Swayzee. State Road 19 follows State Road 13 south from Mier and State Road 18 west from it. Marion, the Grant County seat, is 9 miles (14 km) to the east via State Road 18.

According to the U.S. Census Bureau, the Mier CDP has an area of 0.23 square miles (0.6 km^{2}), all of it land.

== Demographics ==
Historical population
Census	Pop.	Note	%±
2020	67		—
U.S. Decennial Census
