= Jackson Township, Howard County, Indiana =

Jackson Township
- Township
- Location in Howard County
- Coordinates: 40°31′26″N 85°54′29″W
- Country: United States
- State: Indiana
- County: Howard

Government
  - Type: Indiana township

Area
  - Total: 23.5 sq mi (61 km^{2})
  - Land: 23.49 sq mi (60.8 km^{2})
  - Water: 0 sq mi (0 km^{2}) 0%
- Elevation: 843 ft (257 m)

Population (2020)
  - Total: 605
  - Density: 25.4/sq mi (9.8/km^{2})
- GNIS feature ID: 0453449

Jackson Township is one of eleven townships in Howard County, Indiana, United States. As of the 2020 census, its population was 605, up from 596 in 2010.

Historical population
Census	Pop.	Note	%±
2000	575		—
2010	596		3.7%
2020	605		1.5%
U.S. Census

== History ==
Jackson Township was organized in 1853. It was named for President Andrew Jackson.

== Geography ==
According to the 2010 census, the township has a total area of 23.5 square miles (61 km^{2}), all land.

=== Unincorporated towns ===
- Sycamore

=== Former Settlements ===
- West Sims (just west of Sims in Grant County)

=== Adjacent townships ===
- Jackson Township, Miami County (north)
- Richland Township, Grant County (northeast)
- Sims Township, Grant County (east)
- Green Township, Grant County (southeast)
- Union Township (south)
- Liberty Township (west)
- Harrison Township, Miami County (northwest)

=== Major highways ===
- US 35
- SR 19
- SR 22
