= Flox =

Flox may refer to:

- FLOX, in chemistry, a combustion process said to reduce nitrogen oxide formation by suppressing peak flame temperatures
- Floxing, in biology, a term describing the sandwiching of a DNA sequence between two lox P sites

== See also ==
- C-Flox, abrev. for Ciprofloxacin
- O-Flox, abrev. for Ofloxacin
- FLOX, abrev. for chemotherapy protocol used in the USA (FOLFLOX in EU), containing Fluorouracil, Leucovorin, Oxaliplatin
- Fl-Ox, a fluorine, liquid oxygen mixture (also written as FLOX), an experimental oxidizer for rocketry
- Floxx, digital media company
- Phlox (disambiguation)
