= West Liberty, Indiana =

West Liberty, Indiana, may refer to:

- West Liberty, Howard County, Indiana
- West Liberty, Jay County, Indiana
