= Sims Township, Grant County, Indiana =

Sims Township
- Township
- Location of Sims Township in Grant County
- Coordinates: 40°31′09″N 85°49′42″W
- Country: United States
- State: Indiana
- County: Grant

Government
  - Type: Indiana township

Area
  - Total: 24.08 sq mi (62.4 km^{2})
  - Land: 24.08 sq mi (62.4 km^{2})
  - Water: 0 sq mi (0 km^{2}) 0%
- Elevation: 860 ft (262 m)

Population (2020)
  - Total: 1,692
  - Density: 73.9/sq mi (28.5/km^{2})
- GNIS feature ID: 0453849

Sims Township is one of 13 townships in Grant County, Indiana, United States. As of the 2010 census, its population was 1,779 and it contained 757 housing units.

== Geography ==
According to the 2010 census, the township has a total area of 24.08 square miles (62.4 km^{2}), all land. The streams of Taylor Creek and Stoney Creek run through this township.

=== Cities and towns ===
- Swayzee

=== Unincorporated towns ===
- Sims

(This list is based on USGS data and may include former settlements.)

=== Adjacent townships ===
- Richland Township (north)
- Pleasant Township (northeast)
- Franklin Township (east)
- Liberty Township (southeast)
- Green Township (south)
- Union Township, Howard County (southwest)
- Jackson Township, Howard County (west)
- Jackson Township, Miami County (northwest)

=== Cemeteries ===
The township contains two cemeteries: Alel and Thraikill.

=== Major highways ===
- US 35
- SR 13
