= Battle of Oryahovo =

Battle of Oryahovo (Rahova)
- Part of Romanian War of Independence (Russo-Turkish War of 1877–1878)
- Taking of Rahova by the Romanians (Illustrirte Zeitung, December 1878)
Date	19–21 November 1877
Location	Rahova (present-day Oryahovo, Bulgaria)
Result	Romanian–Russian victory
Territorial changes	Capture of Rahova by Romanian–Russian forces

Belligerents
Romania; Russian Empire; Bulgarian Volunteers	Ottoman Empire

Commanders and leaders
(Romania) Colonel Gheorghe Slăniceanu (Russian Empire) Major General Feofil Egorovich Meyendorf	(Ottoman Empire) Miralai of Rahova

Units involved
1st Battalion, 4th "Argeș" Dorobanți Regiment; Muscel Battalion; 1st Mehedinți Battalion	Rahova garrison

Strength
~5,600 total: • ~5,000 Romanians • ~600 Russians • 22 artillery guns	~3,000 Ottoman troops • 4 Krupp artillery pieces • 1 river monitor (Podgorița)

The Battle of Oryahovo (also known as the Battle of Rahova) took place between 19 and 21 November 1877 and was one of the principal engagements of the Romanian War of Independence. The conflict involved allied Romanian and Russian forces acting to subdue the Ottoman garrison stationed at the fortress town of Rahova (present-day Oryahovo, Bulgaria).

== Background ==
During the allied campaign to capture Plevna, the overall war effort was threatened by a significant concentration of Ottoman forces stationed at Rahova. Concerned that this force could logistically support Osman Pasha's defense of Plevna, Grand Duke Nicholas Nikolaevich of Russia and Prince Carol I of Romania decided to occupy Rahova.

Reconnaissance missions conducted by Russian General Nikolai Krylov indicated that the Rahova stronghold was protected by three redoubts, defended by approximately 3,000 Ottoman troops, and equipped with four Krupp artillery pieces. To capture the position, an allied detachment was formed consisting of approximately 5,000 Romanian soldiers—primarily dorobanți—under the command of Colonel George Slăniceanu, alongside roughly 600 Russian troops under Major General Mayendorff.

== Prelude and preliminary operations ==
=== Capture of the Southern Defense ===
On 29 October 1877, a Romanian force commanded by Major Constantin Ene secured a tactical victory by capturing the "Vidin" redoubt, which defended Rahova from the south. Using a combined assault of cavalry, infantry, and artillery, Major Ene cleared the southern approach to Rahova.

=== Neutralization of the Ottoman Monitor Podgorița ===
The allied plan relied on logistical support from Romanian artillery batteries located across the Danube at Bechet, which facilitated the movement of Romanian dorobanți to the front line. However, operations were threatened by the Ottoman river monitor Podgorița, anchored behind the Ciftele islets.

Major Maican Dumitrescu, a river flotilla specialist trained at Brest, snuck onto one of the Ciftele islets under cover of darkness to establish the exact location of the Podgorița. He telegraphed the coordinates to the artillery at Bechet, enabling Romanian gunners to shell and sink the Ottoman warship.

Following these successful preparations, Colonel Slăniceanu's force reached Selanovcea (Selanovtsi, 6 km from Rahova) on the eve of the primary engagement, joined by detachments under Colonel Crețeanu and Major General Mayendorff.

== Course of the Battle ==
=== Initial assault (19 November) ===
The allied force deployed with infantry in the center, cavalry on the flanks, and an artillery line of 22 guns positioned in the rear. The offensive opened with an attack on one of the secondary redoubts led by Major Dimitrie Giurescu (1st Battalion, 4th "Argeș" Dorobanți Regiment) and the Muscel Battalion, backed by continuous artillery bombardment under Colonel Slăniceanu.

After more than an hour of fighting, Second Lieutenant Spiroiu raised the Romanian flag over the parapet of the secondary redoubt. The Muscel Battalion then spearheaded the attack against the main redoubt. During the assault, Major Dimitrie Giurescu was killed in action. Despite his death, the assault severely compromised Rahova's defense network and allowed Romanian forces to establish distant fire control over the main redoubt by nightfall.

=== Ottoman retreat and final engagement (20–21 November) ===
On the following day, allied forces conducted reconnaissance and evaluated the deteriorating condition of the Ottoman defenders. On the night of 20–21 November, the Ottoman commander (miralay) ordered an evacuation of the redoubts under the cover of artillery fire, directing approximately 2,000 soldiers to retreat toward the Ogosta River.

To cover the withdrawal, the Ottoman command staged a diversionary attack near the Hârleț bridge. However, the retreating Ottoman column was ambushed by the 1st Mehedinți Battalion under Captain Constantin Merișescu and forced to re-engage. Reinforcements under Major General Mayendorff and logistical maneuvers managed by Colonel Crețulescu fully disrupted the Ottoman escape route. By the morning of 21 November 1877, the battle concluded with the complete capture of Rahova and a Romanian victory.

== Legacy ==
In a letter to Prince Carol I of Romania, Grand Duke Nicholas Nikolaevich told the Romanian prince that "the victory at Oryahovo belongs entirely to the Romanian Army".

Today, the Rahova neighbourhood of Bucharest is named after the battle.
