= Amboy, Indiana =

- Town
- Location in Miami County, Indiana
- Coordinates: 40°36′06″N 85°55′38″W
- Country: United States
- State: Indiana
- County: Miami
- Township: Jackson
- Platted: 1867

Area
  - Total: 0.34 sq mi (0.87 km^{2})
  - Land: 0.34 sq mi (0.87 km^{2})
  - Water: 0 sq mi (0.00 km^{2})
- Elevation: 817 ft (249 m)

Population (2020)
  - Total: 317
  - Density: 943.4/sq mi (364.23/km^{2})
- Time zone: UTC-5 (Eastern (EST))
  - Summer (DST): UTC-5 (EST)
- ZIP code: 46911
- Area code: 765
- FIPS code: 18-01360
- GNIS ID: 2397428

Amboy is a town in Jackson Township, Miami County, Indiana, United States. The population was 317 at the 2020 census, down from 384 in 2010.

== History ==
Amboy was platted in 1867, when the Pan Handle Railroad was extended to that point. A post office has been in operation at Amboy since 1868.

== Geography ==
Amboy is located in southeastern Miami County. Indiana State Road 19 passes through the town as its Main Street, leading northwest 14 miles (23 km) to Peru, the county seat, and southeast 4 miles (6 km) to Converse.

According to the U.S. Census Bureau, Amboy has a total area of 0.34 square miles (0.88 km^{2}), all of it recorded as land. Honey Creek passes through the northwest side of the town, flowing north to Pipe Creek, which runs northwest to the Wabash River at Lewisburg.

== Demographics ==
Historical population
Census	Pop.	Note	%±
1880	208		—
1890	402		93.3%
1900	402		0.0%
1910	521		29.6%
1920	460		−11.7%
1930	431		−6.3%
1940	450		4.4%
1950	414		−8.0%
1960	446		7.7%
1970	473		6.1%
1980	450		−4.9%
1990	370		−17.8%
2000	360		−2.7%
2010	384		6.7%
2020	317		−17.4%
U.S. Decennial Census

=== 2010 census ===
As of the 2010 census, there were 384 people, 151 households, and 114 families living in the town. The population density was 1,097.1 inhabitants per square mile (423.6/km^{2}). There were 169 housing units at an average density of 482.9 per square mile (186.4/km^{2}). The racial makeup of the town was 96.6% White, 0.5% African American, 1.0% Asian, 1.0% from other races, and 0.8% from two or more races. Hispanic or Latino of any race were 0.8% of the population.

There were 151 households, of which 26.5% had children under the age of 18 living with them, 60.3% were married couples living together, 11.3% had a female householder with no husband present, 4.0% had a male householder with no wife present, and 24.5% were non-families. 21.9% of all households were made up of individuals, and 10% had someone living alone who was 65 years of age or older. The average household size was 2.54 and the average family size was 2.96.

The median age in the town was 40.5 years. 23.4% of residents were under the age of 18; 8.3% were between the ages of 18 and 24; 24% were from 25 to 44; 24.8% were from 45 to 64; and 19.5% were 65 years of age or older. The gender makeup of the town was 48.4% male and 51.6% female.

=== 2000 census ===
As of the 2000 census, there were 360 people, 147 households, and 113 families living in the town. The population density was 1,017.8 inhabitants per square mile (393.0/km^{2}). There were 158 housing units at an average density of 446.7 per square mile (172.5/km^{2}). The racial makeup of the town was 98.06% White, 0.28% Asian, 1.39% from other races, and 0.28% from two or more races. Hispanic or Latino of any race were 1.11% of the population.

There were 147 households, out of which 27.2% had children under the age of 18 living with them, 70.7% were married couples living together, 4.8% had a female householder with no husband present, and 23.1% were non-families. 20.4% of all households were made up of individuals, and 10.9% had someone living alone who was 65 years of age or older. The average household size was 2.45 and the average family size was 2.81.

In the town, the population was spread out, with 21.9% under the age of 18, 5.3% from 18 to 24, 26.9% from 25 to 44, 25.8% from 45 to 64, and 20.0% who were 65 years of age or older. The median age was 42 years. For every 100 females, there were 85.6 males. For every 100 females age 18 and over, there were 87.3 males.

The median income for a household in the town was $41,397, and the median income for a family was $45,000. Males had a median income of $40,500 versus $21,094 for females. The per capita income for the town was $19,503. About 4.2% of families and 7.1% of the population were below the poverty line, including 7.8% of those under age 18 and 11.7% of those age 65 or over.

== Education ==
Amboy residents are served by the Converse-Jackson Township Public Library in Converse.
