= Phlox (disambiguation) =

Phlox is a genus of flowering plants.

The term may also refer to:

- USS Phlox (1864), a Union gunboat during the American Civil War
- Phlox (Star Trek), a fictional character
- Phlox, Indiana, an unincorporated place in the United States
- Phlox, Wisconsin, an unincorporated place in the United States

== See also ==
- Flox (disambiguation)
