= Sweetser, Indiana =

- Town
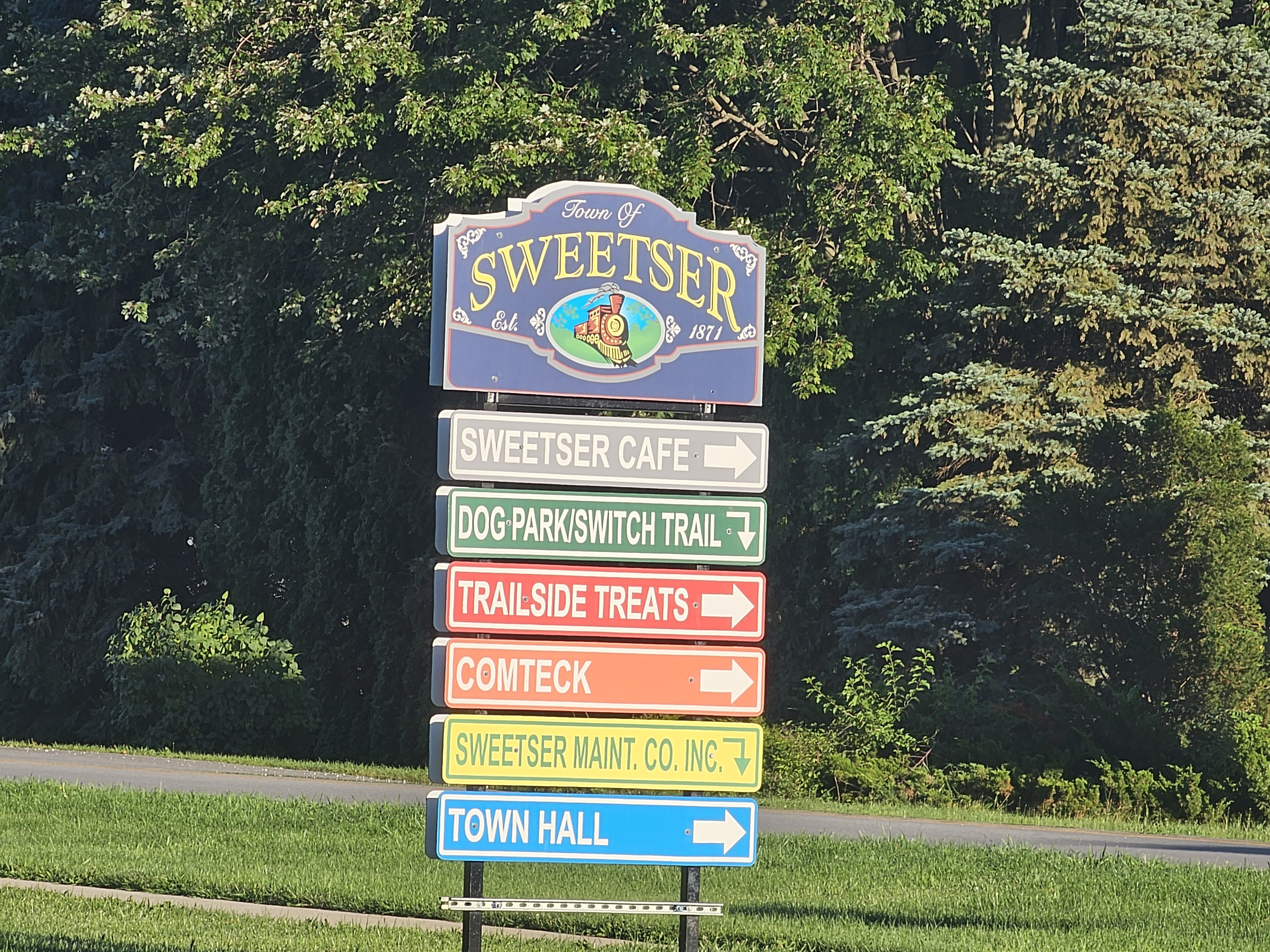
- Welcome to Sweetser, Indiana.

- Logo

- Location of Sweetser in Grant County, Indiana.
- Coordinates: 40°34′07″N 85°45′30″W
- Country: United States
- State: Indiana
- County: Grant
- Townships: Franklin, Pleasant and Richland

Area
  - Total: 1.01 sq mi (2.62 km^{2})
  - Land: 1.01 sq mi (2.61 km^{2})
  - Water: 0.0039 sq mi (0.01 km^{2})
- Elevation: 846 ft (258 m)

Population (2020)
  - Total: 1,075
  - Density: 1,066.2/sq mi (411.67/km^{2})
- Time zone: UTC-5 (Eastern (EST))
  - Summer (DST): UTC-4 (EDT)
- ZIP code: 46987
- Area code: 765
- FIPS code: 18-74546
- GNIS feature ID: 2397691
- Website: sweetserin.us

Sweetser is a town in Franklin, Pleasant and Richland townships, Grant County, Indiana, United States. As of the 2020 census, Sweetser had a population of 1,075.

== History ==
The Pittsburgh, Cincinnati, Chicago and St. Louis Railroad was built through the area in 1867. Around 1869, a half-mile long switch was built to haul wood to a train refueling station. This switch would become the nucleus of the town. Railroadmen began calling it "Switch" and soon thereafter, the area was known as "Switzer" and then "Sweetser".

The original plat of town of Sweetser was entered on October 14, 1871, by Sanford Prater, John Hubert, James H. Vinson, Urich Mars and H.B. Bragg with the Grant County Recorder's office. The land which formed the original plat of Sweetser had been entered in the District Land Office in Fort Wayne, Indiana on May 22, 1848, by Samuel Blinn.

Additional plats to the town were Nuzum's in 1873, and the Wilcut's, McGee's, Bishop's and Nuzum's 2nd, all platted in 1874.

The early business section was north of the railroad on the west side of Main Street. A sawmill was located at what is now the site of the Methodist church (413 N. Main). Sweetser had several dry goods stores, a blacksmith shop, a jeweler and a saloon.

As the population grew, the sawmill was torn down and a new schoolhouse was built where it once stood. The old schoolhouse by the railroad (104 N. Meridian) was replaced by a grain elevator built by Gilbert and William Baum.

When natural gas was struck around Sweetser in 1885, the town was ready for development. The Brickner Window Glass Company, established in 1893, attracted many people not only living nearby but from other states to come to work and live here. The glass factory was located on the west side of town, being situated just west of what is now 319 W. Hubert Street. The factory was also known as Schick & Hawkins Window Glass Company.

From 1884 to 1894 there were five additions platted to Sweetser, namely Thompson's, Sherron's, Sherron's 2nd, Sherron's 3rd and Hawkins.

A hotel, known as the Vardaman Hotel, was located at 103 Main Street in lots number 27-29 of the original plat. This hotel was built to accommodate the number of persons working at the glass factory.

The Friermood Tile Factory was started in 1888 and was located at the end of Walnut Street. It made tile for draining the lands around Sweetser into Pipe Creek.

== Geography ==
Sweetser is located on State Road 18 between the town of Converse and the city of Marion. According to the 2010 census, Sweetser has a total area of 1.013 square miles (2.62 km^{2}), of which 1.01 square miles (2.62 km^{2}) (or 99.7%) is land and 0.003 square miles (0.01 km^{2}) (or 0.3%) is water.

Running through the edge of Sweetser is a small body of water, or creek, known as Pipe Creek. Pipe Creek is one of the sites that can be seen from the Sweetser Switch Trail. Known as one of Sweetser's main attractions, the trail is a walking trail that stretches throughout the whole town and is expanded three miles outside of the town's outer limits. Although this trail is intended for walking, there are signs posted that allow bicyclists, cross country skiers, runners, wheelchairs and various other ways of exercise permitted on the trail. A new addition to the trail is a statue of one of Grant County's celebrities, Garfield.

== Demographics ==
Historical population
Census	Pop.	Note	%±
1880	246		—
1960	896		—
1970	1,076		20.1%
1980	944		−12.3%
1990	924		−2.1%
2000	906		−1.9%
2010	1,229		35.7%
2020	1,075		−12.5%
U.S. Decennial Census

=== 2020 census ===
As of the 2020 census, Sweetser had a population of 1,075. The median age was 41.3 years. 24.0% of residents were under the age of 18 and 21.1% of residents were 65 years of age or older. For every 100 females there were 102.8 males, and for every 100 females age 18 and over there were 99.8 males age 18 and over.

94.1% of residents lived in urban areas, while 5.9% lived in rural areas.

There were 454 households in Sweetser, of which 33.7% had children under the age of 18 living in them. Of all households, 54.0% were married-couple households, 18.3% were households with a male householder and no spouse or partner present, and 22.7% were households with a female householder and no spouse or partner present. About 26.4% of all households were made up of individuals and 13.4% had someone living alone who was 65 years of age or older.

There were 474 housing units, of which 4.2% were vacant. The homeowner vacancy rate was 1.6% and the rental vacancy rate was 2.3%.

Racial composition as of the 2020 census
Race	Number	Percent
White	1,013	94.2%
Black or African American	8	0.7%
American Indian and Alaska Native	1	0.1%
Asian	0	0.0%
Native Hawaiian and Other Pacific Islander	1	0.1%
Some other race	11	1.0%
Two or more races	41	3.8%
Hispanic or Latino (of any race)	48	4.5%

=== 2010 census ===
As of the census of 2010, there were 1,229 people, 494 households, and 364 families residing in the town. The population density was 1,216.8 inhabitants per square mile (469.8/km^{2}). There were 532 housing units at an average density of 526.7 per square mile (203.4/km^{2}). The racial makeup of the town was 95.2% White, 0.4% African American, 0.7% Native American, 0.3% Asian, 2.0% from other races, and 1.5% from two or more races. Hispanic or Latino of any race were 4.5% of the population.

There were 494 households, of which 32.0% had children under the age of 18 living with them, 60.5% were married couples living together, 8.9% had a female householder with no husband present, 4.3% had a male householder with no wife present, and 26.3% were non-families. 22.7% of all households were made up of individuals, and 10.5% had someone living alone who was 65 years of age or older. The average household size was 2.49 and the average family size was 2.91.

The median age in the town was 40.5 years. 25.3% of residents were under the age of 18; 7.3% were between the ages of 18 and 24; 22.2% were from 25 to 44; 29.1% were from 45 to 64; and 16.1% were 65 years of age or older. The gender makeup of the town was 47.7% male and 52.3% female.

=== 2000 census ===
As of the census of 2000, there were 906 people, 357 households, and 269 families residing in the town. The population density was 929.2 inhabitants per square mile (358.8/km^{2}). There were 371 housing units at an average density of 380.5 per square mile (146.9/km^{2}). The racial makeup of the town was 97.68% White, 0.44% Native American, 0.11% Asian, 0.33% from other races, and 1.43% from two or more races. Hispanic or Latino of any race were 2.10% of the population.

There were 357 households, out of which 33.6% had children under the age of 18 living with them, 62.7% were married couples living together, 10.1% had a female householder with no husband present, and 24.4% were non-families. 22.4% of all households were made up of individuals, and 14.3% had someone living alone who was 65 years of age or older. The average household size was 2.54 and the average family size was 2.97.

In the town, the population was spread out, with 26.5% under the age of 18, 6.5% from 18 to 24, 26.3% from 25 to 44, 24.7% from 45 to 64, and 16.0% who were 65 years of age or older. The median age was 40 years. For every 100 females, there were 94.0 males. For every 100 females age 18 and over, there were 92.5 males.

The median income for a household in the town was $39,722, and the median income for a family was $49,327. Males had a median income of $43,542 versus $22,054 for females. The per capita income for the town was $19,907. About 3.9% of families and 5.0% of the population were below the poverty line, including 6.1% of those under age 18 and 5.7% of those age 65 or over.

== Media ==
The first newspaper to be published in Sweetser was the Sun Sentinel, which began operations sometime before 1894. The editor was James Pinkerton.

Currently, residents are served by the daily Marion Chronicle-Tribune and the weekly Oak Hill Times.

== Churches ==
The Lutheran church which pre-dated the establishment of the town first met in 1865 under the name of St. Paul's under the pastorage of Rev. T.E. Sharah with twenty-three charter members. For thirty years, the meetings were held in private homes, the Jalapa school, Cart Creek school and the Mark school house. In 1896, the members furnished materials and labor to construct a church building at 301 West Delphi Road. In 1947, this church was abandoned, and it was converted into a two-story duplex residence.

The Cart Creek Church of the Brethren began in 1893 in a new church house erected on land donated by Joseph Winger Sr. at 500W & 400N, three miles north of Sweetser. This church was the nucleus of the Sweetser Church of the Brethren which was organized in 1959.

First mention of Sweetser in the Methodist Church conference minutes was in 1875. Local preachers mentioned were John Hubert, Allen Meek, Andrew Green and Joseph Leazenby. The first Methodist church was located on the northwest corner of Main Street and State Road 18.

Currently, the town is served by the Sweetser United Methodist Church, the Sweetser Wesleyan Church, and Liberty Baptist Church.

== Government ==
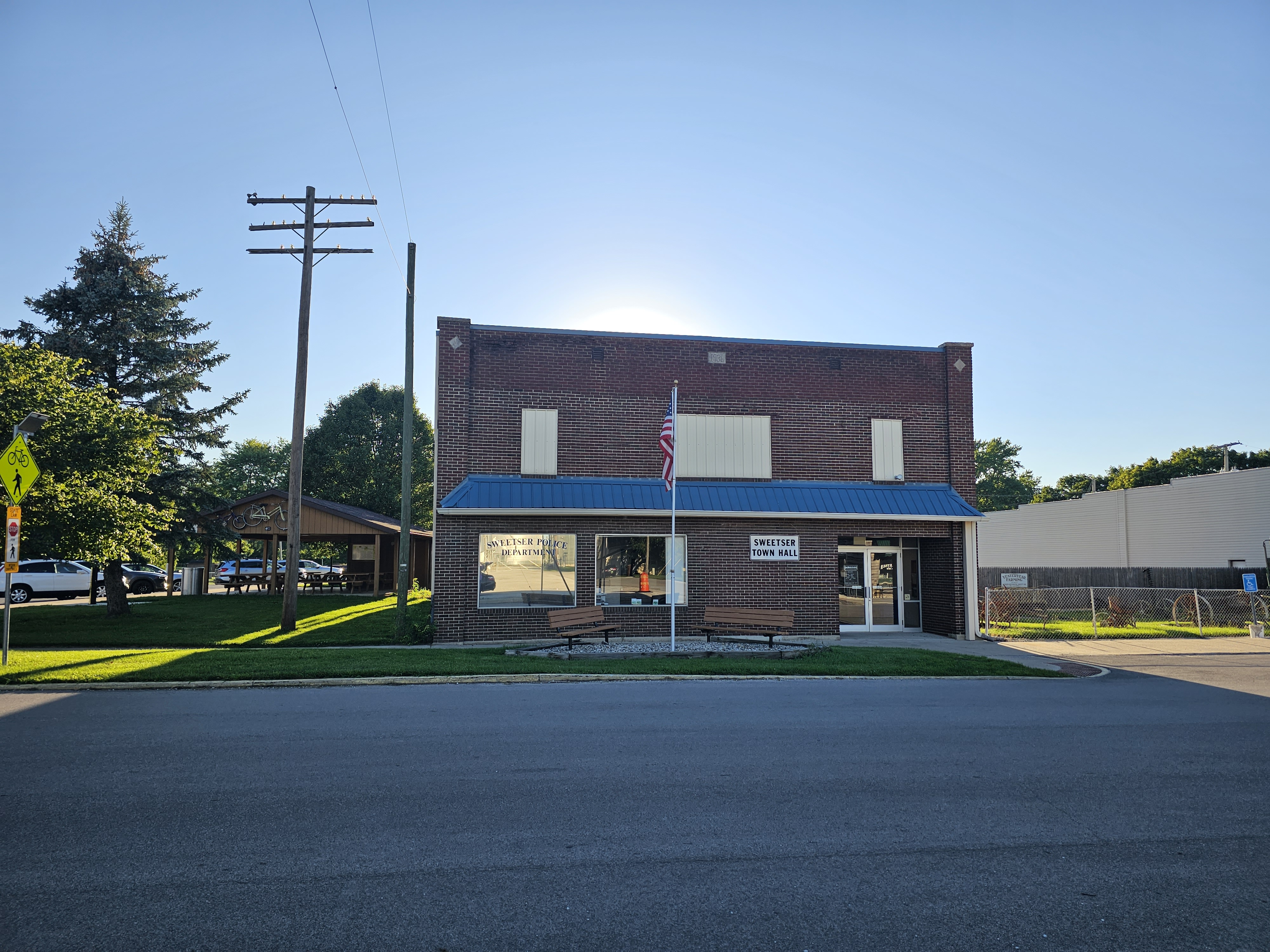
Sweetser Town Hall

Sweetser is governed by a five-member town council, all of whom serve at-large and by tradition run as independents.

Current council members are President Kyle Taylor, Vice-President Travis Lemaster, Warren Daily, Tyler Wineinger and one vacant seat.

== Police and fire protection ==
Police protection is provided by the Town Marshal and his deputies and reserve officers.

Fire protection is provided by the all-volunteer Pleasant Township Volunteer Fire Department, which operates from the fire station located at the corner of State Road 18 and Main Street.

== Utilities ==
Water is provided to residents of Sweetser through individual household wells.

Sewage is piped to nearby Marion for treatment. In 2011, the town announced plans to build its own $2.4 million wastewater treatment plant.

The incumbent landline telephone provider is the Sweetest Telephone Company, formerly known as the Sweetest Rural Telephone Company. It is one of Indiana's larger independent telephone companies.

== Parks and recreation ==
Sweetser is home of the Sweetser Switch Trail, a three-mile asphalt trail located in the center of town. The trailhead features two restored railcars and a statue of Garfield. Restrooms, parking and water are available at the trailhead. The trail connects one mile east of Main Street with the Cardinal Greenway in Marion."Sweetser Switch Trail".

Pawadise Park, is a unique feature along the Sweetser Switch Trail. Completed in July 2012, the park is located one-quarter mile west of Main Street next to the trail. The park was funded totally by donations. Dogs of all sizes can run unleashed here. The park has two separate areas, one for large dogs and one for small, and will include a small area for pet owners to memorialize their pets.

=== Gallery ===
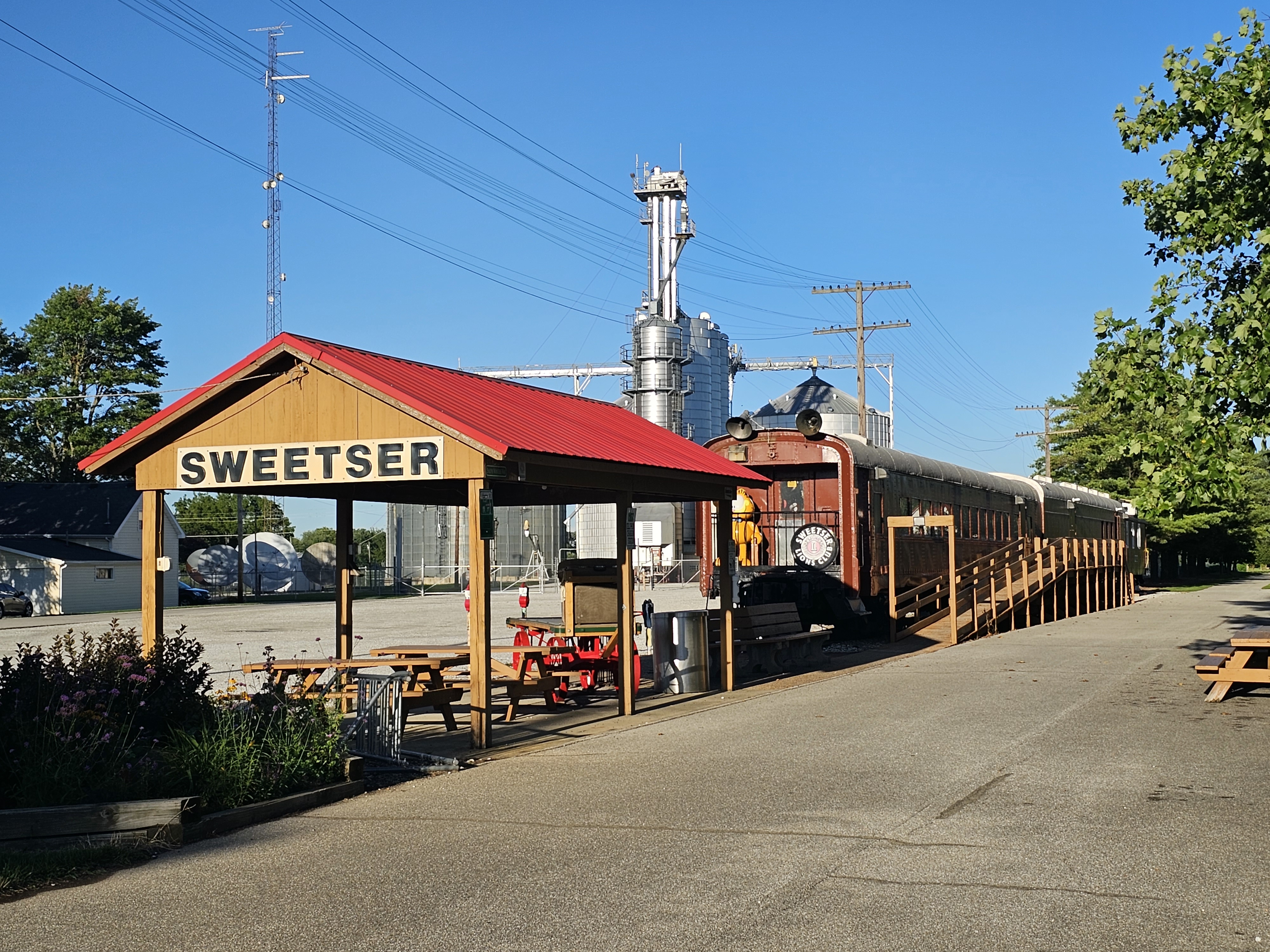
Restored rail cars and statue of Garfield on the Sweetser Switch Trail

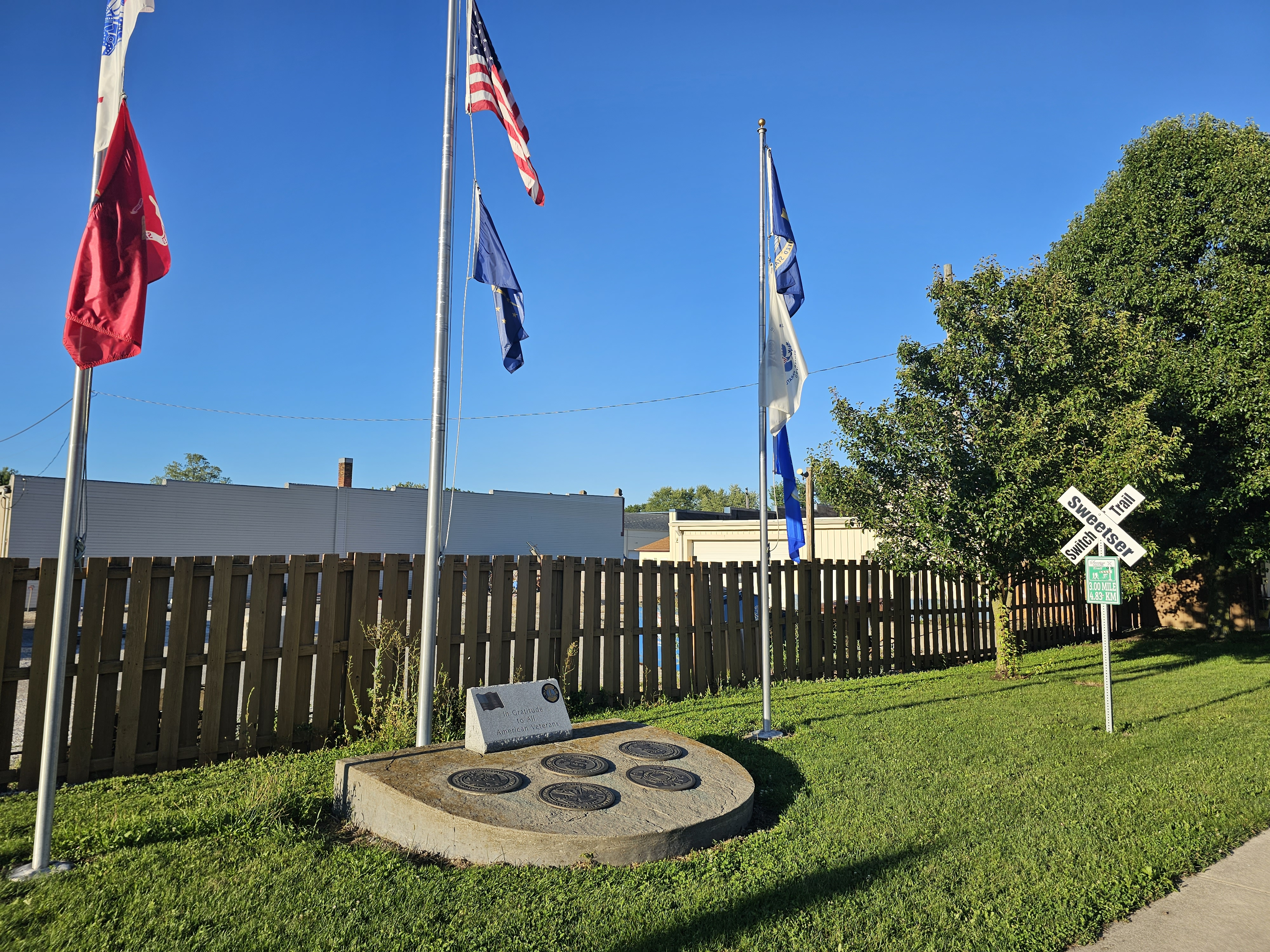
Veteran's Memorial on Sweetser Switch Trail

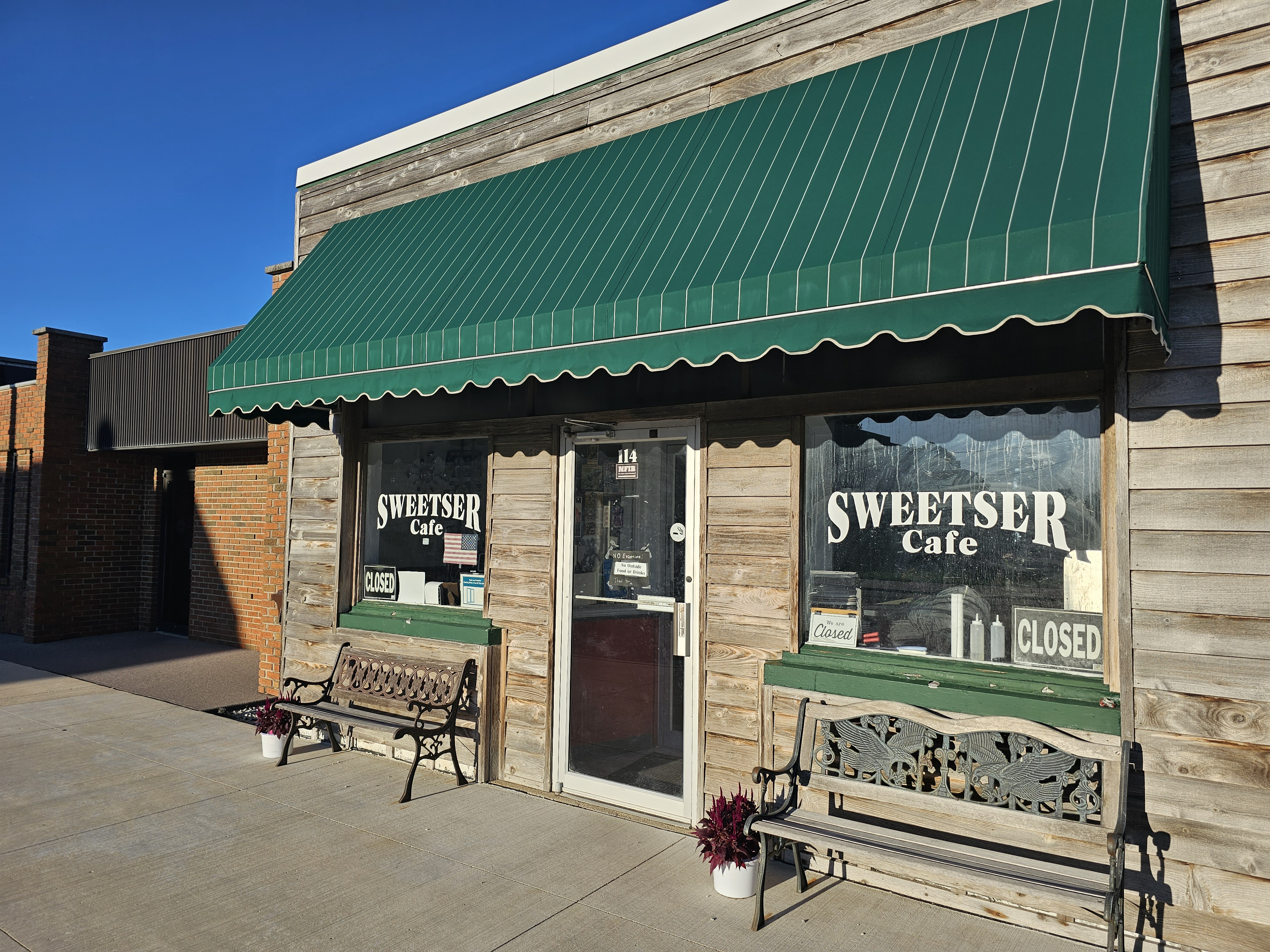
Sweetser Cafe

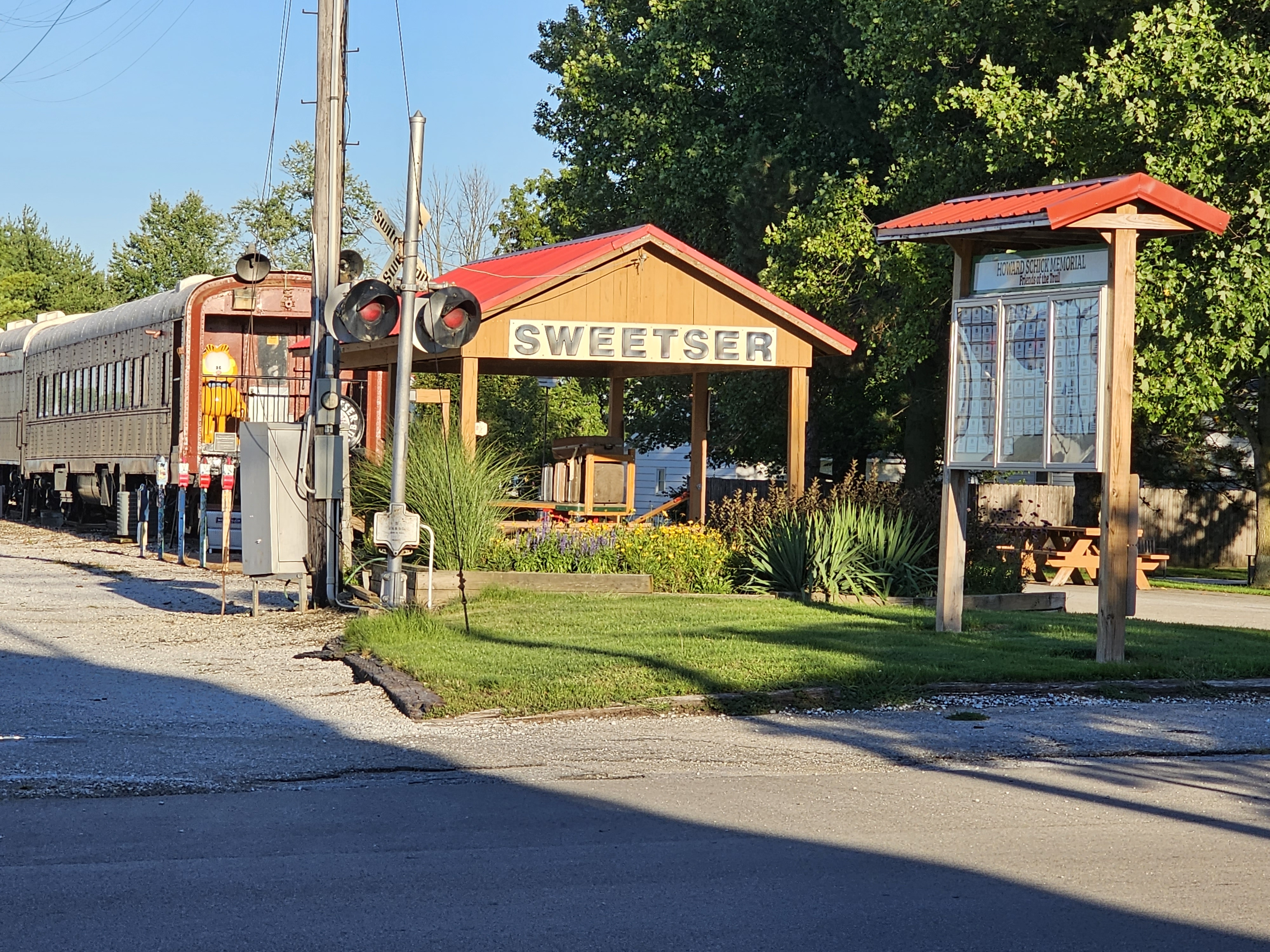
Sweetser Garfield and train cars

== Education ==
Sweetser is part of the Oak Hill School District and home to the Sweetser Elementary school.

Sweetser residents may obtain a free library card from the Converse-Jackson Township Public Library in Converse.

== Festivals and events ==
Sweetser is home to the annual Pumpkin Walk, a community-wide parade down Main Street held near Halloween, which features costume judging contests and pumpkin carving contests.

The Sweetser's Farmers Market runs from June through September on Saturdays at the Sweetser Elementary School.

== Notable people ==
- Keith O'Conner Murphy, Rockabilly Hall of Fame. Singer-songwriter, Stacy, Polydor Records, and King Records (United States)
