= Liberty Township, Howard County, Indiana =

Liberty Township
- Township
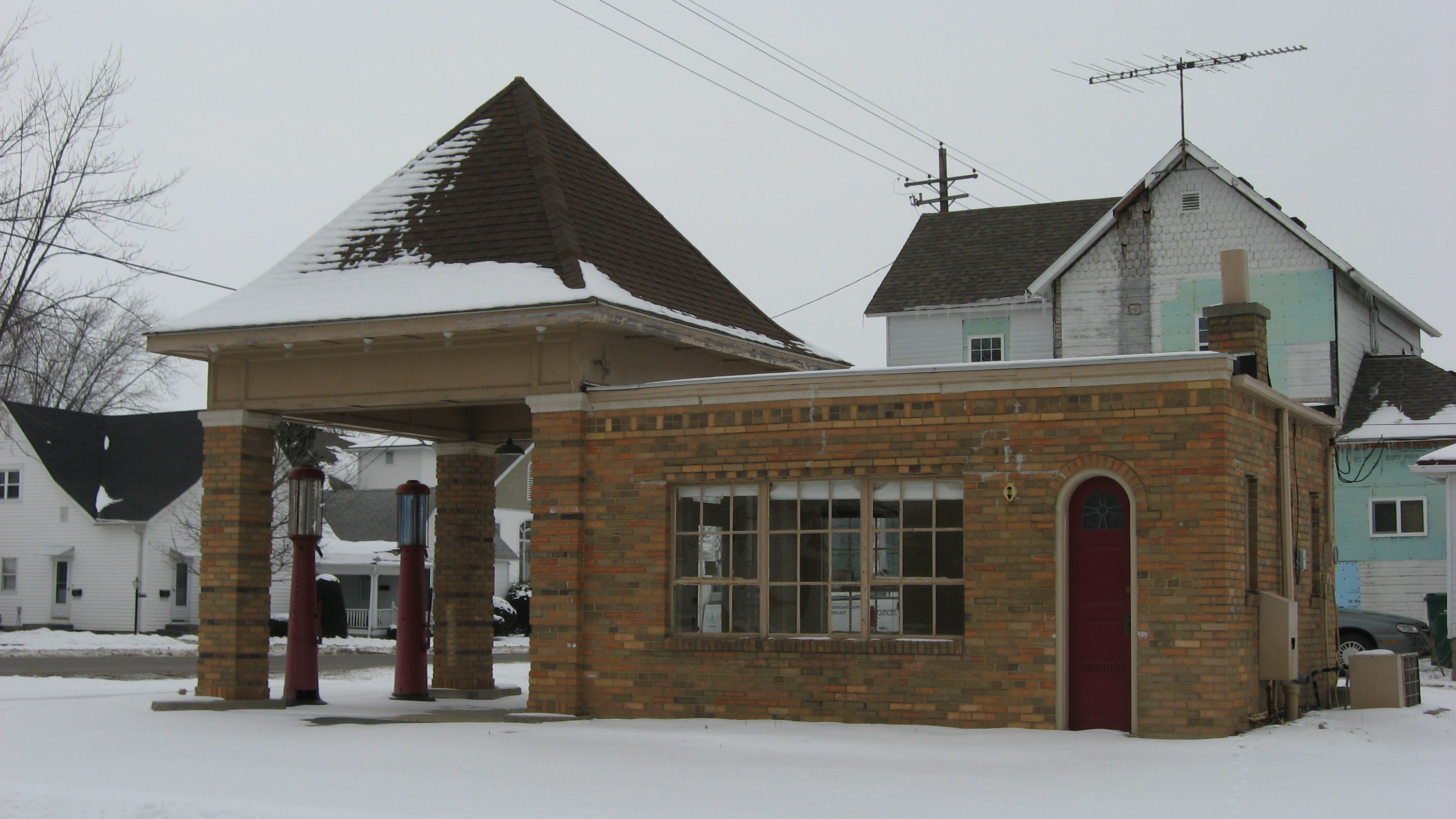
- The Hy-Red Gasoline Station, a historic site in Liberty Township

- Location in Howard County
- Coordinates: 40°29′59″N 85°58′51″W
- Country: United States
- State: Indiana
- County: Howard
- Established: 1860

Government
  - Type: Indiana township

Area
  - Total: 31.77 sq mi (82.3 km^{2})
  - Land: 31.53 sq mi (81.7 km^{2})
  - Water: 0.24 sq mi (0.62 km^{2}) 0.76%
- Elevation: 850 ft (260 m)

Population (2020)
  - Total: 4,737
  - Density: 154.2/sq mi (59.5/km^{2})
- GNIS feature ID: 0453557

Liberty Township is one of eleven townships in Howard County, Indiana, United States. As of the 2020 census, its population was 4,737, down from 4,862 in 2010. Liberty Township hosts the Howard County fair each year in July in Greentown, which is the second biggest town in Howard County, and third biggest in the Kokomo Metropolitan Area after only Kokomo, and Tipton.

== History ==
Liberty Township was founded in 1858.

== Geography ==
Historical population
Census	Pop.	Note	%±
2000	5,032		—
2010	4,862		−3.4%
2020	4,737		−2.6%
U.S. Census

According to the 2010 census, the township has a total area of 31.77 square miles (82.3 km^{2}), of which 31.53 square miles (81.7 km^{2}) (or 99.24%) is land and 0.24 square miles (0.62 km^{2}) (or 0.76%) is water.

=== Cities and towns ===
- Greentown

=== Unincorporated towns ===
- Guy
- Plevna

=== Adjacent townships ===
- Harrison Township, Miami County (north)
- Jackson Township, Miami County (northeast)
- Jackson Township (east)
- Union Township (southeast)
- Taylor Township (southwest)
- Howard Township (west)
- Clay Township, Miami County (northwest)

=== Major highways ===
- US 35
- SR 19
- SR 22
- SR 213

== Cemeteries ==
The township contains five cemeteries: Freeman, Greenlawn, Hochstedler, Mast and Shrock. Lamb Cemetery, Lindley Cemetery

== Libraries ==
- Greentown Main Public Library, in Eastern Junior & Senior High School
- Greentown Children's Public Library, in Eastern Elementary School
- Kokomo-Howard County Public Library Main Branch (in Kokomo, but serves Liberty Township outside of Greentown)
- Kokomo-Howard County Public Library South Branch (in Kokomo, but serves Liberty Township outside of Greentown)

== Schools ==
- Eastern-Howard Elementary School
- Eastern Junior & Senior High School
