= Pleven (disambiguation) =

Pleven is a major town in Northern Bulgaria, capital of the Pleven Province.

Pleven may also refer to:

- Pleven Province, a province in Northern Bulgaria
- Pleven Municipality
- Siege of Plevna, an important battle during the Russo-Turkish War, 1877-78
- Pleven (horse), a horse breed
- Pléven, a commune in the Côtes-d'Armor department in France
- Pleven plan, a plan to create a supranational European army, proposed by René Pleven
- Pleven Medical University
- Pleven Panorama

== People with the surname ==
- René Pleven, French politician

== See also ==
- Plevna (disambiguation)
