= Joni T. Johnson =

American artist (1934–1988)

- Born: Joan T. Johnson; May 20, 1934; Swayzee, Indiana
- Died: June 15, 1988 (aged 54); Indianapolis, Indiana
- Education: Arsenal Technical High School, Indianapolis, John Herron Art Institute, Charles E. Burchfield
- Known for: Watercolor painter
- Spouse: Merle Griggs
- Awards: Two of Johnson's paintings hang in the White House East Room.

Joni T. Johnson (1934–1988) was an American painter from Swayzee, Indiana.

== Education ==
Johnson went to Arsenal Technical High School in Indianapolis and attended the John Herron Art Institute.

== Career ==
From the 1950s through the late '70s, Johnson worked in Indianapolis, where she displayed and sold her art in several galleries, and was a founder of the Talbott Street Art Fair. She had a mini-retrospective in 1977 in the Art Pavilion at L.S. Ayres. Watercolor was her primary medium, and she is best known for her representations of children and the female figure.

For a short time, Johnson lived and worked in Chicago, where she studied with Charles E. Burchfield.

Two of Johnson's paintings hang in the White House East Room, and her works have hung in 27 countries. Her paintings, always signed J.T. Johnson, have been owned by Katharine Hepburn, Harry Belafonte, Lana Turner, Joel Grey, Vincent Price, Jack Holland, Frances Myers, and Constance Vinson. Johnson had showings at the fashionable Laurie-Landis Boutique in Zionsville, Indiana, circa 1970. Her works were sought after in the Indianapolis metro area.
