= Rich Martell =

British entrepreneur and investor (born 1989)

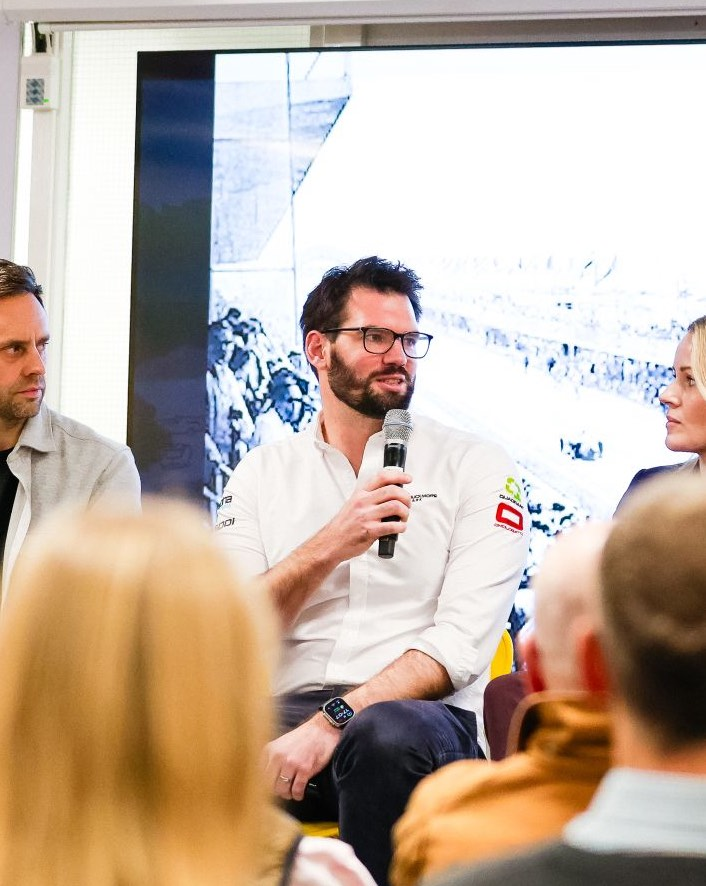
- Martell at Buckmore Park in 2025
- Born: Richard Lewis Martell; 10 February 1989 (age 37); Bedford, Bedfordshire, England
- Education: University College London
- Occupations: Entrepreneur, investor, television personality
- Years active: 2005–present
- Known for: Founder of Floxx, creator of FitFinder, co-founder of Orderswift
- Television: Million Dollar Intern
- Title: Chief Executive Officer

Richard Lewis Martell (/mɑːrˈtɛl/; born 10 February 1989), known as Rich Martell, is a British entrepreneur and investor. He is best known as the founder of Floxx and the creator of the social networking website FitFinder. Martell is also the founder of Orderswift, a restaurant technology platform, and the co-owner of Buckmore Park Kart Circuit in Kent. He has appeared as a business mentor on the BBC television series Million Dollar Intern.

== Early life and education ==
Martell began his primary education at Bedford School and later attended University College London, where he studied economics and computer science. He founded his first online business at the age of 15, using income from his early projects to support his education. During his time at university, Martell also worked within the technology divisions of different investment firms, including Goldman Sachs.

== Career and Companies ==
=== FitFinder ===
While studying at University College London, Martell launched the social networking website FitFinder in April 2010. The platform allowed university students to post anonymous messages about people they had seen on campus. It quickly gained national attention for its popularity and controversy. Due to complaints from different universities, Martell was suspended from his school and pressured to take the site down. At age 15, he had hacked into his school's database to retrieve a teacher's phone number for a friend, a prank he later described as something he was not proud of. Martell later announced plans to relaunch the project in an updated form.

=== Floxx Media Group ===
In 2011, Martell founded Floxx, a digital media and technology company initially inspired by FitFinder. The platform evolved into a mobile social networking platform that allowed users to share locations of anything of interest, not just people. The company received investment from Doug Richard and American entrepreneur Kevin Wall. It later focused toward mobile and location-based applications. In 2011, the company launched MapChat and Spottd, both designed to connect users through nearby posts and shared locations. By 2012, Floxx had expanded into a broader digital media business, offering mobile product development and design services.

=== Orderswift ===
In 2013, Martell founded Orderswift, a UK-based restaurant technology platform that provides online ordering and digital menu solutions for the hospitality sector. The company supports both independent venues and national chains with software for online and in-store order management.

=== Buckmore Park ===
In 2017, Martell and his wife, Leonora, took over the ownership of Buckmore Park Kart Circuit, a venue historically linked with Formula 1 drivers such as Lewis Hamilton and Jenson Button. In 2025, the circuit secured planning permission for a new paddock complex, a restaurant, and upgraded visitor facilities. Press coverage of the redevelopment described the project as an effort to modernise and expand the venue's motorsport offerings and visitor experience. Buckmore Park received a Gold award at the Visit Kent Tourism Awards in 2019.

=== Million Dollar Intern ===
In 2013, Martell was filmed as part of the BBC Worldwide television series, Million Dollar Intern.

== Recognition ==
In 2011, he was named as one of Business Zone's 'One to Watch'. In the same year, he was shortlisted for the Real Business Young Entrepreneur of the Year.

== Personal life ==
Martell is married to Leonora Surtees, daughter of John Surtees CBE, the Formula 1 and motorcycle world champion. The couple live in Surrey and have two children.

== See also ==
- Floxx
- FitFinder
- List of University College London people
- Social networking service
- Startup company
- Online food ordering
