= FLOX =

Combustion process

FLOX is a flameless combustion process developed by WS Wärmeprozesstechnik GmbH.

== History ==
In experiments with industrial gasoline engines conducted in April 1990, Joachim Alfred Wünning found that when combustion occurred at a temperature greater than 850 °C, the flames were blown away. Although this observation was initially thought to be an error, it turned out to be a discovery which led to the invention of what he called FLOX-Technology, a name derived from the German expression "flammenlose Oxidation" (flameless oxidation). The advantages of this technology attracted funding for a project at Stuttgart University called FloxCoal, a programme aiming to engineer a flameless atomizing coal burner. The reduced pollutant emission in FLOX combustion has been considered a promising candidate for use in coal pollution mitigation and the higher efficiency combustion in FLOX received increased interest as a result of the 1990 oil price shock. FLOX burners have since been used within furnaces in the steel and metallurgical industries.

== Technology ==
FLOX requires the air and fuel components to be mixed in an environment in which exhaust gases are recirculated back into the combustion chamber. Flameless combustion also does not display the same high energy peaks as the traditional combustion observed within a swirl burner, resulting in a more smooth and stable combustion process.

When combustion occurs, NO_{x} is formed at the front of the flame: suppression of peak flame offers the theoretical possibility of reducing NO_{x} production to zero. Experiments with FLOX-Technology have established that it can reduce the amount of NO_{x} generated by 20% in the case of Rhenisch brown coal, and by 65% in the case of Polish black coal.

The role of combustion temperature in NO_{x} formation has been understood for some time. Reduction of the combustion temperature in gasoline engines, by reducing the compression ratio, was among the first steps taken to comply with the U.S. clean air act in the 1970s. This lowered the NO_{x} emissions by lowering the temperature at the flame front.
