= Guy, Indiana =

- Unincorporated community
- Location within Indiana Location within the United States
- Coordinates: 40°26′07″N 85°58′32″W
- Country: United States
- State: Indiana
- County: Howard
- Township: Liberty
- Elevation: 850 ft (260 m)
- ZIP code: 46936
- FIPS code: 18-30276
- GNIS feature ID: 435564

Guy is an unincorporated community in Liberty Township, Howard County, Indiana, United States. It is part of the Kokomo, Indiana Metropolitan Statistical Area.
