= Union Township, Howard County, Indiana =

Union Township
- Township
- Location in Howard County
- Coordinates: 40°26′25″N 85°54′47″W
- Country: United States
- State: Indiana
- County: Howard

Government
  - Type: Indiana township

Area
  - Total: 25.83 sq mi (66.9 km^{2})
  - Land: 25.8 sq mi (67 km^{2})
  - Water: 0.03 sq mi (0.078 km^{2}) 0.12%
- Elevation: 850 ft (259 m)

Population (2020)
  - Total: 1,012
  - Density: 39.9/sq mi (15.4/km^{2})
- GNIS feature ID: 0453918

Union Township is one of eleven townships in Howard County, Indiana, United States. As of the 2020 census, its population was 1,012, down from 1,029 in 2010.

== History ==
Union Township was organized in 1853.

== Geography ==
Historical population
Census	Pop.	Note	%±
2000	1,056		—
2010	1,029		−2.6%
2020	1,012		−1.7%
U.S. Census

According to the 2010 census, the township has a total area of 25.83 square miles (66.9 km^{2}), of which 25.8 square miles (67 km^{2}) (or 99.88%) is land and 0.03 square miles (0.078 km^{2}) (or 0.12%) is water.

=== Unincorporated towns ===
- Jerome
- Phlox
- West Liberty

(This list is based on USGS data and may include former settlements.)

=== Adjacent townships ===
- Jackson Township (north)
- Sims Township, Grant County (northeast)
- Green Township, Grant County (east)
- Wildcat Township, Tipton County (south)
- Taylor Township (west)
- Liberty Township (northwest)

=== Cemeteries ===
The township contains three cemeteries: Jerome, New Hope and Union Civil.

=== Major highways ===
- US 35
- SR 19
- SR 22
- SR 26
- SR 213

=== Airports and landing strips ===
- Hall Airport
- Howard County Airport
