= Swirl burner =

Type of gas burner

A swirl burner, or vortex burner, is a type of burner that swirls the air, fuel, or both inside to increase mixing between the two. This process enables flame stabilization and can reduce greenhouse gas emissions. These burners are used in industrial settings.

== Types ==
There are three main types of swirl burners: axial vane, tangential, and volute. The vane-type swirl burner utilizes vanes to stabilize the flame. Tangential swirl burners use tangential inflows. Inflows must be placed upstream to have uniform tangential velocity. The swirl will also decay progressing along the burner and may not be strong enough when it exits. Volute burners are rarer and have a central spinning apparatus.

== Mechanics ==
This process creates a space for flame stabilization. As air moves through the system, it rotates as a result of the shape of the apparatus. A central recirculation zone is created from the spin. A quarl is found downstream of the guide vanes. Swirl burners increase combustion efficiency through the promotion of ignition of unburnt fuel. A more homogeneous mixture of air and fuel improves combustion efficiency. The swirl number, represented by S_{n}, is the axial flux of angular momentum to that of axial momentum. Higher swirls can lead to negative axial velocity in the center of expansion.

== Application ==
Swirl burners are used in industrial settings including uses as heating, power generators, and incinerators.

Low-swirl combustion can be utilized in industrial burners and gas-fired power plants to meet low-emission standards. Able to produce 150 kW to 7.5 MW of power, emissions from swirl burners are around four to seven parts per million of NO_{x} and carbon monoxide. Decreasing NO_{x} emissions can lead to an increase in carbon monoxide emissions.
