= Converse, Indiana =

- Town
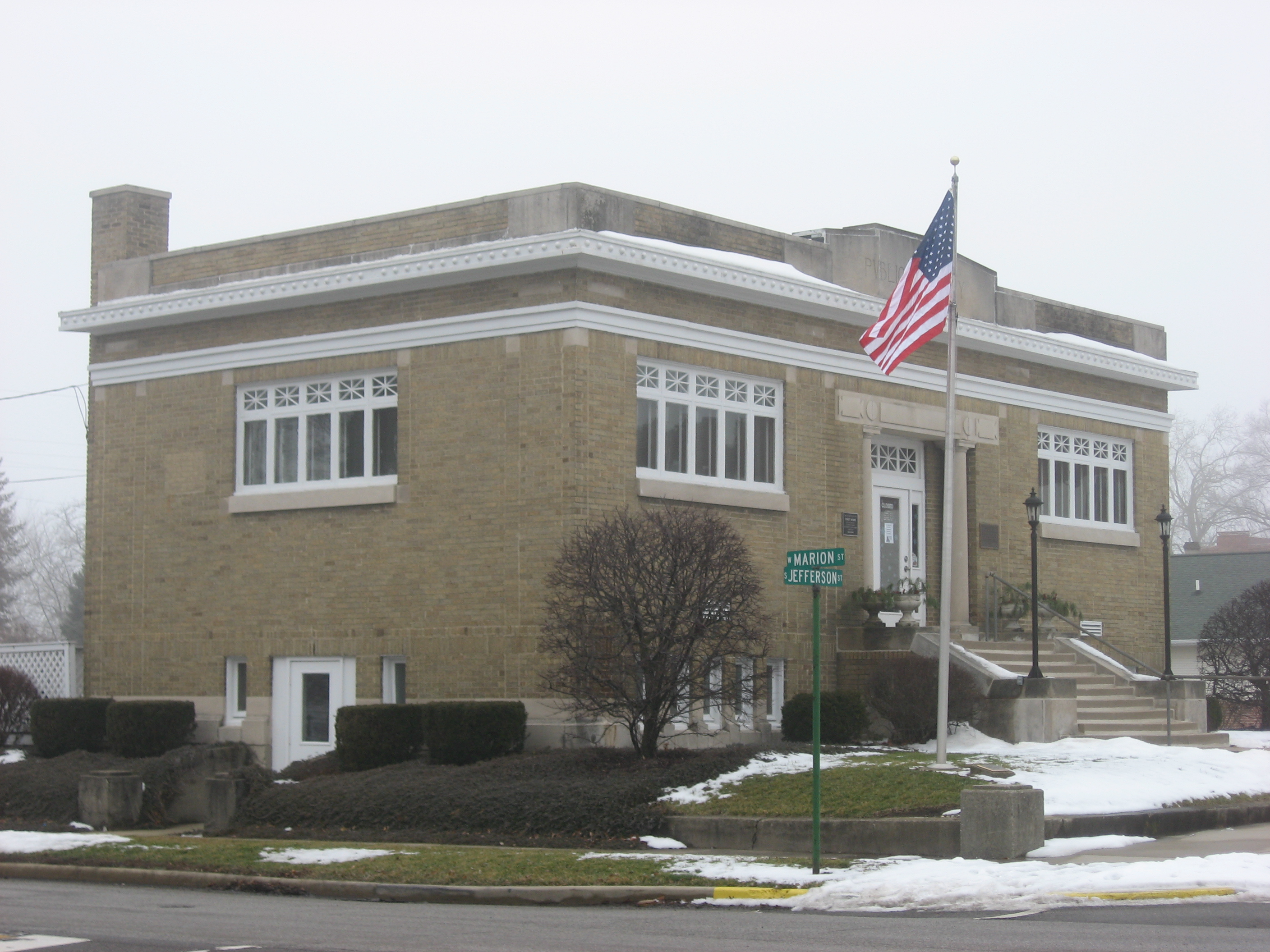
- Library in Converse

- Location in Grant and Miami counties, Indiana
- Coordinates: 40°34′37″N 85°52′40″W
- Country: United States
- State: Indiana
- Counties: Miami, Grant
- Townships: Jackson, Richland

Area
  - Total: 0.99 sq mi (2.57 km^{2})
  - Land: 0.99 sq mi (2.56 km^{2})
  - Water: 0.0039 sq mi (0.01 km^{2})
- Elevation: 830 ft (250 m)

Population (2020)
  - Total: 1,161
  - Density: 1,174/sq mi (453.3/km^{2})
- Time zone: UTC-5 (Eastern (EST))
  - Summer (DST): UTC-5 (EST)
- ZIP code: 46919
- Area code: 765
- FIPS code: 18-14986
- GNIS feature ID: 2396660
- Website: www.in.gov/towns/converse/

Converse is a town in Jackson Township, Miami County, and Richland Township, Grant County, in the U.S. state of Indiana. The population was 1,161 at the 2020 census.

== History ==
Converse was originally called "Xenia", and under the latter name was laid out in 1849. J. N. Converse platted an addition in 1867.

The Converse Depot and Converse-Jackson Township Public Library are listed on the National Register of Historic Places.

== Geography ==
Converse is located in the southeast corner of Miami County and in northwestern Grant County. Indiana State Roads 18 and 19 pass through the center of town together as Marion Street, splitting 2.5 miles (4.0 km) to the east in Mier, and 3 miles (5 km) to the west. SR 19 leads northwest 18 miles (29 km) to Peru, the Miami county seat, and southeast 7 miles (11 km) to Swayzee, while SR 18 leads east 12 miles (19 km) to Marion, the Grant county seat, and west 17 miles (27 km) to Galveston. Converse Airport is 1 mile (1.6 km) west of the town.

According to the U.S. Census Bureau, Converse has a total area of 0.99 square miles (2.56 km^{2}), of which 0.002 square miles (0.005 km^{2}), or 0.20%, are water. Little Pipe Creek runs along the western border of the town, and Taylor Creek crosses the eastern extension of the town. Both creeks run north to Pipe Creek, a northwest-flowing tributary of the Wabash River.

== Demographics ==
Historical population
Census	Pop.	Note	%±
1880	732		—
1890	921		25.8%
1900	1,415		53.6%
1910	1,164		−17.7%
1920	1,049		−9.9%
1930	931		−11.2%
1940	943		1.3%
1950	979		3.8%
1960	1,044		6.6%
1970	1,163		11.4%
1980	1,279		10.0%
1990	1,144		−10.6%
2000	1,137		−0.6%
2010	1,265		11.3%
2020	1,161		−8.2%
U.S. Decennial Census

=== 2020 census ===
As of the 2020 census, Converse had a population of 1,161. The median age was 40.3 years. 24.1% of residents were under the age of 18 and 18.5% of residents were 65 years of age or older. For every 100 females there were 94.8 males, and for every 100 females age 18 and over there were 90.3 males age 18 and over.

0.0% of residents lived in urban areas, while 100.0% lived in rural areas.

There were 482 households in Converse, of which 31.7% had children under the age of 18 living in them. Of all households, 44.8% were married-couple households, 19.1% were households with a male householder and no spouse or partner present, and 30.5% were households with a female householder and no spouse or partner present. About 34.4% of all households were made up of individuals and 15.1% had someone living alone who was 65 years of age or older.

There were 556 housing units, of which 13.3% were vacant. The homeowner vacancy rate was 2.4% and the rental vacancy rate was 14.0%.

Racial composition as of the 2020 census
Race	Number	Percent
White	1,072	92.3%
Black or African American	4	0.3%
American Indian and Alaska Native	2	0.2%
Asian	6	0.5%
Native Hawaiian and Other Pacific Islander	0	0.0%
Some other race	4	0.3%
Two or more races	73	6.3%
Hispanic or Latino (of any race)	50	4.3%

=== 2010 census ===
As of the census of 2010, there were 1,265 people, 489 households, and 337 families living in the town. The population density was 1,405.6 inhabitants per square mile (542.7/km^{2}). There were 553 housing units at an average density of 614.4 per square mile (237.2/km^{2}). The racial makeup of the town was 97.5% White, 0.1% African American, 0.2% Native American, 0.1% Asian, 0.1% Pacific Islander, 1.1% from other races, and 0.9% from two or more races. Hispanic or Latino of any race were 4.2% of the population.

There were 489 households, of which 38.2% had children under the age of 18 living with them, 51.3% were married couples living together, 13.7% had a female householder with no husband present, 3.9% had a male householder with no wife present, and 31.1% were non-families. 27.2% of all households were made up of individuals, and 12.7% had someone living alone who was 65 years of age or older. The average household size was 2.59 and the average family size was 3.12.

The median age in the town was 36.9 years. 29.7% of residents were under the age of 18; 6.4% were between the ages of 18 and 24; 27.3% were from 25 to 44; 23.8% were from 45 to 64; and 12.8% were 65 years of age or older. The gender makeup of the town was 48.1% male and 51.9% female.

=== 2000 census ===
As of the census of 2000, there were 1,137 people, 470 households, and 329 families living in the town. The population density was 1,276.4 inhabitants per square mile (492.8/km^{2}). There were 548 housing units at an average density of 615.2 per square mile (237.5/km^{2}). The racial makeup of the town was 97.71% White, 0.18% African American, 0.35% Native American, 0.18% Asian, 0.79% from other races, and 0.79% from two or more races. Hispanic or Latino of any race were 2.99% of the population.

There were 470 households, out of which 33.0% had children under the age of 18 living with them, 56.0% were married couples living together, 11.1% had a female householder with no husband present, and 29.8% were non-families. 27.0% of all households were made up of individuals, and 13.8% had someone living alone who was 65 years of age or older. The average household size was 2.42 and the average family size was 2.91.

In the town, the population was spread out, with 26.0% under the age of 18, 6.8% from 18 to 24, 29.9% from 25 to 44, 22.6% from 45 to 64, and 14.7% who were 65 years of age or older. The median age was 37 years. For every 100 females, there were 97.4 males. For every 100 females age 18 and over, there were 90.7 males.

The median income for a household in the town was $33,333, and the median income for a family was $42,813. Males had a median income of $35,938 versus $25,441 for females. The per capita income for the town was $16,317. About 12.6% of families and 15.7% of the population were below the poverty line, including 25.6% of those under age 18 and 6.8% of those age 65 or over.

== Education ==
Oak Hill United School Corporation operates Oak Hill High School at Converse.

The town has a lending library, the Converse-Jackson Township Public Library.

== Notable persons ==
- Monte Towe, Denver Nuggets basketball player
