= Sims, Indiana =

- Census-designated place
- Location of Sims in Grant County, Indiana.

- Location within Indiana Location within the United States
- Coordinates: 40°29′58″N 85°51′24″W
- Country: United States
- State: Indiana
- County: Grant
- Township: Sims

Area
  - Total: 1.00 sq mi (2.58 km^{2})
  - Land: 1.00 sq mi (2.58 km^{2})
  - Water: 0 sq mi (0.00 km^{2})
- Elevation: 860 ft (260 m)

Population (2020)
  - Total: 164
  - Density: 164.4/sq mi (63.46/km^{2})
- ZIP code: 46986
- FIPS code: 18-69894
- GNIS feature ID: 2583470

Sims is an unincorporated community and census-designated place (CDP) in Sims Township, Grant County, Indiana. In 2010 it had a population of 156, and an increase to 164 in 2020.

== History ==
The community took its name from Sims Township. A post office was established at Sims in 1881, and remained in operation until it was discontinued in 1992.

== Geography ==
Sims is located near the western border of Grant County. It is 2 miles (3 km) west of Swayzee and 13 miles (21 km) southwest of Marion, the county seat. A rail line operated by the Central Railroad Company of Indianapolis passes along the north side of town.

According to the U.S. Census Bureau, the Sims CDP has a total area of 1.0 square mile (2.6 km^{2}), all of it land.

== Demographics ==
Historical population
Census	Pop.	Note	%±
2020	164		—
U.S. Decennial Census
