= Converse Airport =

- IATA: none; ICAO: none; FAA LID: 1I8

Summary
- Airport type: Public
- Owner: Converse BOAC
- Location: Converse, Indiana
- Elevation AMSL: 840 ft / 256 m
- Coordinates: 40°34′15″N 085°53′30″W

Map
- Location of airport in Indiana

Runways
Direction	Length		Surface
Direction	ft	m	Surface
7/25	1,800	549	Asphalt, Concrete

Converse Airport (FAA LID: 1I8) is a public airport 1 mile (1.6 km) west of Converse, in Miami County, Indiana. The airport was founded in October 1944 as one of 26 satellite airfields for Bunker Hill Naval Air Station. The town of Converse gained control of the field in November 1947, after the Navy abandoned the field when the war ended.

== See also ==
- List of airports in Indiana
