= Jerome, Indiana =

- Unincorporated community and Census-designated place
- Location within Indiana Location within the United States
- Coordinates: 40°27′24″N 85°55′58″W
- Country: United States
- State: Indiana
- County: Howard
- Township: Union
- Elevation: 840 ft (260 m)
- ZIP code: 46936
- FIPS code: 18-38484
- GNIS feature ID: 2830414

Jerome is an unincorporated community in Union Township, Howard County, Indiana, United States. It is part of the Kokomo, Indiana Metropolitan Statistical Area.

== History ==
Jerome is named after the son of its first settler, Hampton Brown. Jerome Brown later served as a county commissioner. Jerome was once incorporated as a town, in 1877.

== Demographics ==
The United States Census Bureau delineated Jerome as a census designated place in the 2022 American Community Survey.
