= Converse station =

Historic train station in Indiana, US

Converse
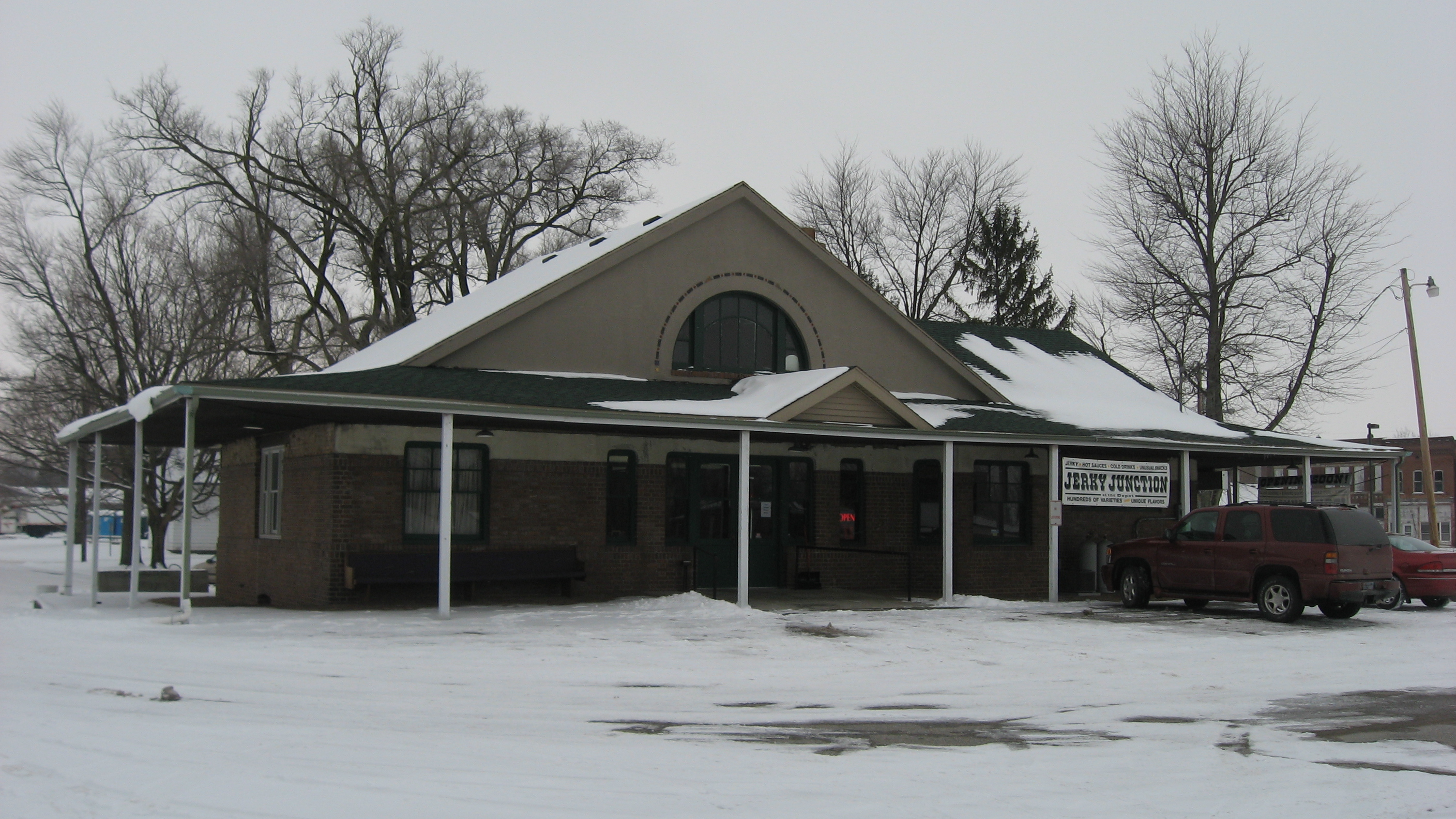
- Converse Depot, January 2011

History
- Opened: 1912

Services
Preceding station	Pennsylvania Railroad	Following station
Logansport toward Chicago	Chicago – Columbus	Marion toward Columbus
- Converse Depot
- U.S. National Register of Historic Places
- Location within Indiana Location within the United States
- Location: 203 E. Railroad St., Converse, Indiana
- Coordinates: 40°34′49″N 85°52′14″W
- Area: less than one acre
- Built: 1912
- Architect: Price and McLanahan
- Architectural style: Bungalow/craftsman
- NRHP reference No.: 95000205
- Added to NRHP: March 3, 1995
Location

Converse, also known as the Pennsylvania RR Depot, is a historic train station located at Converse, Indiana. It was built in 1912, as a 1 1/2-story, brick building in the Bungalow / American Craftsman style. It is surrounded by a deep pent roof canopy on three sides. Above the pent roof canopy is a broad stuccoed gable. It was built by the Pennsylvania Railroad and remained in use into the 1950s.

It was listed on the National Register of Historic Places in 1995 as the Converse Depot.
