= FitFinder =

Former social networking site

- Website type: Social network service
- Available in: English
- Founded: London, UK
- Headquarters: University College London, London
- Area served: United Kingdom
- Founder: Rich Martell
- Website: www.thefitfinder.co.uk
- Advertising: Banner ads, referral marketing
- Registration: Not required
- Launched: 23 April 2010
- Current status: Inactive as of 28 May 2010

FitFinder was a social networking website primarily based in the United Kingdom. FitFinder is described by its creator, Rich Martell, as localised anonymous microblogging. FitFinder is based on the concept of anonymously posting both a location and description of an attractive person whom one has spotted; this post is then immediately placed on the FitFeed, where it can be viewed by anyone.

== Background ==
The concept of the FitFinder website was conceived by Rich Martell, a computer science undergraduate studying at University College London (UCL). The website, launched in April 2010, was originally a joke between Martell and his rugby friends who would text each other when they spotted an attractive girl. The website immediately spread and became instantly viral. In the first few hours the site had over 2,000 users and had to be taken down. Once the site was back online again, its popularity grew to nearly 20,000 visitors in the first weekend. The initial success was met with huge demand for the expansion of FitFinder to more universities across the UK. By the time the site was taken down the site was reported to have had over 250,000 users over several countries with more than 5 million page views.

== Coverage ==
The FitFinder Network covered 52 UK universities, including Oxbridge, Durham University, UCL, Manchester University, Leeds, Warwick, Bath, LSE, KCL, Imperial College London, and most Red Brick universities. Prior to its closure, Martell had said that FitFinder was going to be expanded outside of universities in the near future, possibly covering sporting events and music festivals.

== Controversy ==
Because of the nature of the user-generated content on FitFinder, many commentators accused it of being offensive and inappropriate. Less than one week after the site went live, the London School of Economics emailed all their students warning them about the site. A number of complaints about the site prompted JANET, the UK network provider that serves universities, to block the site. The ban itself sparked more complaints, which led to its own reversal. In addition, UCL fined Martell for refusing to take the site down. On 28 May 2010, the FitFinder website was taken down because of "increasing pressure from universities" and the maximum fine UCL imposed on Martell for bringing the university into disrepute.

== Floxx ==
In January 2011, Martell launched a new social network - this time called Floxx. Floxx is designed to be more of a location platform which encourages location-based sharing.

== See also ==
- List of social networking websites
- List of defunct social networking websites

== Sources ==
- PC Pro - Student forced to shut down FitFinder site
- The Chronicle - Matchmaking Site Brings Romance to British University Libraries
