= Plevna =

Plevna may refer to:

- Pleven, Bulgaria, an old name for the city

Canada

- Plevna, Ontario

Finland

- Plevna, Tampere, a former industrial building in Tampere, Finland

Romania

- Plevna, a village in Suharău Commune, Botoşani County
- Plevna, a village in Grebănu Commune, Buzău County
- Plevna, a village in Lupșanu Commune, Călăraşi County
- Plevna, a village in Rediu Commune, Galați County

United States

- Plevna, Alabama
- Plevna, Indiana
- Plevna, Kansas
- Plevna, Missouri
- Plevna, Montana

== See also ==
- Siege of Plevna, a major battle of the Russo-Turkish War (1877–1878)
