= West Liberty, Howard County, Indiana =

Coordinates: 40°25′50″N 85°53′26″W

West Liberty is an unincorporated community in Union Township, Howard County, Indiana, in the United States.

== History ==
West Liberty was platted in 1853.
