= Plevna, Indiana =

- Unincorporated community
- Location within Indiana Location within the United States
- Coordinates: 40°32′09″N 85°58′34″W
- Country: United States
- State: Indiana
- County: Howard
- Township: Liberty
- Elevation: 850 ft (260 m)
- ZIP code: 46901
- FIPS code: 18-60768
- GNIS feature ID: 441359

Plevna is an unincorporated community in Liberty Township, Howard County, Indiana, United States. It is part of the Kokomo, Indiana Metropolitan Statistical Area.

Plevna is named after the Bulgarian town of Pleven (historically known as Plevna in English), which featured prominently in the news when the settlement was named.

== Economy ==
Although a small town, it does feature at least two businesses within the town limits. Plevna Implement is a farm and lawn equipment dealer selling the complete Massey Ferguson line, as well as Gleaner combines, Versatile tractors and other short-lines of equipment, and the Hustler line of lawn mowers. It was formerly a dealer in White Farm Equipment, Oliver and AGCO equipment.

Located across the street from Plevna Implement, is Shrock's Dri-Gas, a bottled gas/LP gas dealer/distributor which also sells furnaces, fireplaces and heaters. Both Plevna Implement and Shrock's Dri-Gas were founded by members of the Shrock family.

== Churches ==
The small town of Plevna is served by one church within the town limits, the Plevna Dunkard Brethren Church, part of the Dunkard Brethren denomination.
