= Phlox, Indiana =

- Unincorporated community
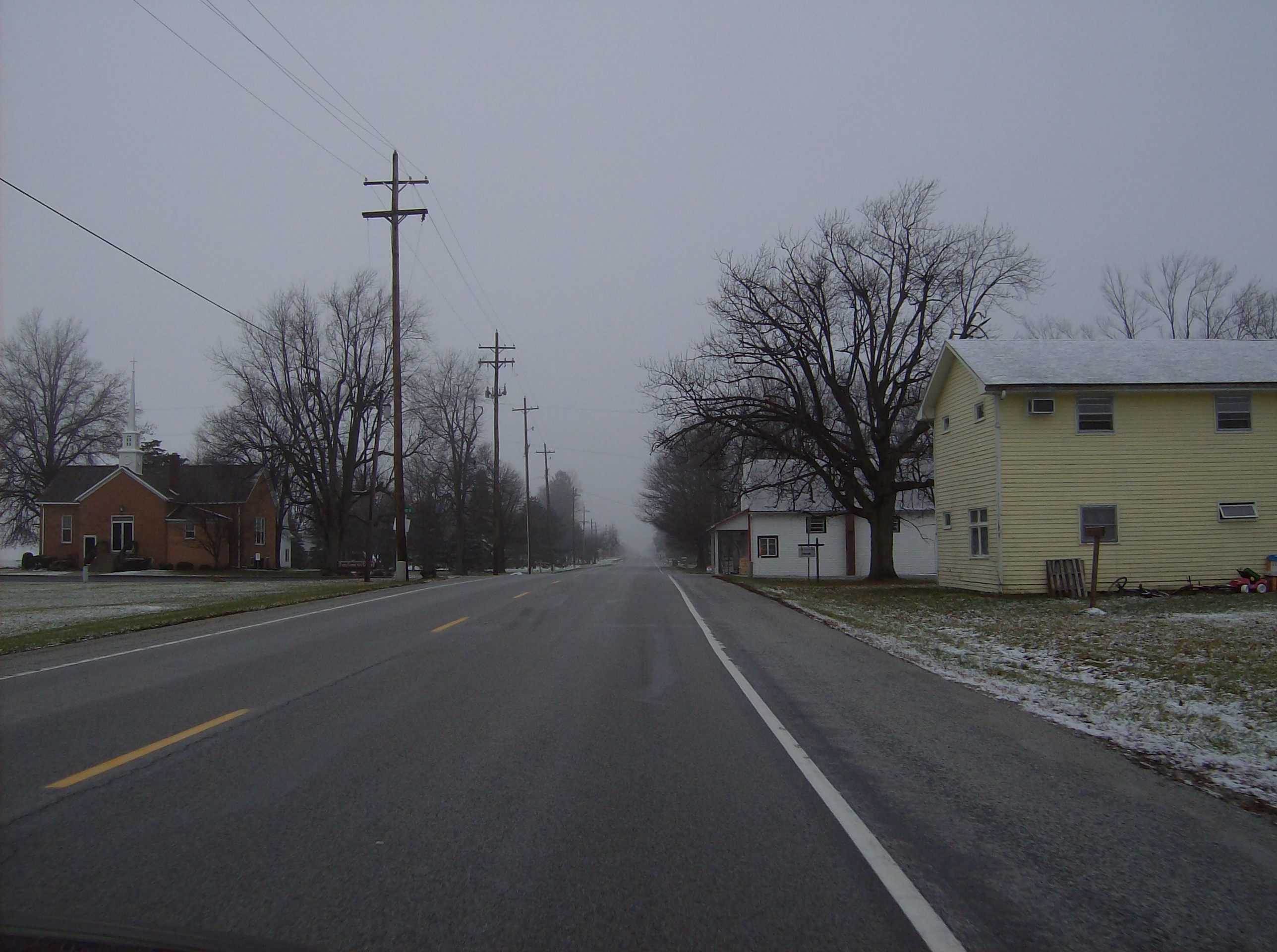
- Along State Road 26 in Phlox

- Location within Indiana Location within the United States
- Coordinates: 40°25′16″N 85°55′07″W
- Country: United States
- State: Indiana
- County: Howard
- Township: Union
- Elevation: 853 ft (260 m)
- GNIS feature ID: 441096

Phlox is an unincorporated community in southern Union Township, Howard County, Indiana, United States. It lies at the intersection of State Road 26 with County Road 1100 East.

Phlox is part of the Kokomo, Indiana Metropolitan Statistical Area.

Phlox is probably named after the local vegetation.
