= Sycamore, Indiana =

- Unincorporated community
- Location within Indiana Location within the United States
- Coordinates: 40°29′39″N 85°55′10″W
- Country: United States
- State: Indiana
- County: Howard
- Township: Jackson
- Elevation: 853 ft (260 m)
- ZIP code: 46936
- FIPS code: 18-74600
- GNIS feature ID: 444505

Sycamore is an unincorporated community in Jackson Township, Howard County, Indiana, United States. It is part of the Kokomo, Indiana Metropolitan Statistical Area.
