= NOx =

Term for nitric oxide and nitrogen dioxide

In atmospheric chemistry, NO_{x} is shorthand for nitric oxide (NO) and nitrogen dioxide (NO_{2}), the nitrogen oxides that are most relevant for air pollution. These gases contribute to the formation of smog and acid rain, as well as affecting tropospheric ozone.

NO_{x} gases are usually produced from the reaction between nitrogen and oxygen during combustion of fuels, such as hydrocarbons, in air; especially at high temperatures, such as in car engines. In areas of high motor vehicle traffic, such as in large cities, the nitrogen oxides emitted can be a significant source of air pollution. NO_{x} gases are also produced naturally by lightning.

NO_{x} does not include nitrous oxide (N_{2}O), a fairly inert oxide of nitrogen that contributes less severely to air pollution, notwithstanding its involvement in ozone depletion and high global warming potential.

NO_{y} is the class of compounds comprising NO_{x} and the NO_{z} compounds produced from the oxidation of NO_{x} which include nitric acid (HNO_{3}), nitrous acid (HONO), dinitrogen pentoxide (N_{2}O_{5}), peroxyacetyl nitrate (PAN), alkyl nitrates (RONO_{2}), peroxyalkyl nitrates (ROONO_{2}), the nitrate radical (NO_{3}), and peroxynitric acid (HNO_{4}).

== Formation and reactions ==
Because of energy limitations, oxygen and nitrogen do not react at ambient temperatures. But at high temperatures, they undergo an endothermic reaction producing various oxides of nitrogen. Such temperatures arise inside an internal combustion engine or a power station boiler, during the combustion of a mixture of air and fuel, and naturally in a lightning flash.

In atmospheric chemistry, the term NO_{x} refers to the total concentration of NO and NO_{2} since the conversion between these two species is rapid in the stratosphere and troposphere. During daylight hours, these concentrations together with that of ozone are in steady state, also known as photostationary state (PSS); the ratio of NO to NO_{2} is determined by the intensity of sunshine (which converts NO_{2} to NO) and the concentration of ozone (which reacts with NO to again form NO_{2}).

In other words, the concentration of ozone in the atmosphere is determined by the ratio of these two species.

$\ce{NO2 + h\nu -> NO + O}, \qquad \lambda < 398~\ce{nm}$	1

$\ce{O + O2 + M -> O3 + M}$	2

$\ce{O3 + NO -> NO2 + O2}$	3

$\frac\ce{[NO2]}\ce{[NO]}=\frac{k_3 [\ce{O3}]}{j_\ce{NO2}}$	4

The symbol $\ce{M}$ represents a "third body", a molecular species that is required to carry away energy from the exothermic reaction 2. Equation 4 relates the concentrations of NO_{x} and ozone, and is known as the Leighton relationship.

The time $\tau$ that is needed to reach a steady state among NO_{x} and ozone is dominated by reaction (3), which reverses reactions (1)+(2):

$\tau = \frac{1}{k_3 [\ce{NO}]}$	5

for mixing ratio of NO, [NO] = 10 part per billion (ppb), the time constant is 40 minutes; for [NO] = 1 ppb, 4 minutes.

=== Formation of smog ===
When NO_{x} and volatile organic compounds (VOCs) react in the presence of sunlight, they form photochemical smog, a significant form of air pollution. The presence of photochemical smog increases during the summer when the incident solar radiation is higher. The emitted hydrocarbons from industrial activities and transportation react with NO_{x} quickly and increase the concentration of ozone and peroxide compounds, especially peroxyacetyl nitrate (PAN).

Children, people with lung diseases such as asthma, and people who work or exercise outside are particularly susceptible to adverse effects of smog such as damage to lung tissue and reduction in lung function.

=== Formation of nitric acid and acid rain ===
NO_{2} is further oxidized in the gas phase during daytime by reaction with OH

NO_{2} + OH (+M) → HNO_{3} (+M),

where M denotes a third molecule required to stabilize the addition product. Nitric acid (HNO_{3}) is highly soluble in liquid water in aerosol particles or cloud drops.

NO_{2} also reacts with ozone to form nitrate radical

NO_{2} + O_{3} → NO_{3} + O_{2}.

During the daytime, NO_{3} is quickly photolyzed back to NO_{2}, but at night it can react with a second NO_{2} to form dinitrogen pentoxide.

NO_{2} + NO_{3} (+M) → N_{2}O_{5} (+M).

N_{2}O_{5} reacts rapidly with liquid water (in aerosol particles or cloud drops, but not in the gas phase) to form HNO_{3},

N_{2}O_{5} + H_{2}O(liq) → 2 HNO_{3}(aq)

These are thought to be the principal pathways for formation of nitric acid in the atmosphere. This nitric acid contributes to acid rain or may deposit to soil, where it makes nitrate, which is of use to growing plants. The aqueous phase reaction

2 NO_{2} + H_{2}O → HNO_{2} + HNO_{3}

is too slow to be of any significance in the atmosphere.

== Sources ==
=== Natural sources ===
Nitric oxide is produced during thunderstorms due to the extreme heating and cooling within a lightning strike. This causes stable molecules such as N_{2} and O_{2} to convert into significant amounts of NO similar to the process that occurs during high temperature fuel combustion. NO_{x} from lightning can become oxidized to produce nitric acid (HNO_{3}), this can be precipitated out as acid rain or deposited onto particles in the air. Elevated production of NO_{x} from lightning depends on the season and geographic location. The occurrence of lightning is more common over land near the equator in the inter-tropical convergence zone (ITCZ) during summer months. This area migrates slightly as seasons change. NO_{x} production from lightning can be observed through satellite observations.

Scientists Ott et al. estimated that each flash of lightning on average in the several mid-latitude and subtropical thunderstorms studied turned 7 kg (15 lb) of nitrogen into chemically reactive NO_{x}. With 1.4 billion lightning flashes per year, multiplied by 7 kilograms per lightning strike, they estimated the total amount of NO_{x} produced by lightning per year is 8.6 million tonnes. However, NO_{x} emissions resulting from fossil fuel combustion are estimated at 28.5 million tonnes.

A recent discovery indicated that cosmic ray and solar flares can significantly influence the number of lightning strikes occurring on Earth. Therefore, space weather can be a major driving force of lightning-produced atmospheric NO_{x}. Atmospheric constituents such as nitrogen oxides can be stratified vertically in the atmosphere. Ott noted that the lightning-produced NO_{x} is typically found at altitudes greater than 5 km, while combustion and biogenic (soil) NO_{x} are typically found near the sources at near surface elevation (where it can cause the most significant health effects).

=== Biogenic sources ===
Agricultural fertilization and the use of nitrogen fixing plants also contribute to atmospheric NO_{x}, by promoting nitrogen fixation by microorganisms. The nitrification process transforms ammonia into nitrate. Denitrification is basically the reverse process of nitrification. During denitrification, nitrate is reduced to nitrite, then NO, then N_{2}O and finally nitrogen. Through these processes, NO_{x} is emitted to the atmosphere.

A recent study conducted by the University of California Davis found that adding nitrogen fertilizer to soil in California is contributing 25 percent or more to state-wide NO_{x} pollution levels. When nitrogen fertilizer is added to the soil, excess ammonium and nitrate not used by plants can be converted to NO by microorganisms in the soil, which escapes into the air. NO_{x} is a precursor for smog formation which is already a known issue for the state of California. In addition to contributing to smog, when nitrogen fertilizer is added to the soil and the excess is released in the form of NO, or leached as nitrate this can be a costly process for the farming industry.

A 2018 study by the Indiana University determined that forests in the eastern United States can expect to see increases in NO_{x} and in turn, changes in the types of trees which predominate. Due to human activity and climate change, the maples, sassafras, and tulip poplar have been pushing out the beneficial oak, beech, and hickory. The team determined that the first three tree species, maples, sassafras, and tulip poplar, are associated with ammonia-oxidizing bacteria known to "emit reactive nitrogen from soil." By contrast, the second three tree species, oak, beech and hickory, are associated with microbes that "absorb reactive nitrogen oxides," and thus can have a positive impact on the nitrogen oxide component of air quality. Nitrogen oxide release from forest soils is expected to be highest in Indiana, Illinois, Michigan, Kentucky and Ohio.

=== Industrial sources (anthropogenic sources) ===
The three primary sources of NO_{x} in combustion processes:

- thermal NO_{x}
- fuel NO_{x}
- prompt NO_{x}

Thermal NO_{x} formation, which is highly temperature dependent, is recognized as the most relevant source when combusting natural gas. Fuel NO_{x} tends to dominate during the combustion of fuels, such as coal, which have a significant nitrogen content, particularly when burned in combustors designed to minimise thermal NO_{x}. The contribution of prompt NO_{x} is normally considered negligible. A fourth source, called feed NO_{x} is associated with the combustion of nitrogen present in the feed material of cement rotary kilns, at between 300 °C and 800 °C, where it is considered a minor contributor.

==== Thermal ====
Thermal NO_{x} refers to NO_{x} formed through high temperature oxidation of the diatomic nitrogen found in combustion air. The formation rate is primarily a function of temperature and the residence time of nitrogen at that temperature. At high temperatures, usually above 1300 °C (2600 °F), molecular nitrogen (N_{2}) and oxygen (O_{2}) in the combustion air dissociate into their atomic states and participate in a series of reactions.

The three principal reactions (the extended Zel'dovich mechanism) producing thermal NO_{x} are:

N_{2} + O ⇌ NO + N
N + O_{2} ⇌ NO + O
N + OH· ⇌ NO + H·

All three reactions are reversible. Zeldovich was the first to suggest the importance of the first two reactions. The last reaction of atomic nitrogen with the hydroxyl radical, ^{•}HO, was added by Lavoie, Heywood and Keck to the mechanism and makes a significant contribution to the formation of thermal NO_{x}.

==== Fuel ====
It is estimated that transportation fuels cause 54% of the anthropogenic (i.e. human-caused) NO_{x}. The major source of NO_{x} production from nitrogen-bearing fuels such as certain coals and oil, is the conversion of fuel bound nitrogen to NO_{x} during combustion. During combustion, the nitrogen bound in the fuel is released as a free radical and ultimately forms free N_{2}, or NO. Fuel can contribute as much as 50% of total NO_{x} emissions through the combusting oil and as much as 80% through the combusting of coal

Although the complete mechanism is not fully understood, there are two primary pathways of formation. The first involves the oxidation of volatile nitrogen species during the initial stages of combustion. During the release and before the oxidation of the volatiles, nitrogen reacts to form several intermediaries which are then oxidized into NO. If the volatiles evolve into a reducing atmosphere, the nitrogen evolved can readily be made to form nitrogen gas, rather than NO_{x}. The second pathway involves the combustion of nitrogen contained in the char matrix during the combustion of the char portion of the fuels. This reaction occurs much more slowly than the volatile phase. Only around 20% of the char nitrogen is ultimately emitted as NO_{x}, since much of the NO_{x} that forms during this process is reduced to nitrogen by the char, which is nearly pure carbon.

==== Prompt ====
Nitrogen oxides are released during manufacturing of nitrogen fertilizers. Though nitrous oxide is emitted during its application, it is then reacted in atmosphere to form nitrogen oxides. This third source is attributed to the reaction of atmospheric nitrogen, N_{2}, with radicals such as C, CH, and CH_{2} fragments derived from fuel, rather than thermal or fuel processes. Occurring in the earliest stage of combustion, this results in the formation of fixed species of nitrogen such as NH (nitrogen monohydride), NCN (diradical cyanonitrene), HCN (hydrogen cyanide), ^{•}H_{2}CN (dihydrogen cyanide) and ^{•}CN (cyano radical) which can oxidize to NO. In fuels that contain nitrogen, the incidence of prompt NO_{x} is comparatively small and it is generally only of interest for the most exacting emission targets.

== Health and environment effects ==
There is strong evidence that NO_{x} respiratory exposure can trigger and exacerbate existing asthma symptoms, and may even lead to the development of asthma over longer periods of time. It has also been associated with heart disease, diabetes, birth outcomes, and all-cause mortality, but these nonrespiratory effects are less well-established.

NO_{x} reacts with ammonia, moisture, and other compounds to form nitric acid vapor and related particles.

NO_{x} reacts with volatile organic compounds in the presence of sunlight to form ozone. Ozone can cause adverse effects such as damage to lung tissue and reduction in lung function mostly in susceptible populations (children, elderly, asthmatics). Ozone can be transported by wind currents and cause health impacts far from the original sources. The American Lung Association estimates that nearly 50 percent of United States inhabitants live in counties that are not in ozone compliance. In South East England, ground level ozone pollution tends to be highest in the countryside and in suburbs, while in central London and on major roads NO emissions are able to "mop up" ozone to form NO_{2} and oxygen.

NO_{x} also readily reacts with common organic chemicals, and even ozone, to form a wide variety of toxic products: nitroarenes, nitrosamines and also the nitrate radical some of which may cause DNA mutations. Recently another pathway, via NO_{x}, to ozone has been found that predominantly occurs in coastal areas via formation of nitryl chloride when NO_{x} comes into contact with salt mist.

The direct effect of the emission of NO_{x} has positive contribution to the greenhouse effect. Instead of reacting with ozone in Reaction 3, NO can also react with HO_{2}· and organic peroxyradicals (RO_{2}·) and thus increase the concentration of ozone. Once the concentration of NO_{x} exceeds a certain level, atmospheric reactions result in net ozone formation. Since tropospheric ozone can absorb infrared radiation, this indirect effect of NO_{x} is intensifying global warming.

There are also other indirect effects of NO_{x} that can either increase or decrease the greenhouse effect. First of all, through the reaction of NO with HO_{2}· radicals, ^{•}OH radicals are recycled, which oxidize methane molecules, meaning NO_{x} emissions can counter the effect of greenhouse gases. For instance, ship traffic emits a great amount of NO_{x} which provides a source of NO_{x} over the ocean. Then, photolysis of NO_{2} leads to the formation of ozone and the further formation of hydroxyl radicals (·OH) through ozone photolysis. Since the major sink of methane in the atmosphere is by reaction with ^{•}OH radicals, the NO_{x} emissions from ship travel may lead to a net global cooling. However, NO_{x} in the atmosphere may undergo dry or wet deposition and return to land in the form of HNO_{3}/NO^{−}_{3}. Through this way, the deposition leads to nitrogen fertilization and the subsequent formation of nitrous oxide (N_{2}O) in soil, which is another greenhouse gas.

NO_{x} in the atmosphere is removed through several pathways. During daytime, NO_{2} reacts with hydroxyl radicals (·OH) and forms nitric acid (HNO_{3}), which can easily be removed by dry and wet deposition. Organic peroxyradicals (RO_{2}·) can also react with NO and NO_{2} and result in the formation of organic nitrates. These are ultimately broken down to inorganic nitrate, which is a useful nutrient for plants. During nighttime, NO_{2} and NO can form nitrous acid (HONO) through surface-catalyzed reaction. Although the reaction is relatively slow, it is an important reaction in urban areas. In addition, the nitrate radical (NO_{3}) is formed by the reaction between NO_{2} and ozone. At night, NO_{3} further reacts with NO_{2} and establishes an equilibrium reaction with dinitrogen pentoxide (N_{2}O_{5}). Via heterogeneous reaction, N_{2}O_{5} reacts with water vapor or liquid water and forms nitric acid (HNO_{3}). As mentioned above, nitric acid can be removed through wet and dry deposition and this results in the removal of NO_{x} from the atmosphere.

== Biodiesel and NO_{x} ==
Biodiesel and its blends in general are known to reduce harmful tailpipe emissions such as: carbon monoxide; particulate matter (PM), otherwise known as soot; and unburned hydrocarbon emissions. While earlier studies suggested biodiesel could sometimes decrease NO_{x} and sometimes increase NO_{x} emissions, subsequent investigation has shown that blends of up to 20% biodiesel in USEPA-approved diesel fuel have no significant impact on NO_{x} emissions compared with regular diesel. The state of California uses a special formulation of diesel fuel to produce less NO_{x} relative to diesel fuel used in the other 49 states. This has been deemed necessary by the California Air Resources Board (CARB) to offset the combination of vehicle congestion, warm temperatures, extensive sunlight, PM, and topography that all contribute to the formation of ozone and smog. CARB has established a special regulation for Alternative Diesel Fuels to ensure that any new fuels, including biodiesel, coming into the market do not substantially increase NO_{x} emissions. The reduction of NO_{x} emissions is one of the most important challenges for advances in vehicle technology. While diesel vehicles sold in the US since 2010 are dramatically cleaner than previous diesel vehicles, urban areas continue to seek more ways to reduce the formation of smog and ozone. NO_{x} formation during combustion is associated with a number of factors such as combustion temperature. As such, it can be observed that the vehicle drive cycle, or the load on the engine have more significant impact on NO_{x} emissions than the type of fuel used. This may be especially true for modern, clean diesel vehicles that continuously monitor engine operation electronically and actively control engine parameters and exhaust system operations to limit NO_{x} emission to less than 0.2 g/km. Low-temperature combustion or LTC technology may help reduce thermal formation of NO_{x} during combustion, however a tradeoff exists as high temperature combustion produces less PM or soot and results in greater power and fuel efficiency.

== Regulation and emission control technologies ==
Selective catalytic reduction (SCR) and selective non-catalytic reduction (SNCR) reduce post combustion NO_{x} by reacting the exhaust with urea or ammonia to produce nitrogen and water. SCR is now being used in ships, diesel trucks and in some diesel cars. The use of exhaust gas recirculation and catalytic converters in motor vehicle engines have significantly reduced vehicular emissions. NO_{x} was the main focus of the Volkswagen emissions violations.

Other technologies such as flameless oxidation (FLOX) and staged combustion significantly reduce thermal NO_{x} in industrial processes. Bowin low NO_{x} technology is a hybrid of staged-premixed-radiant combustion technology with major surface combustion preceded by minor radiant combustion. In the Bowin burner, air and fuel gas are premixed at a ratio greater than or equal to the stoichiometric combustion requirement. Water Injection technology, whereby water is introduced into the combustion chamber, is also becoming an important means of NO_{x} reduction through increased efficiency in the overall combustion process. Alternatively, the water (e.g. 10 to 50%) is emulsified into the fuel oil before the injection and combustion. This emulsification can either be made in-line (unstabilized) just before the injection or as a drop-in fuel with chemical additives for long-term emulsion stability (stabilized). Excessive water addition facilitates hot corrosion, which is the primary reason why dry low-NO_{x} technologies are favored today despite their greater complexity.

== See also ==
- Dinitrogen trioxide
- Energy poverty and cooking
- Air pollution
