= Floxx =

Digital media agency based in London

- Founded: London, United Kingdom
- Predecessor: FitFinder (defunct)
- Headquarters: London, United Kingdom
- Area served: Worldwide
- Founder: Rich Martell
- Industry: Mobile applicationa
- Products: FitFinder; MapChat; Spottd
- Website: floxx.io
- Launched: 2011; 15 years ago

Floxx was a digital media agency founded in 2011 and based in London, United Kingdom. The company specialised in producing mobile apps, and was named as one of the "Red Bull Future 50" companies by Real Business magazine. In 2013, Floxx started working with Barclays and The Duke of York on a series of various mobile applications.

== History ==
Floxx was founded in January 2011 shortly after Rich Martell left University College London following the fallout of his viral student website, FitFinder. Late in 2010, Floxx received a £100,000 seed investment from UK Dragons Den investor Doug Richard and Silicon Valley's Kevin Wall. At the time of its launch, the company was based around the so-called Silicon Roundabout but moved to allow for expansion in 2012. In 2014, Floxx opened an office in Covent Garden, London.

== FitFinder ==
Floxx was set up following the viral expansion of FitFinder while he was still an undergraduate student at University College London. FitFinder is based on the concept of anonymously posting both location and description of an attractive person whom one has spotted; this post is then immediately placed on the 'FitFeed', where it can be viewed by anyone.

== Hackathons ==
Floxx are well known for their hackathon culture. The 2011 Hackathon took place on 15th Dec 2011 and was live streamed to over 50 countries. For 24 hours the team worked to think up, design and build a product in 24 hours. The following week they unveiled that they had created the website desertislanddiscs.co.uk (inspired by the BBC radio show) which allowed users to log on and choose their own Desert Island Discs.
