= Pipe Creek (Wabash River tributary) =

Stream in Indiana, U.S.

Coordinates: 40°44′44″N 86°13′15″W

Pipe Creek is a stream in the U.S. state of Indiana. It is a tributary of the Wabash River.

Pipe Creek is the English translation of the native Miami-Illinois language name.

== See also ==
- List of rivers of Indiana
