= Converse-Jackson Township Public Library =

- U.S. National Register of Historic Places
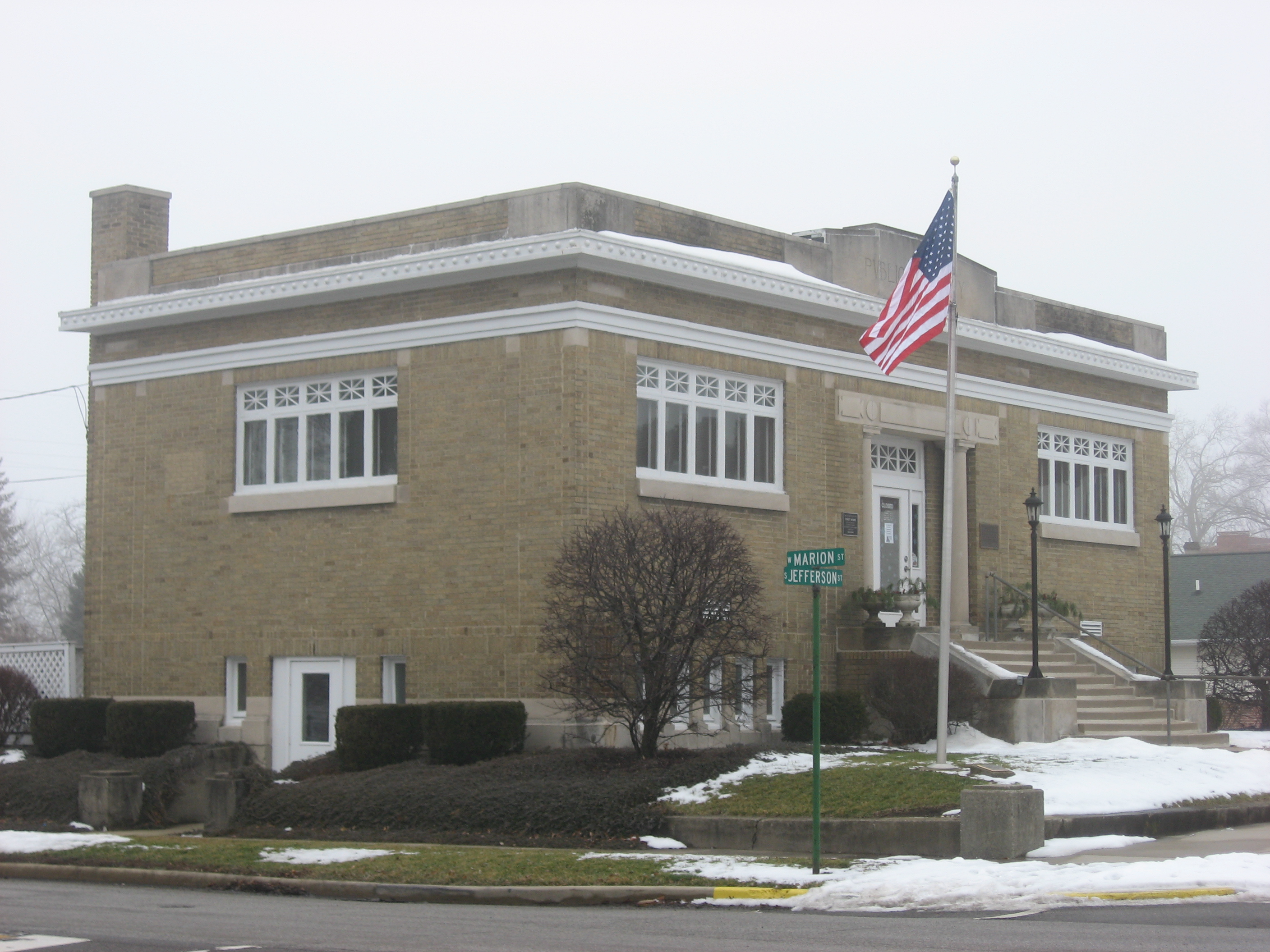
- Converse-Jackson Township Public Library, January 2010

- Location within Indiana Location within the United States
- Location: 100 S. Jefferson St., Converse, Indiana
- Coordinates: 40°34′39″N 85°52′26″W
- Area: less than one acre
- Built: 1918
- Architect: Bowstead, H.G.
- Architectural style: Classical Revival
- NRHP reference No.: 99000298
- Added to NRHP: March 12, 1999

Converse-Jackson Township Public Library is a historic Carnegie library building located at Converse, Indiana. It was built in 1918, as a one-story, Classical Revival style brick and masonry building on a raised basement. It has a low-sloped roof surrounded by a parapet and features an entry flanked by two Doric order limestone columns. It was built with a $9,000 grant from the Carnegie Foundation.

It was listed on the National Register of Historic Places in 1999. The Converse-Jackson Township Public Library remains in operation as one of two active public libraries in Miami County. The current library director is Purdue University graduate Andrew Horner of nearby Amboy.
