= Jackson Township, Miami County, Indiana =

Jackson Township
- Township
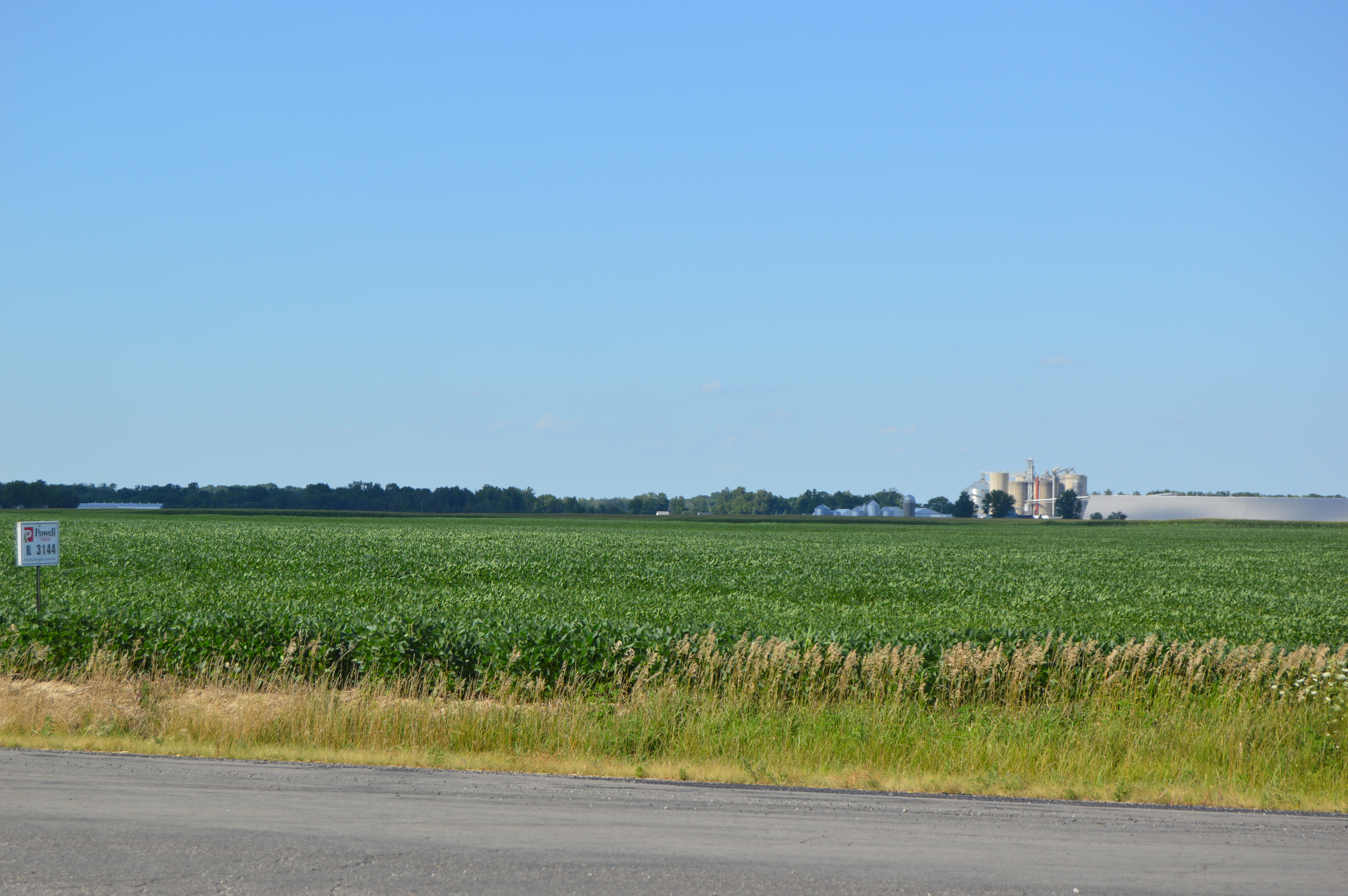
- Fields south of Amboy

- Location in Miami County
- Coordinates: 40°36′14″N 85°54′13″W
- Country: United States
- State: Indiana
- County: Miami
- Organized: 1846
- Named for: Andrew Jackson

Government
  - Type: Indiana township

Area
  - Total: 23.37 sq mi (60.5 km^{2})
  - Land: 23.3 sq mi (60 km^{2})
  - Water: 0.08 sq mi (0.21 km^{2}) 0.34%
- Elevation: 814 ft (248 m)

Population (2020)
  - Total: 1,966
  - Density: 84/sq mi (32/km^{2})
- Time zone: UTC-5 (Eastern (EST))
  - Summer (DST): UTC-4 (EDT)
- ZIP codes: 46911, 46919
- GNIS feature ID: 453455

Jackson Township is one of fourteen townships in Miami County, Indiana, United States. As of the 2020 census, the town's population is 1,966 and it contained 843 housing units as of 2010.

== History ==
The first settlement at Jackson Township was made in 1842. Jackson Township was organized in 1846. The township is named for Andrew Jackson, seventh President of the United States.

== Geography ==
According to the 2010 census, the township has a total area of 23.37 square miles (60.5 km^{2}), of which 23.3 square miles (60 km^{2}) (or 99.70%) is land and 0.08 square miles (0.21 km^{2}) (or 0.34%) is water.

=== Cities, towns, villages ===
- Amboy
- Converse (partial)

=== Cemeteries ===
The township contains four cemeteries: Bond, Friends, Park Lawn and Pipe Creek.

=== Major highways ===
- Indiana State Road 18
- Indiana State Road 19

=== Airports and landing strips ===
- Converse Airport

=== Lakes ===
- Fox Lake

== Education ==
- Oak Hill United School Corporation

Jackson Township residents may obtain a free library card from the Converse-Jackson Township Public Library in Converse.

== Political districts ==
- Indiana's 5th congressional district
- State House District 32
- State Senate District 18
