= Swayzee, Indiana =

- Town
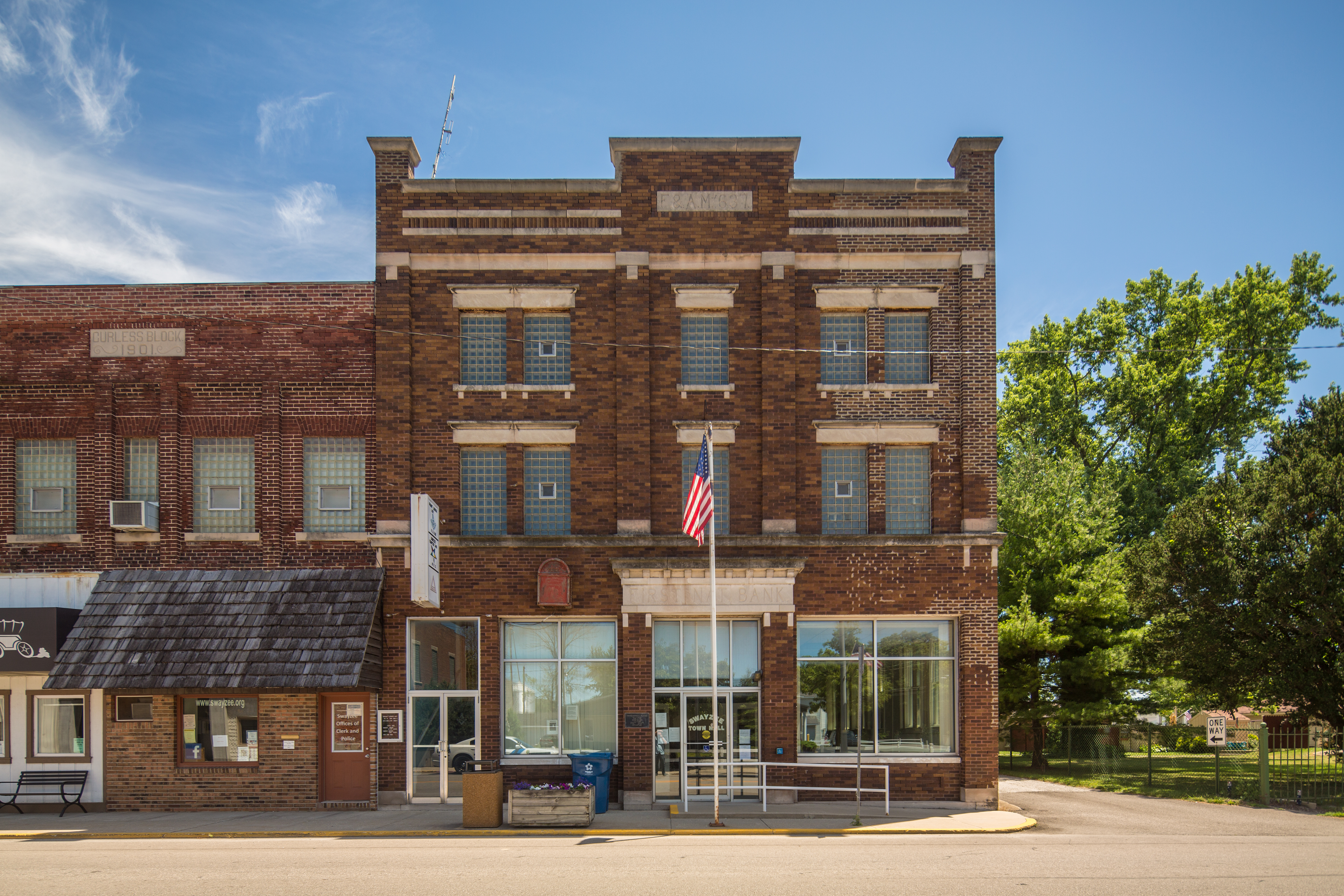
- Swayzee Town Hall

- Logo

- Location of Swayzee in Grant County, Indiana.
- Coordinates: 40°30′18″N 85°49′35″W
- Country: United States
- State: Indiana
- County: Grant
- Township: Sims

Area
  - Total: 0.47 sq mi (1.21 km^{2})
  - Land: 0.47 sq mi (1.21 km^{2})
  - Water: 0 sq mi (0.00 km^{2})
- Elevation: 866 ft (264 m)

Population (2020)
  - Total: 918
  - Estimate (2025): 900 ▼
  - Density: 1,959.0/sq mi (756.36/km^{2})
- Time zone: UTC-5 (Eastern (EST))
  - Summer (DST): UTC-4 (EDT)
- ZIP code: 46986
- Area code: 765
- FIPS code: 18-74510
- GNIS feature ID: 2397690
- Website: www.in.gov/towns/swayzee/

Swayzee is a town in Sims Township, Grant County, Indiana, United States. The population was 918 at the 2020 census.

On its welcome sign, Swayzee claims to be "the only Swayzee in the world." This motto is based on a story about a postcard sent by a serviceman overseas during World War II, which although being addressed only to "Swayzee", with no mention of Indiana or any other information, was still said to have been successfully delivered.

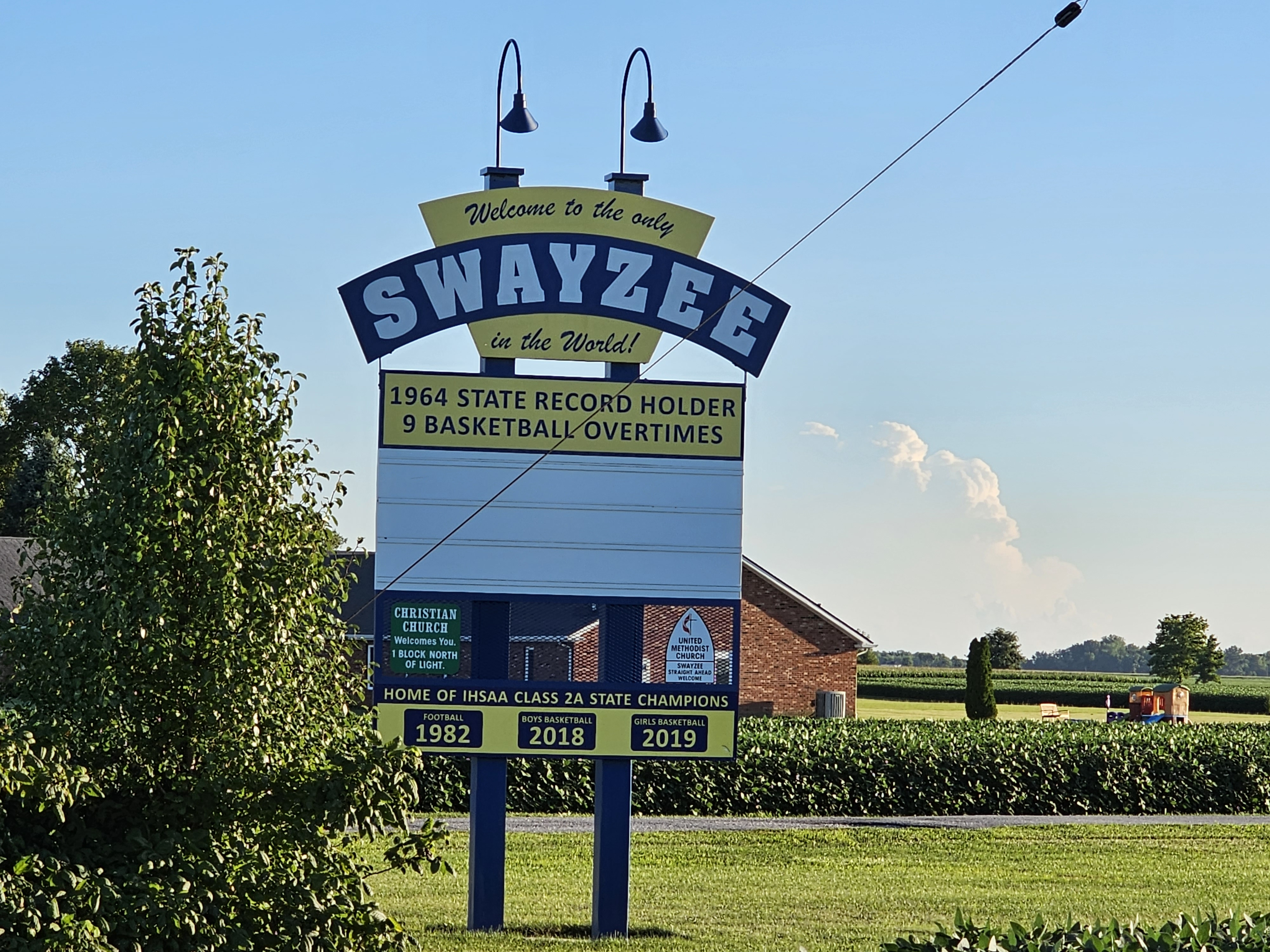
Sign welcoming people to "The Only Swayzee in the World" and noting the local high school's basketball achievements

== History ==
James Swayzee was the original owner of the town site.

Pipe Creek Sinkhole, uncovered in 1996 at the Pipe Creek Junior limestone quarry near Swayzee, has been the site of important paleontological discoveries dating from the Pliocene epoch.

== Geography ==
Swayzee is located approximately eight miles west of the city of Marion. State Road 13 passes north and south through town along Washington Street, and State Road 22/Route 35 runs east and west about two & half mile south of town.

According to the 2010 census, Swayzee has a total area of 0.47 square miles (1.22 km^{2}), all land.

== Demographics ==
Historical population
Census	Pop.	Note	%±
1900	1,162		—
1910	836		−28.1%
1920	650		−22.2%
1930	604		−7.1%
1940	661		9.4%
1950	690		4.4%
1960	863		25.1%
1970	1,073		24.3%
1980	1,127		5.0%
1990	1,059		−6.0%
2000	1,011		−4.5%
2010	981		−3.0%
2020	918		−6.4%
2025 (est.)	900	▼	−2.0%
U.S. Decennial Census

Swayzee is home to churches of three Christian denominations: United Methodist, Nazarene, and United Church of Christ.

=== 2010 census ===
As of the census of 2010, there were 981 people, 393 households, and 289 families residing in the town. The population density was 2,087.2 inhabitants per square mile (805.9/km^{2}). There were 426 housing units at an average density of 906.4 per square mile (350.0/km^{2}). The racial makeup of the town was 97.7% White, 0.3% African American, 0.3% Native American, 0.1% Asian, 0.2% from other races, and 1.4% from two or more races. Hispanic or Latino of any race were 1.3% of the population.

There were 393 households, of which 33.1% had children under the age of 18 living with them, 57.0% were married couples living together, 12.5% had a female householder with no husband present, 4.1% had a male householder with no wife present, and 26.5% were non-families. 23.9% of all households were made up of individuals, and 13% had someone living alone who was 65 years of age or older. The average household size was 2.50 and the average family size was 2.92.

The median age in the town was 40 years. 25.8% of residents were under the age of 18; 7.7% were between the ages of 18 and 24; 23.6% were from 25 to 44; 26.3% were from 45 to 64; and 16.3% were 65 years of age or older. The gender makeup of the town was 48.6% male and 51.4% female.

=== 2000 census ===
As of the census of 2000, there were 1,011 people, 404 households, and 309 families residing in the town. The population density was 2,141.5 inhabitants per square mile (826.8/km^{2}). There were 414 housing units at an average density of 876.9 per square mile (338.6/km^{2}). The racial makeup of the town was 97.73% White, 0.40% African American, 0.10% Pacific Islander, 1.19% from other races, and 0.59% from two or more races. Hispanic or Latino of any race were 1.48% of the population.

There were 404 households, out of which 34.4% had children under the age of 18 living with them, 62.6% were married couples living together, 10.1% had a female householder with no husband present, and 23.3% were non-families. 21.5% of all households were made up of individuals, and 9.4% had someone living alone who was 65 years of age or older. The average household size was 2.50 and the average family size was 2.89.

In the town, the population was spread out, with 25.4% under the age of 18, 6.9% from 18 to 24, 28.4% from 25 to 44, 23.6% from 45 to 64, and 15.6% who were 65 years of age or older. The median age was 38 years. For every 100 females, there were 92.2 males. For every 100 females age 18 and over, there were 88.0 males.

The median income for a household in the town was $41,146, and the median income for a family was $46,750. Males had a median income of $34,531 versus $22,361 for females. The per capita income for the town was $17,476. About 4.2% of families and 6.0% of the population were below the poverty line, including 5.5% of those under age 18 and 1.6% of those age 65 or over.

== Education ==
Swayzee Elementary School, located along Washington Street, is administered by the Oak Hill United School Corporation.

Swayzee is the state record-holder for the most overtimes in a basketball game, with nine overtimes during a March 15, 1964, game at the Marion Regional against Liberty Center. Swayzee won, 65–61. The record is noted on the town's welcome sign.

The town has a lending library, the Swayzee Public Library.

== Notable person ==
- Joni T. Johnson, painter
