= White River Conference =

Former high school athletic conference in Indiana, USA

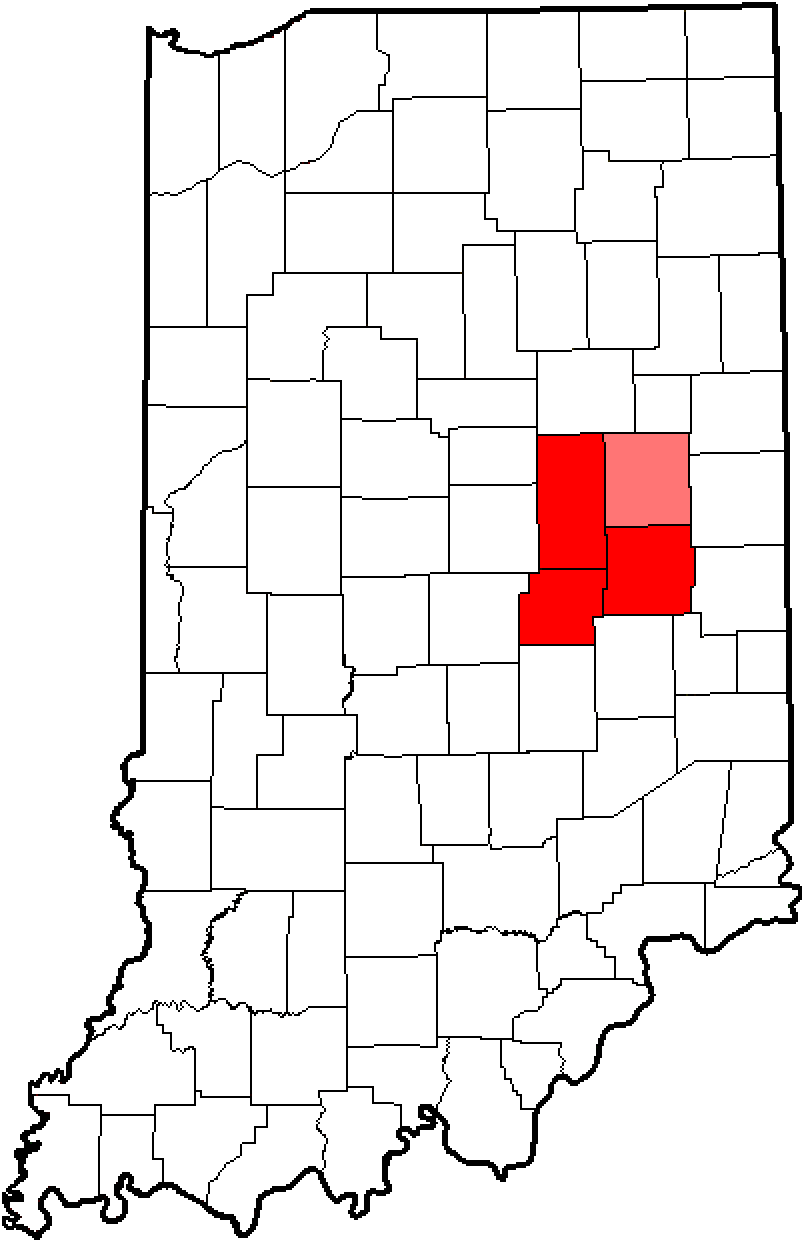
The White River Conference (1989–2010) in Indiana. The last school from Delaware County left two years before the conference disbanded.

The White River Conference was an Indiana High School Athletic Association (IHSAA)–sanctioned conference located within rural areas of East Central Indiana, that existed twice, once from 1954 to 1977, and from 1989 to 2010. The first version of the conference was founded as a home for high schools in Madison County who weren't in the Central Indiana Athletic Conference. The conference would expand quickly from six to nine schools, as two new high schools in Anderson and Middletown, a school in Henry County, were added within two years. Membership was generally not stable until 1969, as Madison Heights left, Highland was forced out and eventually added back into the conference, St. Mary's closed, member schools consolidated, and schools from neighboring Delaware and Hancock counties were added. Eventually, large disparities in enrollment causing the conference to disband, as city and consolidated schools outgrew their rural counterparts.. Schools would move into the Big Blue River Conference, Classic Athletic Conference, and Mid-Eastern Conference.

The conference was refounded in 1989, with virtually the same lineup as 1977. Pendleton Heights and Yorktown had been independent since the demise of the CAC, and Mount Vernon had been independent since the original WRC folded. Lapel and Shenandoah were left without a home with the breakup of the BBRC, while Frankton and Wes-Del were eager to join a conference that sponsored football (they played independently since the MEC does not sponsor the sport). Anderson Highland was the only member who did not rejoin, as their move to the Olympic Conference caused the demise of the CAC. Delta, another former CAC school, would take their place in the reformed conference, and divisions in football were introduced to address enrollment disparity.

This lineup would remain intact until 1995, though a massive change would happen in the next three years as five schools left. Delta, Mount Vernon, and Pendleton Heights would all leave for the Hoosier Heritage Conference, while Yorktown would join the Rangeline Conference before also ending up in the HHC. Frankton would join the more geographically compact Central Indiana Athletic Conference in 1998, joining fellow northern Madison County schools Alexandria and Elwood. The WRC countered by adding two former BBRC schools: Knightstown (1995) and Eastern Hancock (1997). While the number of members in the conference shrank, its five members were of similar size and demographic. The conference remained stable for the next decade.

The end of the conference began when Wes-Del left after the 2007–08 academic year to rejoin the MEC. Lapel then joined the Indiana Crossroads Conference in 2009–10, playing in both conferences for the season before becoming a full member of the ICC for 2010–11. The three remaining schools afterward became independents. Eastern Hancock and Knightstown would join the Mid-Hoosier Conference and its football arm, the Mid-Indiana Football Conference, after being independent for a few years. The schools have since left and joined the Mid-Eastern Conference (where Shenandoah will join them, having been independent since the demise of the WRC) and Tri-Eastern Conference, respectively, in 2017. Lapel struggled to compete in the ICRC, and left that conference in 2014, playing independently since then.

== Former membership (1989–2010) ==
School	Location	Mascot	Colors	IHSAA Class	County	Year joined	Previous conference	Year left	Conference joined
Delta	Muncie	Eagles		AAA	18; Delaware	1989	Independents (CAC 1986)	1997	Hoosier Heritage
Frankton	Frankton	Eagles		AA	48; Madison	1989	Mid-Eastern	1998	Central Indiana
Lapel^{1}	Lapel	Bulldogs		A	48; Madison	1989	Big Blue River	2010	Indiana Crossroads
Mount Vernon	Fortville	Marauders		AAA	30; Hancock	1989	Independents (WRC 1977)	1995	Hoosier Heritage
Pendleton; Heights	Pendleton	Arabians		AAAA	48; Madison	1989	Independents (CAC 1986)	1997	Hoosier Heritage
Shenandoah	Middletown	Raiders		AA	33; Henry	1989	Big Blue River	2010	Independents (MEC 2017)
Wes-Del	Gaston	Warriors		A	18; Delaware	1989	Mid-Eastern	2008	Mid-Eastern
Yorktown	Yorktown	Tigers		AAA	18; Delaware	1989	Independents (CAC 1986)	1997	Rangeline (now in Hoosier Heritage)
Knightstown	Knightstown	Panthers		AA	33; Henry	1995	Independents (BBRC 1989)	2010	Independents (MHC 2013)
Eastern; Hancock	Charlottesville	Royals		A	30; Hancock	1997	Independents (BBRC 1989)	2010	Independents (MHC 2012)

1. Lapel played the 2009–10 season concurrently in the WRC and ICRC.

=== Football divisions 1989–1995 ===
Upper	Lower
Delta	Frankton
Mount Vernon	Lapel
Pendleton; Heights	Shenandoah
Yorktown	Wes-Del

== Former membership (1954–1977) ==
School	Location	Mascot	Colors	County	Year joined	Previous conference	Year left	Conference joined
Frankton	Frankton	Eagles		48; Madison	1954	Independents	1977	Mid-Eastern
Lapel	Lapel	Bulldogs		48; Madison	1954	Independents	1977	Big Blue River
Markleville	Markleville	Arabians		48; Madison	1954	Independents	1969	none (consolidated into Pendleton Heights)
Pendleton	Pendleton	Irish		48; Madison	1954	Independents	1969	none (consolidated into Pendleton Heights)
St. Mary's	Anderson	Gaels		48; Madison	1954	Independents	1966	none (school closed)
Summitville	Summitville	Goblins		48; Madison	1954	Independents	1969	none (consolidated into Madison-Grant)
Anderson Highland	Anderson	Scots		48; Madison	1955; 1969	none (new school); Mississinewa Valley	1963; 1977	Mississinewa Valley; Classic
Middletown	Middletown	Cossacks		33; Henry	1955	East Central	1967	none (consolidated into Shenandoah)
Madison Heights	Anderson	Pirates		48; Madison	1956	none (new school)	1959	Independents
Yorktown	Yorktown	Tigers		18; Delaware	1963	Delaware County	1977	Classic
Shenandoah	Middletown	Raiders		33; Henry	1967	none (new school)	1977	Big Blue River
Mount Vernon	Fortville	Marauders		30; Hancock	1968	East Central	1977	Independents
Pendleton; Heights	Pendleton	Arabians		48; Madison	1969	none (new school)	1977	Classic
Wes-Del^{1}	Gaston	Warriors		18; Delaware	1969	Mississinewa Valley	1977	Mid-Eastern

1. Wes-Del played concurrently in the WRC and MVC for its entire duration in the first incarnation of the WRC.

== Resources ==
- IHSAA Conferences
- IHSAA Directory
