= Mississinewa Valley Conference =

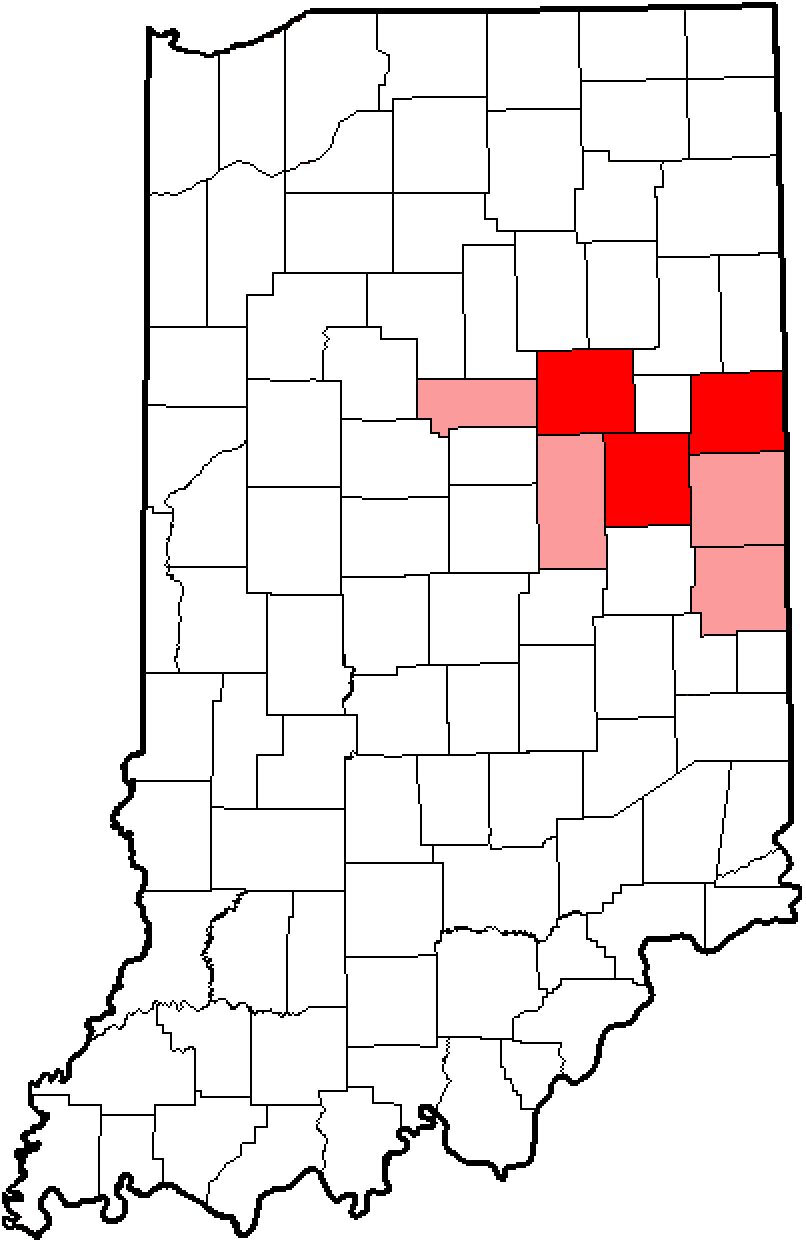
The Mississinewa Valley Conference in Indiana. Counties in red contained schools at the time of disbanding, counties in pink contained former member schools who left before conference folded.

The Mississinewa Valley Conference was an IHSAA-sanctioned conference based in East Central Indiana that lasted between 1952 and 1977. The conference started out as a conference for larger rural schools as a way to provide a higher level of competition than their respective County Conferences typically provided. The conference was stable for its first decade, but consolidation and more regionally based conferences with schools of similar sizes had schools defecting the MVC. The conference ended in 1977, with three schools forming the Classic Athletic Conference, and one team each joining the Mid-Eastern and Mid-Indiana conferences.

== Former members ==
School	Location	Mascot	Colors	County	Year joined	Previous conference	Year left	Conference joined
Eastern (Greentown)^{1}	Greentown	Comets		34; Howard	1952	Tri-County	1965	Mid-Indiana
Fairmount^{2}	Fairmount	Quakers		27; Grant	1952	Grant County	1965	Mid-Indiana
Mississinewa^{2}	Gas City	Indians		27; Grant	1952	Grant County	1977	Classic
Portland^{3}	Portland	Panthers		38; Jay	1952	Jay County	1975	none (consolidated into Jay County)
Royerton	Royerton	Redbirds		18; Delaware	1952	Delaware	1967	none (consolidated into Delta)
Winchester^{4}	Winchester	Golden Falcons^{5}		68; Randolph	1952	Randolph County	1972	Tri-Eastern
Hagerstown	Hagerstown	Tigers		89; Wayne	1962	Eastern Indiana	1966	Tri-Eastern
Anderson Highland	Anderson	Scots		48; Madison	1963	White River	1969	White River
Eastbrook	Marion	Panthers		27; Grant	1965	none (new school)	1977	Mid-Indiana
Wes-Del^{6}	Gaston	Warriors		18; Delaware	1966	none (new school)	1977	Mid-Eastern
Delta	Muncie	Eagles		18; Delaware	1967	none (new school)	1977	Classic
Jay County	Portland	Patriots		38; Jay	1975	none (new school)	1977	Classic

1. Eastern played in both the MVC and TCC from 1953 until 1965.
2. Played concurrently in MVC and GCC 1952–65.
3. Portland played concurrently in the Jay County Conference and MVC 1952–54.
4. Known as Driver 1959–66.
5. Team name was Yellow Jackets before 1959.
6. Wes-Del played concurrently in the MVC and the White River Conference from 1969 to 1977.
