= Classic Athletic Conference =

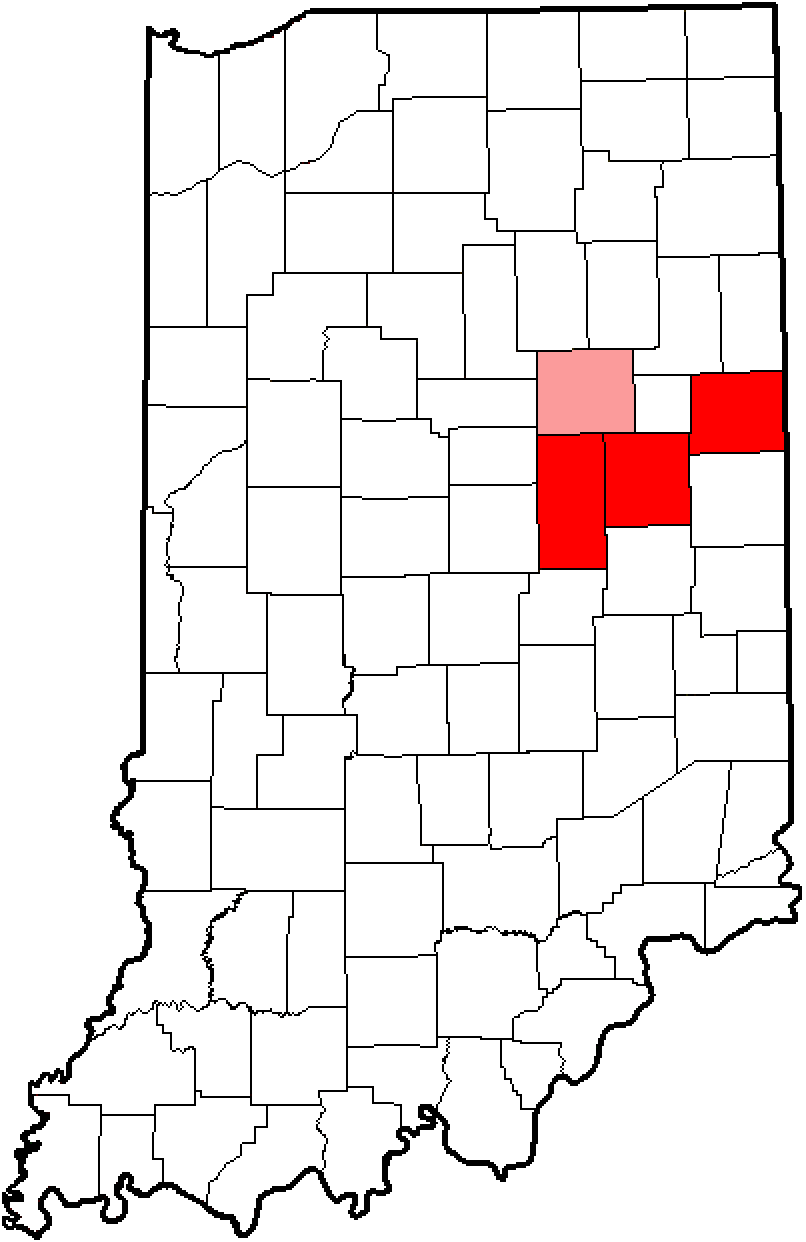
The Classic Athletic Conference in Indiana. Grant County is in pink because its only representative left in 1979.

The Classic Athletic Conference was a short-lived IHSAA-sanctioned conference based in northern East Central Indiana. Formed by the largest schools in their predecessor conferences, the conference only lasted nine years before disbanding

== History ==
The conference began in 1977, as schools from both the Mississinewa Valley Conference and White River Conference joined. This move was spurred by the then-new class football playoff system, where larger schools were awarded fewer points for playing small schools, hurting their chances of a playoff spot. Both conferences had large enrollment disparities, which did not benefit the larger schools. This prompted three schools from each conference to start their own conference. This would cause the end of both existing conferences. The MVC was only a five-member conference at this point, and the a plan for the five remaining WRC schools to join with three schools from the Big Blue River and Mid-Eastern conferences fell through, so the seven schools ended up having to fend for themselves.

The newly formed conference only lasted in its original format for two years, as Mississinewa left for the more geographically compact Central Indiana Athletic Conference. The remaining five schools continued their tenuous alliance, although the same reason the conference formed (attendance disparities) plagued it through the rest of its existence. Anderson Highland and Jay County remained large schools, while their counterparts' numbers had either stagnated or declined. The end finally came in 1986, when the two aforementioned schools joined the Olympic Conference, which not only had more similar-sized schools, but also featured similar demographics at that point (second/third schools in large cities and mid-sized city schools). Delta, Pendleton Heights, and Yorktown became independents, but worked towards resurrecting the WRC, which was achieved in 1989. The same three schools now play in the Hoosier Heritage Conference.

== Former members ==
School	Location	Mascot	Colors	County	Year joined	Previous conference	Year left	Conference joined
Anderson Highland	Anderson	Scots		48; Madison	1977	White River	1986	Olympic
Delta	Muncie	Eagles		18; Delaware	1977	Mississinewa Valley	1986	Independents (WRC 1989)
Jay County	Portland	Patriots		38; Jay	1977	Mississinewa Valley	1986	Olympic
Mississinewa	Gas City	Indians		27; Grant	1977	Mississinewa Valley	1979	Central Indiana
Pendleton; Heights	Pendleton	Arabians		30; Madison	1977	White River	1986	Independents (WRC 1989)
Yorktown	Yorktown	Tigers		18; Delaware	1977	White River	1986	Independents (WRC 1989)
