= Rangeline Conference =

The Rangeline Conference was an IHSAA-Sanctioned High School Athletic Conference that lasted from 1965 to 1999, containing schools in Boone, Clinton, Delaware, Hamilton, Hancock, Hendricks, Howard, Marion, Shelby, and Tipton Counties in Central Indiana at various points, though never having more than five counties represented at one time, and the largest membership at once being eight schools.

The conference began as the Mid-Capital Conference in 1965, following the breakup of the Hamilton County Conference due to consolidation. The six school loop was down to four by 1970, but expanded to 7 by 1972 and rebranded itself as the Rangeline, since its footprint was no longer confined to the northern suburbs of Indianapolis. While the conference was stable at 8 schools from 1975 to 1989, size differences and geography plagued Rangeline for its remaining 11 years, until its demise in 2000.

== Membership ==
School	Location	Mascot	Colors	County	Year joined	Previous conference	Year left	Conference joined
Avon	Avon	Orioles		32; Hendricks	1965	Independents	1970	West Central
Hamilton; Heights	Arcadia	Huskies		29; Hamilton	1965	none (new school)	2000	Mid-Indiana
Hamilton; Southeastern^{1}	Fishers	Royals		29; Hamilton	1965; 1972	Hamilton County; Big Blue River	1969; 1995	Big Blue River; Hoosier Heritage
Sharpsville-Prairie	Sharpsville	Bulldogs		80; Tipton	1965	Independents (TCC 1964)	1970	none (consolidated into Tri-Central)
Sheridan	Sheridan	Blackhawks		29; Hamilton	1965	Hamilton County	2000	Hoosier
Westfield	Westfield	Shamrocks		29; Hamilton	1965	Hamilton County	2000	Hoosier Crossroads
Tri-Central	Sharpsville	Trojans		80; Tipton	1970	none (new school)	1989	Hoosier Heartland
Taylor	Center	Titans		34; Howard	1972	Independents (new school 1967)	1974	Mid-Indiana
Zionsville	Zionsville	Eagles		06; Boone	1972	Independents (BCC 1964)	2000	Hoosier Crossroads
Clinton; Central	Michigantown	Bulldogs		12; Clinton	1975	Mid-Central	1989	Hoosier Heartland
Clinton; Prairie	Frankfort	Gophers		12; Clinton	1975	Mid-Central	1989	Hoosier Heartland
New; Palestine	New Palestine	Dragons		30; Hancock	1989	Big Blue River	1995	Hoosier Heritage
Triton; Central	Fairland	Tigers		73; Shelby	1989	Big Blue River	1995	Mid-Hoosier
Scecina Memorial	Indianapolis	Crusaders		49; Marion	1995	Independents	2000	Independents
Yorktown	Yorktown	Tigers		18; Delaware	1997	White River	1999	Hoosier Heritage
Tipton	Tipton	Blue Devils		80; Tipton	1998	Central Indiana	2000	Hoosier

1. Hamilton Southeastern opened as a renaming of Fishers in 1965, since no schools consolidated with FHS, despite the new mascot and colors. Eventually a new Fishers High School would split from HSEHS, reviving the old FHS mascot and colors.

== Resources ==
Rangeline Conference Lifespan
