= Central Indiana Athletic Conference =

Central Indiana Conference
- Region: Indiana

Locations
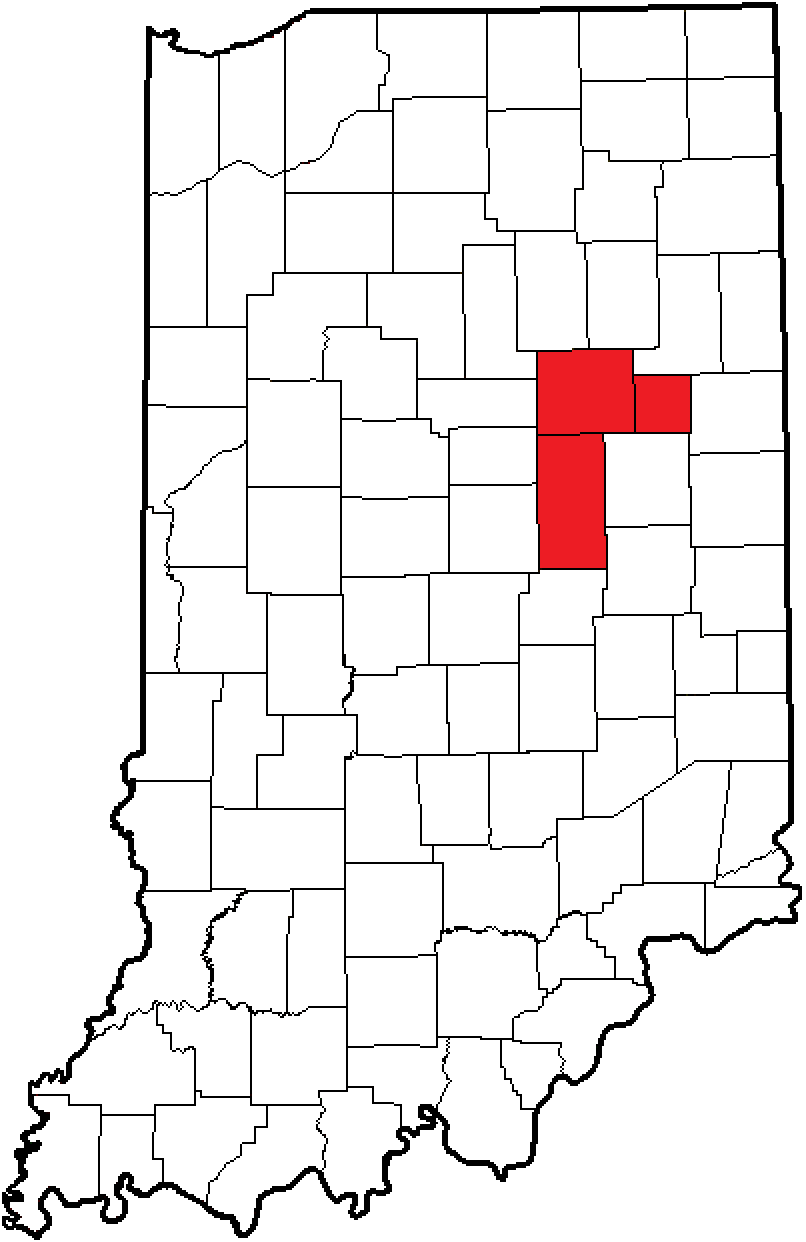

Central Indiana Conference is an eight-member IHSAA Conference spanning Blackford, Grant, and Madison Counties.

== Membership ==
School	Location	Mascot	Colors	County	Enrollment 24–25	IHSAA Class / Football / Soccer	Year joined	Previous conference
Alexandria Monroe	Alexandria	Tigers		48; Madison	468	2A / 2A / -	1932	Independents
Blackford	Hartford City	Bruins		05; Blackford	490	2A / 2A / 2A	1968	none (new school)
Eastbrook	Marion	Panthers		27; Grant	501	2A / 2A / 2A	1998	Mid-Indiana
Elwood Community	Elwood	Panthers		48; Madison	410	2A / 2A / -	1932	Independents
Frankton	Frankton	Eagles		48; Madison	531	2A / 3A / -	1998	White River
Madison-Grant*	Fairmount	Argylls		27; Grant	336	2A / 1A / -	1969	none (new school)
Mississinewa	Gas City	Indians		27; Grant	783	3A / 3A / 2A	1979	Classic
Oak Hill*	Converse	Golden Eagles		27; Grant	538	2A / 3A / 2A	2006	Three Rivers

- Madison-Grant's school district also covers part of Madison County. Oak Hill's district likewise covers part of Miami County. The town of Converse is actually in Miami County, though the physical school building is in Grant County but is addressed to Converse.

=== Former members ===
School	Location	Mascot	Colors	County	Year joined	Previous conference	Year left	Conference joined
Huntington North^{1}	Huntington	Vikings		35; Huntington	1932	NE Indiana	1974	Olympic
Noblesville	Noblesville	Millers		29; Hamilton	1932	Hamilton County	1939	Hamilton County
Peru	Peru	Tigers		52; Miami	1932	Miami County	1998	Mid-Indiana
Rochester	Rochester	Zebras		25; Fulton	1932	North Central	1963	Northern Lakes
Tipton	Tipton	Blue Devils		80; Tipton	1932	Tipton County	1998	Rangeline
Wabash	Wabash	Apaches		85; Wabash	1932	Wabash County	2006	Three Rivers
Windfall	Windfall	Dragons		80; Tipton	1932	Tipton County	1936	Tipton County
Warsaw	Warsaw	Tigers		43; Kosciusko	1933; 1953	Independents; Northeastern IN	1945; 1963	Northeastern IN; Northern Lakes
Plymouth	Plymouth	Pilgrims		50; Marshall	1935	Marshall County	1963	Northern Lakes
Muncie Burris	Muncie	Owls		18; Delaware	1938	Independents	1979	Mid-Eastern
Hartford City^{2}	Hartford City	Airedales		05; Blackford	1945	Blackford County	1969	none (consolidated into Blackford)
Monticello	Monticello	Tioga Indians		91; White	1945	White County	1963	none (consolidated into Twin Lakes)
South Side^{3}	Fort Wayne	Archers		02; Allen	1945	Fort Wayne City	1947	Fort Wayne City

1. Huntington North was known as Huntington before 1966.
2. Played concurrently in BCC and CIAC 1945–53.
3. Played concurrently in the CIAC and FWCS 1945–47.

== Sponsored Sports ==
Boys	Girls
Baseball	Basketball
Basketball	Cross Country
Cross Country	Golf
Football	Soccer
Golf	Softball
Soccer	Swimming
Swimming	Tennis
Tennis	Track & Field
Track & Field	Volleyball
Wrestling	

== Conference championships ==
=== Football ===
#	Team	Seasons
22	Tipton	1953*, 1958, 1962*, 1964, 1967, 1968, 1969, 1972, 1974*, 1977, 1984, 1985*, 1986, 1987, 1989, 1990, 1991, 1992*, 1993, 1994*, 1995*, 1997
16	Eastbrook	1998*, 1999, 2001, 2002, 2004, 2005*, 2007, 2009, 2010, 2013, 2015, 2017, 2019, 2020, 2021, 2025
10	Peru	1936, 1937, 1952, 1960, 1962, 1975, 1976, 1978, 1982, 1995*
8	Elwood	1956, 1957, 1985*, 1988, 1992*, 1994*, 2000, 2012
7	Mississinewa	1983, 1984*, 2016, 2018, 2023, 2024, 2026
6	Madison-Grant	1994*, 1995*, 1996, 2003, 2005*, 2011
5	Blackford	1973, 1974*, 1979, 1980, 1983
4	Alexandria-Monroe	1962*, 1980*, 1981, 2014*
4	Plymouth	1947, 1949, 1950*, 1955
4	Oak Hill	2006, 2008, 2014*, 2022
3	Wabash	1934, 1935, 1951
2	Huntington North	1946, 1959
1	Frankton	1998*
1	Hartford City	1950*
1	Rochester	1953*
0	Burris	
0	Monticello	
0	Noblesville	
0	South Side (FW)	
0	Warsaw	

=== Boys basketball ===
#	Team	Seasons
10	Oak Hill	2007, 2008, 2009, 2011*, 2012*, 2013*, 2017, 2022, 2023, 2025+, 2026
9	Alexandria-Monroe	1995, 1996, 1997, 1998*, 1999, 2003, 2010*, 2011*, 2012*
9	Frankton	2006, 2012*, 2013*, 2014*, 2015, 2016, 2018, 2019, 2024*
6	Mississinewa	2004, 2005, 2010*, 2014*, 2020, 2024*
6	Blackford	1976*, 1986, 1987*, 1992*, 1998*, 2025+
4	Madison-Grant	2002*, 2010*, 2012*, 2021
3	Elwood	2000, 2001, 2002*
1	Peru	1998*
1	Tipton	1994
0	Burris	
0	Eastbrook	
0	Hartford City	
0	Huntington North	
0	Monticello	
0	Noblesville	
0	Plymouth	
0	Rochester	
0	South Side (FW)	
0	Wabash	
0	Warsaw	
0	Windfall	

- Championships before 1993–94 season unverified.

=== Girls basketball ===
#	Team	Seasons
9	Tipton	1978, 1980, 1981, 1987, 1988, 1989, 1990, 1991*, 1992*
9	Oak Hill	2007, 2008, 2009, 2010, 2011*, 2012, 2017, 2018*, 2019
8	Frankton	1999, 2000, 2005, 2013, 2016*, 2018*, 2020, 2021
7	Alexandria-Monroe	1983, 1984, 1986, 1992*, 2001, 2002, 2003
5	Blackford	1982, 1991*, 1997*, 2023, 2024
4	Madison-Grant	1997*, 1998, 2011*, 2016*
4	Mississinewa	1992*, 1993, 1994, 2016*
4	Eastbrook	2014*, 2015, 2016*, 2022
3	Elwood	2004, 2006, 2014*
3	Peru	1991*, 1994, 1995
1	Wabash	1979

== 2012 Football Coaches ==
Alexandra- Pete Gast Blackford- Steve Rinker Eastbrook- Jeff Adamson Elwood- Marty Wells Frankton- Randy England Madison-Grant - Beau Engle Mississinewa- Curt Funk Oak Hill - Bud Ozmun

== State Champions and Finalists ==
=== Alexandria Monroe Tigers ===
1998 Boys 2A State Basketball Champions
1998 Boys 2A State Baseball Champions

2019 Boys 2A State Baseball Champions

=== Blackford Bruins ===
1974 IHSAA Class 2A Football State Champions
1979 IHSAA Class 2A Football State Champions
1977 IHSAA State Baseball Runner-Up
1978 IHSAA State Baseball Mental Attitude Award: Brian Lanham
1978 IHSAA State Baseball Runner-Up
1987 IHSAA State Boys Cross Country 5th
1990 IHSAA State Girls Golf Individual: Erika Wicoff Runner-Up
1991 IHSAA State Girls Golf Individual: Erika Wicoff Runner-Up
1991 IHSAA State Girls Golf Mental Attitude Award: Erika Wicoff
1991 IHSAA State Girls Golf Team Runner-Up
1992 IHSAA State Girls Golf Team Runner-Up

=== Eastbrook Panthers ===
2004 Football State Runners-up
2016 Football State Runners-up
2018 Football State Runners-up
2019 Football State Runners-up

=== Elwood Community Panthers ===
1987 Class 3A state runner up football
1999 State Wrestling Finalists
2008 class 2A state runner up baseball
2017 Class 2A State Runner up softball

=== Frankton Eagles ===
2000 Class 2A State Softball Champions
2003 Class 2A State Baseball Runner-Up
2005 Class 2A State Softball Runner-Up
2006 Class 2A State Softball Runner-Up
2015 Class 2A State Boys Basketball Runner-Up
2017 Class 2A State Boys Basketball Champions

=== Madison-Grant Argylls ===
2009 Class 2A Softball Champions

=== Oak Hill Golden Eagles ===
1982 IHSAA Class A Football State Champs
2008 IHSAA Class 2A Girls Basketball State Runner-Up
2009 IHSAA Class 2A Girls Basketball State Runner-Up
2017 IHSAA Class 2A Girls Basketball State Runner-Up
2018 IHSAA Class 2A Boys Basketball State Champs
2019 IHSSA Class 2A Girls Basketball State Champs

== Resources ==
- IHSAA Conferences
- IHSAA Directory
- CIC History
- Nicknames and Colors
