= Sharpsville =

Sharpsville is the name of several places in the United States of America:

- Sharpsville, Indiana
- Sharpsville, Pennsylvania

== See also ==
- Sharpeville, Gauteng, a township in South Africa, site of
  - Sharpeville massacre (1960)
