= Sean McDermott (basketball) =

American basketball player (born 1996)

No. 30 – Pallacanestro Trieste
- Position: Small forward
- League: LBA

Personal information
- Born: November 3, 1996 (age 29) Anderson, Indiana, U.S.
- Listed height: 6 ft 6 in (1.98 m)
- Listed weight: 195 lb (88 kg)

Career information
- High school: Pendleton Heights (Pendleton, Indiana)
- College: Butler (2016–2020)
- NBA draft: 2020: undrafted
- Playing career: 2020–present

Career history
- 2020–2021: Memphis Grizzlies
- 2021: →Memphis Hustle
- 2021–2023: Memphis Hustle
- 2023–2024: Openjobmetis Varese
- 2024–2025: Karşıyaka Basket
- 2025: Pallacanestro Trieste
- 2025–2026: Valley Suns
- 2026–present: Pallacanestro Trieste
- Stats at NBA.com
- Stats at Basketball Reference

Sean Patrick McDermott (born November 3, 1996) is an American professional basketball player for Pallacanestro Trieste of the Lega Basket Serie A (LBA). He played college basketball for the Butler Bulldogs.

== Early life ==
McDermott grew up in Anderson, Indiana and attended Pendleton Heights High School. After his basketball career at Butler, his mother ran a fitness center called "The Sports Center" where McDermott was often found playing basketball. As a senior, he averaged 16 points and 6.6 rebounds and was named an Indiana All-Star as he led the Arabians to the Hoosier Heritage Conference. McDermott committed to play college basketball at Butler over offers from Illinois State, Indiana State, New Orleans and UNC Greensboro. His uncle is long-time college coach, Linc Darner. His other uncle, Tige Darner, scored over 1,200 points for the Appalachian St Mountaineers.

== College career ==
McDermott was a member of the Butler Bulldogs for five seasons, redshirting as a true freshman. He became a role player off the bench as a redshirt freshman and averaged 2.3 points, 1.4 rebounds and 10.7 minutes of playing time in 30 games played. He became a starter midway through the following season and finished year averaging 7.5 points and 3.9 rebounds over 31 games. McDermott averaged 9.5 points and 3.9 rebounds in his first full season as a starter during his redshirt junior year. On November 6, 2019, he scored a career-high 26 points on 10-of-11 shooting in an 80–47 win against IUPUI. As a redshirt senior, McDermott averaged 11.7 points and 6.3 rebounds per game.

== Professional career ==
=== Memphis Grizzlies (2020–2021) ===
After going undrafted in the 2020 NBA draft, McDermott agreed to terms on a two-way contract with the Memphis Grizzlies and signed with the team on November 24, 2020.

On August 25, 2021, McDermott was waived by the Grizzlies, but was re-signed on September 23. He was waived again on October 14.

=== Memphis Hustle (2021–2023) ===
On October 23, 2021, McDermott signed with the Memphis Hustle as an affiliate player.

=== Openjobmetis Varese (2023–2024) ===
On July 20, 2023, McDermott signed with Openjobmetis Varese of the Lega Basket Serie A.

=== Karşıyaka Basket (2024–2025) ===
On September 1, 2024, he signed with Karşıyaka Basket of the Basketbol Süper Ligi (BSL).

=== Pallacanestro Trieste (2025) ===
On January 31, 2025, McDermott signed with Pallacanestro Trieste of the Italian Lega Basket Serie A (LBA).

=== Valley Suns (2025–2026) ===
On November 7, 2025, McDermott was named to the Valley Suns opening night roster.

=== Return to Pallacanestro Trieste (2026–present) ===
On July 19, 2026, McDermott returned to Pallacanestro Trieste of the Italian Lega Basket Serie A (LBA).

== Personal life ==
McDermott's younger brother, Chayce, is a professional baseball player in the New York Mets organization.

== Career statistics ==
Legend
GP	Games played	GS	Games started	MPG	Minutes per game
FG%	Field goal percentage	3P%	3-point field goal percentage	FT%	Free throw percentage
RPG	Rebounds per game	APG	Assists per game	SPG	Steals per game
BPG	Blocks per game	PPG	Points per game	**Bold**	Career high

=== NBA ===
Year	Team	GP	GS	MPG	FG%	3P%	FT%	RPG	APG	SPG	BPG	PPG
2020–21	Memphis	18	0	8.8	.394	.227	1.000	1.1	.2	.1	.2	2.2
Career		18	0	8.8	.394	.227	1.000	1.1	.2	.1	.2	2.2

=== College ===
Year	Team	GP	GS	MPG	FG%	3P%	FT%	RPG	APG	SPG	BPG	PPG
2016–17	Butler	30	2	10.7	.415	.357	.667	1.4	.3	.2	.2	2.3
2017–18	Butler	31	14	23.8	**.512**	**.431**	.818	3.9	**1.0**	**.7**	.2	7.5
2018–19	Butler	**33**	**33**	28.0	.442	.406	.811	3.9	.5	.5	.2	9.5
2019–20	Butler	31	31	**32.9**	.474	.394	**.868**	**6.3**	**1.0**	**.7**	**.4**	**11.7**
Career		125	80	24.0	.467	.403	.824	3.9	.7	.5	.2	7.8
