= G-W Invader =

Promotional pamphlet (1969) for G-W Invader

Back of promotional pamphlet

G-W Invader is a line of small recreational power boats that were manufactured by Arne Gray and George Wooldridge of Sharpsville, Indiana, United States.

== History ==
G-W Invader, (sometimes listed as GW Invader), began production in 1967 with its 10-foot and 16-foot boats. The "G-W" indicated the last names of the founders. The initial designs of 10 and 16 footers were that of sport racing boats with a very low profile, low weight, and shallow draft. The Invader hulls and decks were constructed of fiberglass over a wood structure or frame. Models were available in a variety of colors as well as unique color combinations at an added cost to the customer. G-W went on to increase the models and styles of boats. Arnie Gray sold his portion of G-W Invader boat factory to George Wooldridge before he moved to Tampa, Florida where he lived until he died in 1997. Transfer of ownership after sale to Mr. Wooldridge has been mentioned but not substantiated. Roger Harmon bought the company in 1985, and later sold it in 1995 to a Muncie, Indiana-based investment firm. G-W Invader expanded and moved into a new factory in Tipton, Indiana in 1993, a building formerly occupied by Pioneer Hi-Bred. Shortly after the expansion, they filed bankruptcy. G-W Invader ceased production of boats after 1997.

Roger Harmon later started Harmon Boats Fiberglas Specialists LLC in Sharpsville and Cicero, Indiana.

== Models ==
=== 10 foot G.W. Invader ===
The design of the 10-foot model gave the appearance of a racing boat with extremely shallow V-hull. Power was exclusively outboard engine. Seating was either a bench seat or 2 bucket seats.

- Length: 10 feet, 3 inches
- Beam: 61 inches
- Weight: 250 lbs
- Maximum Horsepower: 40 hp four stroke, 50 hp two stroke

=== 13 foot Banchie ===
Manufactured beginning in the 1970s, it has a more conventional V-hull and seated 5 people with a rear bench seat and 2 bucket seats up front.

- Length: 13 feet
- Beam: 70 inches
- Weight: N/A
- Maximum Horsepower: 80 hp
- Transom height: N/A

=== 14 foot ===
This model attained a top speed of 74 miles per hour (119 km/h) with a 100 horsepower (75 kW) engine according to the companies sales pamphlet.

- Length: 14 feet, 1 inches
- Beam: 62 inches
- Weight: 350 lbs
- Maximum Horsepower: 95
- Transom height: 20 inches

=== 14 foot V hull ===
Designed with the more conventional V-hull.

- Length: 14 feet, 1 inches
- Beam: 62 inches
- Weight: 350 lbs
- Maximum Horsepower: 95
- Transom height: 20 inches

G-W Invader 16-foot

=== 15 foot V hull ===
- Length: 15 feet, 1 inches
- Beam: 63 inches
- Weight: 385 lbs
- Maximum Horsepower: 100
- Transom height: 20 inches

=== 15 foot tunnel hull ===
This model had a tunnel hull unusual for recreational boats of the time.

- Length: 15 feet
- Beam: 81 inches
- Weight: 550 lbs
- Maximum Horsepower: 150
- Transom height: 25 inches

=== 16 foot Intruder ===
The design of the 16-foot model had seating for four individuals. It was available as a sterndrive or could be mounted with an outboard motor. This model had a squared nose

- Length: 16 feet
- Beam: 72 inches
- Weight: 475 lbs
- Maximum Horsepower: 160
- Transom height: 20 inches

=== 18 foot Bravo ===
- Length: 18.25 feet, 1 inches
- Beam: 92 inches
- Weight: 2250 lbs
- Maximum Horsepower: 115/175 4.3V6
- 20 Gallon Fuel Tank

iBoat Listing

- Transom height: N/A inches

=== 180 ESS ===
- Length: 18 feet
- Beam: 92 inches
- Weight: 2250 lbs
- Maximum Horsepower: 205
- Transom height: N/A

=== 20 foot Bravo ESC ===
Inboard model. It has two personal seats and a bench seat. There is also a cabin in which you can sleep.

- Length: 20 feet
- Beam: 96 inches
- Transom height: 30 inches
- Engine model: Mercruiser 4.3l V6
- Maximum horsepower: 205

=== Rivera 220 Sport ===
This was an inboard model and came in the color gold or silver.

- Length: 22 feet
- Beam: 81 inches
- Weight: 2750 lbs
- Maximum Horsepower: Inboard, horsepower N/A
- Transom height: N/A
