= Mississinewa High School =

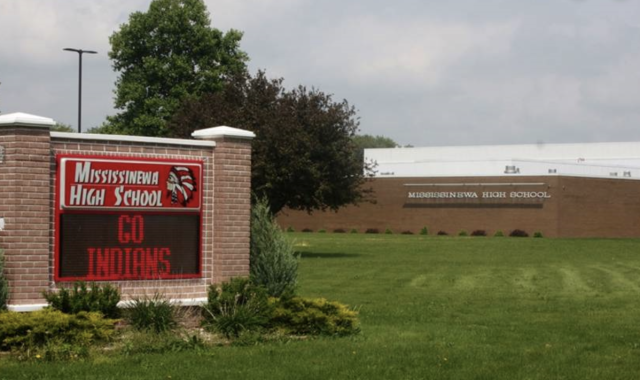
- Mississinewa High School, 2019]

Location
- One Indian Trail; Gas City, Grant County, Indiana 46933; United States; 40°29′48″N 85°36′48″W

Information
- Type: Public High School
- Status: Ongoing Financial Issues
- School district: Mississinewa Community School Corporation
- Superintendent: Jeremy Fewell
- Faculty: 52.05 (FTE)
- Grades: 9, 10, 11, 12
- Enrollment: 790 (2023–2024)
- Student to teacher ratio: 15.05
- Colors: Red and white
- Athletics conference: Central Indiana Conference
- Nickname: Indians
- Rival: Marion,Eastbrook
- Website: mhs.olemiss.k12.in.us

Mississinewa High School is a high school in Gas City, Indiana, United States, with more than 800 students. The nickname of the students and the athletic teams is "Mississinewa Indians". This school is a part of the Mississinewa Community School Corporation, or MCSC, which also features Westview Elementary School, Northview Elementary School, and R.J. Baskett Middle School.

== Athletic Conference and History ==
This school is a part of the Central Indiana Conference (CIC), which it has been since 1979. Prior to 1979 it was a part of numerous athletic conferences. The Grant County Conference from the school's founding in 1948 until 1965. The school joined the Mississinewa Valley Conference in 1952, concurrently playing in both until it left the GCC in 1965. It continued in the MVC until 1975, moving to the Classic Athletic Conference where it remained until 1979. It currently has an IHSAA Class of AAA for the sport of football.

== Notable alumni ==
- Ron Horn - NBA forward

== See also ==
- List of high schools in Indiana
