= Wes-Del Community Schools Corporation =

School district in Indiana

Location
- 10240 N County Road 600 W Gaston, Indiana United States

District information
- Type: public
- Grades: Pre-K through 12
- Established: 1964; 62 years ago
- Superintendent: Kyle Mealy
- Schools: 2
- NCES District ID: IN-1885

Students and staff
- Students: 893 (2022)
- Teachers: 62 (2022)
- Student–teacher ratio: 14.4 (2022)
- District mascot: Warrior
- Colors

Other information
- Website: www.wes-del.k12.in.us

Wes-Del Community Schools Corporation is a school district headquartered in Gaston, Indiana, United States. It was formed in 1964. As of the 2021/2022 school year, 893 students attended school in the corporation.

Located in Delaware County, the district includes Gaston and a few pieces of Muncie.

== List of Schools ==
Name	Address	Principal	No. of Students	No. of Teachers
Wes-Del Elementary School	500 E Jackson St, Gaston, IN 47342	Todd Reagan	414 (2022)	28 (2022)
Wes-Del Middle/High School	10000 N County Road 600 W, Gaston, IN 47342	Adam Perdue	479 (2021)	35 (2021)

== See also ==
- Cowan Community School Corporation
- Delaware Community School Corporation
- Muncie Community Schools Corporation
