= Eastbrook High School =

Location
- 560 South 900 East; Marion, Grant County, Indiana 46953; United States; 40.545558°N 85.505622°W

Information
- Type: Public high school
- Superintendent: Brett Garrett
- Principal: James E. Roberts III
- Faculty: 35.50 FTE
- Grades: 9-12
- Enrollment: 506 (2023-2024)
- Color
- Team name: Panthers
- Rivals: Mississinewa, Blackford, Oak Hill, and Madison-Grant
- Website: highschool.eastbrook.k12.in.us

Eastbrook High School is a public school located outside Marion, Indiana, United States. The school teaches students from Upland, Washington Township, Matthews, and Van Buren.

== Campus ==
Eastbrook High School is located at 560 S. 900 E. in Grant County, Indiana. It is the only high school in the Eastbrook Community School district. The district includes the high school, a junior high (which is attached to the high school), and two elementary schools: Eastbrook South Elementary (located in Upland, Indiana) and Eastbrook North Elementary (located in Van Buren, Indiana). At the end of the 2009–2010 school year, Matthews Elementary, and Washington Elementary were closed and the remaining elementary schools were renamed from Upland Elementary and Van Buren Elementary to South and North, respectively.

Eastbrook is a member of the Central Indiana Conference (CIC).

== Extracurricular activities ==
Sports: Baseball (b), Cheerleading (g), Cross Country (b/g), Football (b), Golf (b/g), Marching Band (b/g), Softball (g), Track (b/g), Volleyball (g), Wrestling (b), Soccer (b/g).

== Notable alumni ==
- Chad Wilt, college football coach
- Dawn Davenport, collegiate volleyball player

== See also ==
- List of high schools in Indiana
