= WEEM-FM =

Coordinates: 39.998°N 85.735°W

- Pendleton, Indiana; United States
- Broadcast area: East Central Indiana
- Frequency: 91.7 MHz

Programming
- Format: Top 40

Ownership
- Owner: South Madison Community School Corporation

History
- First air date: November 1, 1971
- Call sign meaning: With Efforts of Ernest Miller

Technical information
- Licensing authority: FCC
- Class: A
- ERP: 1,200 watts
- HAAT: 47 meters (154 ft)

Links
- Public license information: Public file; LMS
- Website: http://www.917weem.org

WEEM-FM (91.7 FM) is a student-run high school radio station of Pendleton Heights High School in Pendleton, Indiana. It broadcasts in the CHR music format. The station is owned by South Madison Community School Corporation and is operated by students at Pendleton Heights High School.

== Broadcasting information ==
The station broadcasts with 1.2 kilowatts of both vertical and horizontal power at 47 meters (154 ft) of height above average terrain serving portions of Hamilton, Hancock, Marion, Madison, and Henry counties.

== Awards ==
2012: Indiana Association of School Broadcasters Radio School Of The Year

2016: Intercollegiate Broadcasting System National High School Radio Station Of The Year
