= Hoosier Heritage Conference =

School athletic conference in Indiana, United States

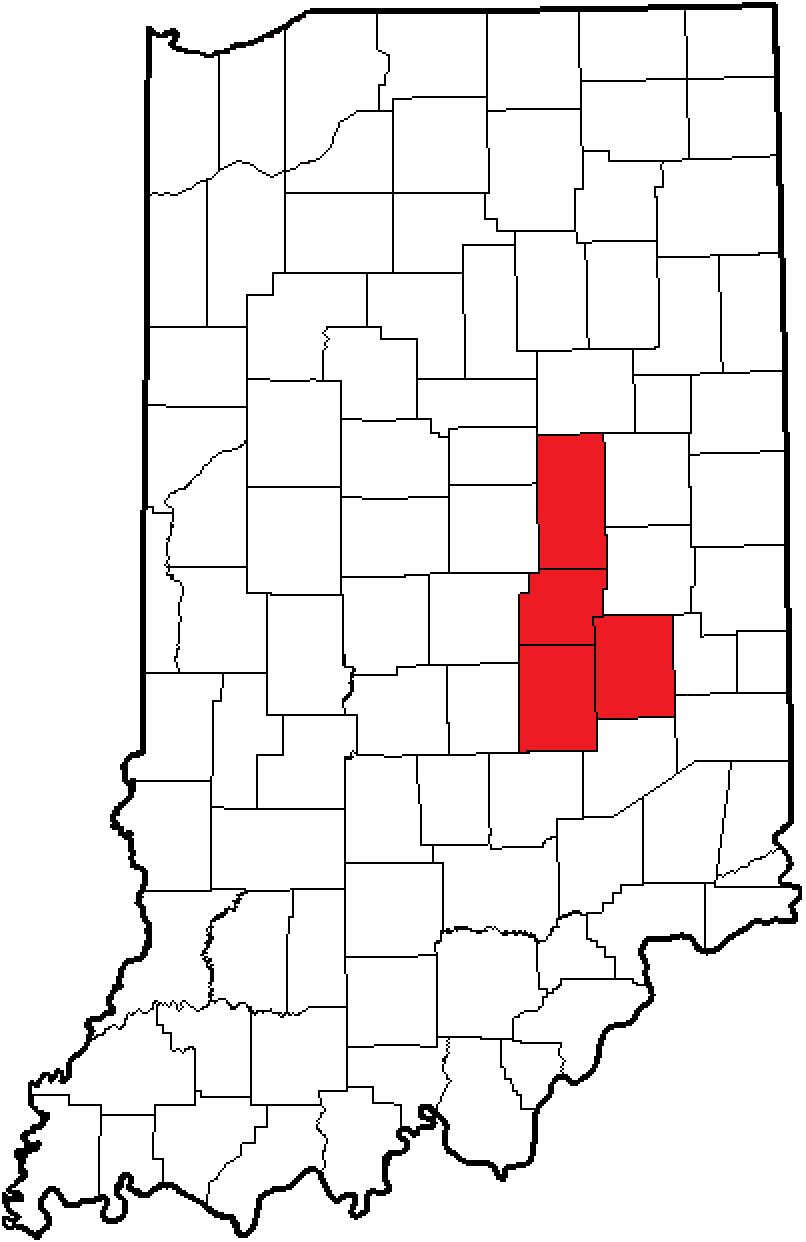
Hoosier Heritage Conference in Indiana

Hoosier Heritage Conference is an athletic and extra/co-curricular activity conference of Indiana high schools. The conference formed in 1993. It is formed of Madison, Hancock, Henry, Shelby, and Delaware Counties.

== Membership ==
=== Current members ===
Members departing for the Hoosier Legends Conference in 2026.

Members departing for the Eastern Crossroads Conference in 2026.

School	Location	Mascot	Colors	Enrollment 24–25	IHSAA Class	IHSAA Class Football	# / County	Year joined	Former Conference
Delta	Muncie	Eagles		798	3A	3A	18; Delaware	1997	White River
Greenfield- Central	Greenfield	Cougars		1,430	4A	4A	30; Hancock	1993	independent
Mt. Vernon (Fortville)	Fortville	Marauders		1,455	4A	4A	30; Hancock	1993	White River
New Castle	New Castle	Trojans		824	3A	4A	33; Henry	2013^{1}	North Central
New; Palestine	New Palestine	Dragons		1,209	3A	4A	30; Hancock	1993	Rangeline
Pendleton; Heights	Pendleton	Arabians		1,353	4A	4A	48; Madison	1993	White River
Shelbyville	Shelbyville	Golden Bears		1,093	3A	4A	73; Shelby	1997	South Central
Yorktown	Yorktown	Tigers		812	3A	4A	18; Delaware	1999	Rangeline

1. New Castle was removed from the NCC in 2013. The HHC was able to include them in some competitions during the 2013–14 school year, with full membership granted for the next year.

=== Future Members ===
School	Location	Mascot	Colors	# / County	Current Conference	Year Joining
Lebanon	Lebanon	Tigers		06; Boone	Sagamore	2027
Brebeuf Jesuit	Indianapolis	Braves		49; Marion	Circle City	2027
Guerin Catholic	Noblesville	Golden Eagles		29; Hamilton	Circle City	2027

=== Former members ===
School	Location	Mascot	Colors	# / County	Year joined	Former Conference	Year left	Current Conference
Hamilton; Southeastern	Fishers	Royals		32; Hamilton	1993	Rangeline	1998	Hoosier Crossroads
Rushville	Rushville	Lions		70; Rush	1993	South Central	2013	Eastern Indiana

Academic events include HHC Spell Bowl, Quiz Bowl, and Academic Super Bowl. Conference champions are determined for each sport and academic event. In addition, the HHC conference recognizes academic achievement among athletes, awarding a plaque to individuals who are letter winners, in grades 10–12, and who rank in the top five percent of their class.

== IHSAA State Champions ==
IHSAA State Champions

=== Delta Eagles (9) ===
- 1981 Wrestling
- 1982 Wrestling
- 1983 Wrestling
- 1984 Wrestling
- 1985 Wrestling
- 2001 Volleyball (3A)
- 2002 Volleyball (3A)
- 2002 Boys Basketball (3A)
- 2009 Volleyball (3A)

=== Greenfield-Central Cougars (1) ===
- 1973 Football (2A)

=== Mt. Vernon Marauders (4) ===
- 2000 Softball (2A)
- 2013 Girls Basketball (3A)
- 2021 Football (4A)
- 2026 Boys Basketball (4A)

=== New Castle Trojans (6) ===
- 1932 Boys Basketball
- 2006 Boys Basketball (3A)
- 2007 Volleyball (4A)
- 2017 Volleyball (3A)
- 2018 Volleyball (3A)
- 2019 Volleyball (4A)

=== New Palestine Dragons (12) ===
- 2004 Baseball (3A)
- 2004 Softball (3A)
- 2008 Softball (3A)
- 2009 Softball (3A)
- 2014 Football (4A)
- 2017 Softball (3A)
- 2018 Football (5A)
- 2018 Softball (3A)
- 2019 Football (5A)
- 2019 Softball (3A)
- 2024 Football (4A)
- 2025 Football (5A)

=== Shelbyville Golden Bears(1) ===
- 1947 Boys Basketball

=== Yorktown Tigers (7) ===
- 1975 Boys Golf
- 1977 Girls' Golf
- 2000 Volleyball (3A)
- 2011 Volleyball (3A)
- 2012 Girls' Golf
- 2016 Volleyball (3A)
- 2018 Volleyball (4A)
- 2020 Volleyball (4A)
