= Blackford High School (Indiana) =

Blackford Junior-Senior High School
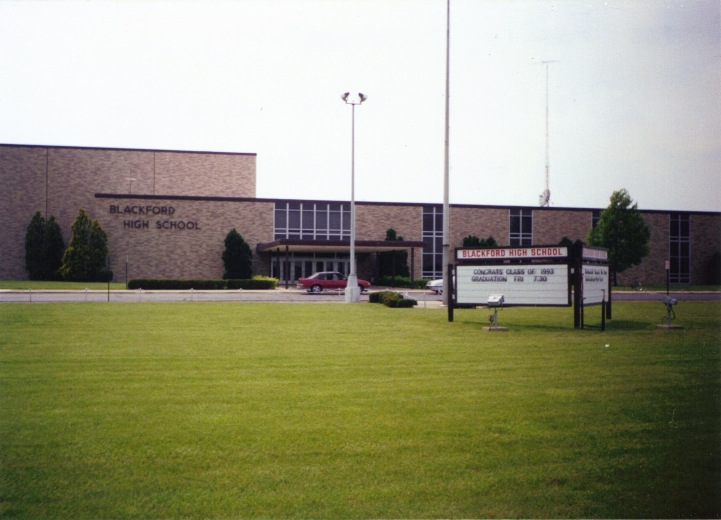

Location
- 2392 North State Road 3 Hartford City, Indiana 47348; United States; 40°29′06″N 85°22′17″W

Information
- Type: Public high school
- Motto: Nulli Secundus (Second to None)
- Established: 1969
- Principal: Jason Ridge
- Teaching staff: 50.50 (on an FTE basis)
- Grades: 7-12
- Enrollment: 715 (2023–2024)
- Student to teacher ratio: 14.16
- Color
- Nickname: Bruins
- Website: www.blackfordschools.org/o/bhs

Blackford Junior-Senior High School is a public high school in Hartford City, Indiana which includes grades 7 through 12. It is part of the Blackford County School District, and is the sole public high school serving all of Blackford County. Like the county, Blackford High School is named after Isaac Blackford.

== History ==
Blackford High School opened in the fall of 1969, replacing the former Hartford City High School and Montpelier High School. Blackford High School's team colors are red, white, and black. These colors were selected from the high schools that used to exist in the county. Red came from the Roll Red Rollers. White came from the Montpelier Spartans. Black came from the Hartford City Airedales.

== Athletics ==
The football team won the state championship in 1974 and 1979.

== Notable alumni ==
- Kevin A. Ford, Class of 1978 -- NASA astronaut

== See also ==
- List of high schools in Indiana
- Central Indiana Athletic Conference
- Hartford City, Indiana
