= Frankton Junior-Senior High School =

Location
- 610 Clyde Street; Frankton, Madison County, Indiana 46044; United States
- Coordinates: 40.220604°N 85.773343°W

Information
- Type: Public high school
- School district: Frankton-Lapel Community Schools
- Principal: Brett Sanders
- Teaching staff: 44.20 (FTE)
- Grades: 7–12
- Enrollment: 794 (2023–24)
- Student to teacher ratio: 17.96
- Color
- Athletics conference: Central Indiana Athletic Conference
- Team name: Eagles
- Website: Official Website

Frankton Junior-Senior High School is a public high school located in Frankton, Indiana.

== See also ==
- List of high schools in Indiana
