= Lapel High School =

Location
- 1850 S 900 W Lapel, Madison County, Indiana 46011; United States; 40°4′5″N 85°50′51″W

Information
- Type: Public high school
- Established: 1890
- School district: Frankton-Lapel Community Schools
- Principal: Matthew Boles
- Teaching staff: 33.70 (FTE)
- Grades: 9-12
- Enrollment: 462 (2024–2025)
- Student to teacher ratio: 13.71
- Color
- Athletics: Indiana High School Athletic Association
- Athletics conference: Independent
- Team name: Bulldogs
- Website: Website

Lapel High School is a public high school located in Lapel, Indiana.

== Athletics ==
Athletic teams at Lapel go by the nickname Bulldogs and compete as Independents. They formerly competed in the Indiana Crossroads Conference until 2014. They won the IHSAA State Boys’ Basketball Tournament in 2005 and 2016.

== See also ==
- List of high schools in Indiana
