= Pendleton Heights High School =

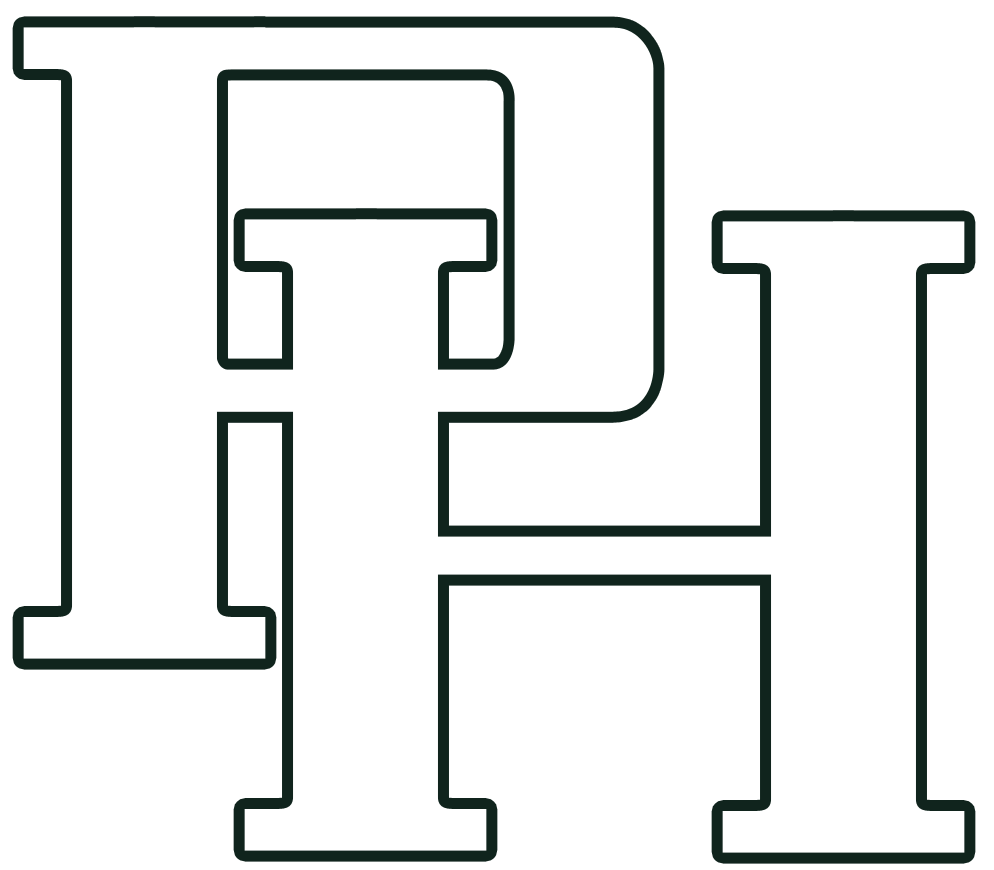

Location
- 1 Arabian Drive; Pendleton, Madison County, Indiana 46064; United States; 39.997315°N 85.735368°W

Information
- Type: Public high school
- Established: 1969
- School district: South Madison Community School Corporation
- Principal: Shaun Rose
- Teaching staff: 68.00 (FTE)
- Grades: 9-12
- Enrollment: 1,353 (2023-2024)
- Student to teacher ratio: 19.90
- Colors: Green and white
- Athletics conference: Hoosier Heritage Conference
- Team name: Arabians
- Rival: Mount Vernon High School
- Yearbook: Scimitar (1970-); Papyrus (1916-1969)
- Website: phhs.smcsc.com

Pendleton Heights High School, also known as "PHHS," is a public high school in Pendleton, Indiana. It is part of the South Madison Community School Corporation and has an enrollment of around 1,400 students.

== History ==
Pendleton Heights was built in 1969 as a consolidation of Adams Township's Markleville High School and Fall Creek Township's Pendleton High School. The consolidation happened after the Indiana State Legislature passed the School Reorganization Act, causing the redistricting of school boundaries so that each student was backed by $5,000 in assessed tax evaluation. Under this Act, Markleville High school no longer qualified as a public high school. In 1959, a nine-man school reorganization committee was appointed to redistrict the school systems of Madison County.

After much discussion and many public meetings throughout the county a plan was devised that met all requirements. In southern Madison County, the new school district consisted of Green, Fall Creek and Adams Townships. The area chosen to build the new consolidated school consisted of approximately 112 acres (0.45 km^{2}) just east of Pendleton, bordering State Road 67 and State Road 38. Central location of this site to the schools was considered in the selection. The property was sold to the school in early 1967 with construction on the new high school starting in October of that year. The original building was completed for occupancy September 1, 1969, with the first graduating class in 1970.

The school began construction on the school in 1996 with a remodeling and renovation project. The project; which consisted of a new academic wing and media center, a 900-seat auditorium and performing arts center, and an auxiliary gymnasium; was completed in Spring 1999. In Spring 2009, the 10-year anniversary of the renovation was celebrated with the "Loran G. Skinner's 10th Anniversary Gala", which featured the High School's Pendletones show choir, the PHHS Jazz Band, and revival performances of plays and musicals by previous cast members. Additional construction began in 2019, which would introduce a new athletic center, all-new weight room, and updated locker rooms.

== Extra curricular activities ==
- Pendleton Elites, an E-sports team that is a part of IHSEN
- Art Club
- Language Clubs (includes Spanish, French, German)
- Outdoor adventure club
- Academic teams

=== Athletics ===
Pendleton Heights High School is part of the Hoosier Heritage Conference.

==== Athletic programs ====
Fall

- Boys' and Girls' Cross Country
- Football
- Girls' Golf
- Boys' and Girls' Soccer
- Boys' Tennis
- Volleyball
- Cheerleading
- Marching Band

Winter

- Boys' and Girls' Basketball
- Boys' and Girls' Swimming & Diving
- Wrestling
- Cheerleading

Spring

- Baseball
- Softball
- Boys' Golf
- Girls' Tennis
- Boys' and Girls' Track & Field

=== Band ===
Pendleton Heights is home to three concert bands, Wind Symphony, Wind Ensemble, and Symphonic Band. Students also participate in Jazz Band, student-ran Jazz Combo, Pep Band, Indoor Percussion, or Marching Band. The Pendleton Bands have been under the direction of Chris Taylor since 2007, and the co-direction of Alec Newman since 2024. In 2014, the Pendleton Heights Indoor Percussion ensemble placed first in the Class A state championship with their show "Joaquin on Sunshine." In 2018 The Marching Arabians performed "Spintronics" and qualified for the ISSMA Class B State Finals at Lucas Oil Stadium for the first time in school history, placing ninth in their class. In 2019 they returned to State Finals performing the show "Being a Villain" placing tenth. In 2021 the Marching Arabians performing, "Dimensions" and advanced to ISSMA Semi-State Finals at Pike High School, just shy of qualifying for State Finals. In 2022 performing the show "Lost Paradise Found", the Marching Arabians found themselves back in state finals placing a school record high at 7th place. In 2024 they performed the show "From Dusk Til Dawn," making it to ISSMA State Finals at Lucas Oil Stadium and once again placing 7th. In 2025, they performed the show "Leviathan," making it to state for the second year in a row. They placed 8th overall.

=== Choir ===
Pendleton Heights has four show choirs. Pendletones, the varsity mixed group, has earned multiple Grand Champion titles over their past seasons, and the unisex girls' group, Emerald Suites, had successful 2022 and 2024 seasons, having an undefeated record in the small unisex group for both years. New Edition and Added Attraction, the junior varsity unisex and mixed choirs (respectively), have also participated at select competitions across the state. Both varsity choirs have qualified to compete ISSMA Show Choir State Finals in 2022, 2023, and 2024. The groups are backed by a band named "Team Awesome", consisting of current students and alumni.

=== Broadcasting ===
Pendleton Heights High School is the proud host of WEEM (91.7 FM). The radio station is student-run and broadcasts in the Modern AC format, with students hosting shows. The radio program won the Indiana Association of School Broadcasters "Radio School of the Year" award in 2012.

=== Gay Straight alliance ===
Pendleton Heights High School has its own club to support their LGBTQIA+ students called the "Gay Straight Alliance". This is to form some equality within the school. The “Gay Straight Alliance” was a part of the yearly Homecoming Parade the town celebrates. The club is inclusive and it is free to join. Recent controversies surrounding the group had been a topic of state-wide news, as the members joined with the ACLU to allow for the continuation of the club. After this controversy, the school decided to disallow all clubs from advertising including the school newspaper; since people were upset about the GSA not being allowed to advertise they just stopped allowing any clubs to advertise.

== Other information ==
Pendleton Heights High School was recognized as one of the best high schools in the nation by Newsweek for 2010.

== Notable alumni ==
- Scott Reske (1978), member of the Indiana House of Representatives
- Mike Gaskill (1985), member of the Indiana Senate
- Vaughn Duggins (2006), basketball player who played overseas
- Brock Huntzinger (2006), pitching coach for the Michigan Wolverines, former Minor League Baseball player
- Kellen Dunham (2012), former NBA G League player
- Sean McDermott (2015), former NBA player
- Chayce McDermott (2016), pitcher for the Baltimore Orioles

== See also ==
- List of high schools in Indiana
- Hoosier Heritage Conference
- Pendleton, Indiana
