= Royerton, Indiana =

- Unincorporated community and Census-designated place
- Location within Indiana Location within the United States
- Coordinates: 40°15′49″N 85°22′23″W
- Country: United States
- State: Indiana
- County: Delaware
- Township: Hamilton
- Established: 1870
- Founded by: John Royer
- Elevation: 929 ft (283 m)
- ZIP code: 47303
- Area code: 765
- FIPS code: 18-66312
- GNIS feature ID: 2830359

Royerton is an unincorporated community in Hamilton Township, Delaware County, Indiana.

== History ==
Royerton was laid out in 1870 by John Royer.

== Demographics ==
Historical population
Census	Pop.	Note	%±
2023 (est.)	327

The United States Census Bureau defined Royerton as a census designated place in the 2022 American Community Survey.
