= Tri-Central Middle/High School =

Location
- 2115 West 500 North; Sharpsville, Tipton County, Indiana 46068; United States; 40.375254°N 86.053229°W

Information
- Type: Public high school
- Established: 1970
- School district: Tri-Central Community Schools
- Superintendent: Dave Driggs
- Principal: Adam Long
- Teaching staff: 31.50 (FTE)
- Grades: 6-12
- Enrollment: 402 (2023-2024)
- Student to teacher ratio: 12.76
- Color
- Athletics conference: Hoosier Heartland Conference
- Team name: Trojans
- Website: Official Website

Tri-Central Middle/High School is a four-year public high school located in Sharpsville, Indiana, in an unincorporated community approximately 9.2 miles northwest of Tipton, Indiana. The school was created by the merger of Windfall High School and Sharpsville-Prairie High School. Construction on the school started in June 1969 and the school opened on Sept. 8, 1970. The school is the only high school of the Tri-Central Community School Corporation.

== Athletics ==
The following sports are offered at Tri-Central:

- Baseball (boys)
- Basketball (boys & girls)
  - Girls State Champs, 2002–03, 2003–04, 2005-06 (A)
- Cheerleading (girls)
- Cross Country (boys & girls)
- Football (boys)
  - State Champs, 2013-2014 (A)
- Golf (boys)
- Marching Band and Color Guard (boys & girls)
- Soccer (boys & girls)
- Softball (girls)
- Track & Field (boys & girls)
- Volleyball (girls)
- Wrestling (boys)

== See also ==
- List of high schools in Indiana
