= Sharpsville, Indiana =

- Town
- Town of Sharpsville
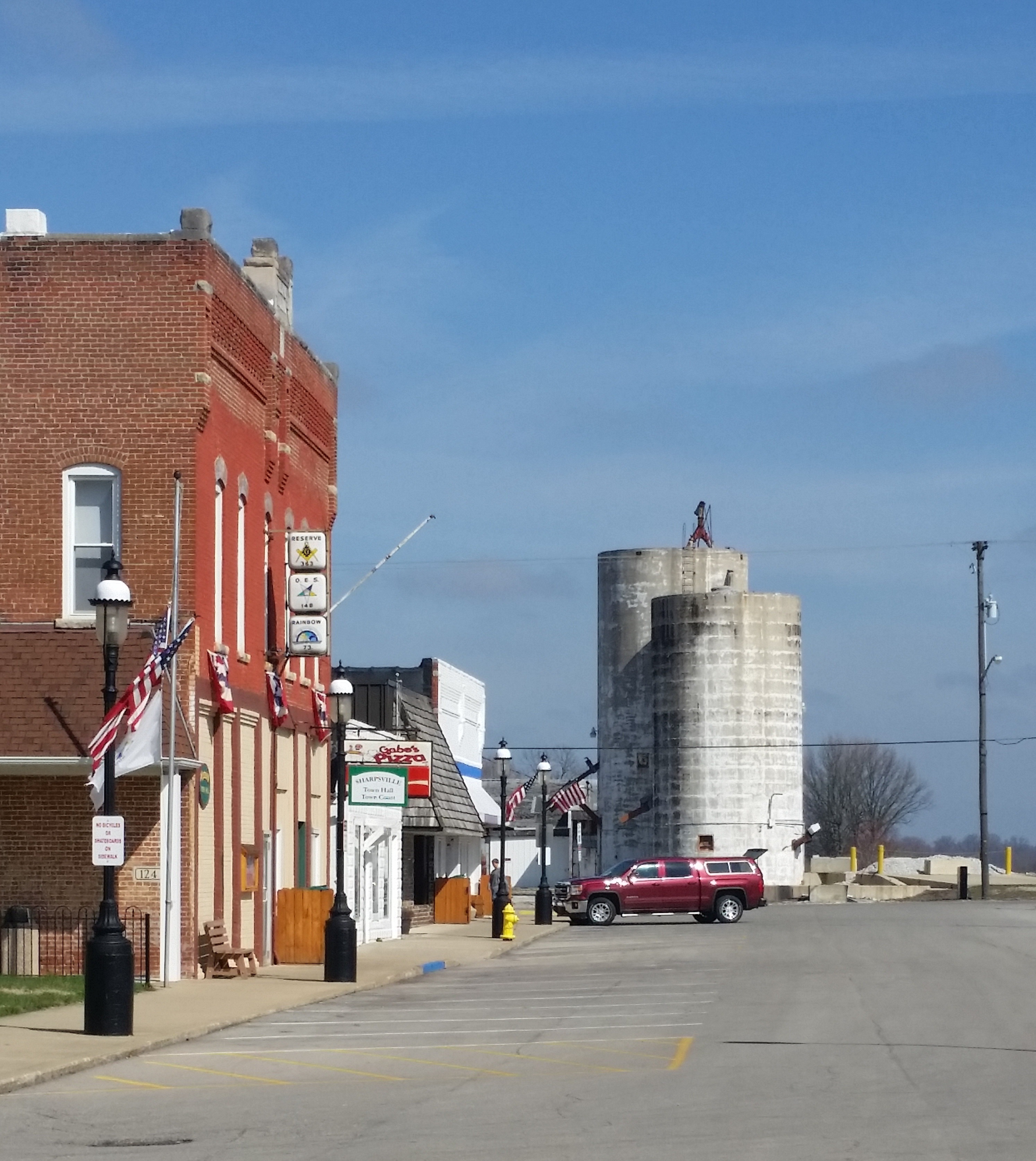
- Sharpsville main street

- Seal

- Location of Sharpsville in Tipton County, Indiana.
- Coordinates: 40°22′47″N 86°05′13″W
- Country: United States
- State: Indiana
- County: Tipton
- Township: Liberty

Area
  - Total: 0.23 sq mi (0.60 km^{2})
  - Land: 0.23 sq mi (0.60 km^{2})
  - Water: 0 sq mi (0.00 km^{2})
- Elevation: 876 ft (267 m)

Population (2020)
  - Total: 553
  - Density: 2,400.3/sq mi (926.76/km^{2})
- Time zone: UTC-5 (Eastern (EST))
  - Summer (DST): UTC-4 (EDT)
- ZIP code: 46068
- Area code: 765
- FIPS code: 18-69048
- GNIS feature ID: 2397653
- Website: Town of Sharpsville

Sharpsville is a town in Liberty Township, Tipton County, in the U.S. state of Indiana. The community is part of the Kokomo, Indiana Metropolitan Statistical Area. As of the 2020 census, Sharpsville had a population of 553.

== History ==
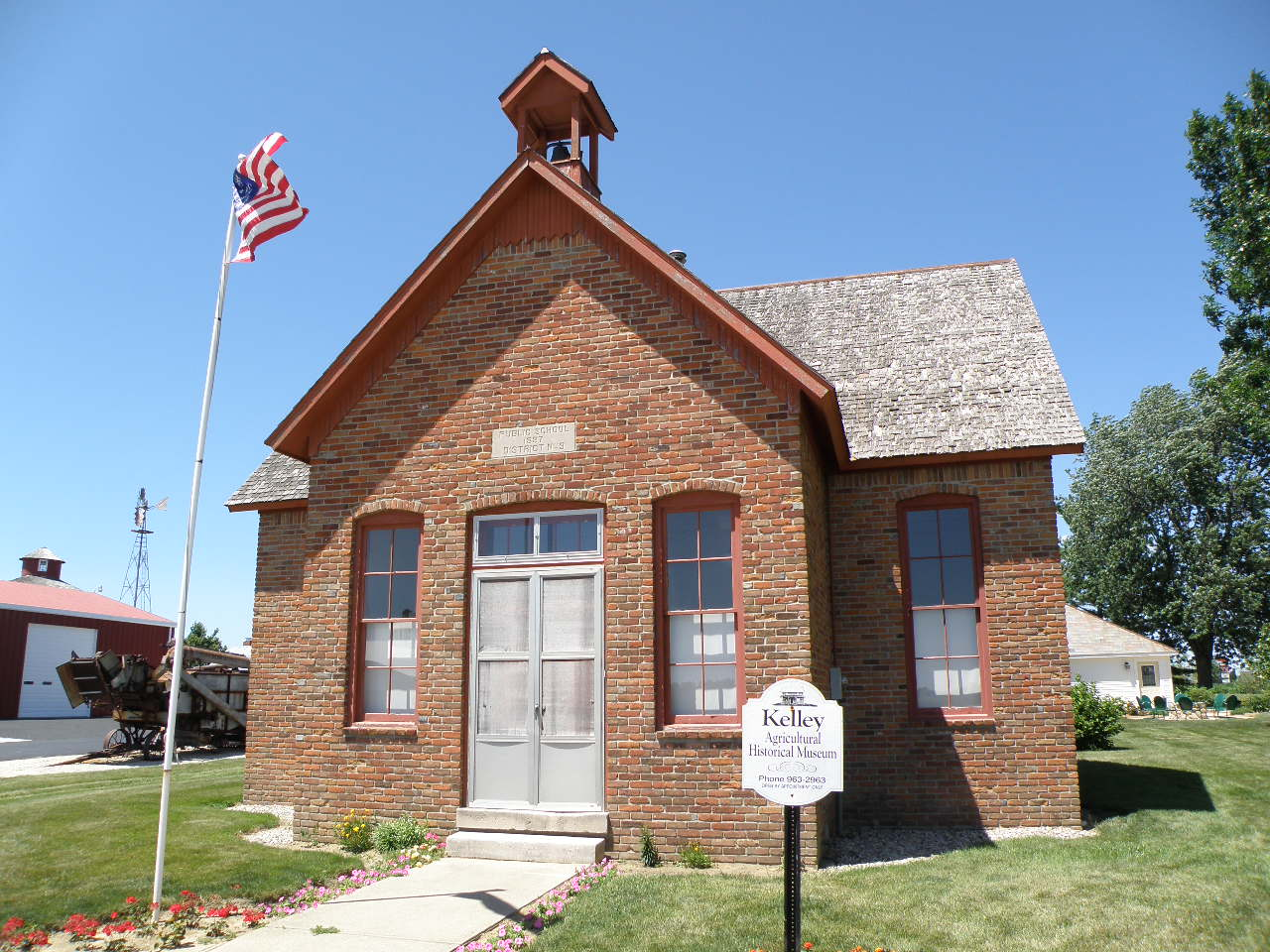
School House, Kelley Historical Museum in Sharpsville

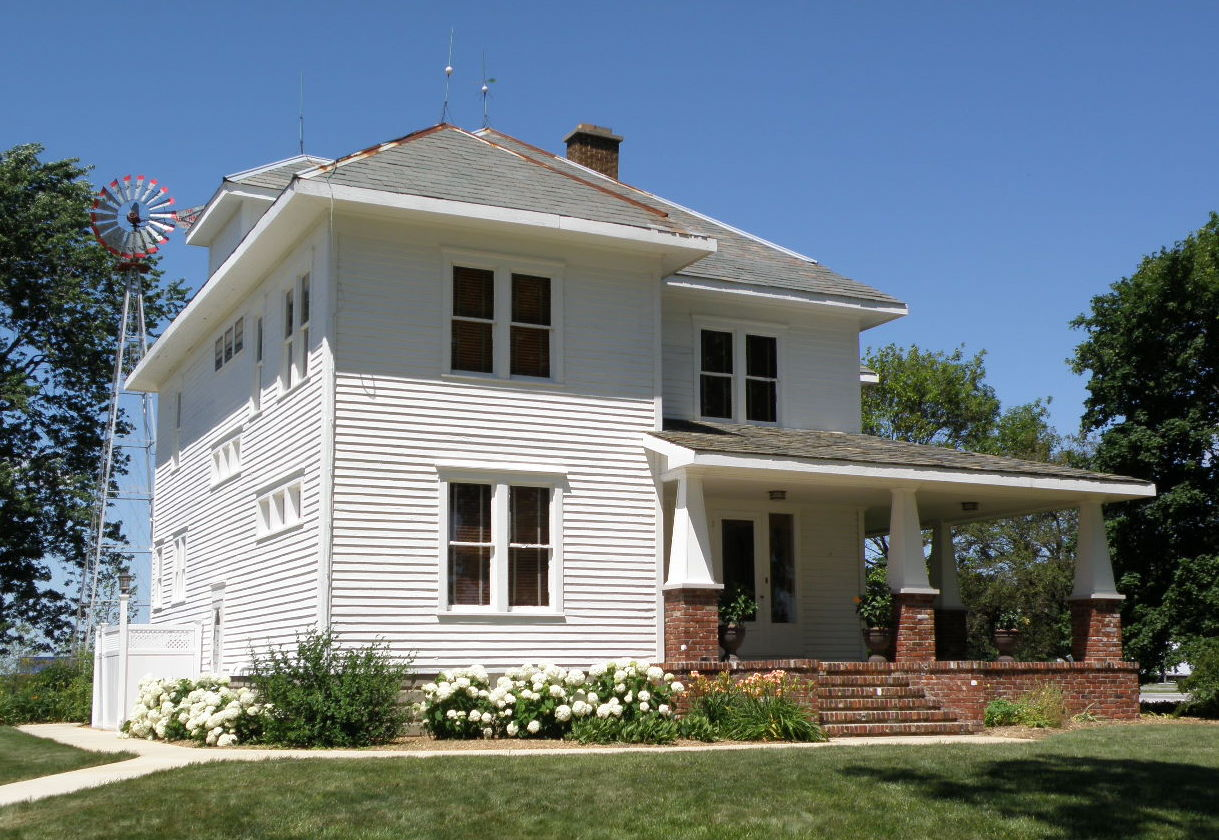
Sharpsville home in Kelley Historical Museum

The town was named after founder E.M. Sharp, who originally was from Washington County, Pennsylvania. Sharp moved to Morgan County, Illinois in 1831, prior to relocating to Jennings County, Indiana in 1838. In spring 1849, he moved to Liberty Township. The town was platted on May 24, 1850, under the assumption that Sharpsville would become the county seat for Tipton Township (which became Tipton). A town square was incorporated into the town layout which became a public park rather than the location of a place of government. The town was incorporated in 1873, but it ceased to be incorporated by vote in 1881 and regained village status.

The Sharpsville post office has been in operation since 1851.

Many of the first buildings were churches. The First Methodist church in Sharpsville was built in 1852 and the Richland Evangelical Lutheran Church in 1857. In 1873, the Hopewell Presbyterian Church was founded 2.5 miles east of Sharpsville, with a building being completed for the congregation in 1874.

As the need for local education arose in 1852, Martha Ann Grishaw would become teacher of the first school in Sharpsville. School was held in a wooden cabin. The second school was taught by Lizzie Smith in a small house on the south-side of the town square. The earliest schools were subscription schools where citizens paid a fee to have their children educated. Later a Secondary school was founded as Sharpsville-Prairie High School. In 1970 the High School, along with Windfall High School, merged to form Tri-Central Middle/High School.

Sharpsville was home to participants in the American Civil War . On August 9, 1861, a company assembled in Sharpsville that would join the 26th Indiana Infantry Regiment as Company C. In all, 78 listed on the Company C Roster listed Sharpsville as their town of residence. The 26th Infantry participated in military actions including the Battle of Prairie Grove and the Siege of Vicksburg.

In 1871 a four-story grain elevator was built to give local farmers a way to store grain. The silos had a capacity of 18,500 bushels. While the silos still stand, the elevator was razed in 1990 due to aging of equipment. The granary was serviced by the Nickel Plate Road, a railroad that later become part of Norfolk Southern Railway. The now abandoned tracks once connected Sharpsville to Kokomo and Tipton. A train station that once stood on the southeast corner of Meridian Street and North Street was razed in 1967. In the early 20th century, Sharpsville was serviced by an interurban rail line operated by Union Traction Company. The line connected Sharpsville with Peru, Indiana, to the north and Indianapolis to the south. As with most interurbans, the Sharpsville stop fell out of use by the mid-1920s.

The Sharpsville Cemetery, founded in 1875, is located southeast of the town.

== Geography ==
According to the 2010 census, Sharpsville has a total area of 0.24 square miles (0.62 km^{2}), all land. Sharpsville is bound on the south by Broad Creek a stream that connects Mud Creek going East and Barr Ditch going West.

== Climate ==
July is typically the warmest month in Sharpsville, when highs average 84 °F (29 °C) and lows average 62 °F (17 °C). January is coldest, when the high temperatures average 30 °F (-1 °C) and the lows average 15 °F (-9 °C). The highest recorded temperature was 110 °F (43 °C) in 1936, and the lowest was -26 °F (−32 °C) in 1925. The record snowfall for Sharpsville is 16.4" on February 14, 2007, during the February 2007 North American blizzard.

== Demographics ==
Historical population
| Census | Pop. | Note | %± |
|---|---|---|---|
| 1880 | 280 | | — |
| 1890 | 377 | | 34.6% |
| 1930 | 512 | | — |
| 1940 | 518 | | 1.2% |
| 1950 | 508 | | −1.9% |
| 1960 | 663 | | 30.5% |
| 1970 | 672 | | 1.4% |
| 1980 | 617 | | −8.2% |
| 1990 | 769 | | 24.6% |
| 2000 | 618 | | −19.6% |
| 2010 | 607 | | −1.8% |
| 2020 | 553 | | −8.9% |
U.S. Decennial Census

=== Early census ===
As of 1914, Sharpsville had a population of approximately 700.

=== 2010 census ===
As of the census of 2010, there were 607 people, 227 households, and 168 families residing in the town. The population density was 2,529.2 inhabitants per square mile (976.5/km^{2}). There were 255 housing units at an average density of 1,062.5 per square mile (410.2/km^{2}). The racial makeup of the town was 97.5% White, 0.2% African American, 0.7% from other races, and 1.6% from two or more races. Hispanic or Latino of any race were 2.0% of the population.

There were 227 households, of which 38.3% had children under the age of 18 living with them, 54.6% were married couples living together, 14.5% had a female householder with no husband present, 4.8% had a male householder with no wife present, and 26.0% were non-families. 21.1% of all households were made up of individuals, and 7% had someone living alone who was 65 years of age or older. The average household size was 2.67 and the average family size was 3.05.

The median age in the town was 38.2 years. 28% of residents were under the age of 18; 8.1% were between the ages of 18 and 24; 24.2% were from 25 to 44; 30% were from 45 to 64; and 9.7% were 65 years of age or older. The gender makeup of the town was 49.4% male and 50.6% female.

=== 2000 census ===
As of the census of 2000, there were 618 people, 232 households, and 179 families residing in the town. The population density was 2,795.4 inhabitants per square mile (1,079.3/km^{2}). There were 243 housing units at an average density of 1,099.1 per square mile (424.4/km^{2}). The racial makeup of the town was 98.54% White, 0.32% African American, 0.16% Asian, 0.32% Pacific Islander, 0.49% from other races, and 0.16% from two or more races. Hispanic or Latino of any race were 1.29% of the population.

There were 232 households, out of which 40.5% had children under the age of 18 living with them, 62.9% were married couples living together, 10.8% had a female householder with no husband present, and 22.8% were non-families. 19.4% of all households were made up of individuals, and 10.8% had someone living alone who was 65 years of age or older. The average household size was 2.66 and the average family size was 3.03.

In the town, the population was spread out, with 28.5% under the age of 18, 6.6% from 18 to 24, 33.0% from 25 to 44, 20.9% from 45 to 64, and 11.0% who were 65 years of age or older. The median age was 35 years. For every 100 females, there were 96.2 males. For every 100 females age 18 and over, there were 92.2 males.

The median income for a household in the town was $52,292, and the median income for a family was $58,750. Males had a median income of $46,389 versus $30,417 for females. The per capita income for the town was $22,480. About 1.2% of families and 2.8% of the population were below the poverty line, including 1.4% of those under age 18 and none of those age 65 or over.

== Economy ==
Historically, agriculture was the primary industry in Sharpsville. Corn and wheat were popular crops. Reuben Jackson opened the first general store in the south part of Sharpsville. That store closed, and another store was opened in 1853 by Madison and Washington Grishaw. That store was destroyed by fire in 1856, however, many other merchants opened up shop in Sharpsville, with over 15 merchants in the town by the start of the American Civil War. By 1873, the town had two blacksmith shops. In 1902 The Sharpsville Bank was chartered.

=== Manufacturing and industry ===
In the early 20th century, the Sharpsville Canning Company was the largest employer, followed by a flour mill and a lumber yard.

Sharpsville was home to G.W. Invader Corporation, a boat manufacturer, owned and operated from the early 1960s through 1980s by Arne Gray and George Wooldridge.

=== Tourism ===
The first hotel to open in Sharpsville was in 1853. By the 1860s there were three hotels in town.

== Infrastructure ==
=== Utilities ===
Sharpsville is provided natural gas by Northern Indiana Public Service Co. (NIPSCO), a division of NiSource. Electric energy is provided by Duke Energy. Water and Sewage is supplied by the Sharpsville Water Utilities Department.

=== Healthcare ===
Sharpsville has two hospitals within a 10-mile radius, Community Howard Regional Health and Indiana University Health Tipton Hospital.

== Education ==
Students in Sharpsville attend Tri-Central Community Schools.

== Public safety ==
Law enforcement in the town is provided by the Sharpsville Marshal's Office and the Tipton County Sheriff's Office. Fire and Emergency Medical Services are provided by the Sharpsville Volunteer Fire Department and the Sharpsville Ambulance Service.
