= Gaston, Indiana =

- Town
- Town of Gaston
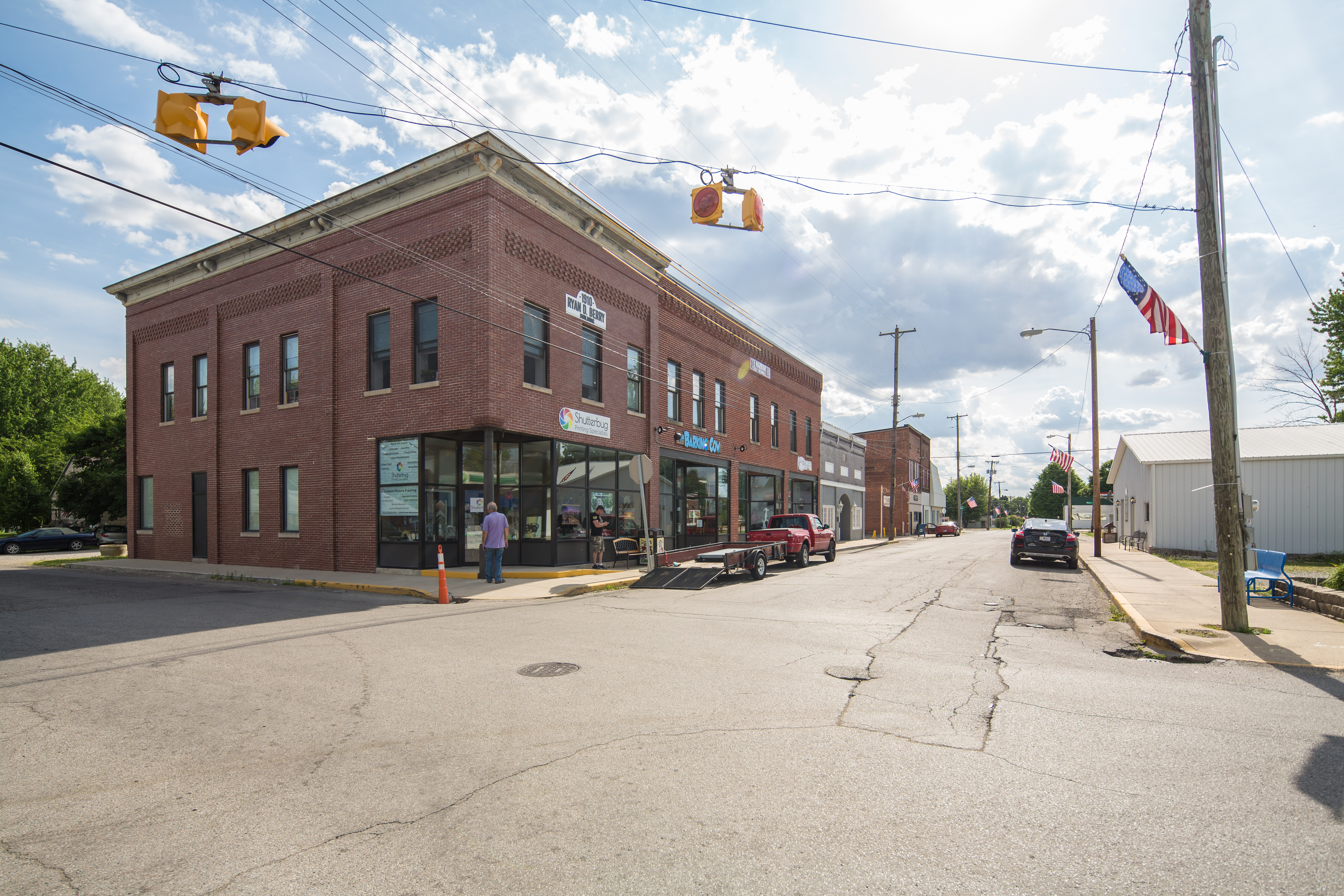
- Downtown Gaston

- Location of Gaston in Delaware County, Indiana.
- Coordinates: 40°18′49″N 85°29′57″W
- Country: United States
- State: Indiana
- County: Delaware
- Township: Washington
- Founded: 1855
- Incorporated: 1904
- Founder: David L. Jones

Area
  - Total: 0.36 sq mi (0.94 km^{2})
  - Land: 0.36 sq mi (0.94 km^{2})
  - Water: 0 sq mi (0.00 km^{2})
- Elevation: 896 ft (273 m)

Population (2020)
  - Total: 796
  - Estimate (2025): 798 ▲
  - Density: 2,193.2/sq mi (846.81/km^{2})
- Time zone: UTC-5 (EST)
  - Summer (DST): UTC-5 (EST)
- ZIP code: 47342
- Area code: 765
- FIPS code: 18-27072
- GNIS feature ID: 2396955
- Website: townofgaston.in.gov

Gaston is a town in Washington Township, Delaware County, Indiana, United States. The population was 796 at the 2020 census. It is part of the Muncie Metropolitan Statistical Area.

== History ==
Gaston was originally called Snag Town and then New Corner, and under the former name was platted on February 27, 1855, by David L. Jones. The name Gaston was adopted when the railroad was built through the town in 1901 during a local gas boom. In late 1904, Gaston was officially incorporated as a town.

Gaston currently has a preschool, elementary, and high school in the Wes-Del community school district. It also has a few churches, an ice cream parlor/restaurant called The Barking Cow, a funeral home and a few cemeteries located outside of the town center, a volunteer fire department and police department, a Dollar General and several small businesses. The town has also had a newspaper, The Voice, which was released every other week until it was discontinued in May 2016 after producing a total of 8 volumes and 124 newspapers for over 10 years. Wes-Del Middle/High School has produced WDN, a weekly video featuring students reporting the current events occurring in the school, and released it on YouTube. Wes-Del Middle/High School also became the first school to let students work on personal projects to be released to the school if desired and give out awards red carpet style in 2016.

The motorcade transporting Vice President Mike Pence and Karen Pence passed through Gaston on May 18, 2019. The motorcade passed in front of Wes-Del High School where contestants and volunteers in the school's first color run had gathered and the vice president was saluted by volunteer fireman and Gaston police as he made his way to deliver a speech at Taylor University's graduation. He also delivered a speech at the nearby Delta High School.

Gaston is hoping to grow by opening new businesses and attractions. The town is hoping to reach a population goal of 2,500 by 2025.

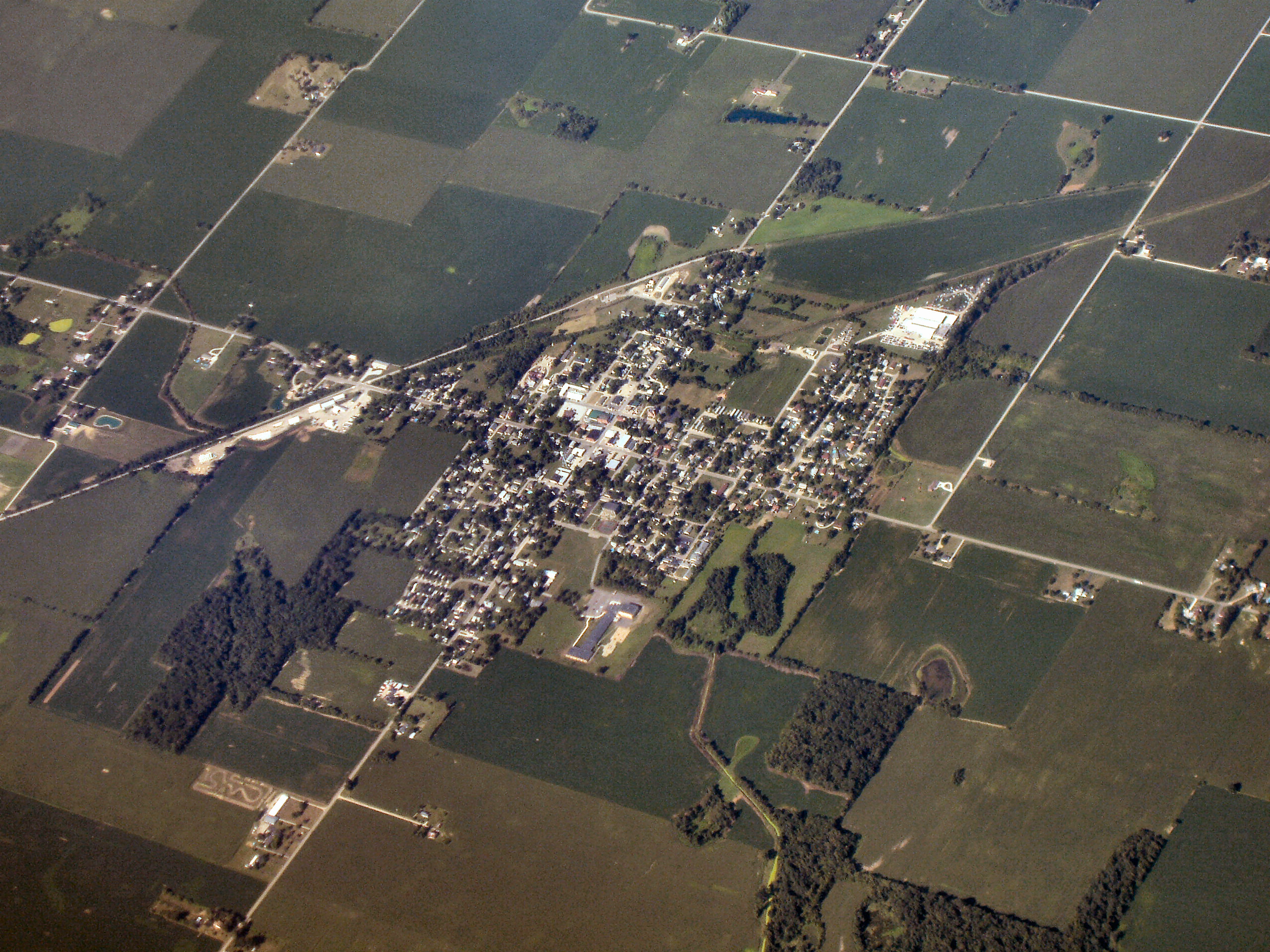
Gaston from the northeast.

== Geography ==
According to the 2010 census, Gaston has a total area of 0.35 square miles (0.91 km^{2}), all land.

== Demographics ==
Historical population
Census	Pop.	Note	%±
1910	638		—
1920	541		−15.2%
1930	654		20.9%
1940	677		3.5%
1950	729		7.7%
1960	801		9.9%
1970	928		15.9%
1980	1,150		23.9%
1990	979		−14.9%
2000	1,010		3.2%
2010	871		−13.8%
2020	796		−8.6%
2025 (est.)	798	▲	0.3%
U.S. Decennial Census

=== 2020 census ===
As of the census of 2020, there were 796 people, 351 households, and 138 families living in the town. The population density was 2,211.1 inhabitants per square mile (853.7/km^{2}). There were 378 housing units at an average density of 1,050.0 per square mile (405.4/km^{2}). The racial makeup of the town was 93.0% White, 0.4% African American, 0.3% Asian, 0.8% from other races, and 5.3% from two or more races. Hispanic or Latino of any race were 3.3% of the population.

There were 351 households, of which 32.4% had children under the age of 18 living with them, 48.1% were married couples living together, 24.1% had a female householder with no husband present, 16.1% had a male householder with no wife present, and 11.7% were non-families. 40.2% of all households were made up of individuals. The average household size was 2.27 and the average family size was 3.23.

24.3% of the population had never been married. 50.7% of residents were married and not separated, 7.2% were widowed, 16.5% were divorced, and 1.3% were separated.

The median age in the town was 35.9. 5.1% of residents were under the age of 5; 32.4% of residents were under the age of 18; 67.6% were age 18 or older; and 17.8% were age 65 or older. 7.4% of the population were veterans.

The most common language spoken at home was English with 97.3% speaking it at home, 1.8% spoke Spanish at home and 0.9% spoke an Asian or Pacific Islander language at home. 1.7% of the population were foreign born.

The median household income in Gaston was $47,250, 18.9% less than the median average for the state of Indiana. 16.9% of the population were in poverty, including 20% of residents under the age of 18. The poverty rate for the town was 4% higher than that of the state. 17.6% of the population were disabled and 6.5% had no healthcare coverage. 38.1% of the population had attained a high school or equivalent degree, 29.4% had attended college but received no degree, 6.5% had attained an Associate's degree or higher, 11.6% had attained a Bachelor's degree or higher, and 3.9% had a graduate or professional degree. 10.5% had no degree. 59.6% of Gaston residents were employed, working a mean of 38.1 hours per week. The median gross rent in Gaston was $736 and the homeownership rate was 81.6%. 27 housing units were vacant at a density of 75 per square mile (29.0/km^{2}).

=== 2010 census ===
As of the census of 2010, there were 871 people, 331 households, and 230 families living in the town. The population density was 2,488.6 inhabitants per square mile (960.9/km^{2}). There were 392 housing units at an average density of 1,120.0 per square mile (432.4/km^{2}). The racial makeup of the town was 97.0% White, 0.1% African American, 0.1% Asian, 0.6% from other races, and 2.2% from two or more races. Hispanic or Latino of any race were 2.9% of the population.

There were 331 households, of which 42.9% had children under the age of 18 living with them, 44.7% were married couples living together, 18.4% had a female householder with no husband present, 6.3% had a male householder with no wife present, and 30.5% were non-families. 24.2% of all households were made up of individuals, and 8.1% had someone living alone who was 65 years of age or older. The average household size was 2.63 and the average family size was 3.06.

The median age in the town was 34.4 years. 29.6% of residents were under the age of 18; 7.8% were between the ages of 18 and 24; 28.4% were from 25 to 44; 23.8% were from 45 to 64; and 10.3% were 65 years of age or older. The gender makeup of the town was 48.0% male and 52.0% female.

=== 2000 census ===
As of the census of 2000, there were 1,010 people, 351 households, and 261 families living in the town. The population density was 2,881.0 inhabitants per square mile (1,112.4/km^{2}). There were 376 housing units at an average density of 1,072.5 per square mile (414.1/km^{2}). The racial makeup of the town was 98.22% White, 0.59% African American, and 1.19% from two or more races. Hispanic or Latino of any race were 0.20% of the population.

There were 351 households, out of which 44.4% had children under the age of 18 living with them, 51.3% were married couples living together, 17.4% had a female householder with no husband present, and 25.4% were non-families. 21.1% of all households were made up of individuals, and 9.1% had someone living alone who was 65 years of age or older. The average household size was 2.67 and the average family size was 3.06.

In the town, the population was spread out, with 29.7% under the age of 18, 6.3% from 18 to 24, 31.6% from 25 to 44, 22.2% from 45 to 64, and 10.2% who were 65 years of age or older. The median age was 34 years. For every 100 females, there were 102.4 males. For every 100 females age 18 and over, there were 100.6 males.

The median income for a household in the town was $31,853, and the median income for a family was $37,583. Males had a median income of $28,558 versus $23,281 for females. The per capita income for the town was $15,357. About 10.5% of families and 11.8% of the population were below the poverty line, including 18.3% of those under age 18 and 6.4% of those age 65 or over.

== Education ==
It is in the Wes-Del Community Schools. Wes-Del Middle/High School is the comprehensive secondary school.

In 1957 there was a school in Gaston, and there was proposed new elementary and high school facility to replace it.
