= Wes-Del Middle/High School =

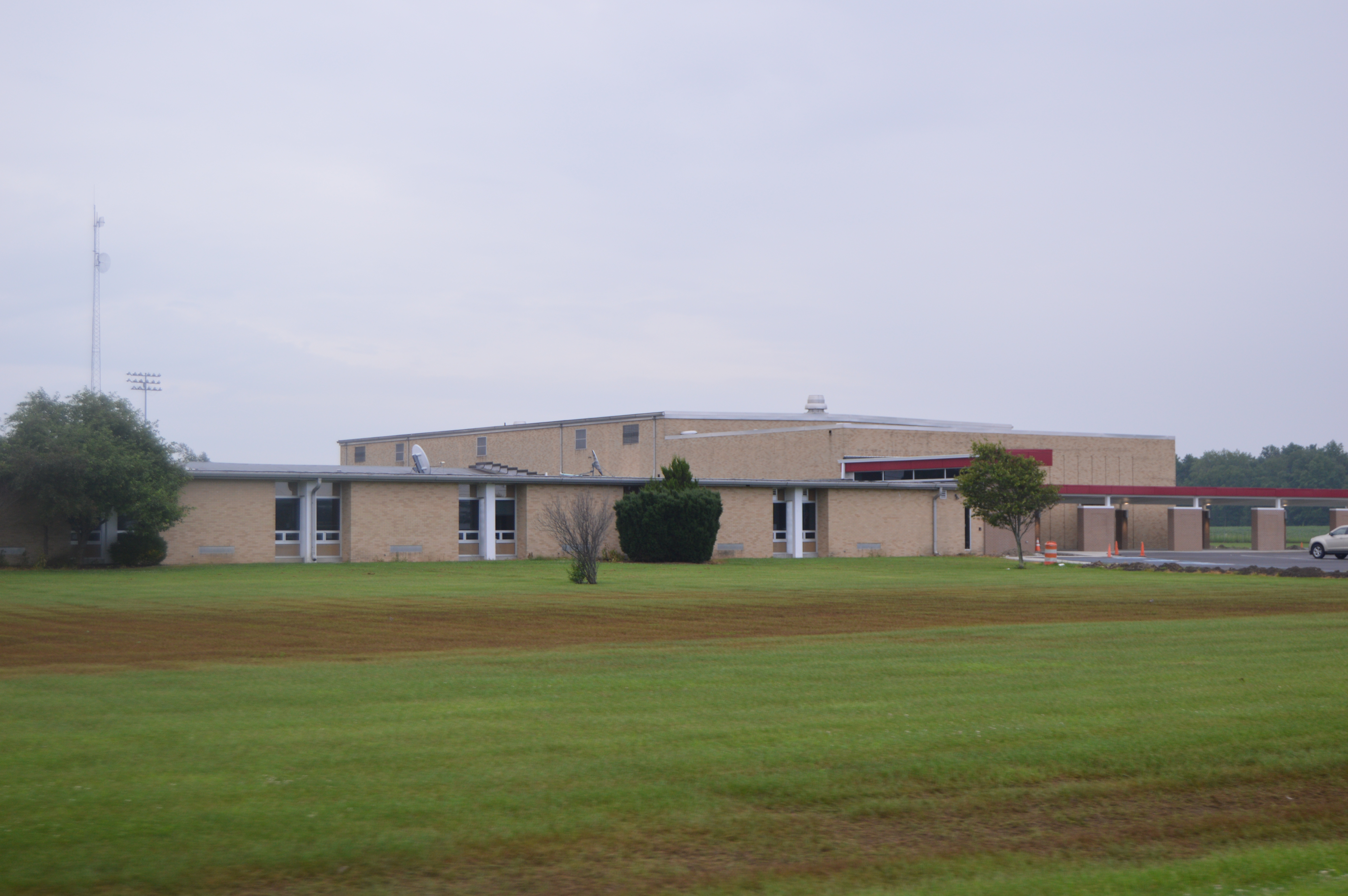

Location
- Gaston, Indiana 47342; 40°16′48.4″N 85°29′58.6″W

Information
- Type: public middle and high school.
- Established: 1966 (high school); 1974 (middle school added)
- School district: Wes-Del Community Schools Corporation
- Principal: Adam Perdue
- Grades: 6-12
- Enrollment: 451 (2023-2024)
- Colors: Maroon and White
- Mascot: Warrior
- Nicknames: "The Warriors", WDHS
- Website: www.wes-del.k12.in.us

Wes-Del Middle/High School is in Indiana. It has 457 pupils from grades 6–12 as of 2020 and about 31 certified teachers as of May 25, 2017. It is a part of the Wes-Del Community Schools school district, which includes Gaston and small pieces of Muncie. 5,141 (2022)

== History ==
The school building was built in 1966, and the middle school wing was added in 1974. The school was a part of Harrison-Washington Community Schools Corporation from 1966 until the corporation changed its name to Wes-Del Community Schools Corporation in 2004.

The town of Gaston has had a newspaper, The Voice of the Wes-Del Community, and featured mostly articles pertaining to the school and its alumni, even including articles written by high school students. The newspaper was created and run by a former Wes-Del graduate. which was released every other week until it was discontinued in May 2016 after producing a total of 8 volumes and 124 newspapers for over 10 years.

Wes-Del has produced Wes-Del News (WDN), also known WD-TV, a weekly video series featuring students reporting the current events occurring in the school, and released it on YouTube. Wes-Del Middle/High School also became the first school to let students work on personal projects to be released to the school if desired and give out awards red carpet style in 2016.

During the 2018–19 school year, a sixth grade academy was implemented in a separate wing of the school designated for that purpose.

Wes-Del Community Schools has undertaken several infrastructure improvements, including the construction of a field house, football field, softball fields, baseball fields, and a post-tensioned track. The district also participates in Project Lead The Way (PLTW) STEM programs. According to available district data, its high school graduation rate has exceeded 95%, while its post-secondary education rate has exceeded 70%.
