= Delta High School (Indiana) =

Public high school in Delaware County, Indiana, U.S.

Location
- 3400 E. State Road 28; Muncie, Indiana; United States; 40°16′44″N 85°20′54″W

Information
- Other name: University of Delta High School
- Type: Public
- Established: 1967
- School district: Delaware Community School Corporation
- Principal: Joey Gossett
- Teaching staff: 60.95 (on an FTE basis)
- Grades: 9 to 12
- Enrollment: 848 (2024–2025)
- Student to teacher ratio: 13.91
- Color
- Athletics conference: IHSAA District 2 Hoosier Heritage Conference
- Mascot: Eagle
- Website: Delta High School Website

Delta High School is a public high school located northeast of Muncie in Hamilton Township, Delaware County, Indiana, United States. The school serves about 800 students in grades 9 to 12. It is a part of the Delaware Community School Corporation. The school district, of which this is the sole comprehensive high school, includes Eaton, most of Albany, a small piece of Muncie, DeSoto, and Royerton.

Delta High School is a member of the IHSAA. The school's mascot is the Eagle and the school's colors are navy blue, gold, and white. Delta High School is part of the Hoosier Heritage Conference.

== History ==
Delta High School opened in 1967 as the consolidation of the three high schools — DeSoto, Eaton, and Royerton — in the newly formed Delaware Metropolitan School District (name changed to Delaware Community School Corporation in 1973). Classes were originally held in the former Royerton High School building. During the 1967–68 school year, a committee of students was given the task of selecting a name for the high school, as well as the colors, mascot, and school song. "Delta" was chosen because it consisted primarily of letters that the names of the previous high schools and "Delaware" had in common.

Construction of the current building started in 1972 and completed in 1974. The new building cost $7 million and had 213,000 square feet (19,800 m^{2}). The increased space allowed Albany High School to join the consolidation. In August 1974, Albany High closed, and its students were sent to Delta High.

Delta High School was remodeled in 1992. It was remodeled again in 2007 due to a mold problem.

== Campus ==
An athletics center is in the high school. It had a total cost of $6,000,000. It opened in 2021.

== Academics ==
The school has an early college program called the "University of Delta High School".

== Notable alumni ==
- Matt Painter - varsity basketball player, assistant coach, and, later, head coach at Purdue University
- John Paul Jr. - IMSA Racing Champion, IndyCar driver, 2 time Rolex 24 Hours of Daytona Winner

== See also ==
- List of high schools in Indiana
