= Yorktown High School (Yorktown, Indiana) =

Location
- 1100 South Tiger Drive; Yorktown, Delaware County, Indiana 47396; United States
- 40.183124°N 85.493769°W

Information
- Type: Public high school
- School district: Yorktown Community Schools
- Principal: Stacey Brewer
- Teaching staff: 48.50 (FTE)
- Grades: 9-12
- Enrollment: 839 (2024–2025)
- Student to teacher ratio: 17.30
- Colors: Green, black, and white
- Team name: Tigers
- Website: Official Website

Yorktown High School is a National Blue Ribbon high school located in Yorktown, Indiana. It is managed by the Yorktown Community School Corporation.

The school was one of the six 'Head of Class' selections by the Indiana Chamber Of Commerce, for 2005, for their exemplary efforts. The six schools were selected from the 345 high schools in the state.

== Athletics ==
The school is a member of the Hoosier Heritage Conference. Their mascot is the tiger.

The school offers the following IHSAA sanctioned sports:

- Baseball
- Boys' Basketball
- Girls' Basketball
- Boys' Cross Country
- Girls' Cross Country
- Football
- Boys' Golf
  - State champs - 1974
- Girls' Golf
  - State champs - 1976, 2012
- Boys' Soccer
- Girls' Soccer
- Softball
- Boys' Swimming and Diving
- Girls' Swimming and Diving
- Boys' Tennis
- Girls' Tennis
- Boys' Track and Field
- Girls' Track and Field
- Volleyball
  - State champs - 2000, 2011, 2016, 2018, 2020
- Wrestling

== See also ==
- List of high schools in Indiana
