= Yorktown, Indiana =

- Town
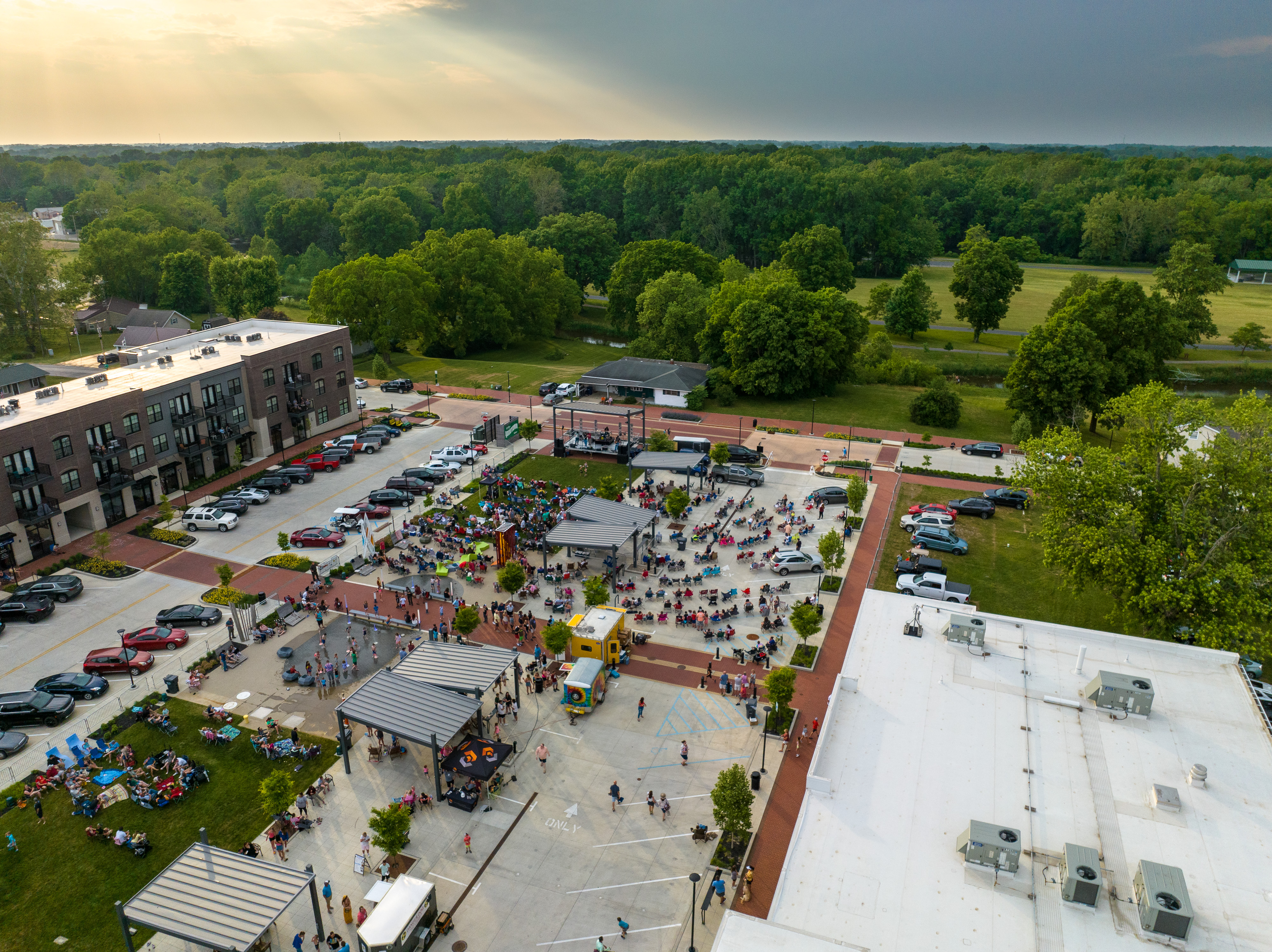
- Aerial view of Yorktown.

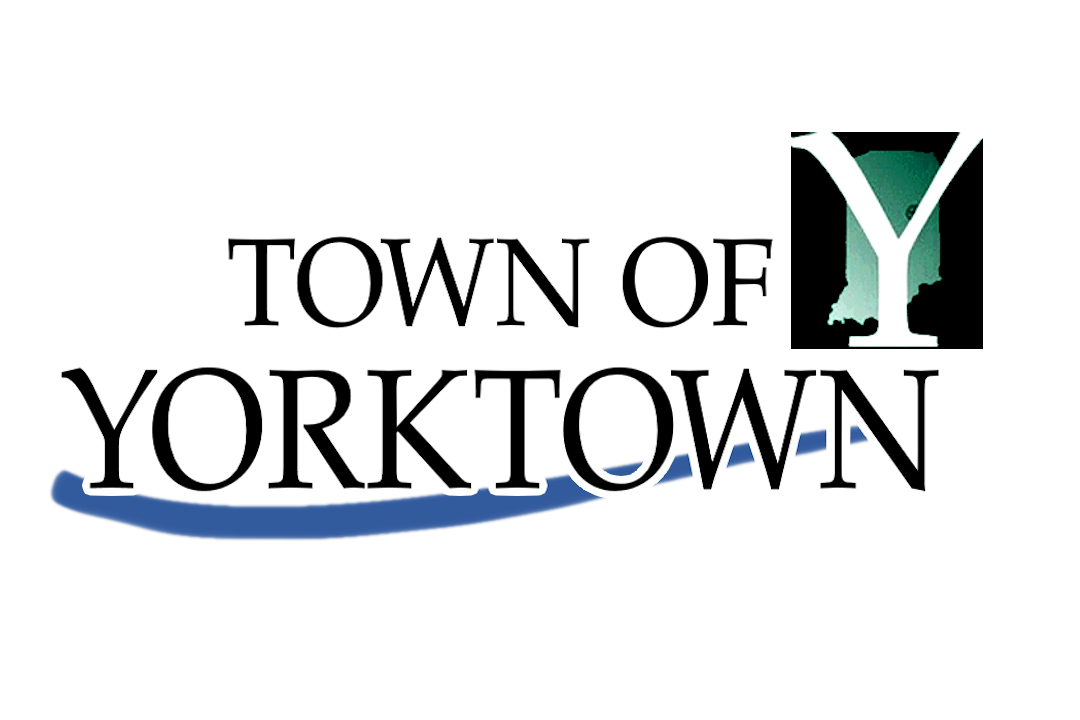
- Flag

- Location of Yorktown in Delaware County, Indiana.
- Coordinates: 40°10′55″N 85°29′55″W
- Country: United States
- State: Indiana
- County: Delaware
- Township: Mount Pleasant

Government
  - Town Manager: Chase Bruton

Area
  - Total: 32.17 sq mi (83.32 km^{2})
  - Land: 31.93 sq mi (82.70 km^{2})
  - Water: 0.24 sq mi (0.62 km^{2})
- Elevation: 909 ft (277 m)

Population (2020)
  - Total: 11,548
  - Estimate (2025): 11,818 ▲
  - Density: 361.7/sq mi (139.64/km^{2})
- Demonym: Yorktownian
- Time zone: UTC-5 (Eastern (EST))
  - Summer (DST): UTC-4 (EDT)
- ZIP code: 47396
- Area code: 765
- FIPS code: 18-86084
- GNIS feature ID: 2397759
- Website: www.yorktownindiana.org

Yorktown is a town in Mount Pleasant Township, Delaware County, Indiana, United States. The population was 11,548 at the 2020 census. It is part of the Muncie, Indiana Metropolitan Statistical Area.

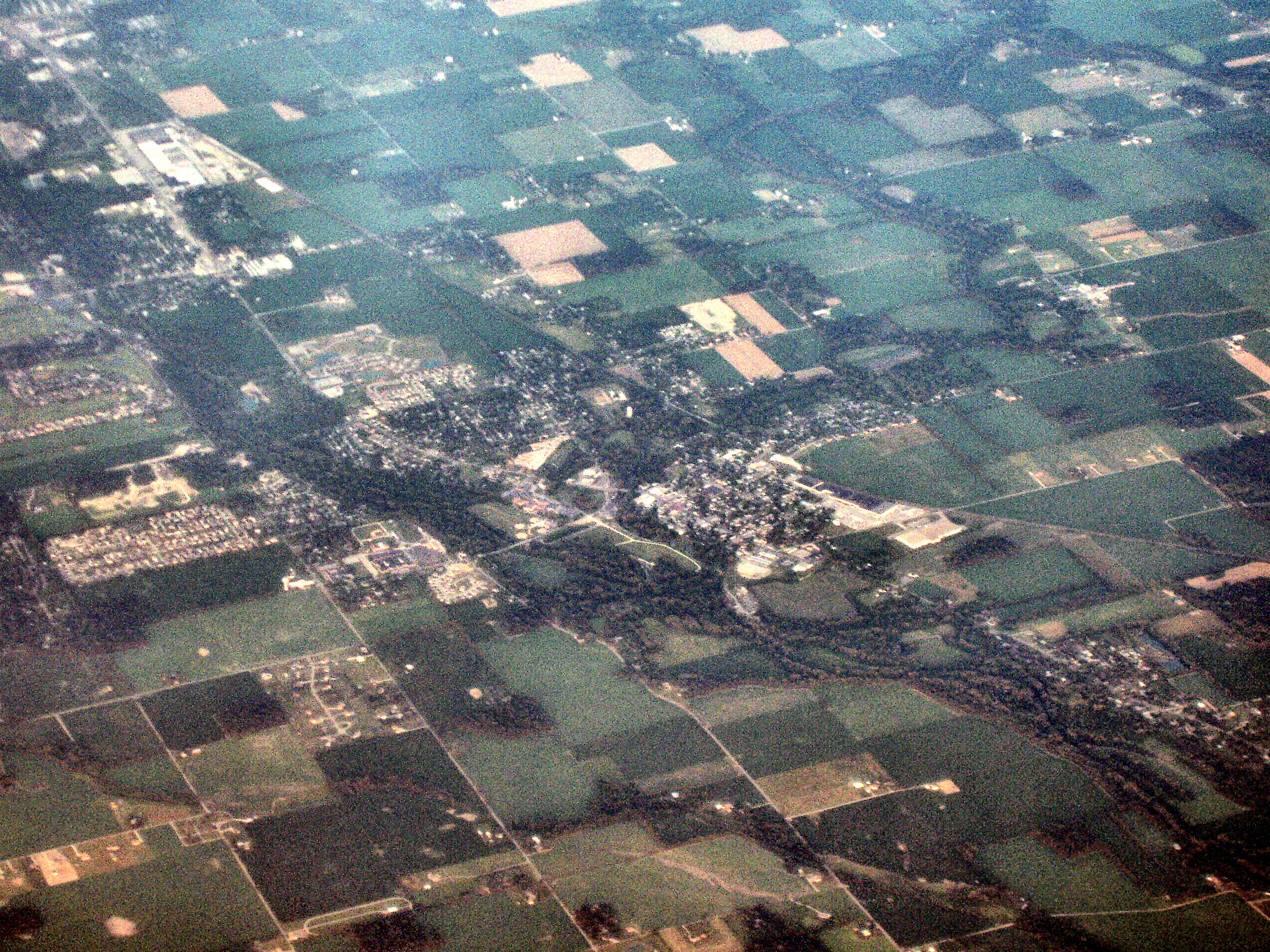
Yorktown from the air, looking east.

== History ==
During the Woodland period Native Americans built an earthen enclosure just to the east of Yorktown, still visible on Google Earth at 40.1805°N 85.4694°W. Yorktown lies at the junction of the White River and Buck Creek. According to local legend, the Miami Indians believed that the peculiar configuration of the junction made Yorktown immune from tornadoes.

Yorktown was platted in 1837 by Oliver H. Smith who represented Indiana in the U.S. Senate from 1837 to 1843 and was a member of the Committee on Public Lands. Smith eventually became involved in the railroad business, and Yorktown was joined to Indianapolis by railroad in the early 1850s. Yorktown's main street bears Smith's name.

Yorktown benefited from the 1880s natural gas boom in the area, and was the site of several glass factories in the late nineteenth and early twentieth centuries. (The gas gave names to nearby the towns of Gaston and Gas City and drew the Ball Brothers to Muncie.)

In 1892, a developer platted "West Muncie" on land immediately adjacent to Yorktown (but roughly ten miles from Muncie). Buck Creek was dammed to form "Lake Delaware" which became the focus of a 73-room resort hotel opened in 1893. However, the dam ruptured within a few years and the entire West Muncie project was abandoned. Its most enduring legacy was perhaps that Yorktown was erroneously labeled "West Muncie" on some road maps into the 1960s and perhaps later, puzzling most local residents, who had neither seen nor heard the name in any other context.

The town has been served by the Big Four Railroad and its successors: the New York Central, Penn Central, Conrail and CSX. The town was also served by an electric interurban line, the Union Traction Company of Indiana and its successor Indiana Railroad, in the early twentieth century.

In the mid twentieth century, many residents found employment in automotive plants in nearby Muncie and Anderson, most associated with General Motors. General Motors in Muncie, closed down in 2003. Borg Warner in Yorktown closed in 2009. Yorktown also served as corporate headquarters of the Marsh Supermarkets chain from 1952 until 1991, a fact reflected in the chain's "Yorktown" store brand. Marsh Supermarkets and Village Pantry headquarters relocated in Indianapolis until Marsh went bankrupt and shut down in 2017.

Former Yorktown Clerk-Treasurer Beth Neff was the defendant in high-profile court proceedings (State of Indiana v. Beth A. Neff, 18S-IF-478) that saw the Indiana Supreme Court clarify state statutes relating to the conditions under which Indiana judiciaries may remove publicly elected municipal officials from office.

== Geography ==
According to the 2010 census, Yorktown has a total area of 8.863 square miles (22.96 km^{2}), of which 8.78 square miles (22.74 km^{2}) (or 99.06%) is land and 0.083 square miles (0.21 km^{2}) (or 0.94%) is water.

== Demographics ==
Historical population
| Census | Pop. | Note | %± |
|---|---|---|---|
| 1880 | 331 | | — |
| 1920 | 797 | | — |
| 1930 | 909 | | 14.1% |
| 1940 | 906 | | −0.3% |
| 1950 | 1,109 | | 22.4% |
| 1960 | 1,137 | | 2.5% |
| 1970 | 1,673 | | 47.1% |
| 1980 | 3,945 | | 135.8% |
| 1990 | 4,106 | | 4.1% |
| 2000 | 4,785 | | 16.5% |
| 2010 | 9,405 | | 96.6% |
| 2020 | 11,548 | | 22.8% |
| 2025 (est.) | 11,818 | ▲ | 2.3% |
U.S. Decennial Census

=== 2020 census ===
As of the 2020 census, there were 11,548 people, 4,568 households, and 2,832 families living in the town. The median age was 42.4 years. 24.5% of residents were under the age of 18 and 20.7% of residents were 65 years of age or older. For every 100 females there were 94.2 males, and for every 100 females age 18 and over there were 92.2 males age 18 and over.

84.4% of residents lived in urban areas, while 15.6% lived in rural areas.

There were 4,568 households in Yorktown, of which 33.2% had children under the age of 18 living in them. Of all households, 58.4% were married-couple households, 13.4% were households with a male householder and no spouse or partner present, and 22.5% were households with a female householder and no spouse or partner present. About 22.7% of all households were made up of individuals and 12.1% had someone living alone who was 65 years of age or older. 18.6% of the population had never been married. 60.6% of residents were married and not separated, 4.7% were widowed, 15.7% were divorced, and 0.5% were separated.

The average household size was 2.53 and the average family size was 2.91.

The population density was 353.1 inhabitants per square mile (136.3/km^{2}), and the housing unit density was 147.31 units per square mile (56.88 units/km^{2}). There were 4,817 housing units, of which 5.2% were vacant. The homeowner vacancy rate was 1.4% and the rental vacancy rate was 6.5%.

Racial composition as of the 2020 census
| Race | Number | Percent |
|---|---|---|
| White | 10,419 | 90.2% |
| Black or African American | 223 | 1.9% |
| American Indian and Alaska Native | 17 | 0.1% |
| Asian | 285 | 2.5% |
| Native Hawaiian and Other Pacific Islander | 8 | 0.1% |
| Some other race | 69 | 0.6% |
| Two or more races | 527 | 4.6% |
| Hispanic or Latino (of any race) | 236 | 2.0% |

=== Demographic estimates ===
6.5% of residents were under the age of 5, and 7.2% of the population were veterans. The most common language spoken at home was English with 97.0% speaking it at home, 1.5% spoke another Indo-European language at home and 1.5% spoke an Asian or Pacific Islander language at home. 2.7% of the population were foreign born.

=== Income and poverty ===
8.7% of the population were in poverty, including 14.2% of residents under the age of 18. The poverty rate for the town was 4.2% lower than that of the state. 11.7% of the population was disabled and 4.2% had no healthcare coverage. 21.3% of the population had attained a high school or equivalent degree, 27.1% had attended college but received no degree, 12.9% had attained an Associate's degree or higher, 18.6% had attained a Bachelor's degree or higher, and 14.0% had a graduate or professional degree. 6.1% had no degree. 63.0% of Yorktown residents were employed, working a mean of 36.8 hours per week. The median gross rent in Yorktown was $755 and the homeownership rate was 85.6%.

=== 2010 census ===
As of the census of 2010, there were 9,405 people, 3,648 households, and 2,726 families living in the town. The population density was 1,071.2 inhabitants per square mile (413.6/km^{2}). There were 3,929 housing units at an average density of 447.5 units per square mile (172.8 units/km^{2}). The racial makeup of the town was 95.3% White, 1.6% African American, 0.2% Native American, 1.5% Asian, 0.4% from other races, and 1.0% from two or more races. Hispanic or Latino of any race were 1.3% of the population.

There were 3,648 households, of which 34.6% had children under the age of 18 living with them, 59.9% were married couples living together, 10.9% had a female householder with no husband present, 3.9% had a male householder with no wife present, and 25.3% were non-families. 21.2% of all households were made up of individuals, and 9.9% had someone living alone who was 65 years of age or older. The average household size was 2.55 and the average family size was 2.95.

The median age in the town was 41.2 years. 25.7% of residents were under the age of 18; 6.6% were between the ages of 18 and 24; 22.9% were from 25 to 44; 27.7% were from 45 to 64; and 17% were 65 years of age or older. The gender makeup of the town was 47.5% male and 52.5% female.

=== 2000 census ===
As of the census of 2000, there were 4,785 people, 1,842 households, and 1,368 families living in the town. The population density was 1,357.0 inhabitants per square mile (523.9/km^{2}). There were 1,940 housing units at an average density of 550.2 units per square mile (212.4 units/km^{2}). The racial makeup of the town was 97.64% White, 0.96% African American, 0.15% Native American, 0.36% Asian, 0.23% from other races, and 0.67% from two or more races. Hispanic or Latino of any race were 0.73% of the population.

There were 1,842 households, out of which 37.5% had children under the age of 18 living with them, 61.5% were married couples living together, 10.2% had a female householder with no husband present, and 25.7% were non-families. 21.8% of all households were made up of individuals, and 8.6% had someone living alone who was 65 years of age or older. The average household size was 2.53 and the average family size was 2.96.

In the town, the population was spread out, with 26.7% under the age of 18, 7.2% from 18 to 24, 29.0% from 25 to 44, 23.6% from 45 to 64, and 13.5% who were 65 years of age or older. The median age was 37 years. For every 100 females, there were 91.4 males. For every 100 females age 18 and over, there were 87.4 males.

The median income for a household in the town was $50,974, and the median income for a family was $58,784. Males had a median income of $41,346 versus $26,611 for females. The per capita income for the town was $26,065. About 3.9% of families and 4.1% of the population were below the poverty line, including 6.0% of those under age 18 and 4.3% of those age 65 or over.

== Education ==
=== Elementary schools ===
- Pleasant View Elementary (Grade K-2)
- Yorktown Elementary School (Grades 3–5)

=== Middle schools ===
- Yorktown Middle School (Grades 6–8)

=== High schools ===
- Yorktown High School

The town has a free lending library, the Yorktown Public Library.

== Notable people ==
- Ted Haggard, prominent Evangelical Christian, grew up in Yorktown.
- Jack Parkinson, All-American (2nd Team) Basketball player at the University of Kentucky.
- Jonathon Newby, founding member of music group Brazil grew up in Yorktown.
