= National Register of Historic Places listings in Miami County, Indiana =

Location of Miami County in Indiana

This is a list of the National Register of Historic Places listings in Miami County, Indiana.

This is intended to be a complete list of the properties on the National Register of Historic Places in Miami County, Indiana, United States. Latitude and longitude coordinates are provided for many National Register properties; these locations may be seen together in a map.

There are 17 properties listed on the National Register in the county, including one National Historic Landmark. One property was listed, but has since been removed.

Properties and districts located in incorporated areas display the name of the municipality, while properties and districts in unincorporated areas display the name of their civil township. Properties and districts split between multiple jurisdictions display the names of all jurisdictions.

This National Park Service list is complete through NPS recent listings posted September 26, 2025.

== Current listings ==
	Name on the Register	Image	Date listed	Location	City or town	Description
1	B-17G "Flying Fortress" No. 44-83690	B-17G "Flying Fortress" No. 44-83690	June 29, 1993 (#93000540)	Heritage Museum Foundation, off U.S. Route 31 at Grissom Air Force Base; 40°40′06″N 86°07′46″W	Pipe Creek Township	Relocated to the Museum of Aviation in Warner Robins, Georgia in 2015
2	Brownell Block/Senger Dry Goods Company Building	Brownell Block/Senger Dry Goods Company Building	September 1, 1983 (#83000007)	Broadway and 5th Sts. 40°45′18″N 86°04′10″W	Peru	
3	James Omar Cole House	James Omar Cole House	March 1, 1984 (#84001198)	27 E. 3rd St. 40°45′12″N 86°04′00″W	Peru	
4	Converse Commercial Historic District	Converse Commercial Historic District	December 27, 2016 (#16000907)	4 blocks along Jefferson between Marion and 1st Sts., and 1 block of E. Railroad St. 40°34′45″N 85°52′24″W	Converse	
5	Converse Depot	Converse Depot	March 3, 1995 (#95000205)	203 E. Railroad St. 40°34′49″N 85°52′14″W	Converse	
6	Converse-Jackson Township Public Library	Converse-Jackson Township Public Library	March 12, 1999 (#99000298)	100 S. Jefferson St. 40°34′39″N 85°52′26″W	Converse	
7	Eikenberry Bridge	Eikenberry Bridge	September 20, 2006 (#06000848)	County Road 100E over the Eel River, southwest of Chili; 40°51′19″N 86°03′21″W	Richland Township	
8	Godfroy's Addition Historic District		August 30, 2023 (#100009293)	Roughly bounded by Ewing, 6th, Water, Canal, and Wabash Sts., and Clay St. between Main and 2nd Sts. 40°45′22″N 86°04′00″W	Peru	
9	Francis Godfroy Cemetery	Francis Godfroy Cemetery	March 1, 1984 (#84001203)	State Road 124, east of Peru; 40°45′03″N 85°59′35″W	Butler Township	
10	Terrell Jacobs Circus Winter Quarters	Terrell Jacobs Circus Winter Quarters	April 5, 2012 (#12000188)	6125 U.S. Route 31, south of Peru; 40°40′36″N 86°07′38″W	Pipe Creek Township	Demolished in 2021
11	Miami County Courthouse	Miami County Courthouse	March 19, 2008 (#08000194)	Public Square; 40°45′16″N 86°04′08″W	Peru	
12	Peru Courthouse Square Historic District	Peru Courthouse Square Historic District	May 23, 2018 (#100002492)	Roughly bounded by the Wabash River and Wabash, 7th, and Miami Sts. 40°45′10″N 86°04′06″W	Peru	
13	Peru High School Historic District	Peru High School Historic District	January 9, 2013 (#12001154)	80 W. 6th St. 40°45′16″N 86°04′24″W	Peru	
14	Peru Westside Historic District		August 30, 2023 (#100009296)	Roughly bounded by 6th, Miami, 3rd, and Lafayette Sts. 40°45′07″N 86°04′33″W	Peru	
15	Shirk-Edwards House	Shirk-Edwards House	September 14, 1995 (#95001109)	50 N. Hood St. 40°45′08″N 86°04′30″W	Peru	
16	Wallace Circus and American Circus Corporation Winter Quarters	Wallace Circus and American Circus Corporation Winter Quarters	February 27, 1987 (#87000837)	2.5 miles (4.0 km) southeast of Peru; 40°45′16″N 86°01′11″W	Butler Township	
17	Westleigh Farms	Westleigh Farms	September 28, 2003 (#03000976)	2107 S. Frances Slocum Trail, east of Peru; 40°44′06″N 86°00′18″W	Butler Township	

== Former listing ==
	Name on the Register	Image	Date listed	Date removed	Location	City or town	Description
1	Paw Paw Creek Bridge No. 52	Paw Paw Creek Bridge No. 52	September 30, 1983 (#83000008)	October 13, 2015	Paw Paw Pike, northeast of Chili; 40°52′42″N 85°57′59″W	Richland Township	Bridge was disassembled after a tree fell on it.

== See also ==
- List of National Historic Landmarks in Indiana
- National Register of Historic Places listings in Indiana
- Listings in neighboring counties: Cass, Fulton, Grant, Howard, Wabash
- List of Indiana state historical markers in Miami County
