= List of Indiana state historical markers in Miami County =

Location of Miami County in Indiana

This is a list of the Indiana state historical markers in Miami County.

This is intended to be a complete list of the official state historical markers placed in Miami County, Indiana, United States by the Indiana Historical Bureau. The locations of the historical markers and their latitude and longitude coordinates are included below when available, along with their names, years of placement, and topics as recorded by the Historical Bureau. There are 3 historical markers located in Miami County.

== Historical markers ==
Marker title	Image	Year placed	Location	Topics
Burial Place of Francis Godfroy		1992	Chief Francis Godfroy Cemetery, along State Road 124 4 miles east of Peru; 40°45′4″N 85°59′35″W	American Indian/Native American, Cemetery
House of Chief Richardville		1992	County Road 300E (Mississinewa Road), 3 miles east of Peru; 40°44′52″N 86°1′13″W	American Indian/Native American, Buildings and Architecture, Government Institutions
Marie Stuart Edwards, 1880-1970		2023	123 W. Main St., Peru	Political, Women

== See also ==
- List of Indiana state historical markers
- National Register of Historic Places listings in Miami County, Indiana
