= Francis Godfroy =

Chief of the Miami people (1788–1840)

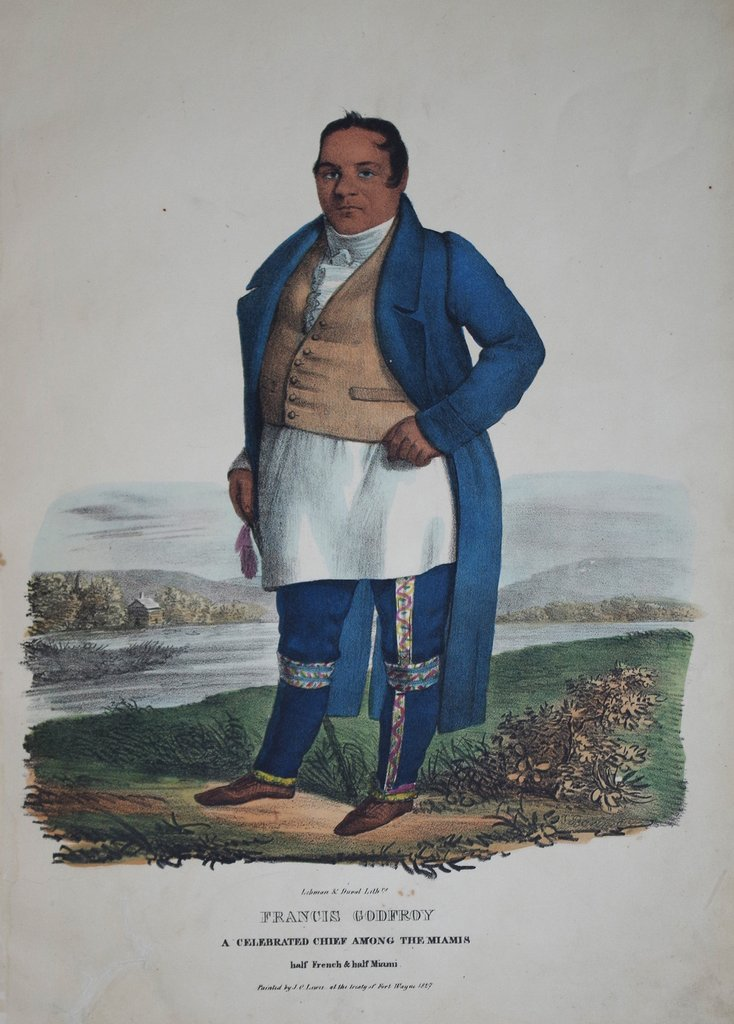
Francis Godfroy, a celebrated Miami chief who was half French and half Miami. Hand-colored lithograph from the Aboriginal Portfolio, painted at the Treaty of Fort Wayne (1827).

Francis Godfroy (Palaanswa, c. 1788–1840) was a chief of the Miami people. He negotiated treaties between his tribe and the United States.

== Background ==
Francis (or François) Godfroy was born at Little Turtle's village (now Ft. Wayne, Indiana) in about 1788, the son of Jacques Godfroy, a French trader, and a Miami woman. His Miami name, Palonswah, was the Miami approximation of the name François. The Miamis were involved in comparatively few frontier grievances in the period leading up to the War of 1812, but their resistance to further land cessions in Indiana Territory after 1809 led to American attacks on their villages along the lower Mississinewa River near today's Peru, Indiana. Francis Godfroy was one of the leaders in a Miami counterattack on an American army led by Lieutenant Colonel John Campbell in the Battle of the Mississinewa on December 17–18, 1812.

== Trading career ==
After the War of 1812, Godfroy turned increasingly to trade, in partnership with the Miamis' principal chief, Jean Baptiste Richardville. In 1823 he had a two-story trading post built at the mouth of the Mississinewa, which was kept well stocked with merchandise. Until 1827 he alternated residences between the post, known as Mount Pleasant, and the Godfroy treaty reserve in today's Blackford County, Indiana. As a mixed-blood trader well aware of the value of land and merchandise, he became influential with Richardville in brokering the sale of tribal land at treaty councils held in 1826, 1834 at the Treaty at the Forks of the Wabash, and 1838. From 1818 to 1838, Godfroy was given a total of seventeen sections of land (10,880 acres) and $17,612 in payment for services as chief and for the debts of tribespeople to his trading post, as well as a house and other gifts.

Though Godfroy was well rewarded for his services as an intermediary between the Miami tribe and American officials, he was no mere pawn of American interests. Along with Richardville, he was able to frustrate the efforts of General John Tipton, Governor Lewis Cass, and various Indian agents to bring about rapid land cessions and Miami removal. In conjunction with traders such as the Ewing brothers, Godfroy and Richardville were able to wrest much larger payments for land ceded by treaty and to postpone the Miamis' removal longer than that of most other midwestern tribes. Godfroy, Richardville, and another Miami chief named Meshingomesia were able to get exemption from removal for their families. These small family groups of Miamis became the core population of today's Indiana Miami tribe.

== War chief ==
In 1830, Francis Godfroy was elected war chief of the Miamis, though the post was largely honorary at that time. He died in May 1840 at his Mount Pleasant trading post and was buried nearby in what is now Peru, Indiana. The Godfroy cemetery continues as a Miami burial ground today. Through his two wives he left a large number of descendants. A large man, he dressed in a mixture of European and native clothing, often wearing a vest and a blue waistcoat over a ruffled shirt, with a breechcloth, leggings, and moccasins. He was pictured by two amateur artists, George Winter and James Otto Lewis.

Godfroy was a key figure in the continuing persistence of the Indiana Miamis as a tribe through his landholdings and the leadership of his descendants. After his death, his treaty grant surrounding Mount Pleasant became a refuge for landless Miamis returning from Kansas after Miami removal in 1846. His youngest son, Gabriel (Wapanakekapwah, "White Blossoms"), became a leader of the Indiana Miamis until his death in 1910. His many children and grandchildren married among all the Miami kinship groups to the extent that over one-fourth of the current Indiana Miami tribe can claim descendency from him. Later descendants have continued in leadership roles in the tribe to this day. Ira Sylvester Godfroy (Mihtohseenia, "Indian"), a great-grandson of Godfroy's, was a chief of the Indiana Miamis from 1938 to 1961, and was a leader in gaining tribal awards in Miami land claims. Another great-grandson, Clarence Godfroy (Keepaahpwa, "Looking over the Top"), was a noted Miami storyteller and one of the last fluent speakers of the Miami language. In 1977, in federal circuit court in South Bend, Indiana, another great-grandson, Oliver Godfroy (Swimming Turtle), won tax exemption on seventy-nine acres of remaining Francis Godfroy treaty ground.

== Death and legacy ==
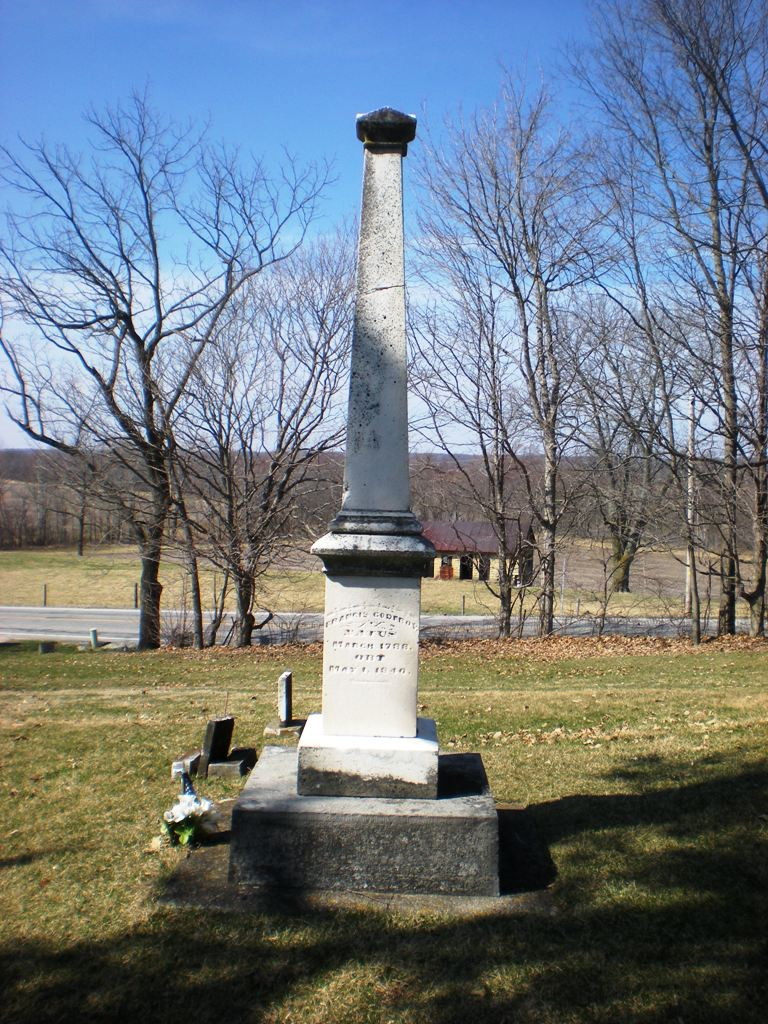
Grave of Chief Francis Godfroy

Francis Godfrey died May 1, 1840. He was described as being over 6 feet tall and weighed about 350 pounds. He had two wives, buried outside of Peru, Indiana in the Francis Godfroy Cemetery, have a photo that was printed in "History of Miami County, Indiana" edited by Mr., Arthur L. Bodurtha Volume I, published by The Lewis Publishing Company Chicago, & New York 1914. The Francis Godfroy Cemetery was listed on the National Register of Historic Places in 1984.

== See also ==
- Tetinchoua
- Pacanne
- Francis La Fontaine
- Frances Slocum
- William Wells (soldier)
