= Marie Stuart Edwards =

American suffragist

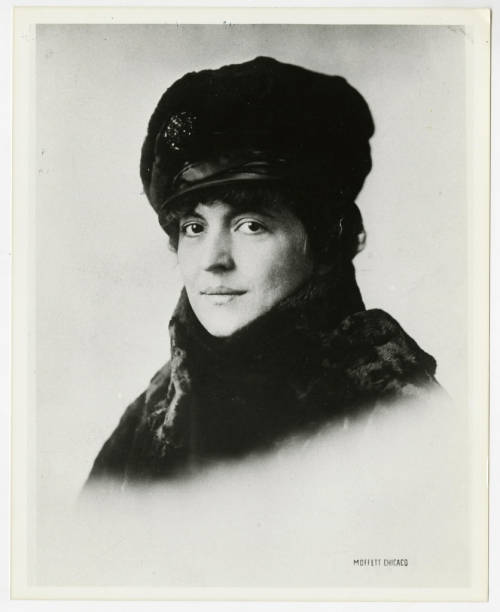
Marie Stuart Edwards, c. 1920

Marie Stuart Edwards was a suffragist and social reformer from Peru, Indiana. She served as president of the Woman's Franchise League of Indiana (1917–1919); publicity director of National American Woman Suffrage Association (NAWSA) during the Nineteenth Amendment's passage in 1920; and vice president of the National League of Women Voters (1921–1923).

== Early life and education ==
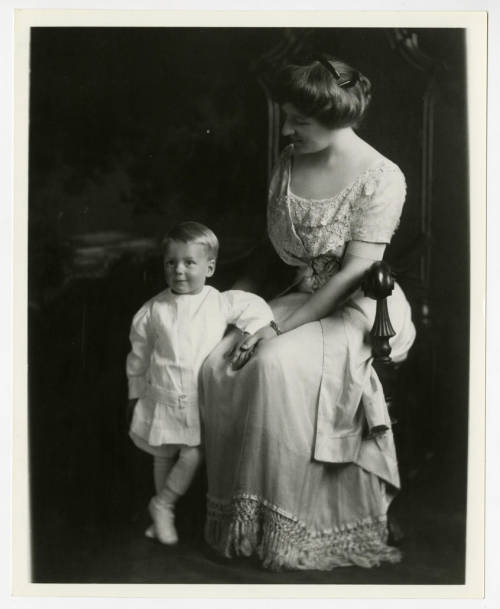
Marie Stuart Edwards and son, Richard, 1912

Edwards was born to Thomas Arthur and Ada (Ellsworth) Stuart in Lafayette, Tippecanoe County, Indiana on September 11, 1880. She had a younger brother, Allison Ellsworth Stuart, who would become a lawyer. She graduated from Smith College in 1901, where she was involved in theatre, societies and clubs, and social activities. Edwards married Richard Elbert Edwards in 1904 and they had one son, Richard Arthur (1909–1984). In 1914, the family moved into the Shirk-Edwards House, a Classical Revival and Victorian dwelling located at 50 North Hood Street, Peru, Miami County, Indiana, which is on the National Register of Historic Places.

== Career ==
=== Suffrage and World War I ===
During the 1910s, Edwards campaigned for women's suffrage in Indiana and nationally. In 1917, she became the president of the Woman's Franchise League of Indiana (WFL), succeeding Dr. Amelia Keller, serving until 1919. The same year Edwards was elected, the Indiana General Assembly passed the Maston-McKinley Partial Suffrage Act, granting Hoosier women the right to vote in municipal, school and special elections. Between 30,000 and 40,000 women registered to vote in Indianapolis alone within a few months. However, on October 26, 1917, the Indiana Supreme Court ruled the law was unconstitutional, denying Hoosier women the right to vote. As amending the Indiana constitution required both chambers of the Indiana General Assembly to pass a joint resolution in two different years before Indiana voters—all men—could cast a ballot for its ratification, Indiana women's greatest hope for suffrage lay with a national amendment.

The United States entering World War I on April 2, 1917, led most suffragists, with the National American Woman Suffrage Association (NAWSA) at the helm, to pivot to the war effort. Suffragists hoped demonstrating their patriotism and civic duty would lead to a federal amendment. The WFL followed suit with Edwards and Helen Boyd serving on the committee of the Indiana League for Woman's Service, which recruited women to make 2 million shirts for the army and registered 50,000 women for war work by October 1, 1917. However, suffrage work did not cease during the war and Edwards still had hope for women's suffrage in Indiana. At a WFL meeting in 1918, Edwards entreated members to resume lobbying for the passage of a constitutional amendment, as the "withdrawal of voting privilege has enormously increased the number of women interested in suffrage" and "we can never again be the negligible quantity we were before." Under her guidance, the organization undertook an extensive membership drive and a petition for the federal amendment, training speakers and canvassers, which had 283 branch leagues across the state by October 1918. These efforts led to a new partial suffrage law, with a new constitutional amendment passing the first hurdle in the General Assembly in early 1919. Meanwhile, the Susan B. Anthony Amendment had finally passed the U.S. Congress and was sent to the states for ratification. When Indiana became the 26th state to ratify the Nineteenth Amendment on January 16, 1920, Edwards was sitting in each chamber of the General Assembly while each body voted.

After the war, Edwards resigned as president of the Woman's Franchise League to resume suffrage work in Washington, D.C. She was the publicity director of NAWSA when the Nineteenth Amendment granting women the right to vote finally passed on August 18, 1920. Two months after the amendment's passage, she attended Social Justice Day, which she helped organize, in Marion, Ohio on October 1, 1920. There, more than 12,000 women from 40 states listened to the next president, Senator Warren G. Harding, give a front porch campaign speech. Edwards was a founder of the National League of Women Voters, and served as its first treasurer in 1920 and later, as the organization's vice president. As part of her duties as treasurer and manager of the national speakers bureau for the League, she traveled across the United States for speaking engagements.

=== Reform and civic involvement ===
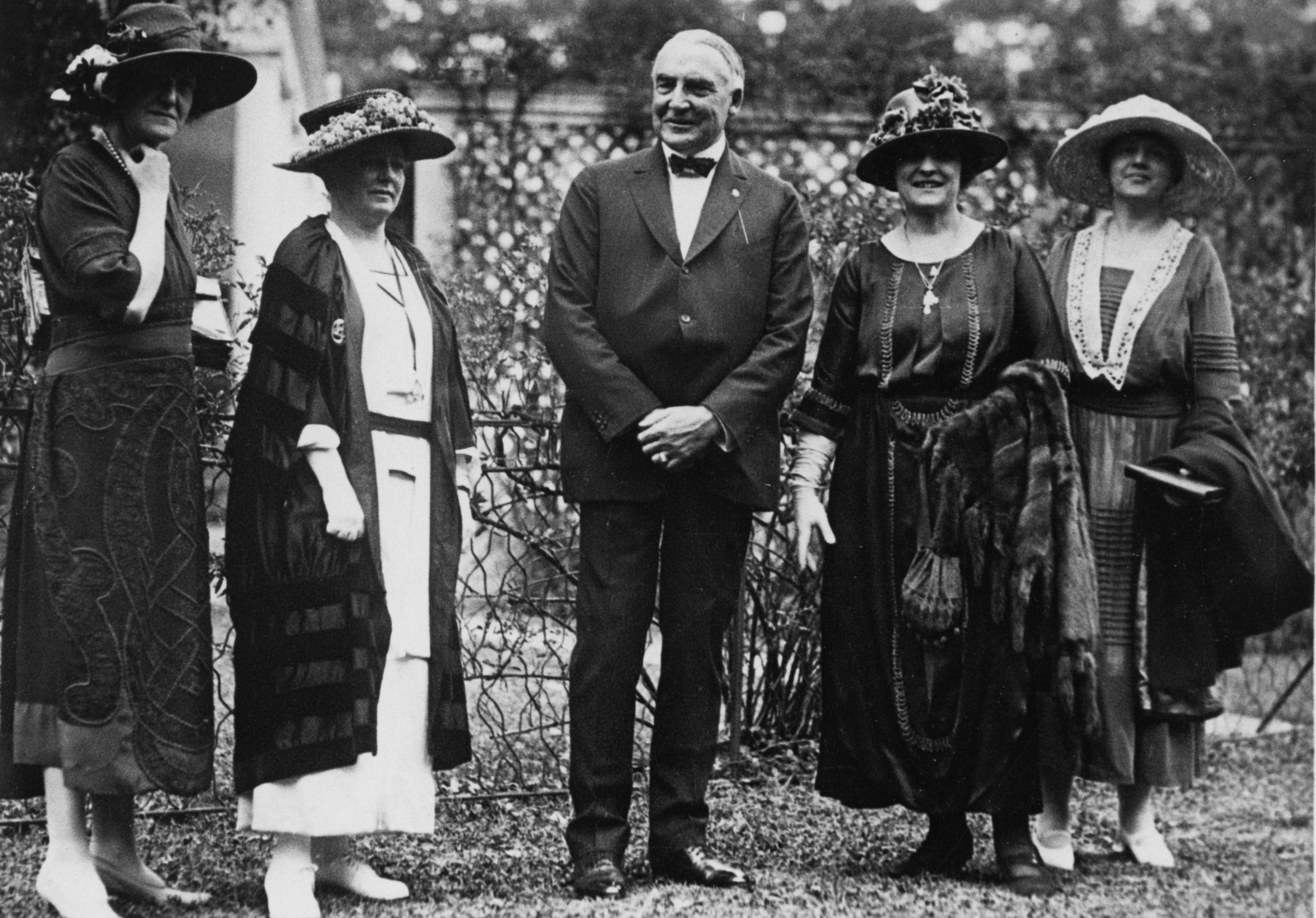
Carrie Chapman Catt (second from left) and Marie Stuart Edwards (fourth from left) with Warren G. Harding at Social Justice Day, Marion, Ohio, October 1, 1920

Besides suffrage, Edwards involved herself in other personal and civic pursuits, which included designing a window screen that was manufactured by her husband's chair factory in Peru, Indiana and managing said factory in his absence during World War I. She was the first woman to sit on the Peru Board of Education and in 1921, she was appointed to the Indiana State Board of Education by Governor Warren T. McCray. In the latter position of authority, she served as a member of the Indiana Committee on Mental Defectives, a state-sponsored eugenics organization pushing a "better babies" agenda and conducting studies of families in more than 20 counties. Edwards led the local Works Progress Administration board in Miami County during the Great Depression, while also serving as chairman of the 10th Anniversary and Memorial Fund of the League. ??? In 1937, she served as vice-president of the Indiana Board of Public Welfare, as well as chairman of the drafting committee for the Indiana Civil Service bill.

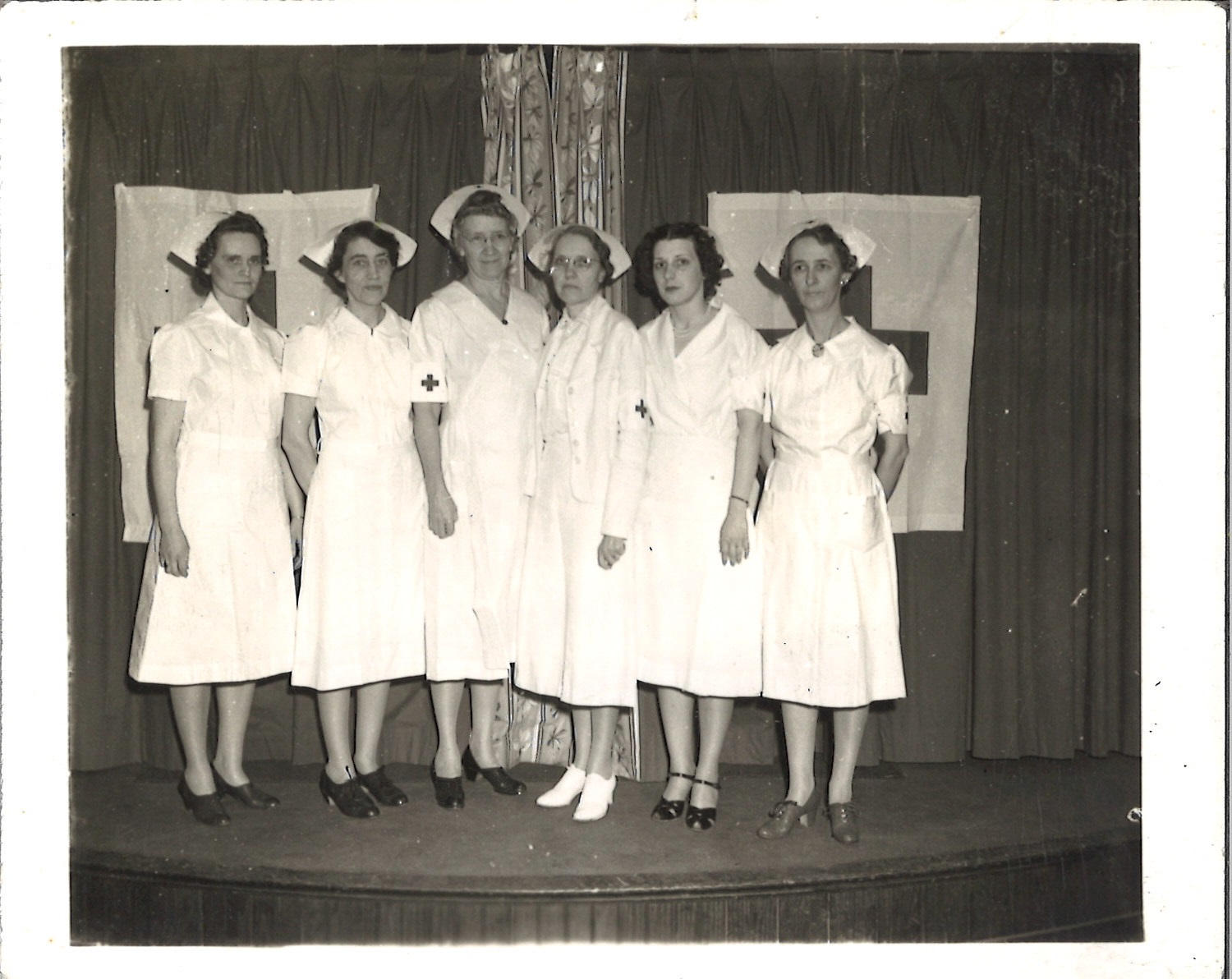
Marie Stuart Edwards and Nurses' Aid Service, Dukes Memorial Hospital, Peru, Indiana, 1941

"Marie made a 1930 nationwide tour on behalf of the League to increase fund raising; this committee reached the goal of $250,000 despite the onset of the Depression. She was chairman of the Department of Government of the Indiana League of Women Voters in 1934. In 1937, she was vice president of the newly created Indiana Board of Public Welfare and chairman of the drafting committee for the Civil Service Bill in Indiana. She was also very involved in trying to improve the state's penal system, serving on the state Board of Corrections and writing the laws for this board." (from Regine blog post – find better sources)

== Death and legacy ==
Edwards died at her family home in Peru, Indiana on November 17, 1970, and was buried in Mount Hope Cemetery in Peru.

Marie Stuart Edwards was honored with a bronze statue in front of the Peru Public Library, where she trained and organized fellow suffragists in her hometown. Dedicated on August 26, 2021, the statue depicts Edwards as a young woman standing by her bicycle as she was recorded as the first woman to ride a bicycle in her birthplace of Lafayette.
