= Francis Godfroy Cemetery =

Cemetery in Miami County, Indiana, US

- U.S. National Register of Historic Places
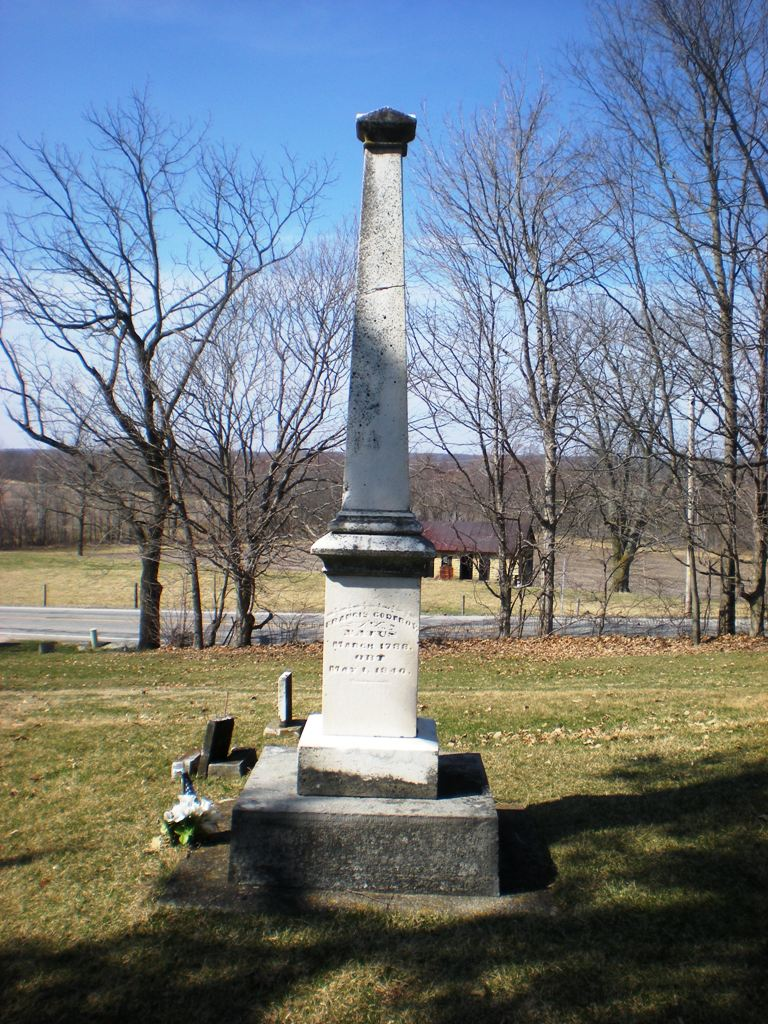
- Miami Chief Francis Godfroy's grave, March 2010

- Location within Indiana Location within the United States
- Location: State Road 124, east of Peru in Butler Township, Miami County, Indiana
- Coordinates: 40°45′3″N 85°59′35″W
- Area: 0.8 acres (0.32 ha)
- Built: 1812
- NRHP reference No.: 84001203
- Added to NRHP: March 1, 1984

Francis Godfroy Cemetery is a historic cemetery located in Butler Township, Miami County, Indiana. The cemetery was established in 1812 on the site of a Miami Nation village and Chief Francis Godfroys council chambers.

It was listed on the National Register of Historic Places in 1984.

== See also ==
- National Register of Historic Places listings in Miami County, Indiana
- List of archaeological sites on the National Register of Historic Places in Indiana
- List of cemeteries in Indiana
- Miami people
