= Harriet Noble =

American academic and suffragist (1851–1919)

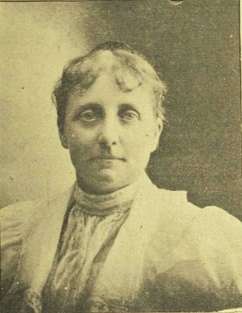
- Image of Noble published in The Indiana Woman, January 1898
- Born: July 12, 1851; Centerville, Wayne County, Indiana, United States
- Died: March 30, 1919 (aged 67); Indianapolis, Indiana, United States
- Education: Vassar College
- Occupations: Educator and suffragist
- Employer: Butler University
- Organization(s): Indiana Women's School League; Equal Suffrage Association; Women's Franchise League of Indiana

Harriet Noble (July 12, 1851 – March 30, 1919) was an American academic and suffragist. She taught at Butler University and campaigned with organisations including the Indiana Women's School League, Equal Suffrage Association and Women's Franchise League of Indiana.

== Biography ==
Noble was born on July 12, 1851, in Centerville, Wayne County, Indiana. Her parents were lawyer Lazarus Noble and Catherine Noble (née Judah) and she was the eldest of their three children.

Noble was educated at the all-girls school Vassar College in Poughkeepsie, New York, graduating with a teaching degree in 1873. In 1912, she was described as "the Indiana grandmother of the Vassar Alumnae."

From 1883 to 1893, Noble worked as a Professor of English at Butler University in Indianapolis. Noble was known by her students for wearing reform dress and was a member of the National Rationalist Association.

In 1909, Noble became treasurer of the Indiana Women's School League, which succeeded in its aim "to elect a woman to the school board ... of Indianapolis." She was also a member of the Indianapolis Women's Club.

In 1911, after a resolution was made at the Indiana State Legislature to amend the state constitution by striking out the word "male," Noble was among representatives of the Equal Suffrage Association who spoke at the Municipal League's annual meeting at Crawfordsville on the resolution.

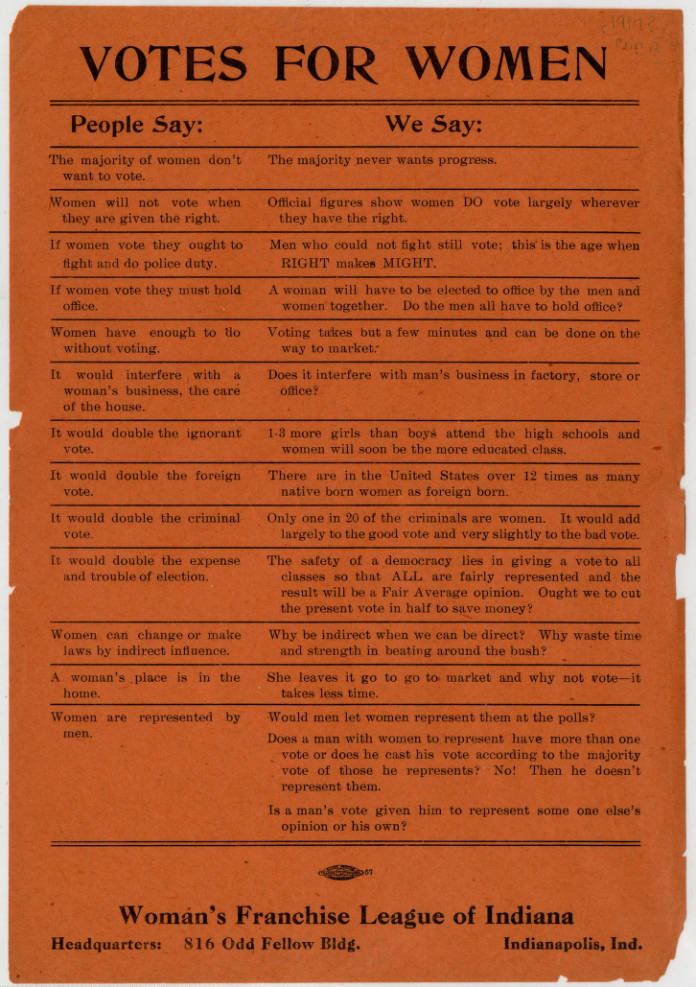
Broadside created and circulated by Women's Franchise league of Indiana addressing then common reservations about granting women the right to vote

From 1911 to 1915, Noble served as field secretary for the Women's Franchise League of Indiana. She was a member of the Indianapolis Local Council of Women and was acting president during the two-month illness of president Mrs. Nichols, on Nichols' request.

Noble died on March 30, 1919, in Indianapolis, aged 67.

Nine years after her death, the Harriet Noble Friendship Circle social club commissioned Constance Forsytah to paint a portrait of Noble to be hung in Butler University's English Department.
