= Godfroy Reserve =

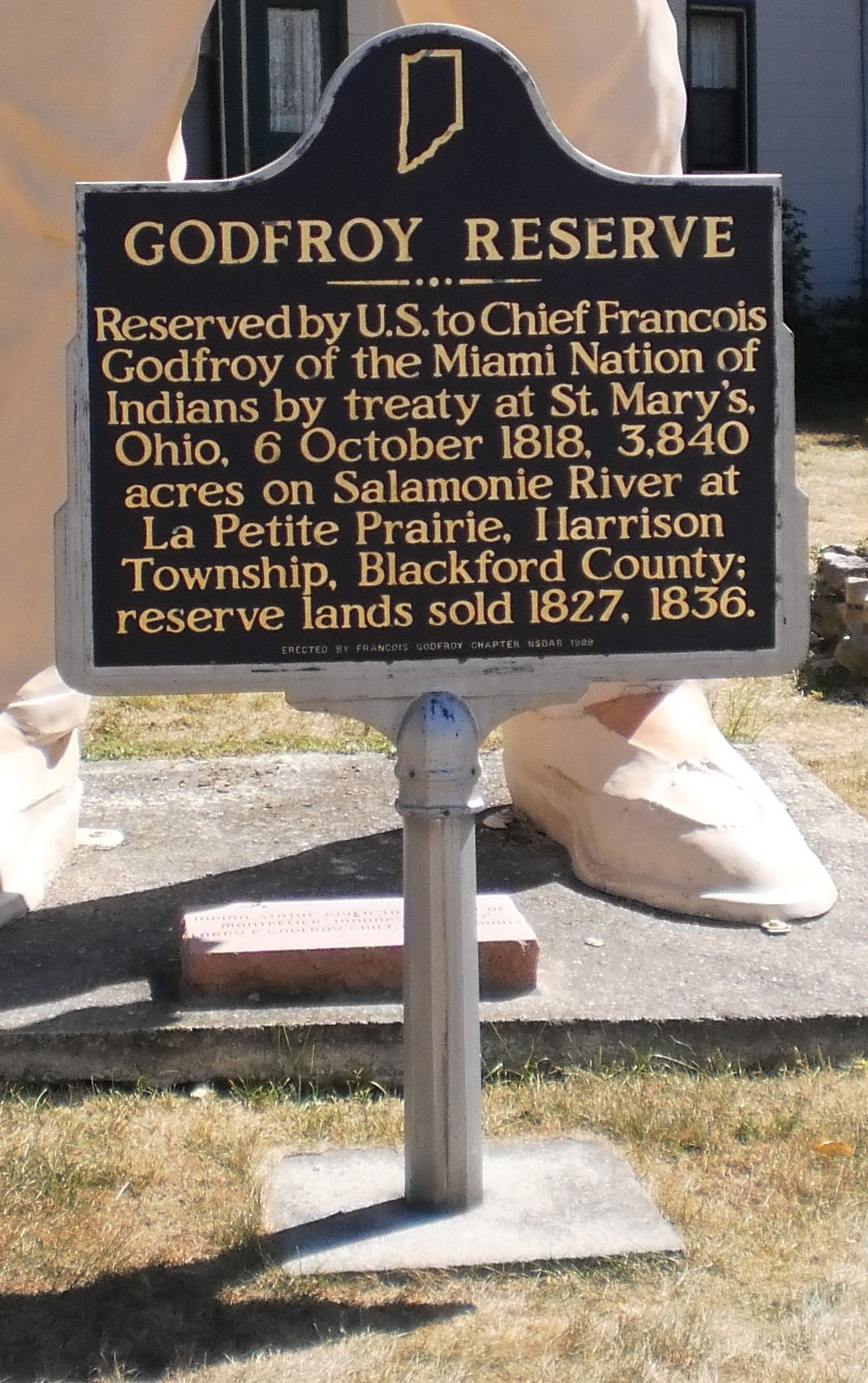
Godfroy Reserve Marker in Montpelier Indiana

The Godfroy Reserve was a tract of land allotted to Chief Francois Godfroy (Palaanswa), chief of an American native tribe, the Miami Nation, by United States government Indian treaty. The reserve is located along the Salamonie River in Blackford County, Indiana. The Miami Tribe was forced to move west to Kansas Territory (and later to Indian Territory), but several tribal leaders, all of mixed French Canadian and Native American heritage, were allotted land in Indiana. This exception was due to their history of cooperation with the US and their willingness to participate in government attempts to "civilize" them.

The reserve land was occupied as a Half-breed tract between about 1814 and 1834, after which Chief Godfroy left because white neighbors repeatedly encroached upon the land, and because of the conditions of the Treaty of 1834 between Indiana and the Miamis who remained.

The text of the marker reads:

Reserved by U.S. to Chief Francois Godfroy of the Miami Nation of Indians by treaty at St. Mary's, Ohio, 6 October 1818, 3, 840 acres on Salamonie River at La Petite Prairie, Harrison Township, Blackford County; reserve lands sold 1827, 1836.

The history of the Reserve and of Chief Godfroy is detailed in History of Jay County, Indiana: including its World War record.

Unsuccessful efforts were made in the 1960s to turn the reserve into a state park. Efforts were again made in the 2000s, but since it was the habitat of two plants, the frog orchid and the small purple-fringed orchid, on the Endangered Species List, the plans failed. The site once contained many Native American artifacts.
