= Woman's Franchise League of Indiana =

Suffrage group, established 1911

The Woman's Franchise League of Indiana
- Formation: 1911
- Headquarters: Peru, Indiana

The Woman's Franchise League of Indiana was a suffrage group organized in 1911, as a merger of the Indianapolis Franchise Society and Legislative Council of Indiana Women. The organization was associated with the National American Woman Suffrage Association (NASWA) and was the prominent suffrage group of Indiana. The Woman's Franchise League of Indiana would expand to one thousand, two hundred and five memberships in thirteen districts.

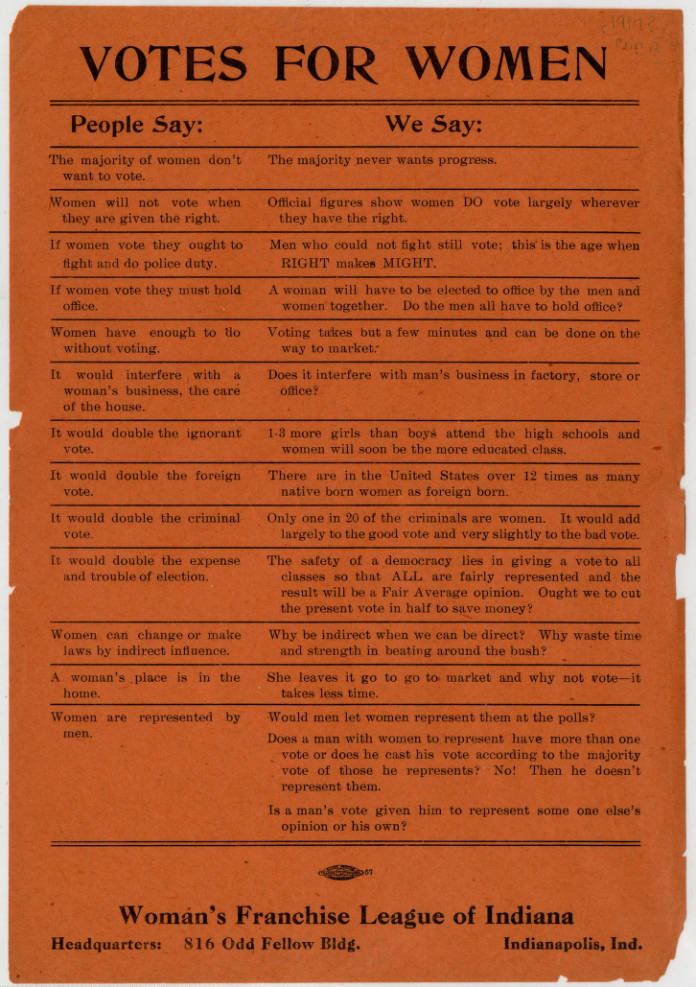
Woman's Franchise League of Indiana Broadside suffragist broadside, c. 1910s

== Early Origin and The Maston-McKinley Partial Suffrage Act ==
The Woman's Franchise League of Indiana officially organized in 1911. The first convention for the WFL was held in 1912 underneath the motto, "Dignified Conduct at All Times". During the convention, the WFL created policies in order to create an effective organization that spread throughout Indiana, and gave a series of instructions for lower level memberships to create their own leagues. The primary goal of the WFL was to organize Hoosier women and allies in order to give the women voting rights at the state level. After the failure of the Maston-McKinley Partial Suffrage Bill, Hoosier suffragists and allies focused on a federal amendment to grant them the right to vote.

=== Maston-McKinley Partial Suffrage Bill ===
Prior to World War One, the WFL focused on obtaining the vote at the state level. Their initial efforts did lead to results when the state passed the Maston-McKinley Partial Suffrage Bill in 1917 which granted women the right to vote in municipal, school and certain special elections. At the passing of this bill many women registered to vote, including between thirty and forty thousand women in Indianapolis. The Maston-McKinley Partial Suffrage Act placed Indiana in line with states such as Illinois, Utah and Michigan. Unfortunately for the pro-suffrage movement in Indiana, the Maston-Mckinley Partial Suffrage Act was short lived.

=== Repeal of the Maston-McKinley Partial Suffrage Act ===
The Maston-McKinley Partial Suffrage Act faced extreme opposition in the state of Indiana after two men filed lawsuits against the constitutionality of the Maston-McKinley Partial Suffrage Act. Henry W. Bennett filed a lawsuit in 1917 against the constitutional convention law claiming that the expense of holding a convention was too great. Although the Indiana Supreme Court did not rule the Maston-Mckenly Partial Suffrage Act unconstitutional, a lawsuit would soon be filed by another Hoosier man, William Knight.

William Knight, a prominent businessman, filed a lawsuit shortly after the conclusion of the Bennet lawsuit. Knight argued in his lawsuit that taxpayers should not have to pay for the increased costs incurred by the additional votes of women to then be processed, nor for the expense for the separate polling stations for women, as required by the suffrage act. The Indiana Supreme Court would side with Knight in the lawsuit of Board of Election Commissioners of the City of Indianapolis v. Knight. Knight would also go on to win on appeal.

Marie Stuart Edwards, a Hoosier woman, influenced her brother Allison Stuart to appeal the Indiana Supreme Court to grant presidential suffrage for women but this appeal was eventually dismissed in February 1918.

The decision of the Indiana Supreme Court would effectively end the rights for women to vote in Indiana. This would be a turning point for the Woman's Franchise League of Indiana, as they refocused their combined efforts to a Federal Amendment as the Nineteenth Amendment of the United States.

== WFL During the World War I Era ==
Following the disappointment of the Maston-McKinley Partial Suffrage Act, the WFL of Indiana refocused their efforts to join forces with the National American Woman Suffrage Association in seeking a federal amendment granting suffrage for women. The WFL of Indiana would undergo a movement utilizing pamphlets, organizing women and performing marches in the United States. The WFL would also argue the social and working conditions created by World War I enabled women to voice their opinions to a different audience. In a pamphlet named "Votes For Women! The Woman's Reason" some of the reasons listed for women to vote were, "Women must obey the laws just as men do, they should vote equally with men", "Women are consumers, and consumers need fuller representation in politics", and "Women are citizens of the government OF the people, BY the people and FOR the people, AND WOMEN ARE PEOPLE". This new direction, taken during the era of World War I, led to newfound success and membership growth.

With this renewed motivation, the WFL would strive to earn the vote and eventually succeeded. Women's votes were recognized in September, 1921 via a special state election. The WFL would eventually reorganize into the League of Women Voters in 1921 after Hosier women finally earned the right to vote.

== Organization ==
The Woman's Franchise League of Indiana was headquartered in Peru, Indiana. The WFL consisted of a president, treasurer, and an executive secretary. The league went from thirty six branches in 1912, sixty branches in 1916 and one hundred twelve in 1921 when it reorganized into the League of Women Voters in 1921

=== Committees ===
The WFL held a firm commitment to ensuring that all women in memberships held a substantial committee role. This allowed maximum participation and presidents of memberships were encouraged to appointment women to committees instead of letting women volunteer to head a committee. Committees ranged from Organization Committee, Transportation Committee, Memberships Committee, Finance Committee, Publicity Committee, Telephone Committee, Endorsement Committee, Literature Committee, Speakers Bureau Committee and the Entertainment Committee.

=== Demographics ===
While it is difficult to comment on the socioeconomic diversity of the WFL, it is presumed that most of the individuals were white women of middle to upper class statuses. There is some evidence of participation from black women, but it is impossible to tell if they were given the same privilege of their white counterparts.

=== Districts ===
The chart below provides the number of districts and members there were in 1919.

District	Counties	Number of Members
1	Gibson, Vanderburg, Warrick, Posey	31
2	Davies, Greene, Knox, Martin, Monroe, Owen, Sullivan, Morgan	103
3	Clark, Crawford, Dubois, Perry, Scott, Washington	101
4	Brown, Bartholomew, Dearborn, Johnson, Ohio, Ripley	57
5	Clay, Hendricks, Parke, Putnam, Vermillion, Vigo	136
6	Fayette, Wayne, Franklin, Hancock, Henry, Rush, Shelby, Union, Wayne	110
7	Marion	19
8	Adams, Delaware, Jay, Madison, Wells	104
9	Boone, Carroll, Clinton, Fountain, Hamilton, Howard, Tipton, Montgomery	92
10	Benton, Lake, Newton, Porter, Tippecanoe, Warren, White	117
11	Blackford, Cass, Grant, Huntington, Miami, Pulaski, Wabash	156
12	Allen, Dekalb, Noble, Steuben, Whitley	80
13	Elkhart, Fulton, Laporte, Marshall, St. Joseph, Kosciusko	99
