= John Ross Woodring =

American newspaper editor

John Ross Woodring (J. Ross Woodring) (1883–1946), a newspaperman, was born in Macy, Indiana, on December 23, 1883. He received his B.S. from DePauw University and taught school for two years upon graduation. He began his newspaper career with his father, Wilford Ash Woodring (d. December 9, 1913), in Peru, Indiana, in 1909. Ross became owner and editor of the Peru Evening Journal and the Peru Morning Journal upon the death of his father in 1913.

Woodring was also a showman, and was part owner of the Alderfer Circus, which summered in Peru and wintered in Denver.

Woodring moved to Canada, eventually settling in Edmonton, Alberta, where he worked as the managing editor of the Edmonton Bulletin newspaper. He also farmed west of Edmonton in the Hattonford area, where he produced a number of local shows for the community. Woodring married Grace Juanita Rockwood (1913–2009), and had one daughter, Elizabeth Joan (1934-2012).

Woodring is buried in the Edmonton Municipal Cemetery.
