= James Omar Cole House =

American historic home in Peru, Indiana

- U.S. National Register of Historic Places
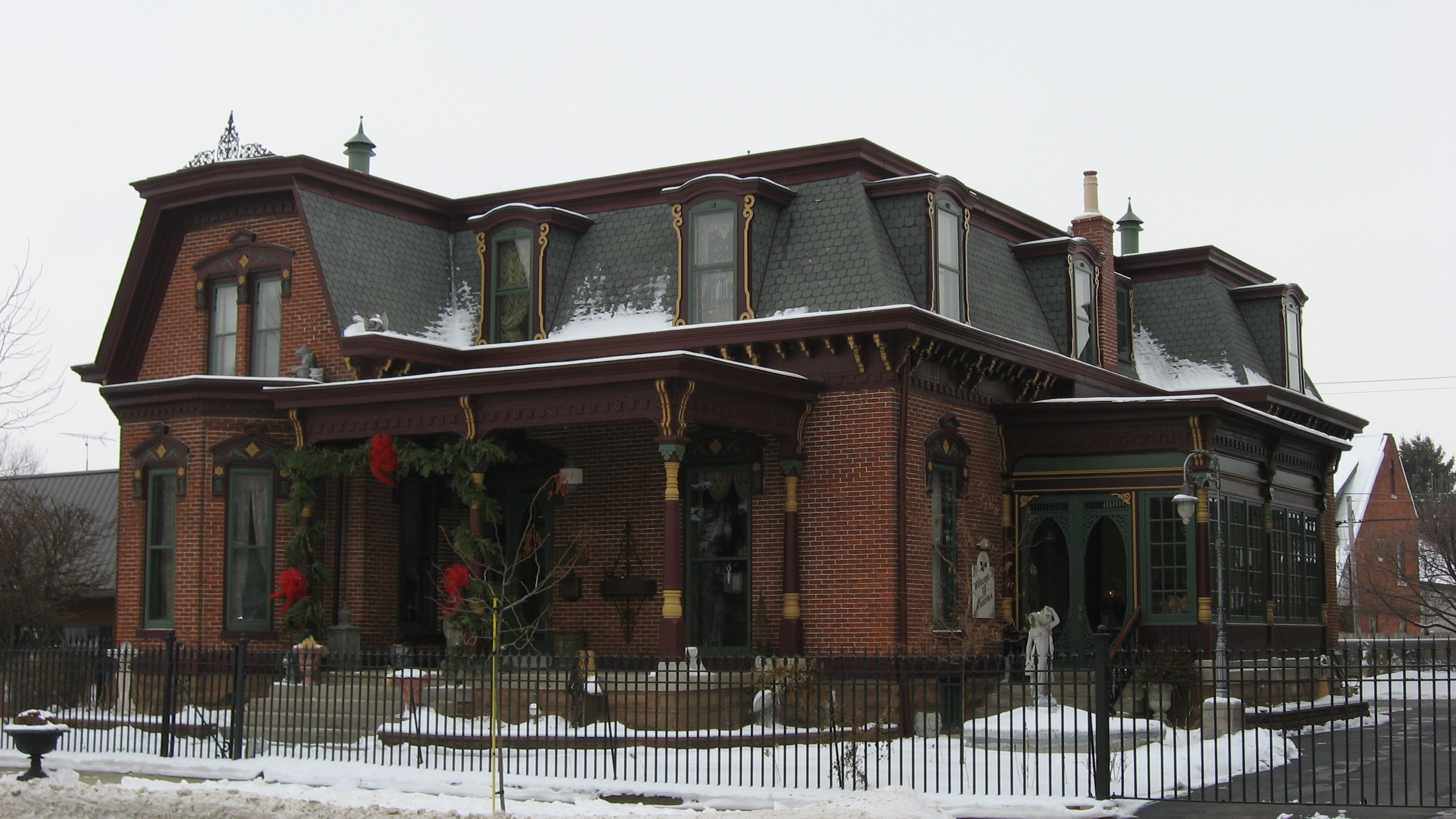
- James Omar Cole House, January 2011

- Location within Indiana Location within the United States
- Location: 27 E. 3rd St., Peru, Indiana
- Coordinates: 40°45′12″N 86°4′0″W
- Area: less than one acre
- Built: c. 1883
- Architectural style: Second Empire
- NRHP reference No.: 84001198
- Added to NRHP: March 1, 1984

James Omar Cole House, also known as the Cole House, is a historic home located at Peru, Indiana, United States. It was built about 1883, as a 1 1/2-story, Second Empire style brick dwelling. It has a square plan with two projecting bays and a mansard roof with dormers.

It was listed on the National Register of Historic Places in 1984.
