= Miami County Courthouse (Indiana) =

- U.S. National Register of Historic Places
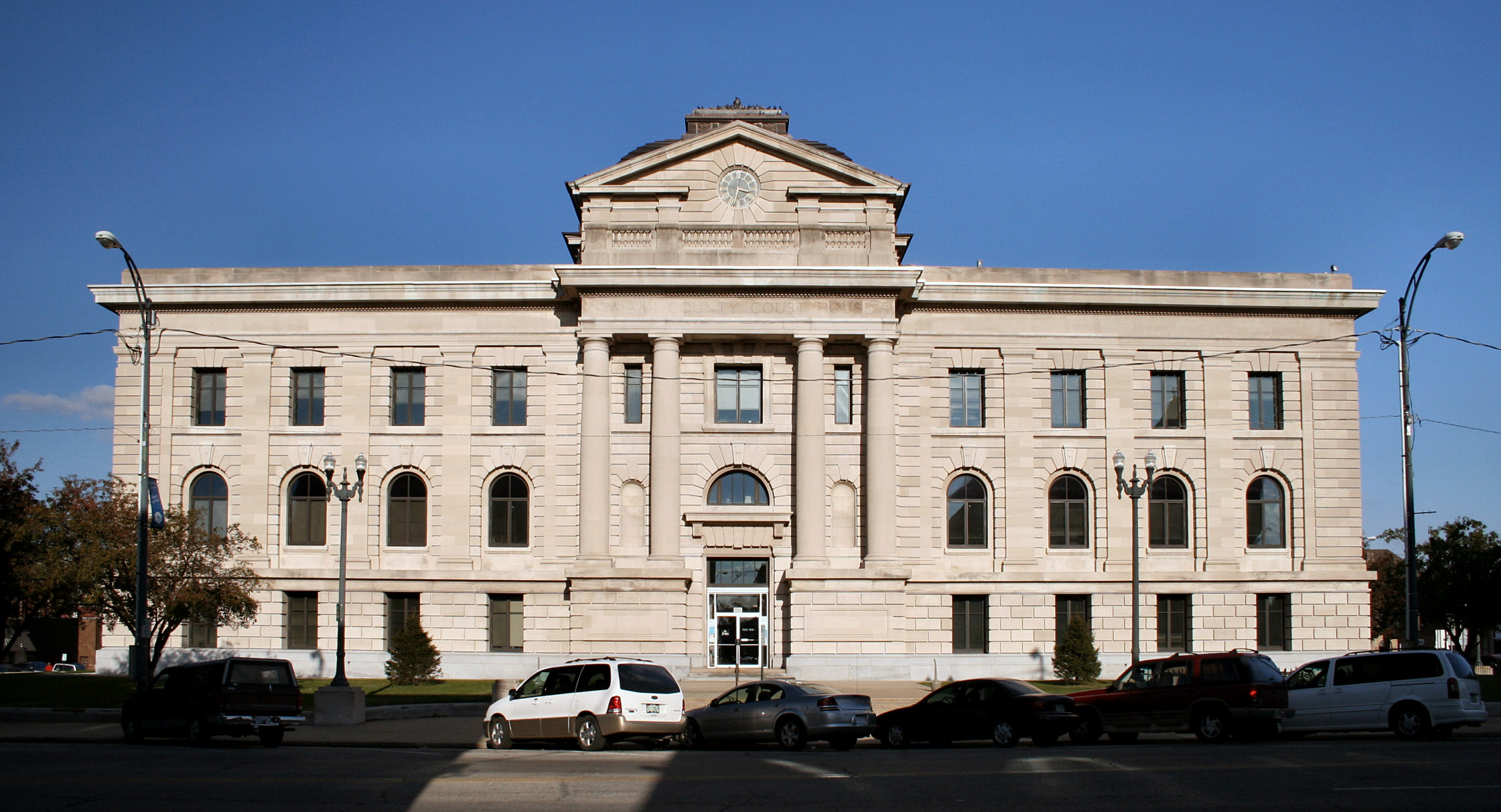
- Miami County Courthouse, October 2005

- Location within Indiana Location within the United States
- Interactive map showing the location of Miami County Courthouse
- Location: Public Square, Peru, Indiana
- Coordinates: 40°45′16″N 86°4′8″W
- Area: 1.3 acres (0.53 ha)
- Built: 1908-1910
- Architect: Lehman & Schmitt; McCormack, P.H.
- Architectural style: Classical Revival
- NRHP reference No.: 08000194
- Added to NRHP: March 19, 2008

Miami County Courthouse is a historic courthouse located at Peru, Indiana. It was built between 1908 and 1910, and is a three-story, steel frame, concrete-and-brick building sheathed in a veneer of Bedford limestone. It features a projecting portico with freestanding two-story Tuscan order columns in the Classical Revival. The building has a flat roof topped by a squat four-sided square dome. The property includes an additional 33 contributing objects, such as a bell with stand, "Lady Liberty" statue (commonly known by many as "Statue of liberty"), retaining wall, 12 architectural lamps, and 6 street lamps.

It was listed on the National Register of Historic Places in 2008.
