= Peru High School Historic District =

Historic district in Indiana, United States

- U.S. National Register of Historic Places
- U.S. Historic district
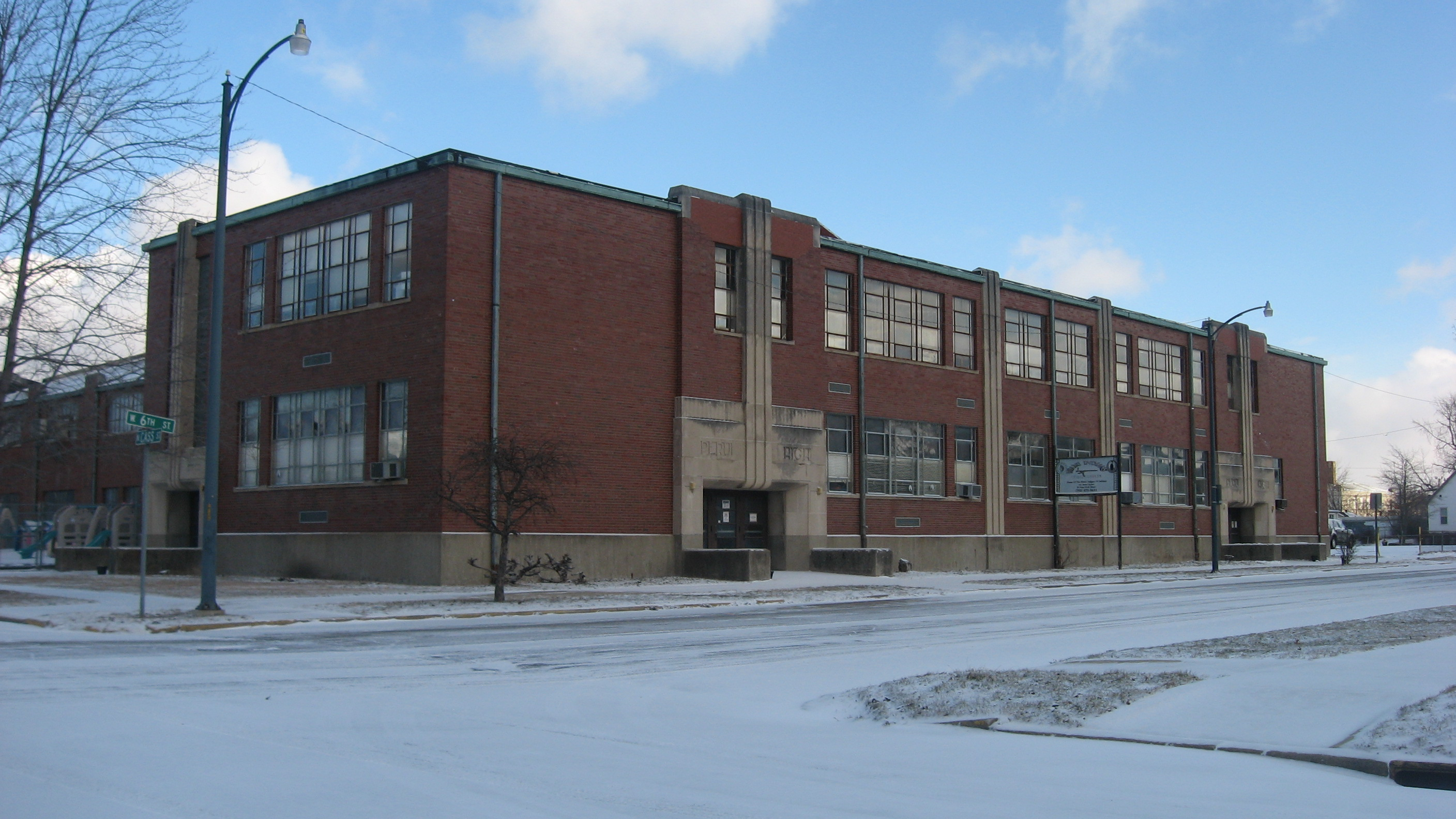
- Old Peru High School, January 2013

- Location within Indiana Location within the United States
- Location: 80 W. 6th St., Peru, Indiana
- Coordinates: 40°45′16″N 86°4′24″W
- Area: Less than 1 acre (0.40 ha)
- Built: c. 1922, c. 1926, c. 1939
- Architect: Wolf, Henry C.; Cook, Oscar F.
- Architectural style: Art Deco, Collegiate Gothic, Classical Revival
- NRHP reference No.: 12001154
- Added to NRHP: January 9, 2013

Peru High School Historic District is a historic school complex and national historic district located at Peru, Indiana. It encompasses the Classical Revival style Central Grade School (c. 1922), Collegiate Gothic style Industrial Arts Building (c. 1926), and Art Deco style former high school (c. 1939). The high school was built as a Works Progress Administration project along with the Tig-Arena and is a two-story masonry building. The school yard is considered a contributing site. The high school remained in use as a high school until the new Peru High School was built in 1969–1971. Since 1990, the buildings have served as headquarters for the Miami Nation of Indiana.

It was listed on the National Register of Historic Places in 2013.
