= Brownell Block/Senger Dry Goods Company Building =

- U.S. National Register of Historic Places
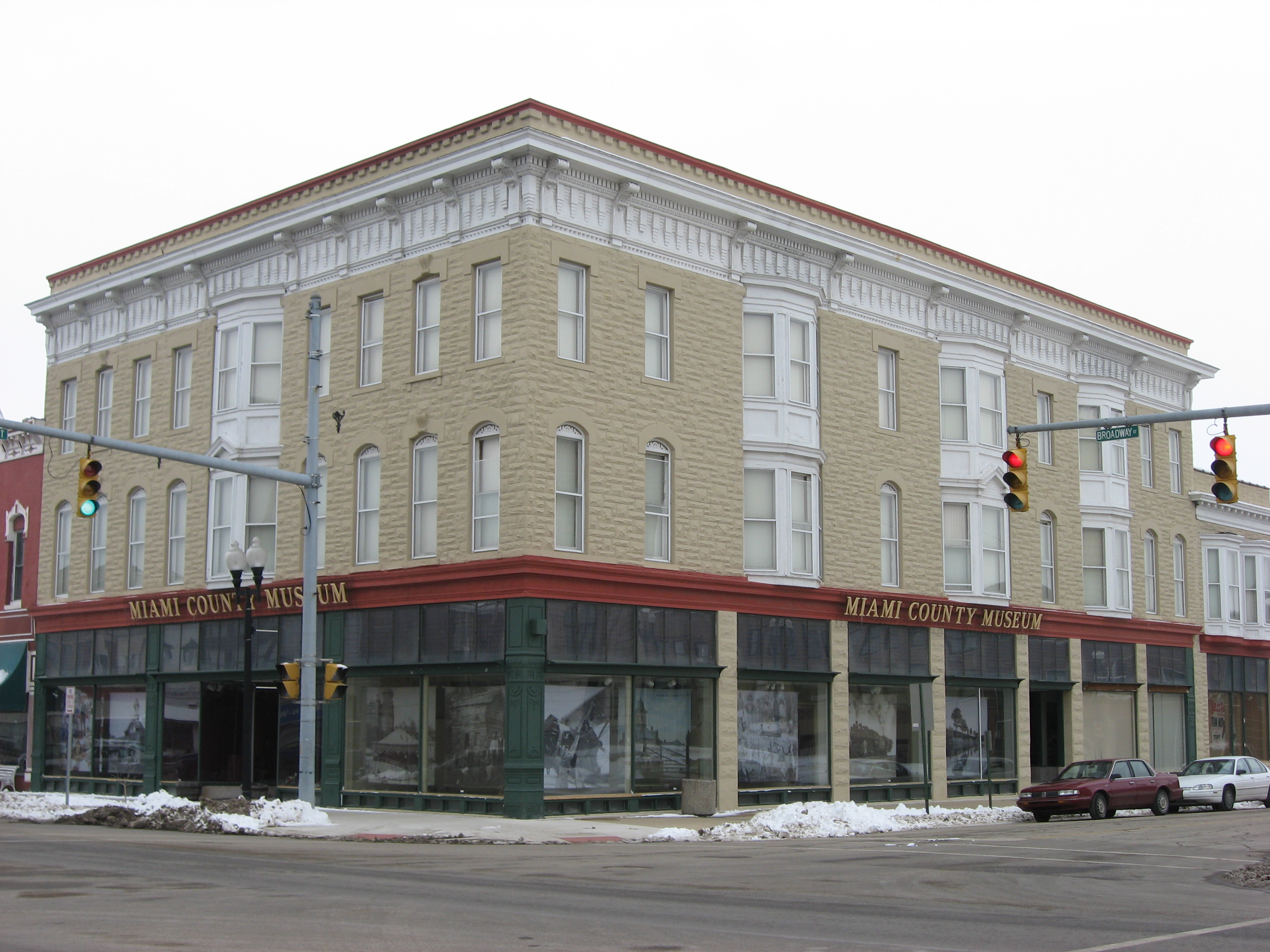
- Brownell Block-Senger Dry Goods Company Building, January 2011

- Location within Indiana Location within the United States
- Location: Broadway and 5th Sts., Peru, Indiana
- Coordinates: 40°45′18″N 86°4′10″W
- Area: less than one acre
- Built: 1883-1884
- Architect: Goodall, J. B.
- Architectural style: Italianate
- NRHP reference No.: 83000007
- Added to NRHP: September 1, 1983

Brownell Block, also known as the Senger Dry Goods Company Building, is a historic commercial building located at Peru, Indiana. It was built in 1883–1884, as a three-story, Italianate style brick building faced with a molded stone veneer. The rectangular building measures 66 feet, 6 inches, by 132 feet. It has a two-story addition and features projecting bays on the second and third floors. The building was home to Senger Dry Goods Company for 70 years. It houses the Miami County Museum.

It was listed on the National Register of Historic Places in 1983.
