= Tetinchoua =

Miami chief (17th century)

Tetinchoua was chief of the Miami people in the 17th century. Nicolas Perrot, a French traveler, met him in Chicago in 1671. He said Tetinchoua was "the most powerful of Indian chiefs". Perrot stated that Tetinchoua could easily manage approximately five thousand warriors as evidence of his authority and power. He never lacked guarded protection of at least forty men who were even posted around Tetinchoua's tent while he slept. He interacted little with his followers, using subordinates to relay his orders. He was highly regarded as a warrior, and the priest Claude Dablon said he was attractive with soft features and mannerisms.

== Origin of chieftainship ==
Tetinchoua was born a Miami Indian and related to an already powerful chief. In his band of Indians, chiefs inherited power. This differs from many Algonquian traditions in the north where leadership and power come from acts and accomplishments. Tetinchoua was also characterized as an autocratic ruler who had absolute power.

== Geography of Miami Indians ==
The Miami Indians inhabited Wisconsin before migrating into northeastern Indiana, northwestern Ohio, and southern Michigan. When Europeans came into contact with the natives, they were living in western Lake Michigan. Oral tradition implies that the Miami Indians migrated to these regions in order to avoid the Iroquois War parties in Ohio. In 1658, they were settled northeast of Lake Winnebago, Wisconsin. In 1667 they were primarily in the Mississippi Valley of Wisconsin. By 1670, they were at the mouth of the Fox River in Wisconsin. In 1673 they had made their way to St. Joseph River Village and some in Kalamazoo River Village in Michigan. From 1720 to 1763 they had migrated out of Michigan and into Ohio at Miami River locations as well as near Columbus in Scioto River village. In 1831 they reached Oklahoma on Indian Territory.

== Impact on Indian and French life ==
In 1671, Nicolas Perrot was adorned with great honor from the French governor, Charles de Montmagny, since he acted as a messenger between the groups involved in this contact. He was also met with favorable greetings from Tetinchoua who received him military style. The detachment sent adorned with feathers and weaponry. Peace between the Potawatomi and the Miamis was made when both groups were face to face and the Miami fired their guns that were only loaded with powder. The Potawatomi then responded in the same manner. Onontio was the name given to the governor by the Algonquian tribe since it translates to "high and majestic mountain". Every governor after Montmagny is referred to as Onontio. It is a title that gives the governor the role of a father to the Algonquian tribes. Tetinchoua was too ill and unable to join Perrot on the mission to Sault Ste. Marie which is why he had given the Potawatomi the power to act in his name. The escapade, according to the Potawatomi, would have been detrimental to his health. Tetinchoua sent his men to escort Perrot into one of the most important towns in the Miamis. He then assigned Perrot fifty men whom had the duty to guard him. In efforts to redirect Perrot's mind, he set up a "game of ball" to be played. The French had claimed possession of all land on the lakes where the river enters the lake of Lake Superior and the Potawatomi along with Perrot and missionaries were to meet these men at the mouth of Lake Superior in efforts to expand. Upon arrival, the indigenous created an alliance with these French men. In 1672 Father Claude Dablon, a missionary, made attempts at conversions. He met Tetinchoua with approximately three-thousand Miamis and was greeted amicably, yet was unsuccessful in his efforts of conversion.
