= Shirk-Edwards House =

Historic house in Indiana, United States

- U.S. National Register of Historic Places
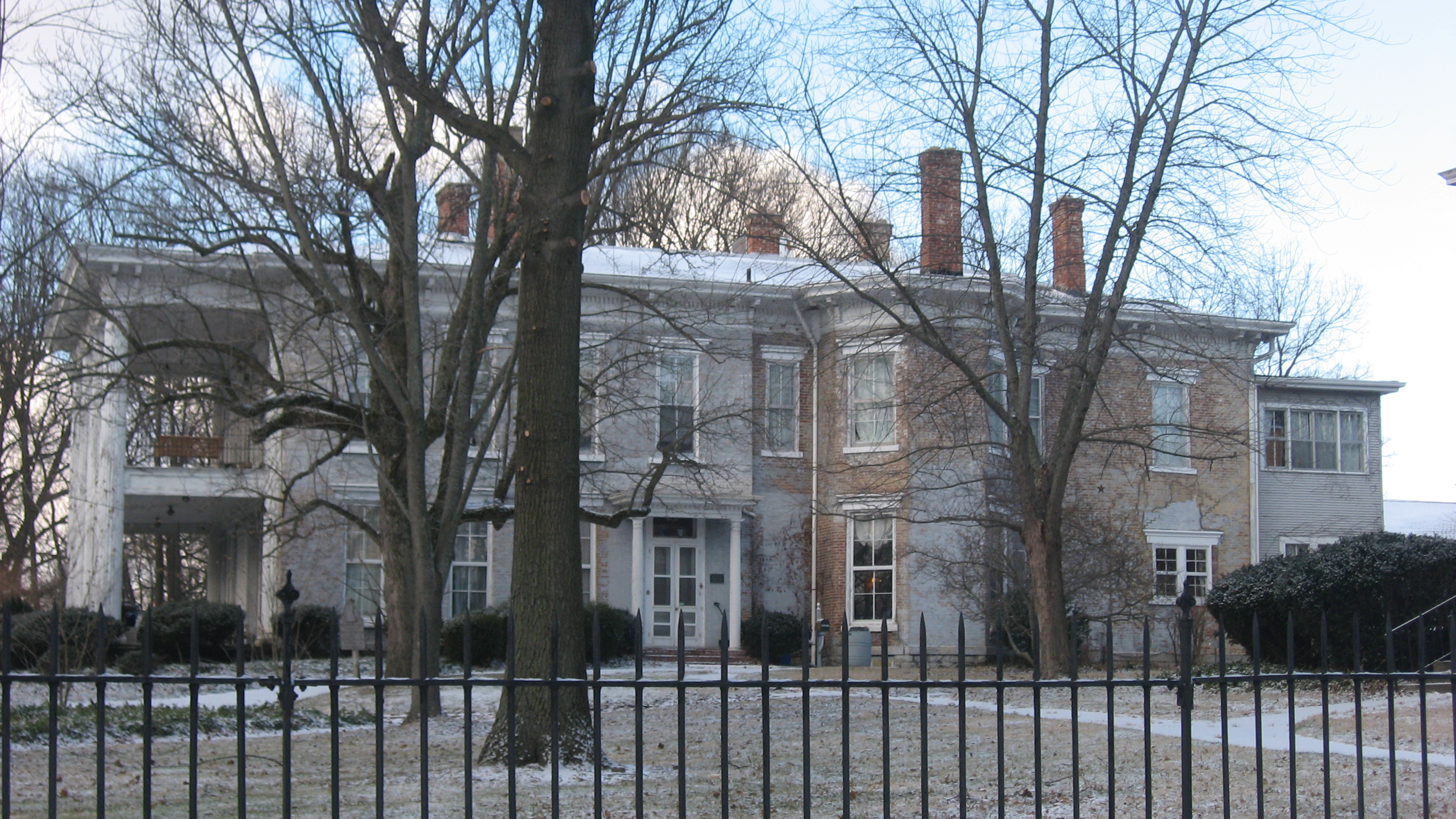
- Shirk-Edwards House, January 2013

- Location within Indiana Location within the United States
- Location: 50 N. Hood St., Peru, Indiana
- Coordinates: 40°45′8″N 86°4′29″W
- Area: 1.5 acres (0.61 ha)
- Built: c. 1862, 1921
- Architect: Harrison, Merritt
- Architectural style: Classical Revival, Italianate
- NRHP reference No.: 95001109
- Added to NRHP: September 14, 1995

Shirk-Edwards House is a historic home located at Peru, Indiana. It was built about 1862, as a two-story, Italianate style brick mansion. It was renovated in 1921 in the Classical Revival. It rests on a limestone foundation and has a low-pitched hipped roof. The front facade features a full-width, two-story porch supported by four full and two engaged columns.

It was listed on the National Register of Historic Places in 1995.

The Shirk-Edwards House was sold at public auction in 2024 for $125,000.00.

It remains privately owned.
