= Miami people =

Indigenous people of the Northeastern Woodlands, U.S.

Miami Myaamiaki
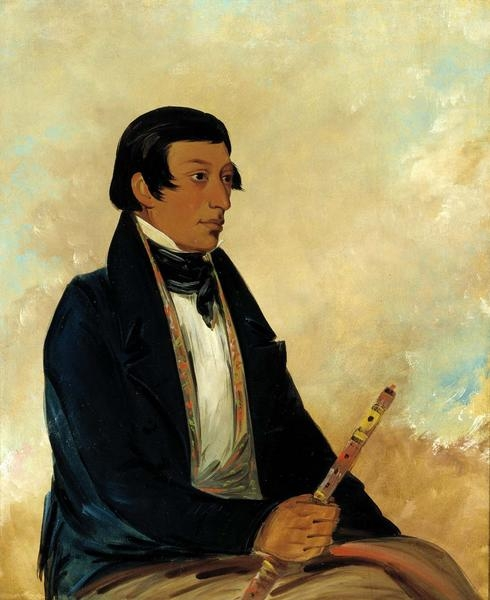
- Kee-món-saw, Little Chief, a Miami chief, painting by George Catlin

Total population
- 3,908 (2011)

Regions with significant populations
- U.S. (Oklahoma and Indiana)

Languages
- English, Miami–Illinois, formerly French

Religion
- Christianity, Indigenous religion

Related ethnic groups
- Peoria, Kaskaskia, Piankashaw, Wea, and other tribes within the Illinois Confederation

The Miami (Miami–Illinois: Myaamiaki) are an Indigenous people of the Northeastern Woodlands, whose Miami–Illinois language is one of the Algonquian languages. They are a Great Lakes tribe, who historically occupied territory in present-day north-central Indiana, southwest Michigan, and western Ohio.

The Miami historically included several subgroups, such as the Piankeshaw, Wea, Pepikokia, Kilatika, Mengakonkia, and Atchakangouen. In last few centuries, Miami refers to the Atchakangouen. By 1846, most of the Miami had been forcefully displaced to Indian Territory (initially to what is now Kansas, and later to what is now part of Oklahoma).

The Miami Tribe of Oklahoma is the federally recognized tribe of Miami Indians in the United States. The Miami Nation of Indiana is an unrecognized tribe that unsuccessfully sought separate recognition.

== Name ==
The name Miami derives from Myaamia (plural Myaamiaki), the tribe's autonym (name for themselves) in their Algonquian language of Miami–Illinois. This appears to have been derived from an older term meaning "downstream people."

Some scholars contended that the Miami called themselves the Twightwee (also spelled Twatwa), supposedly an onomatopoeic reference to their sacred bird, the sandhill crane. Recent studies have shown that Twightwee derives from the Delaware language exonym for the Miamis, tuwéhtuwe, a name of unknown etymology.

Some Miami have stated that this was only a name used by other tribes for the Miami, and not their autonym. They also called themselves Mihtohseeniaki (the people). The Miami continue to use this autonym today.

Name	Source	Name	Source
Maiama		Maumee	later French
Meames		Memilounique	French
Metouseceprinioueks		Myamicks	
		Nation de la Grue	French
Omameeg		Omaumeg	Chippewa
Oumami (or Oumiami)		Oumamik	1st French
Piankashaw		Quikties	
Tawatawas		Titwa	
Tuihtuihronoons		Twechtweys	
Twightwees	Delaware	Wea	band

== History ==
=== Precontact ===
Known locations of the Miami during the Iroquois War years
- 1654: Fox River, southwest of Lake Winnebago
- 1670–95: Wisconsin River, below the Portage to the Fox River
- 1673: Niles, Michigan
- 1679–81: Fort Miamis, at St. Joseph, Michigan
- 1680: Fort Chicago
- 1682–1691: Fort St. Louis, at Starved Rock, Illinois
- 1687: Calumet River, at Blue Island, Illinois
- c. 1691: Wabash River, at the mouth of the Tippecanoe River

Early Miami people are considered to belong to the Fisher tradition of Mississippian culture. Mississippian societies were characterized by maize-based agriculture, chiefdom-level social organization, extensive regional trade networks, hierarchical settlement patterns, and other factors. The historical Miami engaged in hunting, as did other Mississippian peoples.

Written history of the Miami traces back to missionaries and explorers who encountered them in what is now Wisconsin, from which they migrated south and eastwards from the mid-17th century to the mid-18th century, settling on the upper Wabash River and the Maumee River in what is now northeastern Indiana and northwestern Ohio. By oral history, this migration was a return to the region where they had long lived before being invaded during the Beaver Wars by the Haudenosaunee. Early European colonists and traders on the East Coast had fueled demand for furs, and the Haudenosaunee – based in central and western New York – had acquired early access to European firearms through trade and had used them to conquer the Ohio Valley area for use as hunting grounds, which temporarily depopulated as Algonquin woodlands tribes fled west as refugees. The warfare and ensuing social disruption – along with the spread of infectious European diseases such as measles and smallpox for which they had no immunity – contributed to the decimation of Native American populations in the interior.

Historic locations

Year	Location
1658	Northeast of Lake Winnebago, Wisconsin (Fr)
1667	Mississippi Valley of Wisconsin
1670	Head of the Fox River, Wisconsin; Chicago village
1673	St. Joseph River Village, Michigan (River of the Miamis) (Fr),
	Kalamazoo River Village, Michigan
1703	Detroit village, Michigan
1720–63	Miami River locations, Ohio
	Scioto River village (near Columbus), Ohio
1764	Wabash River villages, Indiana
1831	Indian Territory (Oklahoma)

=== European contact ===
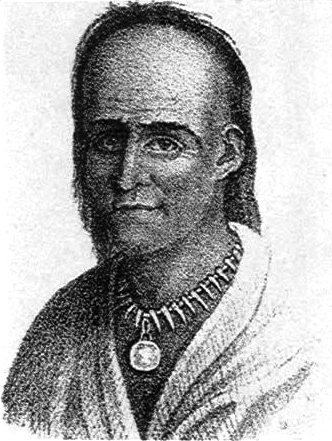
Lithograph of Little Turtle is reputedly based upon a lost portrait by Gilbert Stuart, destroyed when the British burned Washington, D.C. in 1814.

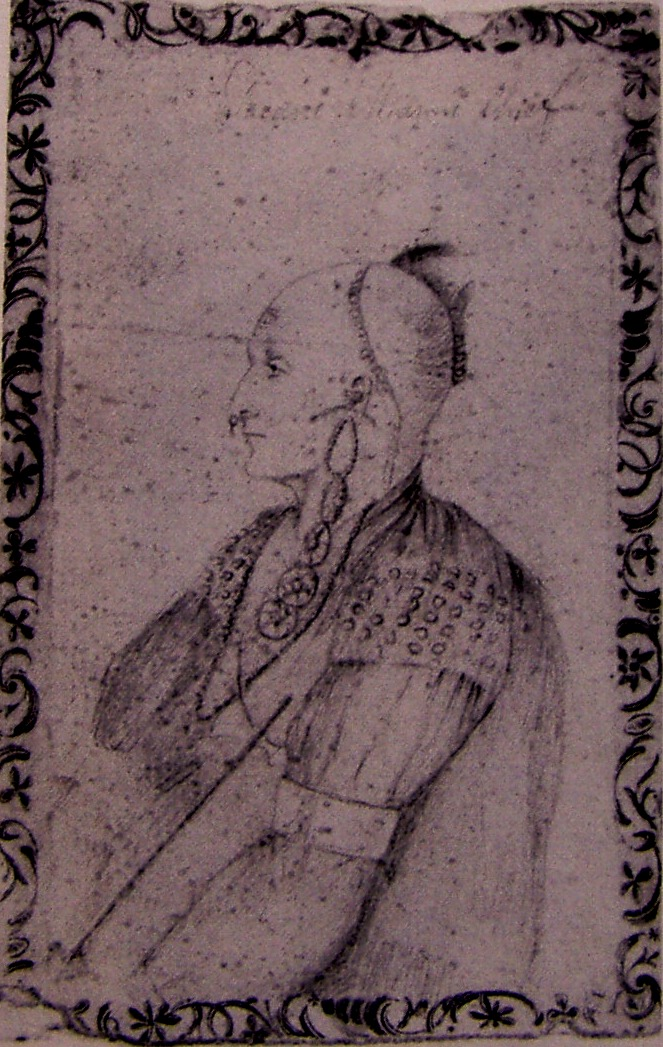
Miami chief Pacanne

When French missionaries first encountered the Miami in the mid-17th century, generating the first written historical record of the tribe, the indigenous people were living around the western shores of Lake Michigan. According to Miami oral tradition, they had moved there a few generations earlier from the region that is now northern Indiana, southern Michigan, and northwestern Ohio to escape pressure from Haudenosaunee war parties seeking to monopolize control over furs in the Ohio Valley. Early French explorers noticed many linguistic and cultural similarities between the Miami bands and the Illiniwek, a loose confederacy of Algonquian-speaking peoples. The term "Miami" has imprecise meaning to historians. In the 17th and 18th centuries, the term "Miami" generally referred to all of these bands as one grand tribe. Over the course of the 19th century, "Miami" came to specifically refer to the Atchakangoen (Crane) band.

Around the beginning of the 18th century, with support from French traders coming down from what is now Canada who supplied them with firearms and wanted to trade with them for furs, the Miami pushed back into their historical territory and resettled it. At this time, the major bands of the Miami were:

- Atchakangouen, Atchatchakangouen, Atchakangouen, Greater Miami or Crane Band (named after their leading clan, largest Miami band – their main village was Kekionga / Kiihkayonki at the confluence of the Saint Joseph (Kociihsa Siipiiwi; ″Bean River″), Saint Marys (Nameewa/Mameewa Siipiiwi; ″River of the Atlantic sturgeon″) and Maumee River (Taawaawa Siipiiwi; ″River of the Odawa″) on the western edge of the Great Black Swamp in present-day Indiana – this place was although called saakiiweeki taawaawa siipiiwi (lit. ″the confluence of the Maumee River″); Kekionga / Kiihkayonki was although the capital of the Miami confederacy)
- Kilatika or Eel River Band of Miamis, (Note: also Kilatak, by the French Kiratika) autonym: Kineepikomeekwaki (″People along the Snake-Fish-River, i.e. Eel River″, their main village Kineepikwameekwa (Note: also Kenapekwamakwah, Kenapocomoco; "Snake-Fish-Town" or "Eel River Village") moved its location from the headwaters of the Eel River (Kineepikwameekwa Siipiiwi) near Columbia City down to its mouth at the Wabash River (Waapaahšiki Siipiiwi; ″Shining White River/Bright Shiny River″) near Logansport in northern Indiana; the Kilatika Band of the French years had their main village at the confluence of the Kankakee River and Des Plaines Rivers to form the Illinois River about 16 km southwest of today's Joliet, Illinois)
- Mengakonkia or Mengkonkia, Michikinikwa ("Little Turtle")' people
- Pepikokia, (Note: also Pepicokea, later known as Tepicon Band or Tippecanoe Band) autonym: Kiteepihkwana (″People of the Place of the buffalo fish″), their main village Kithtippecanuck / Kiteepihkwana (″Place of the buffalo fish″) moved its location various times from the headwaters of the Tippecanoe River (Kiteepihkwana siipiiwi; ″River of the buffalo fish″) east of Old Tip Town to its mouth into the Wabash River (Waapaahšiki Siipiiwi) near Lafayette. Sometimes although known as Nation de la Gruë or Miamis of Meramec River, possibly the name of a Miami–Illinois band named Myaarameekwa (″Ugly Fish, i.e. Catfish Band″) that lived along the Meramec River (″River of the ugly fish″)
- Piankeshaw, (Note: also Piankashaw, Pianguichia) autonym: Peeyankihšiaki (″those who separate″ or ″those who split off″) lived in several villages along the White River (Note: West Fork of the White River was known to the native Miami–Illinois peoples as Wapahani, meaning ″white sands″ or Waapi-nipi Siipiiwi, meaning ″white lake river″.) in western Indiana, the Vermilion River (Peeyankihšiaki Siipiiwi; ″River of the Peeyankihšiaki/Piankashaw″) and Wabash Rivers (Waapaahšiki Siipiiwi) in Illinois and later along the Great Miami River (Ahsenisiipi; ″Rocky River″) in western Ohio, their first main village Peeyankihšionki (″Place of the Peeyankihšiaki/Piankashaw″) was at the confluence of Vermilion River and the Wabash River near Cayuga. One minor settlement was at the confluence of the main tributaries of the Vermilion River near Danville, Illinois, the second important settlement was named Aciipihkahkionki (Chippekawkay / Chippecoke; ″Place of the edible Root″) and was situated at the mouth of the Embarras River in the Wabash River near Vincennes. In the 18th century a third settlement outside the historic Wabash River Valley named Pinkwaawilenionki / Pickawillany was erected along the Great Miami River (which developed into Piqua, Ohio) (Note: Both the Piankashaw and the Wea are known in historic sources as Newcalenous because of their close relationship.)
- Wea, (Note: also Wiatonon, Ouiatanon or Ouaouiatanoukak) autonym: Waayaahtanooki or Waayaahtanwa (″People of the place of the whirlpool″), because their main village Waayaahtanonki (″Place of the whirlpool″) was at the riverside where a whirlpool was in the river, under the term "Ouiatanon" was both referred to a group of extinct five Wea settlements or to their historic tribal lands along the Middle Wabash Valley between the Eel River to the north and the Vermilion River to the south, the ″real″Quiatanon at the mouth of the Wea Creek into the Wabash River was their main village (Note: The common tribal name Wea was shortened from Wiatanon by the British. The spelling Ouiatanon was used by the French with the letters "Ou" representing the sound of "W".)
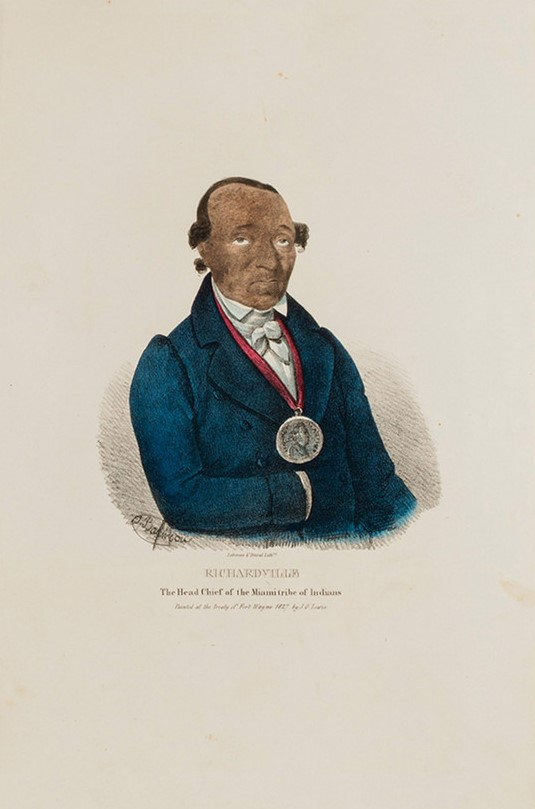
  Jean Baptiste de Richardville, the main chief of the Miami

In 1696, the Comte de Frontenac appointed Jean Baptiste Bissot, Sieur de Vincennes as commander of the French outposts in northeast Indiana and southwest Michigan. He befriended the Miami people, settling first at the St. Joseph River, and, in 1704, establishing a trading post and fort at Kekionga, present-day Fort Wayne, Indiana, the de facto Miami capital which controlled an important land portage linking the Maumee River (which flowed into Lake Erie and offered a water path to Quebec) to the Wabash River (which flowed into the Ohio River and offered a water path to the Mississippi Valley).

By the 18th century, the Miami had for the most part returned to their homeland in present-day Indiana and Ohio. The eventual victory of the British in the French and Indian War (Seven Years' War) led to an increased British presence in traditional Miami areas.

Shifting alliances and the gradual encroachment of European-American settlement led to some Miami bands, including the Piankeshaw, and Wea, effectively merging into what was sometimes called the Miami Confederacy. Native Americans created larger tribal confederacies led by Chief Little Turtle; their alliances were for waging war against Europeans and to fight advancing white settlement, and the broader Miami itself became a subset of the so-called Western Confederacy during the Northwest Indian War.

The U.S. government later included the Miami with the Illini for administrative purposes. The Eel River band maintained a somewhat separate status, which proved beneficial in the removals of the 19th century. The Miami nation's traditional capital was Kekionga.

==== Locations ====
French years

- 1718–94 Kekionga, Portage of the Maumee and Wabash rivers, Fort Wayne, Indiana
- 1720–49 Portage of the Miami River, St. Joseph and Kankakee rivers
- unknown – 1733 Tepicon of the Wabash, Fort Ouiatenon, Lafayette, Indiana
- 1733–51 Tepicon of the Tippecanoe, headwaters of the Tippecanoe River near Warsaw
- 1748–52 Pickawillany, Piqua on the Great Miami River in Ohio
- 1752 Headwaters of the Eel River, southwest of Columbia City, Indiana
- 1752 Le Gris, Maumee River (Miami River), east of Fort Wayne

British years

- 1763 Captured British at Fort Miami (1760–63) as a part of the Pontiac's Rebellion
- 1774 Warriors participated in Lord Dunmore's War in Ohio
- 1778 Kenapacomaqua, Wabash at the mouth of the Eel River, Logansport, Indiana
- 1780 October – Agustin Mottin de La Balme (French, from St. Louis) headed a raid of Detroit. Stopped and raided Kekionga. La Balme withdrew to the west, where Little Turtle destroyed the raiders, killing one third of them, on November 5.

=== United States and Tribal Divide ===
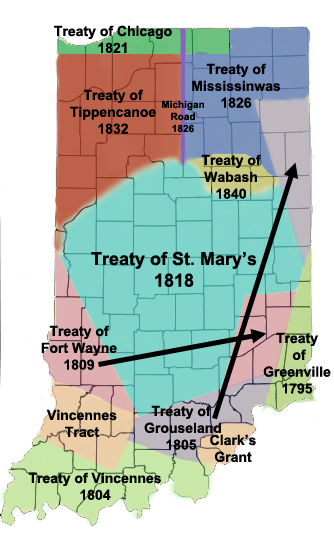
Miami treaties in Indiana

The Miami had mixed relations with the United States. Some villages of the Piankeshaw openly supported the American rebel colonists during the American Revolution, while the villages around Ouiatenon were openly hostile. The Miami of Kekionga remained allies of the British, but were not openly hostile to the United States (except when attacked by Augustin de La Balme in 1780).

In the 1783 Treaty of Paris, which ended the American Revolutionary War, Britain transferred its claim of sovereignty over the Northwest Territory – modern-day Ohio, Indiana, Illinois, Michigan, and Wisconsin – to the new United States. White pioneers pushed into the Ohio Valley, leading to disputes over whether they had a legal right to carve out homesteads and settlements on land the tribes considered unceded territory. The Miami invited tribes displaced by white settlers, the Delaware (Lenape) and Shawnee to resettle at Kekionga, forming the nucleus of the pan-tribal Western Confederacy. War parties attacked white settlers, seeking to drive them out, and whites – including Kentucky militia members – carried out sometimes indiscriminate reprisal attacks on Native American villages. The resulting conflict became known as the Northwest Indian War.

Seeking to bring an end to the rising violence by forcing the tribes to sign treaties ceding land for white settlement, the George Washington administration ordered an attack on Kekionga in 1790; American forces destroyed it but were then repulsed by Little Turtle's warriors. In 1791, Lieutenant Colonel James Wilkinson launched what he thought was a clever raid. At the Battle of Kenapacomaqua, Wilkinson killed 9 Wea and Miami, and captured 34 Miami as prisoners, including a daughter of Miami war chief Little Turtle. Many of the confederation leaders had been considering terms of peace to present to the United States, but when they received news of Wilkinson's raid, they readied for war. Wilkinson's raid thus had the opposite effect and united the tribes for a war. Later in 1791, the Washington administration organized a second expedition to attack Kekionga with further orders to build a fort there to permanently occupy the region, but the Western Confederacy attacked its camp en route and destroyed it; the battle, known as St. Clair's Defeat, is recognized as the worst defeat of an American army by Native Americans in U.S. history. In 1794, a third invading force under General "Mad" Anthony Wayne defeated the confederacy at the Battle of Fallen Timbers, burned tribal settlements along dozens of miles of the Maumee River, and erected Fort Wayne at Kekionga. Wayne then imposed the Treaty of Greenville in 1795, which ended the Northwest Indian War. Under it, confederacy leaders like Little Turtle agreed to cede most of what is now Ohio, along with other tracts to the west including what is now central Detroit, Chicago, and Fort Wayne, in exchange for annual payments.

Those Miami who still resented the United States gathered around Ouiatenon and Prophetstown, where Shawnee Chief Tecumseh led a coalition of Native American nations. Territorial governor William Henry Harrison and his forces destroyed Prophetstown in 1811, and in the War of 1812 – which included a tribal siege of Fort Wayne – attacked Miami villages throughout the Indiana Territory.

Although Wayne had promised in the Treaty of Greenville negotiations that the remaining unceded territory would remain tribal land – the origin of the name "Indiana" – forever, that is not what happened. Wayne would die a year later. White traders who came to Fort Wayne were used by the government to deliver the annual treaty payments to the Miami and other tribes. The traders also sold them alcohol and manufactured goods. Between annuity days, the traders sold them such things on credit, and the tribes repeatedly ran up more debts than the existing payments could cover. Harrison and his successors pursued a policy of leveraging these debts to induce tribal leaders to sign new treaties ceding large swaths of collectively-held reservation land and then to agree to the tribe's removal. As incentives to induce tribal leaders to sign such treaties, the government gave them individual deeds and other personal perks, such as building one chief a mansion. In 1846, the government forced the tribe's rank-and-file to leave, but several major families who had acquired private property to live on through this practice were exempted and permitted to stay in Indiana, creating a bitter schism.

Those who affiliated with the tribe were moved to first to Kansas, then to Oklahoma, where they were given individual allotments of land rather than a reservation as part of efforts to make them assimilate into the American culture of private property and yeoman farming. The U.S. government has recognized what is now the Miami Tribe of Oklahoma as the official tribal government since 1846.

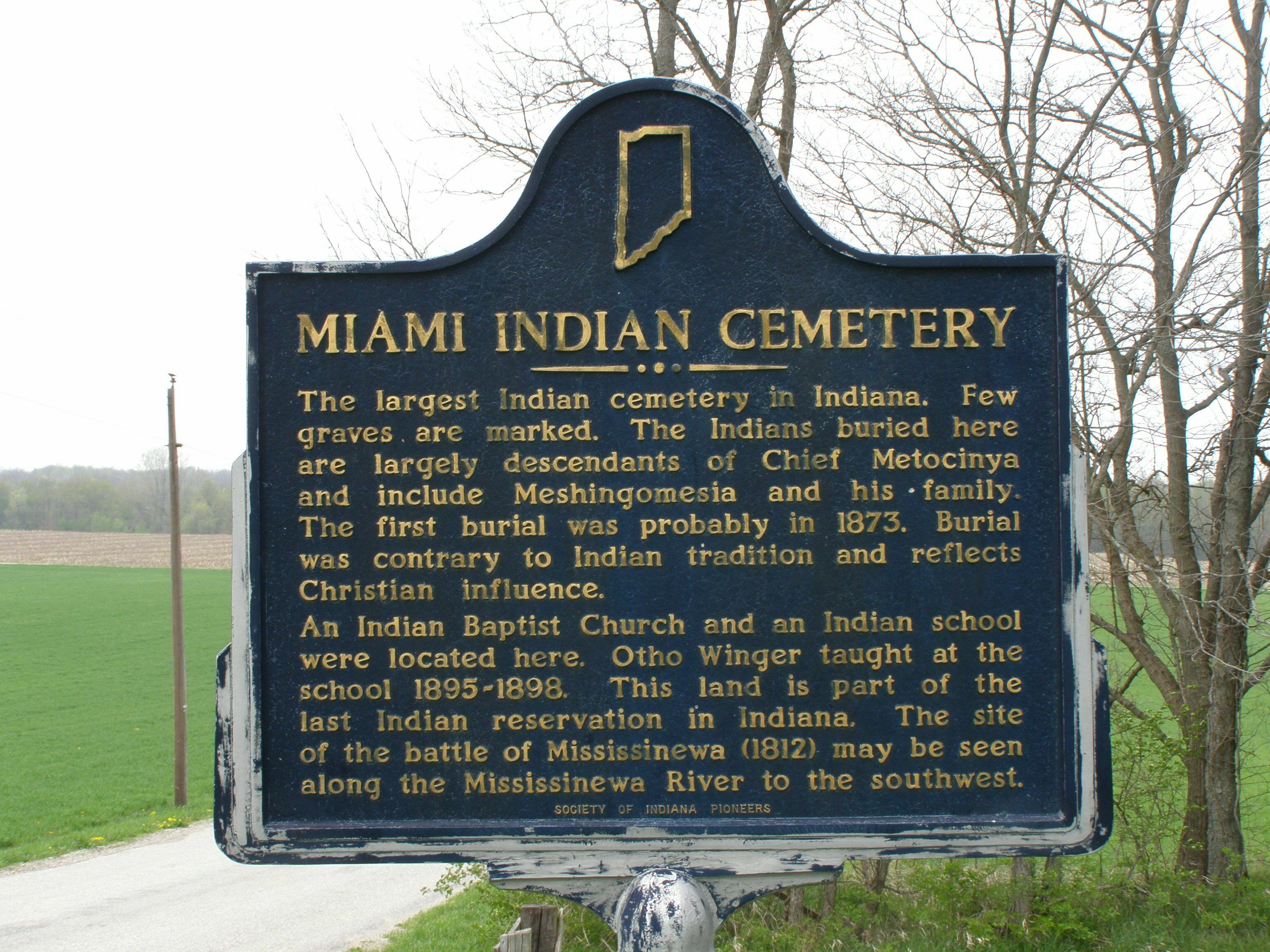
Historical marker in the Miami Indian Cemetery, the largest Indian cemetery in Indiana

In the 20th century, the Indiana-based Miami unsuccessfully sought separate federal recognition. Although they had been recognized by the U.S. in an 1854 treaty, that recognition was stripped in 1897. In 1980, the Indiana legislature recognized the Eastern Miami as a matter of state law and voted to support federal recognition, but in 1993, a federal judge ruled that the statute of limitations on appealing their status had expired. In 1996, the Miami Tribe of Oklahoma changed its constitution to permit any descendant of people on certain historical roles to join, and since then hundreds of Indiana-based Miami have become members. Today the Oklahoma-based Miami tribe has about 5,600 enrolled members. However many other Indiana-based Miami still consider themselves a separate group that has been unfairly denied separate federal recognition. The Miami Nation of Indiana does not have federal tribal recognition. Senate Bill No. 311 was introduced in the Indiana General Assembly in 2011 to formally grant state recognition to the tribe, giving it sole authority to determine its tribal membership, but the bill did not advance to a vote.

==== Locations ====
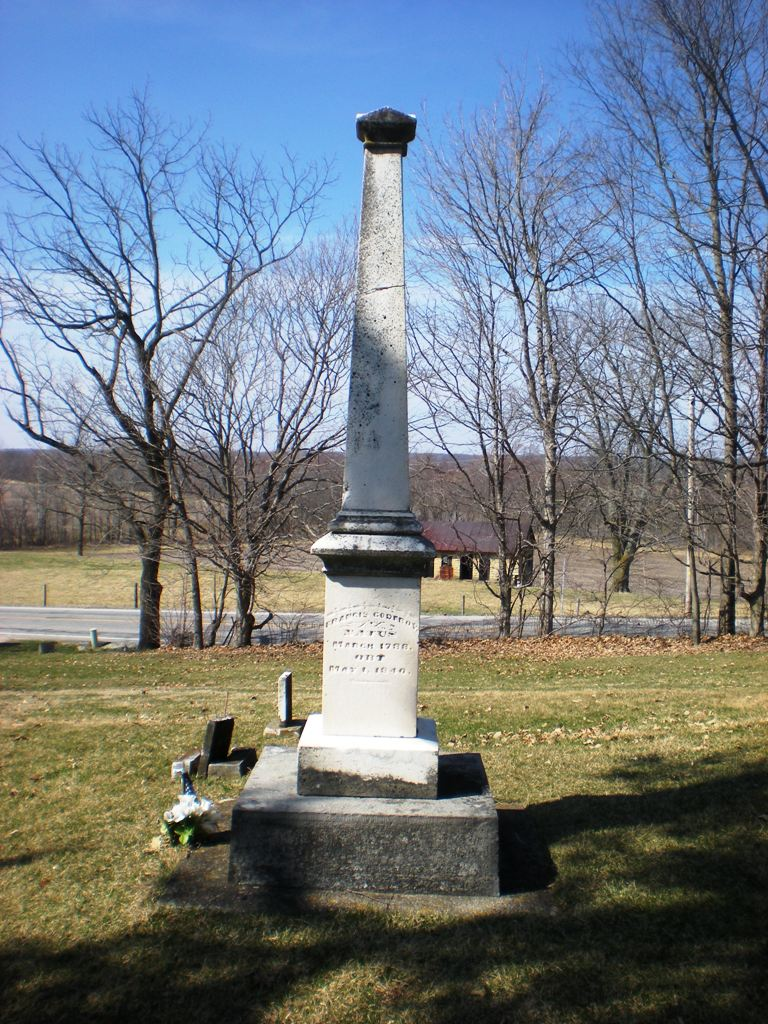
The grave of Miami Chief Francis Godfroy, located at Chief Francis Godfroy Cemetery in Miami County, Indiana

United States years

- 1785 – Delaware villages located near Kekionga (refugees from American settlements)
- 1790 – Pickawillany Miami join Kekionga (refugees from American settlements)
- 1790 Gen. Josiah Harmar is ordered to attack and destroy Kekionga. On October 17, Harmar's forces burn the evacuated villages but are then defeated by Little Turtle's warriors.
- 1790-1791 – Rather than rebuilding Kekionga, tribes resettle further down the Maumee River, including at what is now Defiance, Ohio
- 1791 Gen. Arthur St. Clair attempts to attack Kekionga again and build a fort there, but before he can get there the Western Confederacy attacks his camp and destroys his army near the future Fort Recovery.
- Kentucky Militia destroy Eel River villages.
- 1793 December – General Anthony Wayne launches third invasion and builds Fort Recovery on the site of St. Clair's Defeat.
- 1794 June – Fort Recovery repulses attack by Western Confederacy
- 1794 August – Battle of Fallen Timbers near modern-day Toledo; Wayne's forces defeat Western Confederacy
- 1794 September – Wayne's forces march up the Maumee River, burning tribal villages and fields (where tribes resettled after Harmar destroyed Kekionga) for dozens of miles, before reaching the abandoned ruins of Kekionga at its headwaters and building Fort Wayne
- 1795 – Tribal leaders sign the Treaty of Greenville, ceding most of what is now Ohio as well as the area around Fort Wayne that includes its historic capital of Kekionga and the Maumee-Wabash land portage
- 1809 – Gov. William Henry Harrison orders destruction of all villages within two days' march of Fort Wayne. Villages near Columbia City and Huntington destroyed.
- 1812 17 December – Lt. Col. John B. Campbell ordered to destroy the Mississinewa villages. Campbell destroys villages and kills 8 Indians and 76 were taken prisoner, including 34 women and children.
- 1812 18 December, at Silver Heel's village, a sizeable Native American force counterattacked. The American Indians were outnumbered, but fought fiercely to rescue the captured villagers being held by Campbell, A joint cavalry charge led by Major James McDowell and Captains Trotter and Johnston finally broke the attack. an estimated 30 Indians were killed; Americans repulsed and return to Greenville.
- 1813 July – U.S. Army returns and burns deserted town and crops.
- 1817 Maumee Treaty – lose Ft. Wayne area (1400 Miami counted)
- 1818 Treaty of St. Mary's (New Purchase Treaty) – lose south of the Wabash – Big Miami Reservation created. Grants on the Mississinewa and Wabash given to Josetta Beaubien, Anotoine Bondie, Peter Labadie, Francois Lafontaine, Peter Langlois, Joseph Richardville, and Antoine Rivarre. Miami National Reserve (875,000) created.
- 1818 Eel River Miami settle at Thorntown, northeast of Lebanon).
- 1825 1073 Miami, including the Eel River Miami
- 1826 Mississinewa Treaty – Tribe cedes most of its remaining reservation land in northeastern Indiana, which the government wanted to create a right of way for a canal linking Lake Erie to the Wabash River. Miami chief Jean Baptiste de Richardville receives deed to a large personal property and funds to build a mansion on it for signing. Eel River Miami leave Thorntown, northeast of Lebanon, for Logansport area.
- 1834 Western part of the Big Reservation sold (208,000 acres (840 km^{2}))
- 1838 Potawatomi removed from Indiana. No other Indian tribes in the state. Treaty of 1838 made 43 grants and sold the western portion of the Big Reserve. Richardville exempted from any future removal treaties. Richardsville, Godfroy, Metocina received grants, plus family reserves for Ozahshiquah, Maconzeqyuah (Wife of Benjamin), Osandian, Tahconong, and Wapapincha.
- 1840 Remainder of the Big Reservation (500,000 acres (2,000 km^{2})) sold for lands in Kansas. Godfroy descendants and Meshingomesia (s/o Metocina), sister, brothers and their families exempted from the removal.
- 1846 – October 1, removal was supposed to begin. It began October 6 by canal boat. By ship to Kansas Landing Kansas City and 50 miles (80 km) overland to the reservation. Reached by 9 November.
- 1847 Godfroy Reserve, between the Wabash and Mississinewa
- Wife of Benjamin Reserve, east edge of Godfroy
- Osandian Reserve, on the Mississinewa, southeast boundary of Godfroy
- Wapapincha Reserve, south of Mississinewa at Godfroy/Osandian juncture
- Tahkonong Reserve, southeast of Wapapincha south of Mississinewa
- Ozahshinquah Reserve, on the Mississinewa River, southeast of Peoria
- Meshingomesa Reserve, north side of Mississinewa from Somerset to Jalapa (northwest Grant County)
- 1872 Most reserves were partially sold to non-Indians.
- 1922 All reserves were sold for debt or taxes for the Miamis.

== Places named for the Miami ==
A number of places have been named for the Miami nation. However, Miami, Florida is not named for this tribe, but for the Miami River in Florida, which is in turn named after the unrelated Mayaimi people.

=== Towns and cities ===
- Maumee, Ohio
- Miami, Indiana
- Miami, Oklahoma
- Miami, Missouri
- Miami Bend, Indiana
- Miami Shores, Ohio
- Miami Villa, Ohio
- Miamisburg, Ohio
- Miamitown, Ohio
- Miamiville, Ohio
- New Miami, Ohio
- Miami, Texas

=== Townships ===
- Maumee Township, Allen County, Indiana
- Miami Township, Cass County, Indiana
- Miami Township, Miami County, Kansas
- Miami Township, Reno County, Kansas
- Miami Township, Clermont County, Ohio
- Miami Township, Greene County, Ohio
- Miami Township, Hamilton County, Ohio
- Miami Township, Logan County, Ohio
- Miami Township, Montgomery County, Ohio

=== Counties ===
- Miami County, Indiana
- Miami County, Ohio
- Miami County, Kansas

=== Forts ===
- Fort Miami (Indiana)
- Fort Miami (Michigan)
- Fort Miami (Ohio)

=== Bodies of water and geographical locations ===
- Little Miami River, Great Miami River, and Miami Valley in Ohio
- Maumee River in Indiana and Ohio
- Miami and Erie Canal

=== Institutions ===
- Miami University in Oxford, Ohio

=== Sports teams ===
- Toledo Maumees

== Notable Miami people ==
- Memeskia (Old Briton) (c. 1695–1752), Miami chief
- Francis Godfroy (Palawonza) (1788–1840), Miami Chief
- Tetinchoua, a powerful 17th-century Miami chief
- Little Turtle (Mishikinakwa) (c. 1747–1812), 18th-century war chief
- Pacanne (c. 1737–1816), 18th-century chief
- Francis La Fontaine (1810–1847), last principal chief of the united Miami tribe
- Jean Baptiste de Richardville (Peshewa) (c. 1761–1841), 19th-century chief
- Frances Slocum (Maconaquah) (1773–1847), adopted member of the Miami tribe
- William Wells (Apekonit), adopted member of the Miami tribe
- Daryl Baldwin (Kinwalaniihsia), recognized in 2016 with an award from the MacArthur Foundation; founding director of the Myaamia Center nationally and internationally recognized for its research, planning, and implementation of community language and cultural revitalization efforts at Miami University in Oxford, Ohio

== Cited works ==
- Allison, Harold (1986). The Tragic Saga of the Indiana Indians. Paducah: Turner Publishing Company. ISBN 0-938021-07-9.
- Carter, Harvey Lewis (1987). The Life and Times of Little Turtle: First Sagamore of the Wabash. Urbana: University of Illinois Press. ISBN 978-0-252-01318-8.
- Gilpin, Alec R. (1968) [1958 original edition]. The War of 1812 in the Old Northwest. East Lansing, MI: The Michigan State University Press.
- Magnin, Frédéric (2005). Mottin de la Balme, cavalier des deux mondes et de la liberté (in French). Paris: L'Harmattan. ISBN 2-7475-9080-1.
- Sword, Wiley (1985). President Washington's Indian War: The Struggle for the Old Northwest, 1790–1795. Norman: University of Oklahoma Press. ISBN 0-8061-2488-1.
