= Peru, Indiana =

Town in Indiana

- City
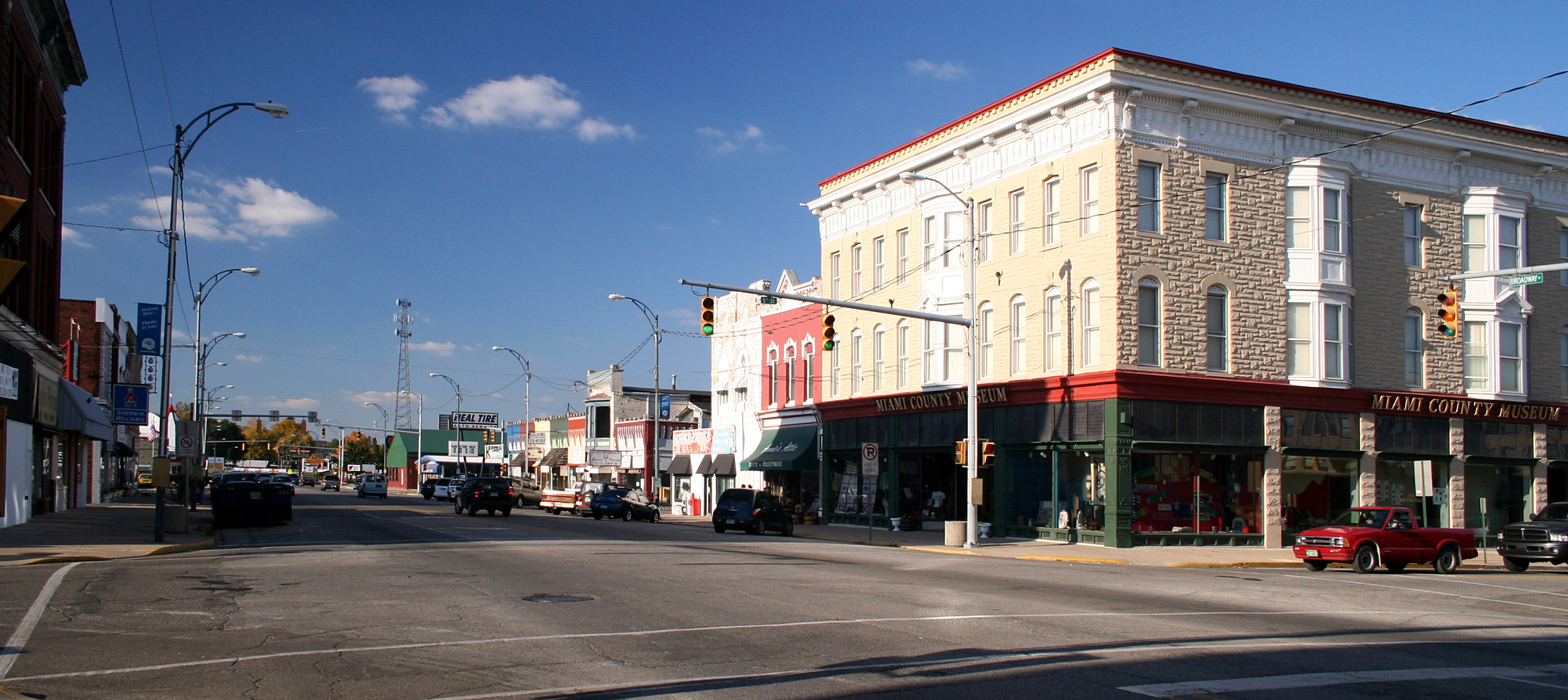
- Downtown Peru

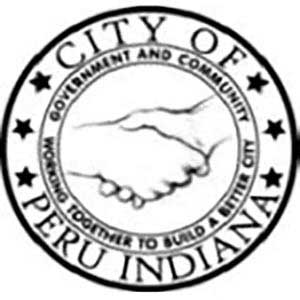
- Seal
- Nickname: Circus Capital of the World
- Location in Miami County, Indiana
- Coordinates: 40°45′28″N 86°04′18″W
- Country: United States
- State: Indiana
- County: Miami
- Townships: Peru, Washington
- Founded: 1834
- Founder: William N. Hood

Government
  - Mayor: Don Sturch (R)

Area
  - Total: 5.14 sq mi (13.32 km^{2})
  - Land: 5.05 sq mi (13.09 km^{2})
  - Water: 0.88 sq mi (2.27 km^{2}) 1.69%
- Elevation: 650 ft (200 m)

Population (2020)
  - Total: 11,073
  - Density: 2,190/sq mi (845.6/km^{2})
- Time zone: UTC-5 (Eastern (EST))
  - Summer (DST): UTC-4 (EDT)
- ZIP codes: 46970-46971
- Area code: 765
- FIPS code: 18-59328
- GNIS feature ID: 2396188
- Website: www.cityofperu.org

Peru is a city in, and the county seat of, Miami County, Indiana, United States. It is 73 miles (117 km) north of Indianapolis. The population was 11,073 at the 2020 census, making it the most populous community in Miami County. Peru is located along the Wabash River and is part of the Kokomo-Peru Combined Statistical Area.

Residents of Peru usually pronounce the name of Peru like the name of the nation of Peru as it is commonly pronounced in American English. Elderly Hoosiers commonly use the archaic pronunciation of /ˈpiːru/ PEE-roo.

== History ==
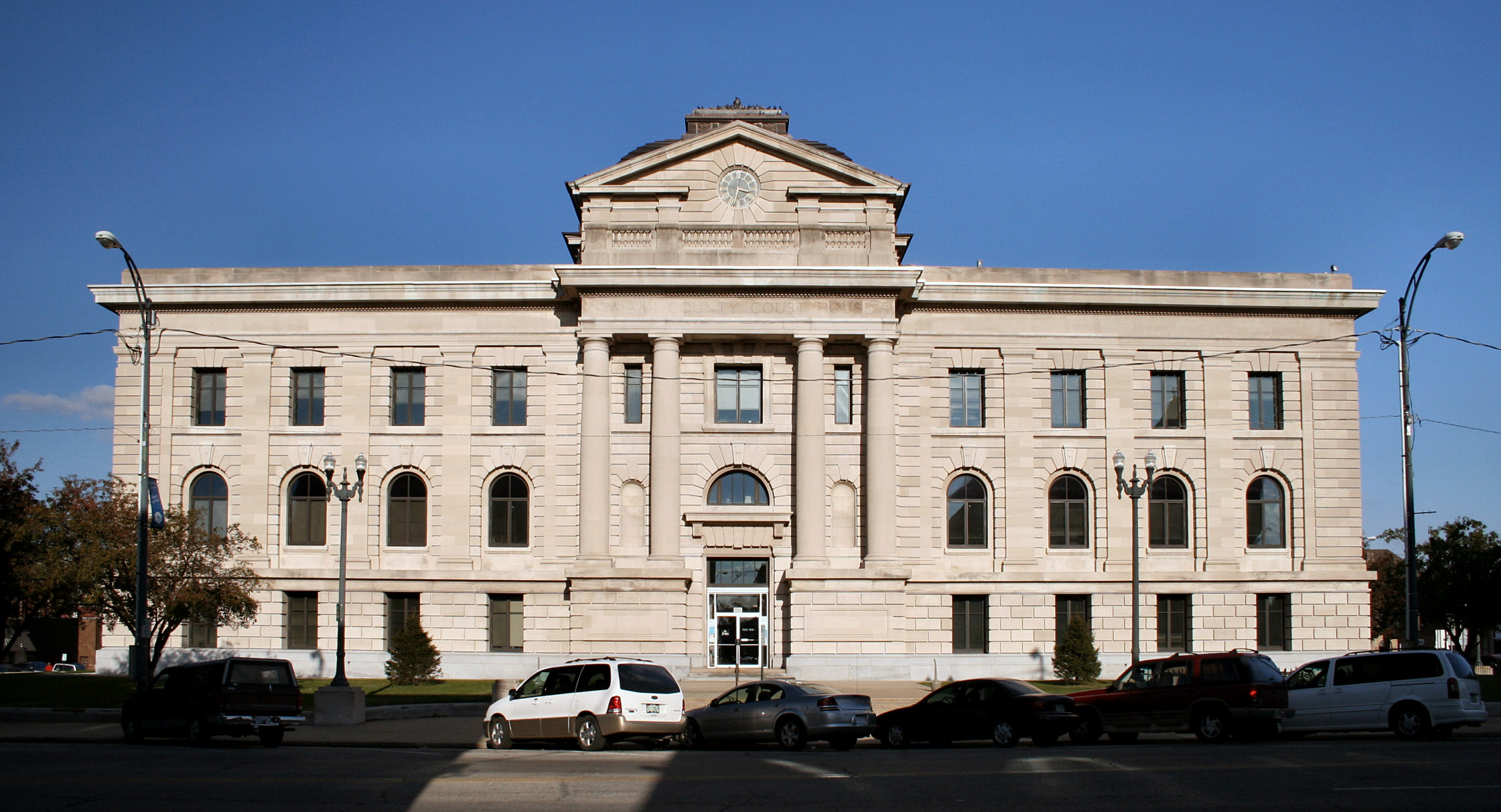
Miami County courthouse

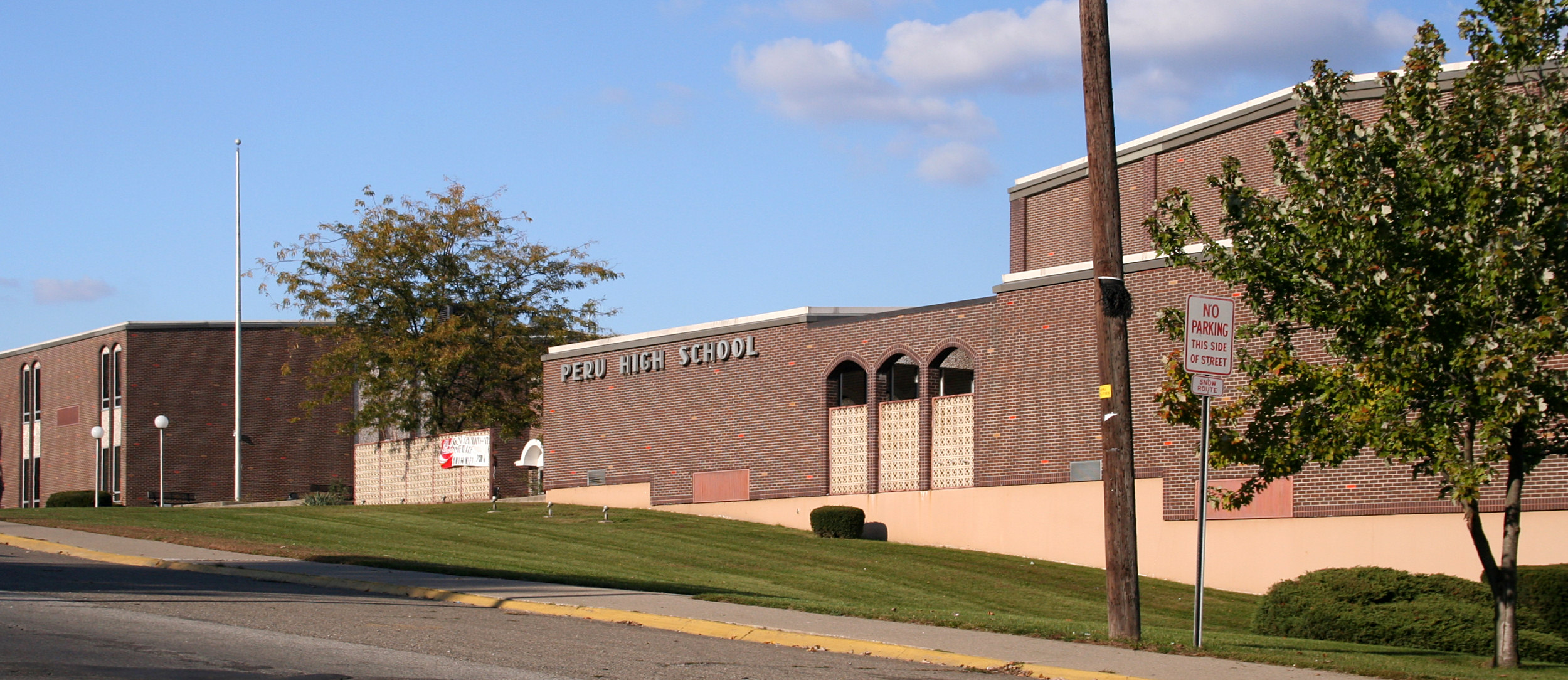
Peru High School

On August 18, 1827, Joseph Holman bought land near the confluence of the Mississinewa and Wabash rivers from Jean Baptiste "Pechewa" (Wildcat) Drouet de Richardville, the chief of the Miami people. The sale was approved on March 3, 1828, by President John Quincy Adams. On March 12, 1829, Holman had the land surveyed and laid out the town of Miamisport.

Peru was founded in 1834 by William N. Hood, who had bought 210 acres (85 hectares) of land from Miamisport's founder Joseph Holman five years earlier. By 1835, court was being held in Peru rather than Miamisport, and the name "Miamisport" quietly disappeared as Peru became the dominant community in the area. Frances Slocum was reunited with members of her family near Peru in 1837, after nearly sixty years of living among Native Americans.

Early in the 20th century, Peru was home to a pioneering automobile maker, Model Automobile Company; like many other early automobile manufacturers, Model did not survive.

In 1913, Peru suffered a massive flood, the worst of its time. Between March 24 and March 27, 6 inches (150 mm) of rain fell on Peru, and sent water from the Wabash and Mississinewa rivers rushing down its streets at speeds of 20 miles per hour (32 km/h), destroying everything in its path. Before the flood of 1913, Peru was a busy town, full of activity and jobs, with 15,000 inhabitants, 100 factories, a trolley service, railroads, a new hospital (Duke's), a circus (which employed 1,000 people on the road), and a new concrete bridge (largest of its kind in the world at the time). The total loss for Peru was estimated at $3,000,000 (1913 figures). Many people died, as well as many of the circus animals.

Public enemy John Dillinger and his gang robbed the Peru police department armory on October 21, 1933. They acquired one Thompson submachine gun, two Winchester rifles, two shotguns, four .38 revolvers and a half-dozen bulletproof vests.

On June 23, 1972, Martin J. McNally hijacked American Airlines Flight 119 while in flight from St. Louis to Tulsa. After receiving a ransom of $502,500, he jumped out of the back of the Boeing 727 in what was the ninth copycat hijacking in the style of D. B. Cooper. The entire ransom as well as a weapon were found near Peru. A fingerprint led to his arrest. The money was found in a 45-pound (20 kg) sealed canvas mail bag by local farmer Lowell Elliott while he was working in his soybean field. Another farmer, Ronald Miller, discovered a Spitfire submachine gun in his corn field when a blade hit it while applying liquid nitrogen fertilizer.

The movie Little Big Top, which starred Sid Haig, was shot and directed in the town of Peru by Peru native Ward Roberts who also wrote the movie. Scenes show the famous drive up to the "Mr. Weenie" restaurant and the Circus building.

The Brownell Block/Senger Dry Goods Company Building, James Omar Cole House, Miami County Courthouse, Peru High School Historic District, and Shirk-Edwards House are listed on the National Register of Historic Places.

=== Circuses ===
Peru was the winter headquarters for several famous circuses, including Hagenbeck–Wallace, Buffalo Bill's Wild West Show, and others. The International Circus Hall of Fame is located in Peru. Annually during the third week of July, the Peru Amateur Circus holds performances for the whole week, ending with the Circus City Festival and Parade. All of the performers are amateurs, ranging in age from 7 to 21 years. Peru is also the home of the world's only remaining manufacturer of steam calliopes.

Mariya Rasputina, daughter of Grigori Rasputin, was mauled by a bear in Peru while working for the Hagenback-Wallace Circus, but survived.

== Geography ==
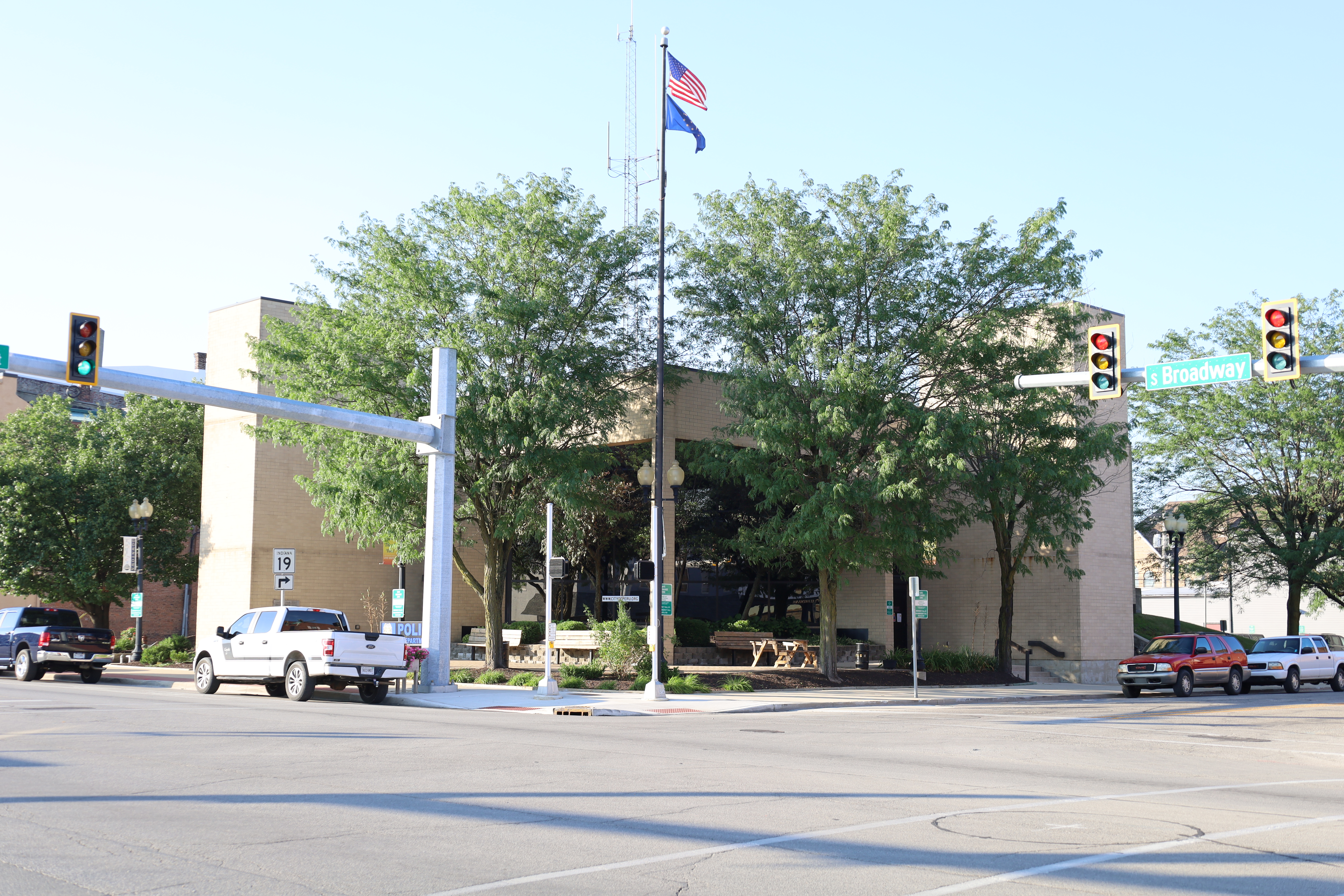
Peru City Hall in 2022

Peru is located in north-central Indiana, in central Miami County, 14 miles (23 km) west of Wabash and 16 miles (26 km) east of Logansport. Indianapolis, the state capital, is 73 miles (117 km) to the south, and South Bend is 71 miles (114 km) to the north.

According to the U.S. Census Bureau, Peru has a total area of 5.14 square miles (13.31 km^{2}), of which 5.06 square miles (13.11 km^{2}) are land and 0.09 square miles (0.23 km^{2}), or 1.69%, are water. The Wabash River flows east to west through the city, south of the downtown area. Across the river, within the city limits, is the neighborhood of South Peru. The Mississinewa River joins the Wabash 1 mile (1.6 km) east (upstream) of the city limits.

Peru is the largest town or city in Miami County and is the site of the tribal headquarters of the Miami Nation.

Peru's water treatment plant tested negative for PFC in September 2015.

== Transportation ==
=== Highways ===
The business route of U.S. Route 31 runs north–south through Peru on North Broadway and West Main Street. The business route of U.S. Route 24 runs east–west through the town on East and West Main Street. Current U.S. 24 follows a four-lane bypass 1.5 miles (2.4 km) north of downtown, while current U.S. 31 is a four-lane highway 3 miles (5 km) west of downtown. The Peru city limits extend north as far as U.S. 24 and then west along that highway as far as its interchange with U.S. 31.

Indiana State Road 19 passes through the center of Peru on Chili Avenue, North Benton Street, East Main Street, and South Broadway. It leads north 8 miles (13 km) to Chili and southeast 14 miles (23 km) to Amboy. State Road 124 (East Riverside Drive) leads east from South Peru 27 miles (43 km) to Mount Etna.

=== Rail ===
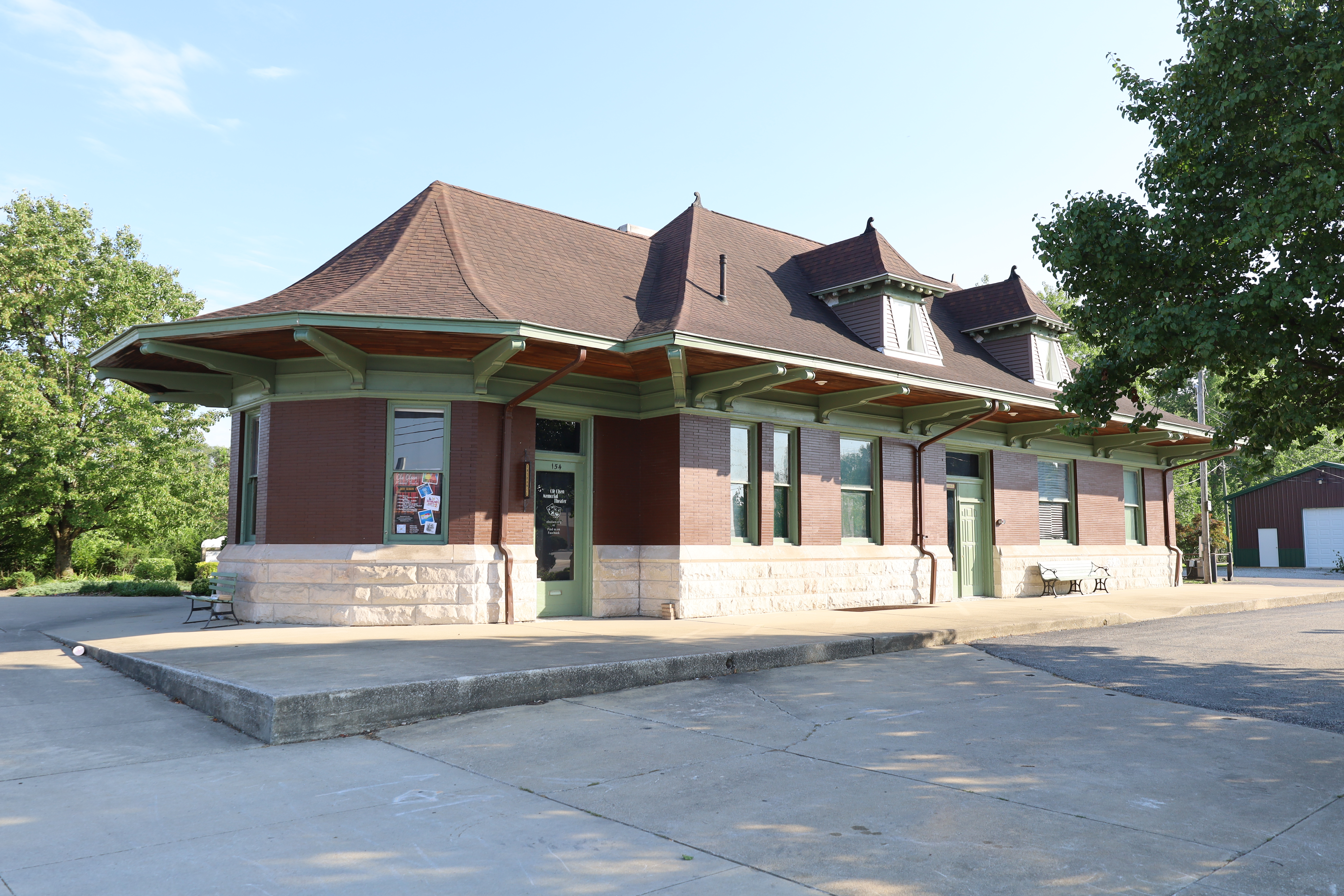
Former rail station

Peru was a stop on Wabash Railroad trains between St. Louis and Detroit. The last train on that line was the Wabash Cannon Ball in 1971. The last Amtrak service was in 1986 when the Chicago–Cincinnati–New York City Cardinal was rerouted out of the town.

In 2024 the only remaining railroad in Peru is the Norfolk Southern Railway.

=== Air ===
Peru Municipal Airport, operated by the city, is located approximately 5 miles (8 km) to the northwest of downtown.

== Demographics ==
Historical population
Census	Pop.	Note	%±
1850	1,266		—
1860	2,506		97.9%
1870	3,617		44.3%
1880	5,280		46.0%
1890	7,028		33.1%
1900	8,463		20.4%
1910	10,910		28.9%
1920	12,410		13.7%
1930	12,730		2.6%
1940	12,432		−2.3%
1950	13,308		7.0%
1960	14,453		8.6%
1970	14,139		−2.2%
1980	13,764		−2.7%
1990	12,843		−6.7%
2000	12,994		1.2%
2010	11,417		−12.1%
2020	11,073		−3.0%
U.S. Decennial Census

=== 2020 census ===
As of the 2020 census, Peru had a population of 11,073. The median age was 40.6 years. 23.1% of residents were under the age of 18 and 18.5% of residents were 65 years of age or older. For every 100 females there were 92.0 males, and for every 100 females age 18 and over there were 88.6 males age 18 and over.

99.5% of residents lived in urban areas, while 0.5% lived in rural areas.

There were 4,802 households in Peru, of which 28.0% had children under the age of 18 living in them. Of all households, 38.0% were married-couple households, 20.8% were households with a male householder and no spouse or partner present, and 32.9% were households with a female householder and no spouse or partner present. About 35.8% of all households were made up of individuals and 15.8% had someone living alone who was 65 years of age or older.

There were 5,448 housing units, of which 11.9% were vacant. The homeowner vacancy rate was 2.2% and the rental vacancy rate was 12.0%.

Racial composition as of the 2020 census
Race	Number	Percent
White	9,933	89.7%
Black or African American	237	2.1%
American Indian and Alaska Native	138	1.2%
Asian	35	0.3%
Native Hawaiian and Other Pacific Islander	2	0.0%
Some other race	106	1.0%
Two or more races	622	5.6%
Hispanic or Latino (of any race)	317	2.9%

=== 2010 census ===
As of the 2010 census, there were 11,417 people, 4,791 households, and 2,961 families living in the city. The population density was 2,234.2 inhabitants per square mile (862.6/km^{2}). There were 5,704 housing units at an average density of 1,116.2 per square mile (431.0/km^{2}). The racial makeup of the city was 93.1% White, 2.5% African American, 1.3% Native American, 0.4% Asian, 0.4% from other races, and 2.3% from two or more races. Hispanic or Latino of any race were 2.4% of the population.

There were 4,791 households, of which 30.8% had children under the age of 18 living with them, 42.0% were married couples living together, 14.9% had a female householder with no husband present, 4.9% had a male householder with no wife present, and 38.2% were non-families. 33.0% of all households were made up of individuals, and 13.5% had someone living alone who was 65 years of age or older. The average household size was 2.36 and the average family size was 2.96.

The median age in the city was 39 years. 24.5% of residents were under the age of 18; 8.8% were between the ages of 18 and 24; 24.1% were from 25 to 44; 27% were from 45 to 64; and 15.6% were 65 years of age or older. The gender makeup of the city was 47.5% male and 52.5% female.

=== 2000 census ===
As of the census of 2000, there were 12,994 people, 5,410 households, and 3,397 families living in the city. The population density was 2,815.5 inhabitants per square mile (1,087.1/km^{2}). There were 5,943 housing units at an average density of 1,287.7 per square mile (497.2/km^{2}). The racial makeup of the city was 92.71% White, 2.95% African American, 1.52% Native American, 0.43% Asian, 0.01% Pacific Islander, and 1.83% from two or more races. Hispanic or Latino of any race were 1.32% of the population.

There were 5,410 households, out of which 30.9% had children under the age of 18 living with them, 45.1% were married couples living together, 13.7% had a female householder with no husband present, and 37.2% were non-families. 32.8% of all households were made up of individuals, and 14.3% had someone living alone who was 65 years of age or older. The average household size was 2.34 and the average family size was 2.97.

In the city, the population was spread out, with 26.1% under the age of 18, 8.7% from 18 to 24, 27.9% from 25 to 44, 21.4% from 45 to 64, and 15.9% who were 65 years of age or older. The median age was 36 years. For every 100 females, there were 88.0 males. For every 100 females age 18 and over, there were 84.1 males.

The median income for a household in the city was $30,668, and the median income for a family was $39,440. Males had a median income of $31,631 versus $20,440 for females. The per capita income for the city was $17,497. About 9.5% of families and 11.8% of the population were below the poverty line, including 18.0% of those under age 18 and 5.9% of those age 65 or over.

== Education ==
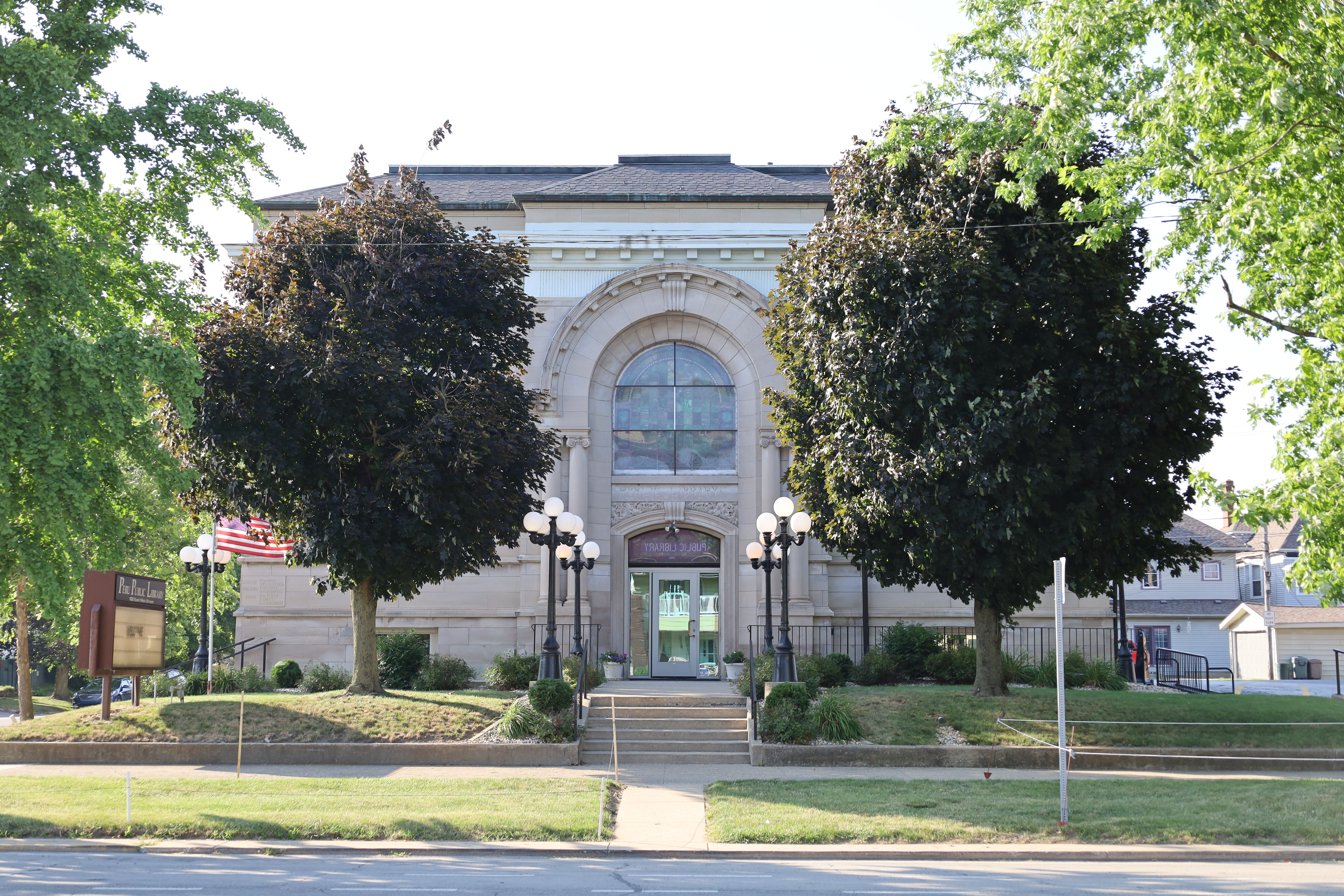
Peru Public Library in 2022

The city has a lending library, the Peru Public Library.

== Notable people ==
- Mary Newbury Adams, suffragist and education advocate
- Richard Antrim, Medal of Honor recipient
- Alfred Bergman, former five-sport letterman at Notre Dame
- Arthur Bergman, football player and coach
- Arthur G. Elvin, engineer, businessman, and the former mayor of two villages in New York state
- Frank Fetter, economist
- Albert Fredrick Ottomar Germann (1886–1976) and Frank Erhart Emmanuel Germann (1887–1974), physical chemists
- Bob Gibbs, U.S. representative from Ohio
- Glenn Griswold, U.S. representative from Indiana
- Emmett Kelly, circus clown, Ringling Brothers Circus, International Circus Hall of Fame, actor
- Kyle Macy, former basketball player and coach; raised in Peru
- Keith O'Conner Murphy, singer and songwriter, member of the Rockabilly Hall of Fame
- Ole Olsen, comedian and member of Olsen and Johnson
- B. J. Penn, briefly served as United States Secretary of the Navy in 2009
- Cole Porter, songwriter; born in Peru
- Ralph Richeson, actor
- Emil Schram, president of the New York Stock Exchange
- Amy Shuman, played women's professional baseball
- G. David Thompson (1899–1965), investment banker, industrialist, and modern art collector
- Robert Edward Weaver, artist, professor emeritus Herron School of Art, Indianapolis
- Nancy Wilson-Pajic, artist, named Knight of the Order of Arts and Letters by the French Ministry of Culture
- John Ross Woodring, newspaper editor
- Carol Lou Woodward, pianist
- Charles K. Bucknum, soldier, fur trader, and politician who served as the mayor of Casper, Wyoming and was a member of the Wyoming Legislature
