= Christian Hoecken =

Jesuit missionary (1808–1851)

Christiaan Jacob Adriaan Hoeken, SJ (1808–1851) was a Jesuit missionary of Dutch origin who worked in the United States among the first nations. He wrote several books in Potawatomi and founded St. Ignatius Mission among the Kalispel. Hoecken died of malaria sailing up the Missouri River.

== Biography ==
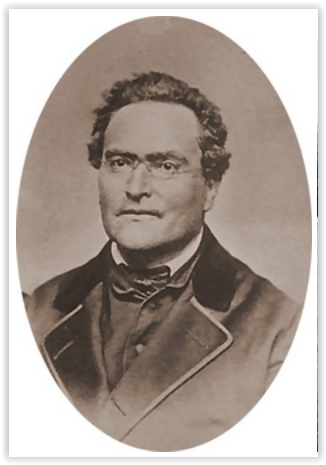
Christiaan J. A. Hoeken (1808-1851)

=== Dutch period ===
Christian Hoecken (born Christiaan Hoeken) was the oldest son of Jacobus Hoeken and Johanna Vermeer. He was born in Tilburg (The Netherlands) and baptized the same day, February 28, 1808. The Hoecken's were very religious; Jacobus was chairman of the parochial choir and all six children would leave the house joining a religious order.

Christian attended two Dutch catholic seminaries in his region (the nowadays southern province North Brabant) namely Beekvliet (1821) and Herlaar (1829). Hoecken was ordained a priest March 20, 1832. He was then sent to the United States 'to work among the Indians' and 'strengthen the young catholic church oversea'. In September that year his ship set sail to Maryland, arriving there August 7. He would never see his parents again. Hoecken was a pioneer in the sense that many fathers and sisters from his home region followed him to the US, among which his younger brother Adrian.

=== Novitiate ===
Hoecken settled at the Jesuit St. Stanislaus Seminary in Florissant, Missouri, for his novitiate. In 1833 the mission among the Indians was entrusted to the Jesuits. In 1836 Hoecken was ready to go out and work as a missionary. He would work 15 years among the first nations and was one of the first companions of father De Smet.

=== Kickapoo mission ===
In 1836 Hoecken started helping the Flemish (Belgian) missionary Van Quickenborne and three of his assistant fathers (Andrew Mazella, Edmund Barry and George Miles) in founding a mission among the Kickapoos in nowadays Kansas. The mission post was installed at Salt Creek close to the Missouri River, between two Indian settlements and 5 miles from the army post Fort Leavenworth (nowadays Kansas City). Hoeckens' group had a budget of 1.000 dollars of their superiors (the Jesuit order) and 500 dollars promised by the government (the Indian Commission) if and when a school would start. A school and a two-storey building were constructed indeed, but the mission failed. Few Kickapoo attended mass and only 14 children were baptized, that is in a camp just outside the fort in 1837. After the death of Van Quickenborne in August that year Hoecken remained a few months at the post, that was to be abandoned.

=== Potawatomi missions ===
Hoecken succeeded Van Quickenborne at the Saint-Stanislaus mission among the Potawatomi on Osage River, Kansas. He gave his flock lessons in agriculture. In 1838 Hoecken visited a group of 150 Potawatomi that were displaced from Wabash River, Indiana, to southeastern Kansas. It took an eight days walk to reach the tribe and he visited them three times that year. In January he stayed for two and a half weeks for the marriage of chief Nesswawke's two daughters. He then returned in May and in October 1838. When he returned in May, the Jesuit fathers De Smet and Pierre Verhaegen were just establishing 'St. Joseph's Mission' at Council Bluffs, Iowa. But there was little success in persuading the tribal members—sometimes called Bluff Indians—to convert to Christianity.

In November 1838 Hoecken took over the charge of father Petit who had joined another group of Potawatomi in a forced 660 miles (1,060 km) march to new reservation lands. St Mary's Mission at Sugar Creek, which he founded in 1839 by building a church and a school, was the true ending point of the Potawatomi Trail of Death. Two years later mother Duchesne joined this mission station in the eastern Kansas reservation. Father Felix Verreydt succeeded Hoecken at Sugar Creek, enabling him to visit other tribes in Kansas and the upper-Missouri region.

In a letter to his parents (December 22, 1839) Hoecken refers to his first missionary activities speaking of the 'Kieke-Paux' and the 'Estawabiniers' on the river banks of the 'Osagis'. Many of the Indians were ill and Hoecken cared for them the best he could, baptizing some of them. Then, 'in another place', father Petit came to him with 750 'savages', including 350 catholic. Armed with a large axe father Hoecken took the lead and in three days a church was ready. But "it was not more than a stable of Betlehem", he writes. In March 1839 the Indians moved again to a place 14 miles (23 km) away and by Lent, they were moving on again, with father Hoecken amidst them. He writes: "At holy mass, the savages sang spiritual songs in their own language. I learned their language in a short time. After 2 or 3 months it was my duty to hear confession in their language. In the beginning it seems very difficult, but indeed it is not."

=== St. Ignatius and other missions ===
Hoecken next visited the Ottawas, strategically converted their chief, and tried to banish alcohol intoxication from among the tribe. After that he preached among the Sioux, Gros Ventres, Ricaree, Mandans, and Assiniboins, of whom he reported to have baptized about 400 persons.

In 1843 Hoecken founded the mission of St. Ignatius among the Kalispiels. He built a church thirty miles (48 km) above the mouth of Clark's River, and converted most of the tribe, at the same time teaching them to build log houses and sow grain. From this station he visited the Zingomenes and four other tribes, and completed the conversion of the Shuyelpi Indians that had been begun by father De Smet. He then went to St. Louis.

=== Early death ===
Hoecken died of malaria at the age of 43 while sailing up the Missouri River back to his post in St. Louis, June 19, 1851. He was aboard the Saint-Ange, a steamboat piloted by Joseph LaBarge with destination Fort Union. Hoecken was in company of De Smet and a group of about 24 fur traders from Canada, Amerika, France, Ireland, Germany, Switzerland and Italy when 'different diseases' deployed, causing the death of nine passengers. The day before, Hoecken had taken confession of De Smet, who was seriously ill as well; but De Smet recovered. From St. Louis University the latter wrote a detailed report of father Hoecken's death to Lyon and Paris, the Jezuit centres in France. Hoecken was provisionally buried near Council Bluffs. One month later he was interred alongside his confrères at the Jesuit seminary in Florissant. When this property was sold in the 1970s, the Jesuits buried there were reinterred at Calvary Cemetery in St.Louis, including Hoecken.

=== Legacy ===
Hoecken was well acquainted with many of the languages of the first nations and their customs. In fact he was a linguist: His native language was Dutch, he wrote his letters in French and was able to communicate in 12 different 'Indian' languages. He wrote a catechism and prayer book in potawatomi. A statue of Christian Hoecken was erected in Fort Pierre and his name is found on a memorial to St Mary's Mission at Sugar Creek.

== Bibliography ==
The following books are mentioned in "Bibliothèque des écrivains de la Compagnie de Jésus, ou Notices bibliographiques de tous les ouvrages publiés par les membres de la Compagnie de Jésus", part 2, by the brothers Augustin and Aloïs de Backer, Luik, 1851:

- Potewatomi Missinoikan Catechisme ipi nemconin echiteck Wayowat Kwiyuk enemadjik, Catholique echinika-sidjik (Catechism and prayer book in Potawatomi for true Christians called Catholics), Cincinnati, Montfort and Conahans, 1844.
- Pewani ipi Potewatomi Missinoikan, Eyowat Nemadjik Catholiques endjik (Children's book in Potawatomi for Catholic Christians), Baltimoinak, John Murphy, Okimissinakisan Ote Missinoikan, 1846.
- Potewatomi Nememissinoikan Ewiyawat nemadjik Catholiques enjick (Prayer book of the Potawatomies for Catholic Christians), Baltimoinak, John Murphy, Okimissinakisan Ote Missinoikan, 1846.'
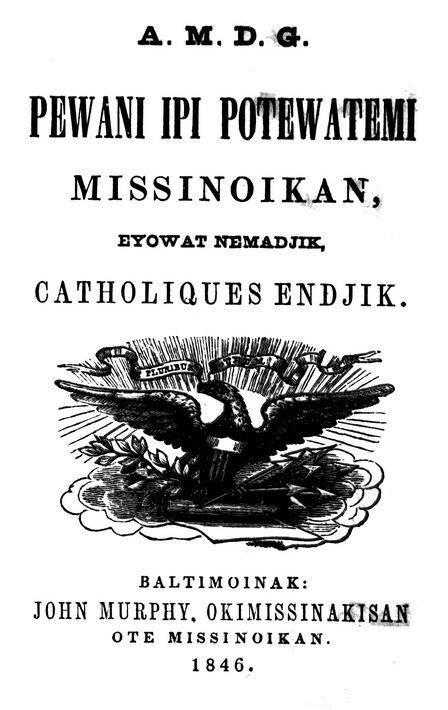
C. Hoecken Catechism in Potewatemi, 1846

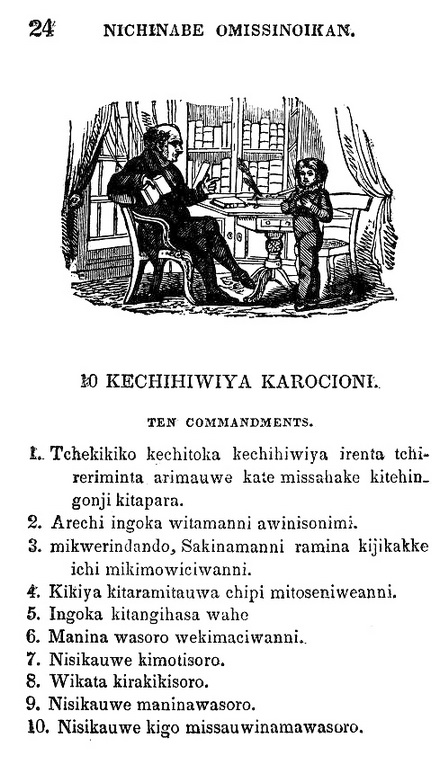
C. Hoecken Catechism in Potewatemi, 1846: Ten commandments.

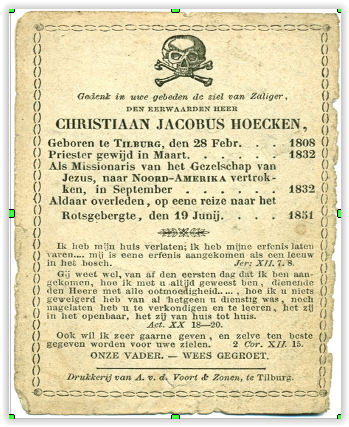
Christiaan Hoecken, Dutch prayer card, 1851

== ...and then this ==
- Christian's surname was spelled Hoeken, as was his father's surname. In the birth register the fourth child (Adrian) and following children had their surname spelled as Hoecken, with the letter C added. Apparently the family choose to do so, probably because this spelling had more standing. So Christian was born with a "k", but died "ck".
- Christian's younger brother Adrian Hoecken (Tilburg, 1815 - Milwaukee, 1897) was also a missionary in the US. Christian met his brother several times. Adrian is less known; for many years he lived with remote tribes -solely- and did not like to report his well and woe to the clerical authorities. In 1866, he became pastor of a parish established for Black Catholics in Cincinnati. On the eve of his death he procured for his church in Cincinnati a painting of a black saint, which was not appreciated.
