= Benjamin Petit =

Catholic missionary

Benjamin Marie Petit
- Born: April 8, 1811; Rennes, Brittany, France
- Died: February 10, 1839 (aged 27); Saint Louis, Missouri, United States
- Other name: Chichipe Outipe (Little Duck)
- Education: University of Rennes (law) in Rennes, France, and Saint-Sulpice Seminary in Paris, France
- Church: Roman Catholic
- Ordained: October 14, 1837, in Vincennes, Indiana
- Title: Priest; Missionary to the Potawatomis

External image
- Fr. Benjamin Petit, 1838, from an oil portrait by artist George Winter.

Benjamin Marie Petit (April 8, 1811 – February 10, 1839) was a Catholic missionary to the Potawatomi at Twin Lakes, Indiana and the Pokagon Potawatomi in southwest Michigan from November 1837 to September 1838. He also served Catholics at St. Joseph Mission in Bertrand, Michigan, and St. Mary of the Lake Mission in South Bend, Indiana. A native of Rennes in Brittany, France, Petit was trained as a lawyer at the University of Rennes, but left the profession after three years to enter the Saint-Sulpice Seminary in Paris to study for the priesthood. In 1836 he decided to move to the United States to become a missionary among the Native Americans. He traveled to New York with a group led by Bishop Simon Bruté, the first bishop of the Catholic Diocese of Vincennes. Petit was sent to Vincennes, Indiana, where Bishop Bruté ordained him as a Roman Catholic priest on October 14, 1837. Within a month the bishop sent the newly ordained priest to work among the Potawatomi in northern Indiana.

Father Petit was known for his compassion toward his Potawatomi parishioners. He also joined them on their forced march to new reservation lands along the Osage River, at the present-day site of Osawatomie, Kansas, in 1838. The journey covered about 660 miles (1,060 km) over 61 days and became known as the Potawatomi Trail of Death. During his return trip to Indiana in 1839, Father Petit became too ill to continue and died at the Jesuit seminary in St. Louis (present-day Saint Louis University) at the age of 27 years, 10 months. His remains are buried under the Log Chapel at the University of Notre Dame. A Potawatomi Trail of Death marker in honor of Father Petit at St. Philippine Duchesne Park in Linn County, Kansas, was dedicated on September 28, 2003. His experiences and observations of his missionary work among the Potawatomi and their march to Kansas survive in the numerous letters he wrote to family, friends, and colleagues.

== Early life and education ==
Benjamin Marie Petit, the son of Mr. and Mrs. Chauvin Petit, was born on April 8, 1811, at Rennes, in Brittany, France. Petit graduated from the University of Rennes in 1829, and from its law school in 1832. After practicing law for three years, he left the profession to enter the Seminary of Saint Sulpice in Paris, France, to begin studies for the priesthood. In 1835, Petit was recruited by Bishop Bruté of Vincennes, Indiana to come to America.

Petit sailed for New York City in June 1836 as part of a group traveling with Bishop Bruté, and arrived on July 21, 1836. Petit was sent to Vincennes, where he received his minor orders on December 16, 1836, and was made a deacon of the Catholic Church on September 23, 1837. Bishop Bruté ordained Petit as a Roman Catholic priest on October 14, 1837, at Vincennes.

== Missionary work ==
=== Twin Lakes mission ===
In October 1837 Bishop Bruté sent the newly ordained priest to the St. Mary of the Lake Mission in South Bend, Indiana, as a replacement for Father Louis Deseille, who died from an illness on September 26, 1837, after having walked several miles from Pokagon's village in Michigan back to South Bend. The St. Mary of the Lake Mission, which later became the University of Notre Dame, served as the central base for Father Petit's visits to the other missions and Catholic homes. He took up primary residence there in a log chapel built by Father Stephen Badin. Father Petit first visited the Twin Lakes mission on November 3, 1837 He mastered all three languages he needed to use: his native French, the English spoken by the Americans and the language of the Potawatomi. He said Mass, taught catechism, and blessed the graves of the dead.

He became known among the Potawatomi as "Chichipe Outipe." Petit also referred to the mission at Twin Lakes as "Chichipe Outipe". This has previously been mistranslated as meaning "Little Duck". with Chichipe correlating with the Potawatomi word for duck, "shishibé." Recently, however, it has been discovered that "outipe" most likely correlates with the Potawatomi word, "wtapik," meaning "forehead." Thus, what Petit wrote in his letters as "Chichipe Outipe," is his French spelling of the phrase, "shishibé wtapik," meaning "duck's head." This discovery is corroborated by Petit, who translates the phrase himself in several instances that had previously gone unnoticed by scholars.

In one letter, to demonstrate his mastery of the Potawatomi language, he closes by writing a phrase in Potawatomi, followed by its translation: “Nin Mackahtaokônia Chichipé Outipé angenickaso gatamikoa tchaiai Muckatahokônia Autchakpock Kick. I, the Black Robe, called the ‘duck's head,’ I greet all the Black Robes from the mouth to the source (Vincennes).”

Having been trained and law and practiced as attorney in France, Petit tried to help the Potawatomi to draft a legal appeal against removal, but to no avail. Within a few months of his arrival, Father Petit had resigned himself to the Potawatomi's impending removal to reservation lands set aside for them west of the Mississippi River. In July 1838 he reported to Bishop Bruté that the Potawatomi's efforts to resist removal from Indiana had failed, and declared "the land is lost, and without recourse, I believe."

Father Petit was known for his compassion and enthusiasm toward his Potawatomi parishioners. He sincerely lamented the Potawatomi's removal from Indiana and the closure of the Catholic mission at Twin Lakes. As he explained in a letter dated September 14, 1838, to his family, "It is sad, I assure you, for a missionary to see a young and vigorous work expire in his arms." He also described his anguish during the mission's final hours: "At the moment of my departure I assembled all my children to speak to them for the last time. I wept and my auditors sobbed aloud; it was indeed a heartrending sight, and over our dying mission we prayed for the success of those they would establish in their new hunting grounds."

=== Potawatomi Trail of Death ===
On August 29, 1838, General John Tipton and a local militia made a surprise visit to the Potawatomi village at Twin Lakes, near Plymouth, Indiana, and in the ensuing days completed preparations for the Potawatomi's forced removal to reservation lands on the banks of the Osage River, at the present-day site of Osawatomie, Kansas. On September 4, General Tipton gave the order to begin the two-month march, which later became known as the Potawatomi Trail of Death. Father Petit was willing to join his Potawatomi parishioners on their journey, "at least until I can place them in the hands of another pastor," but Bishop Bruté initially declined his permission. The Potawatomi began their march to the Kansas territory without Father Petit; however, the bishop soon changed his mind. On September 7, three days after the Potawatomi's departure from Twin Lakes, Father Petit formally accepted General Tipton's invitation to join the caravan.

Father Petit caught up with the caravan at Danville, Illinois, on September 16, 1838, and accompanied the Potawatomi on the remainder of their journey. Father Petit described his arrival at the encampment on Sunday, September 16: "I came in sight of my Christians, under a burning noonday sun, amidst clouds of dust, marching in a line, surrounded by soldiers who were hurrying their steps.... Nearly all the children, weakened by the heat, had fallen into a state of complete languor and depression. I baptized several who were newly born – happy Christians, who with their first step passed from earthly exile to the heavenly sojourn." Tipton commented in a letter dated September 18, 1838, that Father Petit "has, both by example and precept, produced a very favorable change in the morals and industry of the Indians; that his untiring zeal in the cause of civilization has been, and will continue to be, eventually beneficial to those unfortunate Pottawatomies when they reach their new abode."

Of the 859 Potawatomi who began the journey, 756 survived, 42 died, and others escaped. The caravan included 286 horses, 26 wagons, and an armed escort of one hundred soldiers. The journey west covered about 660 miles (1,060 km) over 61 days, often under hot, dry, and dusty conditions. During the journey Father Petit conducted mass, blessed the graves of the dead, and baptized the dying children, including newborns. He also ministered to the sick and assisted the attending physicians as an interpreter. Father Petit became severely ill with high fever, and suffered from exhaustion and weakness, as did many of the Potawatomi. They also suffered from eye inflammation due to the sun, dust, and windy conditions on the trail. He later reported that the conditions began to improve when the caravan arrived in Missouri, especially after the Potawatomi were allowed to hunt for wild game to supplement their diet.

Upon arrival at their reservation lands along the Osage River on November 4, 1838, the Potawatomi were placed under the supervision of the local Indian agent, and Father Petit completed arrangements to transfer his charge to Christian Hoecken, a Jesuit missionary who had worked on the Kickapoo mission. Father Petit, who was severely weakened from the journey, continued to suffer from a serious illness, including fever and exhaustion, and stayed in the area for six weeks to recuperate. On December 23, 1838, Father Petit received a letter from Bishop Bruté that recalled him to Vincennes.

== Death ==
Father Petit and Abram Burnett (Nan-wesh-mah), a Potawatomi friend, began the return to Indiana on January 2, 1839. After 150 miles of travel on horseback, Father Petit became too ill to continue the ride, and took a stage to Jefferson City, Missouri. Still too weak to ride a horse, Father Petit traveled east in an open wagon in the rain and over bad roads to reach the Jesuit seminary on January 15, 1839. He arrived exhausted from his strenuous journey and weakened by successive attacks of fever, with many running sores on his body.

Father Petit hoped to recover at St. Louis and return to Indiana, but his condition worsened on February 6. He died at the Jesuit seminary at 9th and Washington Streets in St. Louis on February 10, 1839, at the age of 27 years, 10 months. A mass was held for him in the seminary's chapel on February 12. Upon receipt of the news of Father Petit's death, Bishop Bruté celebrated a solemn requiem in the St. Francis Xavier Cathedral at Vincennes on February 18, 1839, and delivered a touching eulogy on his favorite missionary, who was known as the "Seraphic Benjamin Petit".

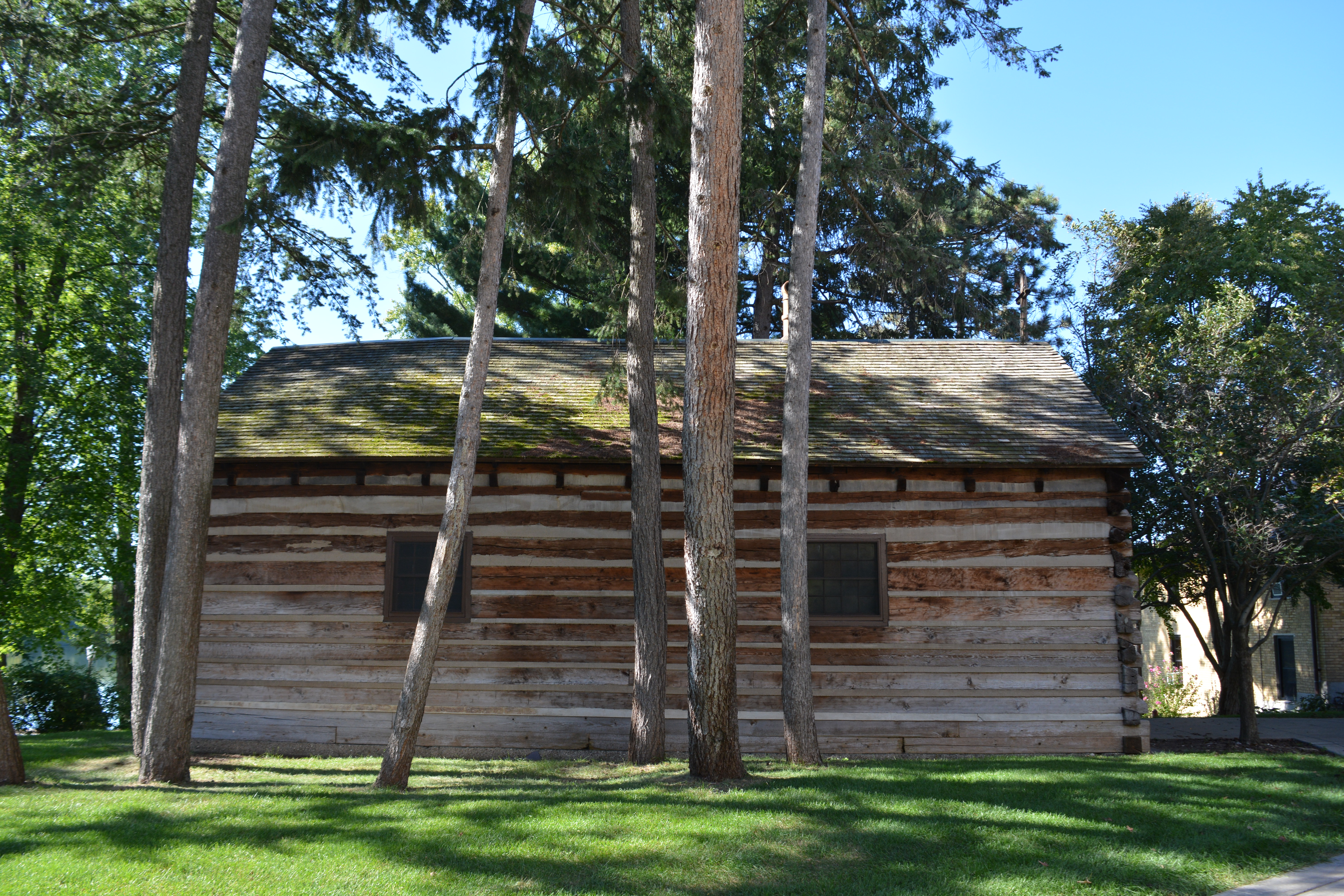
Log Chapel, Notre Dame

Father Petit was initially buried in the old cemetery at 7th Street and St. Charles Avenue in St. Louis. In 1857 Rev. Edward Sorin, C.S.C. brought Father Petit's remains to St. Mary's Lake in Indiana, where he was reinterred in Father Stephen Badin's log chapel, on the site of the present-day University of Notre Dame.

== Legacy and honors ==
Father Petit's remains rest in a place of honor under the Log Chapel at the University of Notre Dame. Because of his devoted service to the Potawatomi, Father Petit is remembered by Notre Dame University as a martyr of charity.

A Potawatomi Trail of Death marker in honor of Father Petit was placed at St. Philippine Duchesne Park, the former site of the Potawatomi's Sugar Creek Mission in Linn County, Kansas. The marker includes boulders from Kansas and Missouri and a Trail of Death route map. The memorial was dedicated on Sunday, September 28, 2003.

Father Petit's chalice, which accompanied him on the Trail of Death from Twin Lakes to Kansas, was returned to Bishop Bruté after Father Petit's death. The chalice is displayed at the St. Francis Xavier Cathedral in Vincennes, Indiana.
