= Mas-saw =

Potawatomi chieftess

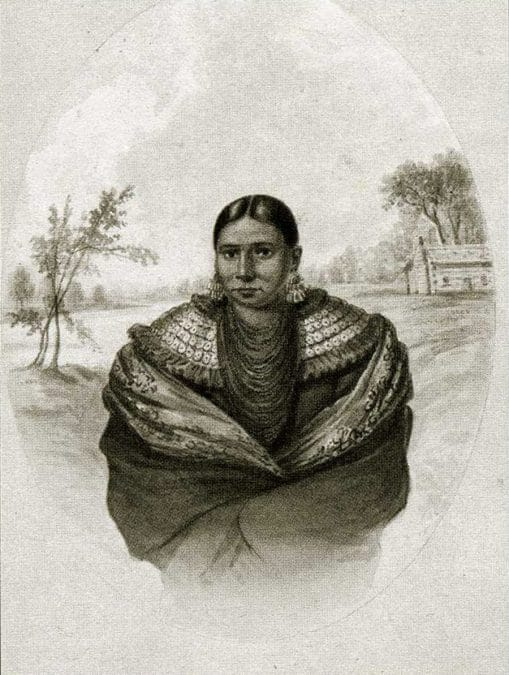
An image of Mas-saw created and published by George Winter, circa 1837

Mas-saw, also spelled Mas-sa, Mas-sah, or Massaw, was an influential leader and Chieftess among the Wabash Potawatomi in Indiana. She was the daughter of the previous chieftain, Chief Wassato. She later married a French fur-trader named Andrew Goslin and had a daughter named Maurie. She later became the great-grandmother of Wathohuk, otherwise known as Jim Thorpe.

She lived in the village of Giwani. She was a key figure in many political activities such as negotiations and treaty signings. Mas-saw's cabin was used for many political meetings because of her status and calm demeanor. Her cabin was located near present-day Yellow River and Lake Bruce in Fulton County, Indiana. The image drawn by George Winter was made in Tippecanoe County, Indiana.

Mas-saw signed the 1836 Treaty with the Potawatomi, a treaty signed by several Potawatomi and Native American leaders. The treaty involved seceding Native land to the U.S. government in exchange for about 14 thousand dollars, and a requirement for the Native people to move west of the Mississippi River within 2 years. Despite this treaty, the "Trail of Death" took place in 1838, from Indiana to Kansas. In this time, out of 850 Native Americans, over 50 died on the route to Kansas.

She was viewed by many as an intelligent leader and kind host. Mas-saw was described by George Winter, the man who created the only art available of her, as a "gambler of no ordinary ability". She had an affinity towards card games and enjoyed gambling games such as poker and euchre.
