= Adrian Hoecken =

Jesuit missionary

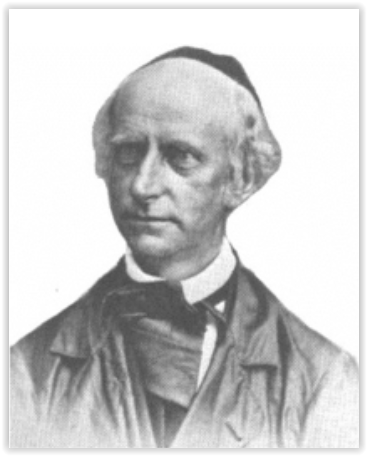
Adrian Hoecken (1815–1897)

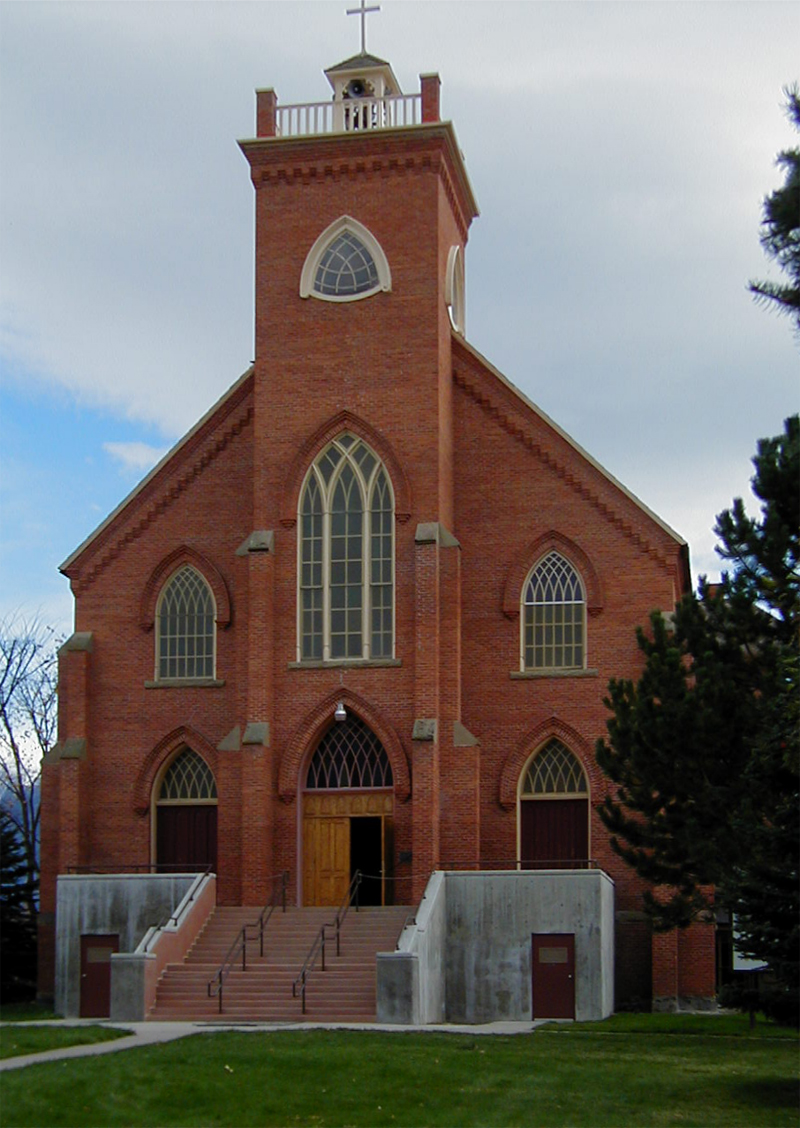
St Ignatius Mission Church, 2005

Adrianus Hoecken, SJ (Tilburg, 1815 – Milwaukee, 1897) was a Jesuit missionary of Dutch origin who worked among different Native American tribes in the United States. He was a younger brother of fellow Jesuit Christian Hoecken and one of the first travel companions of fellow Jesuit Pierre-Jean De Smet.

== Early years ==
Adrian (Adrianus, Adriaan) Hoecken, son of Jacobus Hoeken and Johanna Vermeer, was born in the city of Tilburg in The Netherlands, March 18, 1815. He was the fourth child in a family of six children (three boys, three girls). The Hoeckens had a grocery store, were relatively well off and very religious. Adrian was educated at two dutch catholic seminaries in the (nowadays) southern province North Brabant, namely Beekvliet (1830) and Herlaar (1835). He was consecrated to deacon in Roosendaal, March 24, 1839.

Shortly after his consecration Hoecken followed his older brother Christian as a missionary and was sent to New York. Like his brother and many others at the time he was destined to work among the 'Indians' in America and 'strengthen the young catholic church overseas'. Adrian started his noviciate at St. Stanislaus Seminary in Florissant, Missouri, on December 2, 1839. His brother was already there, to accompany him, until the end of March 1840.

== Among the nations ==
In 1842, after his priesthood ordination in the Cathedral of St. Louis in May 1842, Fr. Hoecken was sent to the Potawatomi Mission on the Osage River in Kansas, led by Christian. In a letter to his parents (July 5, 1842) he asked them to send over 1000 dutch guilders to build a mill.

In 1844 Hoecken was sent to the Rocky Mountains and the Oregon Country Mission that Pierre-Jean De Smet started in 1840. Hoecken first worked among the Kalispel in the Kalispel valley. Later he had missionary excursions to other Indian tribes in modern-day Montana, Washington and Oregon. Most of his time was given to the tribes within or adjacent to what later was to become the Flathead Reservation.

Hoecken lived and worked among the native American nations for nineteen years (1842–1861), particularly the Flathead, Blackfoot and Miniconjou. There was a period of six years in which he recollected he "didn't see a single white man, except for one brother" (lay brother Daniel Lyon). Adrian was more adventurous than his brother Christian, but his manner of speaking was more introverted, with a generous use of First Nations expressions. He scarcely reported to the clerical authorities (who may have wondered if he were still alive), and his writings had less religious referrals.

Along with De Smet, Hoecken founded the St. Ignatius Mission for the Flathead Indians, and moved with this mission to its present location in St. Ignatius, Montana, in 1854. Hoecken stayed attached to this mission until 1861 (the current church was built there between 1891 and 1893). During this time St. Ignatius was known to be the most "civilised and advanced" of all Indian missions.

In 1855, upon request by Washington Territory Governor Isaac Stevens, Fr. Hoecken served as interpreter at the Hellgate treaty negotiations in western Montana. The negotiations with the Bitterroot Salish, Kalispel, and Kootenai tribes suffered huge cross-cultural miscommunications. Hoecken stated that the translations were so poor that "not a tenth of what was said was understood by either side". Hoecken informed De Smet in a letter about the chief of the Kalispel, Etsowish-simmegee-itshin (Grizzly Bear Standing), who was already baptized in 1843.

In 1859 Fr. Hoecken and Br. Vincent Magri set up St. Peters Mission at Priest Butte on the Teton River, on a site just southeast of the current town of Choteau, Montana. They built three log cabins, and were soon joined by father Camillus Imoda. However they had to abandon this site in 1860 and moved their mission to the Sun River, about 8 miles (13 km) upriver from Fort Shaw, near what is now Simms, Montana.

== Subsequent years ==
In November 1860 Fr. Hoecken, fatigued from strenuous years of service, took a few months break at the Jesuit college of Santa Clara in California. In a homesick letter to his family in The Netherlands (that is, to his two brothers and two sisters; his parents had already died, as well as his brother Christian in 1851) he wrote: "Everything looks new to me here, the white faces, their clothes, their language, the brick houses, their storerooms filled with things new in every aspect. Everything still seems so strange, as if I came from another world. Here I see apples and pears that I haven't seen for the last eighteen years."

Returning east, Hoecken occupied different posts. First he was appointed to the Osages in Kansas. In 1865 he was sent to the Jesuit St. Xavier College in Cincinnati, Ohio. Hoecken also served as pastor for St. Ann's Church, founded in 1866 to serve African-Americans in Cincinnati. He procured for the church a painting of St. Benedict The Moor, a patron saint of people with African heritage. Hoecken also paid regular visits to the prisons in Ohio.

To perform lighter duties Fr. Hoecken was transferred to St. Charles, Missouri, in 1880. Three years later he went to Parsons, Kansas, and in 1886 to Milwaukee, Wisconsin, where he served St. Gall's Church. At the age of 82 Hoecken died at Marquette College, Milwaukee, on April 19, 1897. His grave is in Calvary Cemetery in Milwaukee.
