= Log Chapel (University of Notre Dame) =

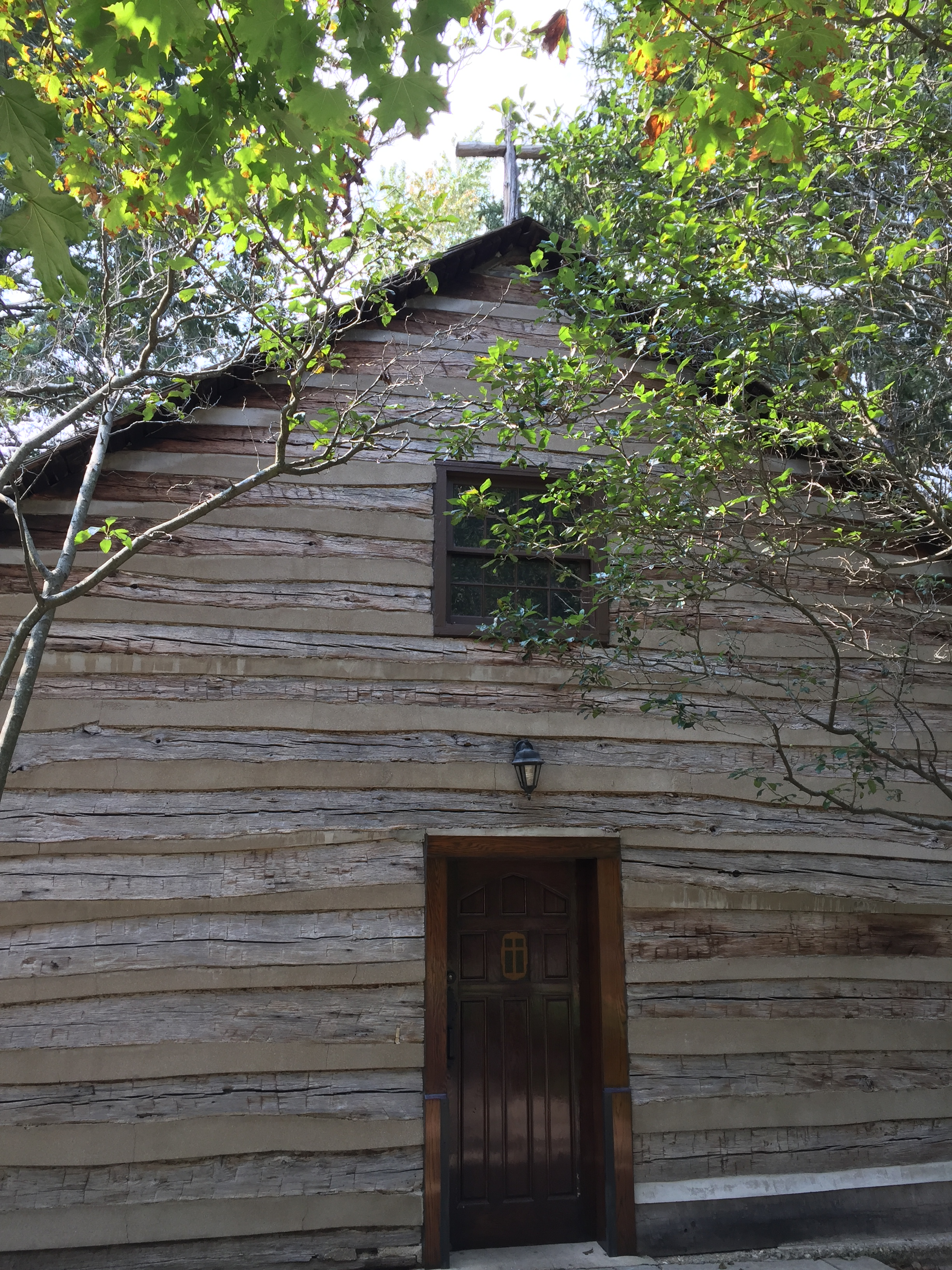
- Log Chapel, Notre Dame
- Interactive map of the Log Chapel area
- Alternative names: Fr. Badin's Chapel

General information
- Status: Used as a chapel and museum
- Type: Religious Chapel
- Architectural style: Log cabin
- Location: Notre Dame, Indiana, United States
- Current tenants: University of Notre Dame
- Years built: 1831 (destroyed 1856) recreated 1906
- Owner: Congregation of Holy Cross

Design and construction
- Architect: Stephen Badin
- Log Chapel
- U.S. Historic district – Contributing property
- Location within Indiana
- Location: Notre Dame, Indiana
- Coordinates: 41°42′05″N 86°14′33″W
- Built: 1906
- Architect: William Arnett
- Architectural style: Log cabin
- Part of: University of Notre Dame: Main and South Quadrangles (ID78000053)
- Added to NRHP: May 23, 1978

The Log Chapel was originally built in 1831 by Rev. Fr. Stephen Badin as a mission to the Potawatomi Indians in what would become northern Indiana. It was one of the first Catholic places of worship in Northern Indiana. It was given in 1842 to Fr. Edward Sorin, and it became the original nucleus of the University of Notre Dame.

When Sorin arrived on campus, the Log Chapel was the main structure standing. It was a 44 by 24 feet log cabin that served as chapel and priest residence. The small structures were also present on site: a small clapboard cabin that housed the Indian interpreter and his family, and a 8 by 6 feet shed. One of the first things that Sorin did was build a second log cabin, which was dedicated on March 19, 1843, slightly to the east of Badin's chapel and about the same size. As the community grew, Badin's Log Chapel was converted into a carpenter's shop on the first floor and a residence for the Holy Cross Brothers on the second, while Sorin's second cabin housed the chapel on the first floor and a residence for the Holy Cross sisters on the second floor.

The original Log Chapel was destroyed in 1856 by a fire, and an identical replica was built in the same spot in 1906.

In 1973 it was added to the National Register of Historic Places.

In February 1987, Fr. Theodore Hesburgh decided to move the burials of Fr. Louis DeSeille, Fr. Benjamin Petit, and Fr. Francis Cointet, from the Basilica crypt to the Log Chapel, where Fr. Badin was buried. All three priests had been buried under the original Chapel before Fr. Sorin moved them to the crypt.
