= Etsowish-simmegee-itshin =

Pend d'Oreilles chief

Etsowish-simmegee-itshin ("Grizzly Bear Standing")

Pend d'Oreilles (Kalispel tribe) leader
- Succeeded by: Victor Alamiken

Personal details
- Died: April 6, 1854
- Nickname: Loyola

Etsowish-simmegee-itshin, or Grizzly Bear Standing was a Chief of the Pend d'Oreilles (Kalispel tribe) in the first half of the 19th century. He became known as Loyola after his baptism under that name by Father De Smet, about 1842 or 1843. His early history is not known, but he was distinguished in his later years for his firm adherence to the Roman Catholic religion and his zealous efforts to lead his people to observe the teachings of the missionaries and the services and ordinances of the church.

Although strict in repressing disorder, Loyola was highly regarded by his people, who regarded him as a father. Towards the end of his life his wife and three children all died "within a short space of time." He died April 6, 1854, and was succeeded by Victor Alamiken, (who was distinct from Victor of the Flathead (Salish) tribe of about the same period.)
