= Sugar Creek (Missouri River tributary) =

Stream in Jackson County, Missouri, U.S.

Coordinates: 39°12′14″N 94°15′01″W

Sugar Creek is a stream in Jackson County in the U.S. state of Missouri. It is a tributary of the Missouri River.

Sugar Creek was named for the maple sugar trees along its course. The city of Sugar Creek takes it name from this creek.

== See also ==
- List of rivers of Missouri
- Sugar Creek, Missouri
