= Potawatomi Trail of Death =

Forced removal by militia in 1838 of Potawatomi people from Indiana

- Part of Indian removal
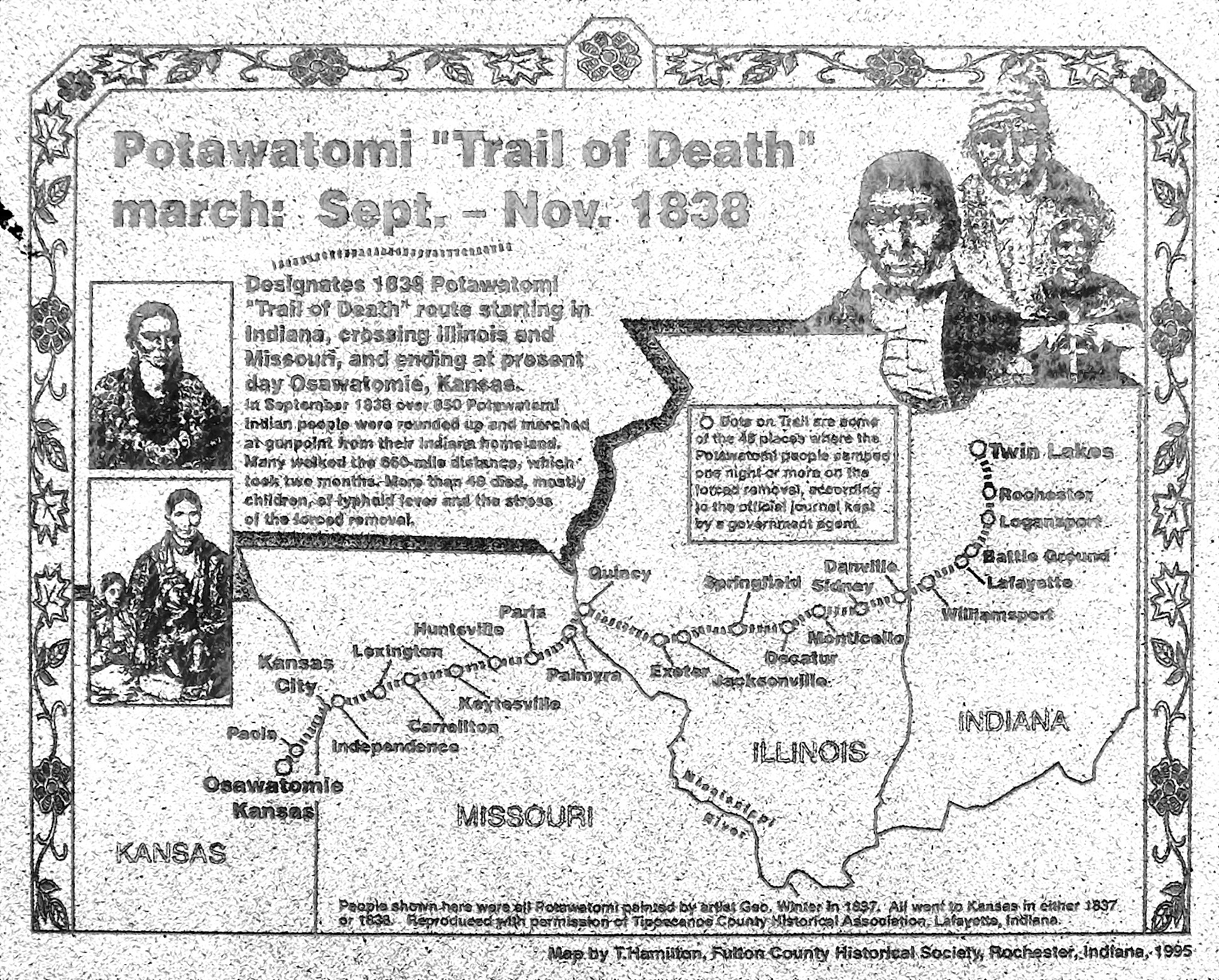
- Map of the trail route: The tribe traveled from Twin Lakes, Indiana, arriving in Osawatomie, Kansas two months later.
- Location: United States
- Date: November 4, 1838; 187 years ago
- Target: Potawatomi
- Attack type: Population transfer, ethnic cleansing
- Deaths: 40+
- Perpetrator: United States
- Motive: Expansionism

The Potawatomi Trail of Death was the forced removal by militia in 1838 of about 859 members of the Potawatomi nation from Indiana to reservation lands in what is now eastern Kansas.

The march began at Twin Lakes, Indiana (Myers Lake and Cook Lake, near Plymouth, Indiana) and ended on November 4, 1838, along the western bank of the Osage River, near present-day Osawatomie, Kansas. During the journey of approximately 660 miles (1,060 km) over 61 days, more than 40 people died, most of them children. It was the single largest Indian removal in Indiana history.

Although the Potawatomi had ceded most of their lands in Indiana to the federal government under a series of treaties made between 1818 and 1832, Chief Menominee refused to sign the Treaty of Yellow River (1836) that would have relinquished the reserve granted to him in the Treaty of Tippecanoe (1832). When the US demanded that Menominee and his band at Twin Lakes leave their reserve, they refused. Indiana governor David Wallace authorized General John Tipton to mobilize a local militia of one hundred volunteers to forcibly remove the Potawatomi from the state. On August 30, 1838, Tipton's militia tricked the Potawatomi into meeting at their chapel at Twin Lakes, where they surrounded them. Shots were fired, then the militia gathered the remaining Potawatomi from other villages as far away as Shipshewana, Indiana for forced removal to Kansas. Father Benjamin Marie Petit, a Catholic missionary at Twin Lakes, joined his parishioners on their difficult journey from Indiana, across Illinois and Missouri, into Kansas. There the Potawatomi were placed under the supervision of the local Indian agent (Jesuit) father Christian Hoecken at Saint Mary's Sugar Creek Mission, the true endpoint of the march.

Historian Jacob Piatt Dunn is credited for naming "The Trail of Death" in his book, True Indian Stories (1909). The Trail of Death was declared a Regional Historic Trail in 1994 by the state legislatures of Indiana, Illinois, and Kansas; Missouri passed similar legislation in 1996. As of 2013, 80 Trail of Death markers were located along the route in all four states, at every 15 to 20 miles where the group had camped between each day's walk. Historic highway signs signal each turn along the way in Indiana in Marshall, Fulton, Cass, Carroll, Tippecanoe, and Warren counties. Many signs are in Illinois, Missouri, and the three Kansas counties. Placement of markers, signage and online maps of the route are coordinated by the Potawatomi Trail of Death Association which exists to collect, preserve, research, interpret and memorialize the Trail of Death.

== Background ==
The Potawatomi language is of Algonquian descent. The tribe moved south from northern Wisconsin and Michigan and historically occupied land from the southern tip of Lake Michigan to Lake Erie, an area encompassing northern Illinois, north central Indiana, and a strip across southern Michigan. Although the land in what became Indiana was long occupied by the Miami, the Potawatomi were also recognized as traditional owners under the Northwest Ordinance of 1787 and in subsequent treaties. They had become the second-largest Native American tribal group in Indiana.

During the War of 1812, the tribe allied with the British Empire in the hope of expelling American settlers encroaching on their lands. The Potawatomi subsequently lived in relative peace with their white neighbors. In 1817, one year after Indiana became a U.S. state, an estimated 2,000 Potawatomi settled along the rivers and lakes north of the Wabash River and south of Lake Michigan. Around then, the state and federal government became eager to open the northern parts of Indiana to settlement and development by European Americans.

Under treaties between the US government and the Potawatomi in 1818, 1821, 1826, and 1828, the native people ceded large portions of their lands in Indiana to the federal government in exchange for annuities in cash and goods, reservation lands within the state, and other provisions. Some tribal members also received individual grants of northern Indiana land. The passage of the Indian Removal Act in 1830 enabled the federal government to offer reservation land in the West in exchange for the purchase of tribal lands east of the Mississippi River.

The government's intent during Indian Removal of the 1830s was to extinguish the land claims of Indian nations in the East, and to remove them from the populated eastern states to the remote and relatively unpopulated lands west of the Mississippi River. Other Indian tribes already controlled large territories there. The Act specifically targeted the Five Civilized Tribes of the Southeast in Georgia, Alabama, Mississippi, and Tennessee. It was also used to arrange removal of other tribes living east of the Mississippi, including several in the former Northwest Territory, south of the Great Lakes.

In three treaties signed in October 1832, at the Tippecanoe River north of Rochester, Indiana, the Potawatomi ceded to the federal government most of their remaining lands in northwestern and north central Indiana in exchange for annuities, small reservation lands in Indiana, and scattered allotments to individuals. They also received the federal government's agreement to provide goods to support the Potawatomi migration efforts, should they decide to relocate. These treaties reduced Potawatomi reservations in Indiana, which included land along the Yellow River.

Under the terms of a treaty made on October 26, 1832, the federal government established Potawatomi reservation lands within the boundaries of their previously ceded lands in Indiana and Illinois in exchange for annuities, cash and goods, and payment of tribal debts, among other provisions. This treaty provided the bands under Potawatomi chiefs Menominee, Peepinohwaw, Notawkah, Mas-saw and Muckkahtahmoway, with a joint grant of 22 sections (14,080 acres) of reservation land. Chief Menominee's signature was recorded with an "x" on the treaty of 1832. He and his Yellow River band at Twin Lakes, Indiana, 5 miles (8.0 km) southwest of present-day Plymouth, would be forced to remove from these reservation lands on the Trail of Death to Kansas in 1838.

Increased pressure from federal government negotiators, especially Colonel Abel C. Pepper, succeeded in getting the Potawatomi to sign more treaties that ceded their lands and obtained their agreement to move to reservations in the West. In treaties negotiated from December 4, 1834, to February 11, 1837, the Potawatomi ceded the remaining reservation lands in Indiana to the federal government. In 1836 alone the Potawatomi signed nine treaties, including the Treaty of Yellow River in Marshall County, Indiana; five treaties on the Tippecanoe River north of Rochester, Indiana; two treaties in Logansport, Indiana; and one treaty at Turkey Creek in Kosciusko County, Indiana. These agreements were called the Whiskey Treaties because whiskey was given to get the Indians to sign. Under the terms of these treaties the Potawatomi agreed to sell their Indiana land to the federal government and move to reservation lands in the West within two years.

One treaty that directly led to the forced removal of the Potawatomi from Twin Lakes was made at Yellow River on August 5, 1836. Under its terms, the Potawatomi ceded the Menominee Reserve, established under an 1832 treaty, to the federal government and agreed to remove west of the Mississippi River within two years. In exchange, the Potawatomi would receive $14,080 for the sale of their 14,080 acres of Indiana reservation lands, after payment of tribal debts were deducted from the proceeds. Chief Menominee and seventeen of the Yellow River band refused to take part in the negotiations and did not recognize the treaty's authority over their land. In a petition dated November 4, 1837, Chief Menominee and other Potawatomi submitted a formal protest to General John Tipton. The chiefs claimed that their signatures on the August 5, 1836, treaty had been forged (Menominee's had been omitted) and the names of other individuals who did not represent the tribe had been added. There is no record of a reply to their petition. They sent additional petitions to President Martin Van Buren and Secretary of War Lewis Cass in 1836 and 1837, but the federal government refused to change its position.

By 1837, some of the Potawatomi bands had peacefully removed to their new lands in Kansas. By August 5, 1838, the deadline for removal from Indiana, most of the Potawatomi had already left, but Chief Menominee and his band at Twin Lakes refused. The following day, August 6, 1838, Col. Pepper called a council at Menominee's village at Twin Lakes, where he explained that the Potawatomi had ceded land in Indiana under the treaty, and they had to remove. Chief Menominee responded through an interpreter:

My brother, the President is just, but he listens to the word of young chiefs who have lied; and when he knows the truth, he will leave me to my own. I have not sold my lands. I will not sell them. I have not signed any treaty, and will not sign any. I am not going to leave my lands, and I do not want to hear anything more about it.

After the council meeting, tensions increased between the Potawatomi and the white settlers who wanted to occupy the reservation lands. Fear of violence caused some settlers to petition Indiana governor David Wallace for protection. Wallace authorized General John Tipton to mobilize a militia of one hundred volunteers to forcibly remove the Potawatomi from their Indiana reservation lands.

Reverend Louis Deseille, a Catholic missionary at Twin Lakes in the 1830s, denounced the Yellow River treaty of 1836 as a fraud and argued, "this band of Indians believe that they have not sold their reservation and that it will remain theirs as long as they live and their children". In response to his support of the Potawatomi's resistance efforts, Col. Pepper ordered Father Deseille to leave the mission at Twin Lakes, or risk arrest for interfering in Indian affairs. Father Deseille went to South Bend, Indiana, although not without protest, and intended to return to Twin Lakes, but died at South Bend on September 26, 1837. Father Deseille's replacement, Reverend Benjamin Marie Petit, arrived at Twin Lakes in November 1837. Within a few months Father Petit had resigned himself to the Potawatomi's removal from Twin Lakes. Father Petit received permission to join his parishioners on the forced march to Kansas in 1838.

== Removal ==
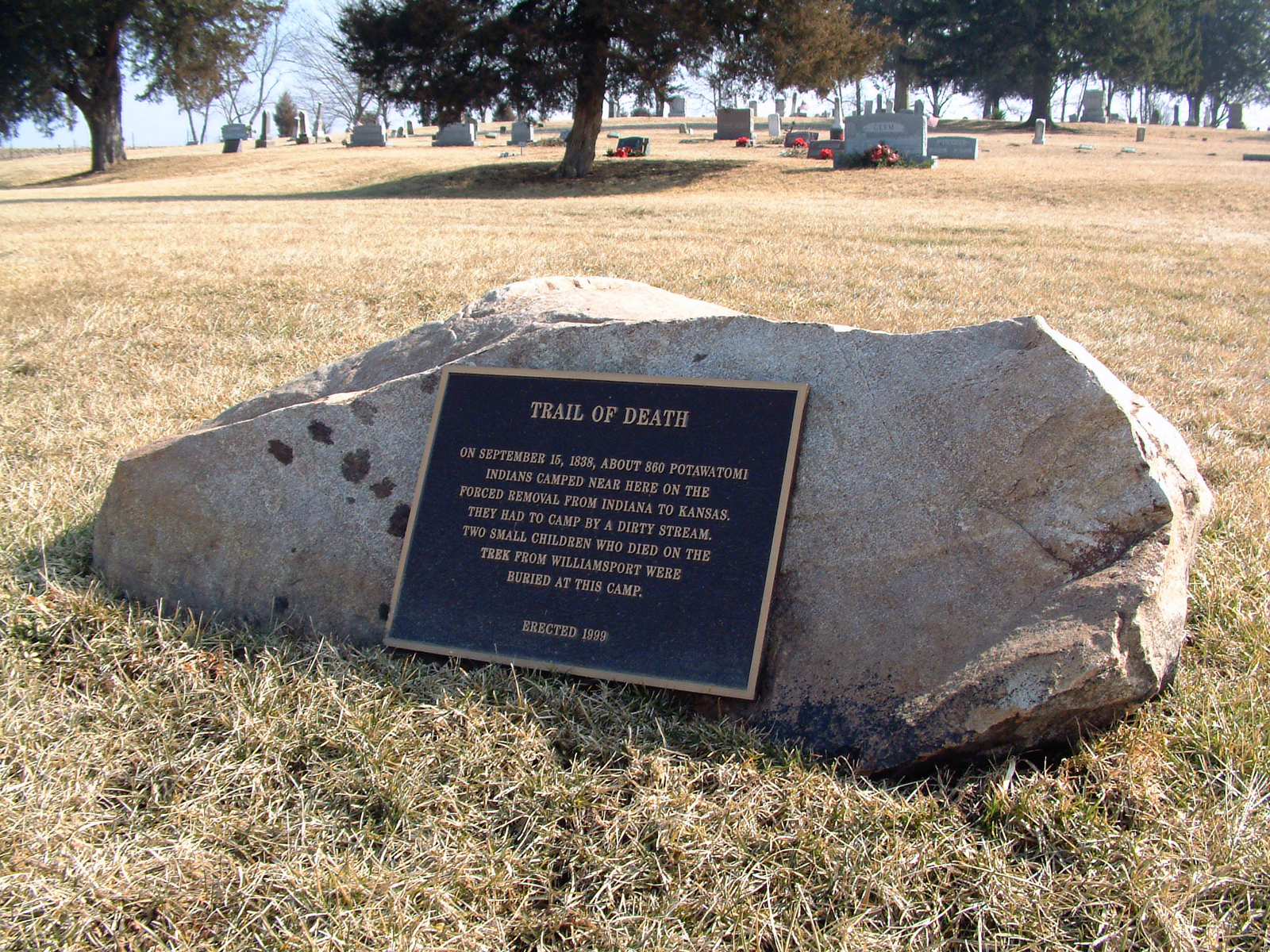
A Trail of Death marker is in Warren County, Indiana.

On August 30, 1838, General Tipton and his volunteer militia surprised the Potawatomi village at Twin Lakes. When Makkahtahmoway, Chief Black Wolf's elderly mother, heard the soldiers firing their rifles she was so badly frightened that she hid in the nearby woods for six days. Unable to walk with a wounded foot, she was found by another Indian, who was looking for his horse, and brought to South Bend. Upon his arrival Tipton allegedly called for a meeting at the village chapel, where he detained the Potawatomi chiefs as prisoners. Although Father Petit was in South Bend at the time of the militia's arrival, he later protested that the Potawatomi had been taken by surprise under "the ruse of calling a council". Tipton reported that several of the Potawatomi had already gathered near the chapel when he arrived, but acknowledged that the Potawatomi were not allowed to leave "until matters were amicably settled" and they had agreed to give up their Indiana land.

Between Thursday, August 30, and Monday, September 3, 1838, the day before their departure, Tipton and his militia surrounded Menominee's village at Twin Lakes, gathered the remaining Potawatomi together, and made preparations for their removal to Kansas. The names of the Potawatomi heads of families and other individuals, which numbered 859 in all, were recorded on tribal registration rolls. In addition, the soldiers burned the crops and destroyed the Potawatomi village, which consisted of approximately 100 structures, to discourage them from trying to return. Father Petit closed the mission church at Menominee's village, explaining in a letter to his family dated September 14, 1838, "It is sad, I assure you, for a missionary to see a young and vigorous work expire in his arms."

The journey from Twin Lakes, Indiana, to Osawatomie, Kansas, began on September 4, 1838. It covered about 660 miles (1,060 km) across 61 days, often under hot, dry, and dusty conditions. The caravan of 859 Potawatomi also included 286 horses, 26 wagons, and an armed escort of one hundred soldiers. The first confirmed death was of a Native child in Mud Creek, Indiana. During the journey to Kansas, 42 people died, 28 of them children. Historian Jacob Piatt Dunn is credited for naming the Potawatomi's forced march "The Trail of Death" in his book, True Indian Stories (1909). It was the single largest Indian removal in the state.

Journals, letters, and newspaper accounts of the journey provide details of the route, weather, and living conditions. Eyewitness accounts from those who accompanied the Potawatomi on the march, including as John Tipton, Father Petit, and Judge William Polke (although Polke's journal was written by his agent, Jesse C. Douglass), provide day-to-day descriptions of their experiences. Tipton led the militia as the group's military escort. Judge Polke, from Rochester, Indiana, served as the federal agent for the group and conducted the caravan to Kansas. Father Petit led religious services and administered to the sick and dying. The caravan also had an attending physician, Dr. Jerolaman, who joined the group in Logansport, Indiana. Local physicians occasionally visited the encampments as the group journeyed west.

== March ==
On September 4, the march to Kansas began. Three chiefs, Menominee, Makkatahmoway (Black Wolf), and Pepinawa, were treated as prisoners and forced to ride in a wagon under armed guard. Father Petit secured their release from the wagon at Danville, Illinois, after giving his word that they would not try to escape. Father Petit later described the caravan in a letter to Bishop Simon Brute at Vincennes, Indiana, dated November 13, 1838, from the Osage River country of Missouri:

The order of march was as follows: the United States flag, carried by a dragoon; then one of the principal officers, next the staff baggage carts, then the carriage, which during the whole trip was kept for the use of the Indian chiefs, then one or two chiefs on horseback led a line of 250 to 300 horses ridden by men, women, children in single file, after the manner of savages. On the flanks of the line at equal distance from each other were the dragoons and volunteers, hastening the stragglers, often with severe gestures and bitter words. After this cavalry came a file of forty baggage wagons filled with luggage and Indians. The sick were lying in them, rudely jolted, under a canvas which, far from protecting them from the dust and heat, only deprived them of air, for they were as if buried under this burning canopy—several died thus.

On the first day, September 4, 1838, the group traveled 21 miles (34 km) and camped at Chippeway village on the Tippecanoe River, 2 miles (3.2 km) north of Rochester. They camped from William Polke's house to his trading post on the Tippecanoe River, a mile long of campfires. The second day they left 51 sick persons at Chippeway. They marched single file down Rochester's Main Street, at gunpoint. Ten year old William Ward followed them to a mile south of Rochester, wishing to go west with his little friends, but his mother caught up with him and took him home. They reached Mud Creek in Fulton County, where one infant died–the caravan's first casualty. By the third day, September 6, they reached Logansport, Indiana, where the encampment was described as "a scene of desolation; on all sides were the sick and dying". The group remained at Logansport until September 9. About 50 of the sick and elderly and their caregivers were left at Logansport to recover; most of them were well enough to rejoin the group within a few days. During this part of the journey the group traveled along the Michigan Road on land the tribe had ceded to the federal government for its construction in 1826. On September 10, the march resumed from Logansport and continued along the north side of the Wabash River, passing through present-day Pittsburg, Battle Ground, and Lafayette to reach Williamsport, Indiana, on September 14. Two or more deaths occurring nearly every day. Their last encampment in Indiana was along an "unhealthy and filthy looking stream", near the Indiana-Illinois state line.

On September 16, the caravan crossed into Illinois and camped at Danville, where four more Potawatomi died and were buried. Father Petit joined the caravan at Danville and traveled with the Potawatomi to Kansas, tending to the sick and the religious needs of the group. According to Tipton's written comments, Father Petit, "produced a very favorable change in the morals and industry of the Indians". Father Petit described his arrival at the camp in his journal:

On Sunday, September 16, I came in sight of my Christians, under a burning noonday sun, amidst clouds of dust, marching in a line, surrounded by soldiers who were hurrying their steps.... Nearly all the children, weakened by the heat, had fallen into a state of complete languor and depression. I baptized several who were newly born – happy Christians, who with their first step passed from earthly exile to the heavenly sojourn.

After their arrival at Danville, the group traveled 6 miles (9.7 km) to Sandusky Point (which became Catlin, Illinois), where the caravan resupplied and rested from September 17–20 before continuing their journey. On September 20, General Tipton left fifteen of his soldiers with the caravan and departed with the remainder of the militia on a return trip to Indiana. Judge Polke led the Potawatomi the rest of the way to their new reservation. Between September 20 and October 10, the Potawatomi traveled through the Illinois prairie, passing Monticello, Decatur, Springfield, New Berlin, Jacksonville, Exeter, and Naples, where they ferried across the Illinois River. On October 10, the group left Illinois, crossed the Mississippi River into Missouri on steam-powered ferry boats from Quincy, Illinois.

According to Father Petit's accounts, "After arriving in Missouri, we had hardly any sick", and the Indians were allowed to hunt for wild game to supplement their diet. Marching through Missouri, the Potawatomi passed through West Quincy, Palmyra, Paris, Moberly, Huntsville, Salisbury, Keatsville (Keytesville), Brunswick, De Witt, Carrollton, and Richmond, Missouri. At Lexington they crossed the Missouri River and continued on to Wellington, Napoleon, near Buckner and Lake City, Independence, and Grandview.

On November 2, the group crossed the north fork of the Blue River into Kansas and camped at Oak Grove, which was probably renamed Elm Grove. On November 3, they reached Bull Creek, near Bulltown (which became Paola, Kansas). The group reached the end of the journey, on the western bank of the Osage River, at Osawatomie, Kansas, on November 4, 1838. After having traveled 660 miles (1,060 km) the Potawatomi were placed under the supervision of the local Indian agent and Reverend Christian Hoecken. Of the 859 who began the journey, 756 Potawatomi survived; 42 were recorded as having died; the remainder escaped.

Judge Polke and the soldiers who accompanied the Potawatomi to Kansas began the return trip to Indiana on November 7–8, 1838. Father Petit was severely weakened from the arduous journey, and began his return trip to Indiana on January 2, 1839. Too ill to continue his trip home, he died at St. Louis, Missouri, on February 10, 1839, at the age of 27.

The Potawatomi of the Woods, or Mission Band, remained in eastern Kansas for ten years. In March 1839, they moved about 20 miles (32 km) south to Sugar Creek mission in Linn County, Kansas. In 1840 more Potawatomi from Indiana arrived to settle on the Kansas reservation. The following year, on April 15, 1841, Chief Menominee died and was buried in Kansas; he never returned to Indiana. In 1848 the Potawatomi moved further west to St. Marys, Kansas, 140 miles (230 km) northwest of Sugar Creek, where they remained until the Civil War. In 1861, the Potawatomi of the Woods Mission Band were offered a new treaty which gave them land in Oklahoma. Those who signed this treaty became Citizen Band Potawatomi, because they were given U.S. citizenship. Their headquarters is at Shawnee, Oklahoma. After the Civil War, the Potawatomi scattered; many of them moved to other reservations in Kansas and Oklahoma. A reservation for the Prairie Band Potawatomi is located at Mayetta, Kansas. The state of Kansas named Pottawatomie County, Kansas, in honor of the tribe.

Not all the Potawatomi from Indiana removed to the western United States. Some remained in the East, and others fled to Michigan, where they became part of the Huron and Pokagon Potawatomi bands. A small group joined an estimated 2500 Potawatomi in Canada.

== Route details ==
Numerous groups have placed commemorative markers along the route in tribute to those who marched to Kansas and as a memorial to those who died along the way. In 1994, the Trail of Death was declared a Regional Historic Trail by the state legislatures of Indiana, Illinois, and Kansas; Missouri passed similar legislation in 1996. As of 2003, the Trail of Death had 74 markers along the route.

=== Indiana ===
At Twin Lakes, the march began on September 4, 1838, from Menominee's village. In 1909, a statue of Chief Menominee was erected near Twin Lakes, on South Peach Road, 5 miles (8.0 km) west of US 31. It is the first statue to a Native American erected under a state or federal legislative enactment. Dedicated in 1909, boulder with a metal plaque marks the site of the Potawatomi's log chapel and village at Twin Lakes.

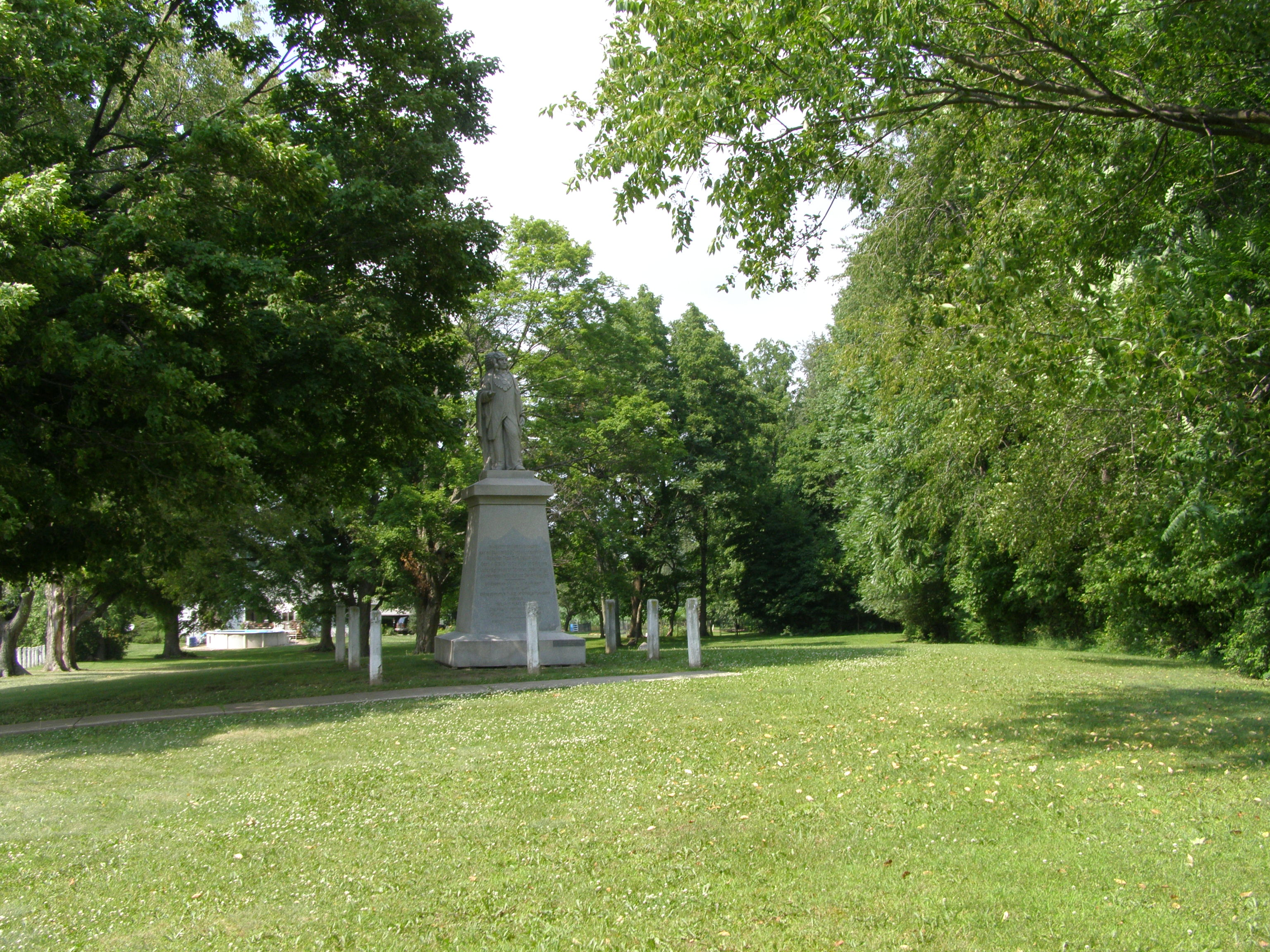
Memorial to Chief Menominee

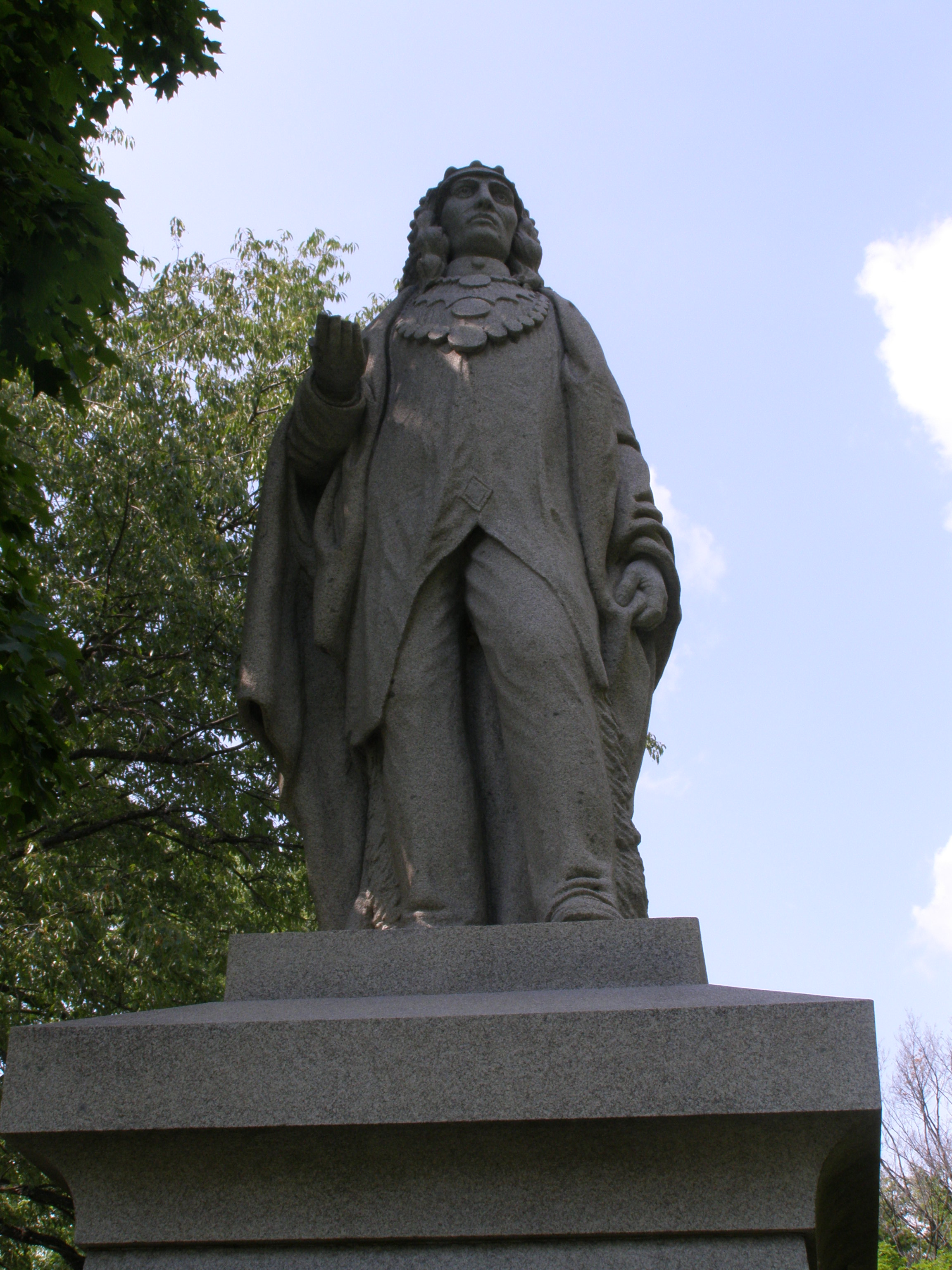
Chief Menominee

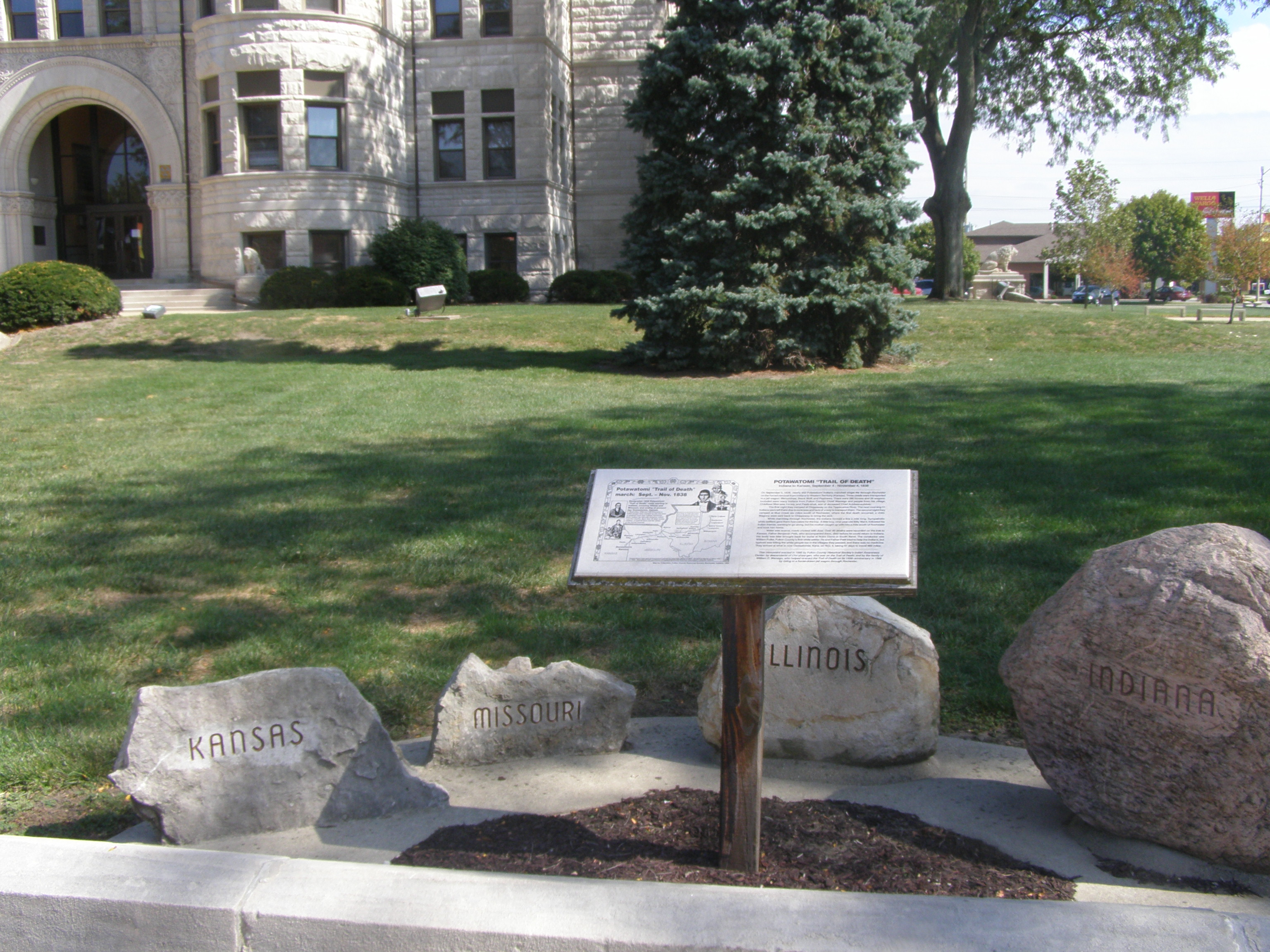
Potawatomi Trail of Death historic marker in front of the Fulton County Courthouse in Rochester, Indiana.

2 miles (3.2 km) north of Rochester, on September 4, 1838, the Potawatomi passed through Chippeway village on the Tippecanoe River, on the Michigan Road (Old US 31). About 50 who were severely ill were left here with their attendants; most joined the caravan later, but some escaped. On September 5, they marched down Rochester's Main Street, and camped at Mud Creek, north of Fulton. Historical markers include a boulder with metal plaque, erected in 1922 by Manitou Chapter of the Daughters of American Revolution; and a memorial to Father Benjamin Petit, erected at the Fulton County Museum in Rochester.

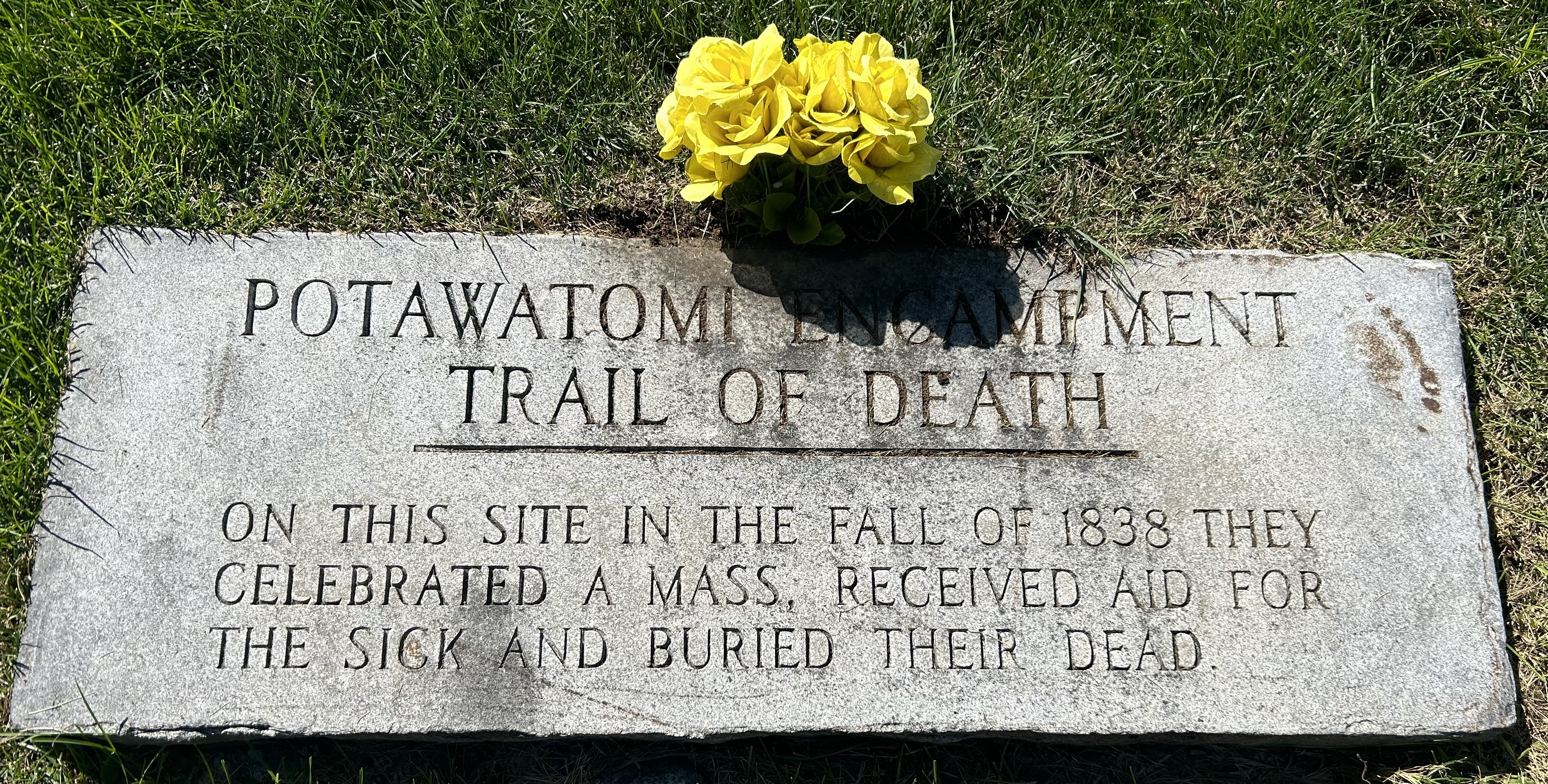
A Potawatomi encampment marker is in Logansport, Indiana.

0.5 miles (0.80 km) from Logansport, from September 6–9, the group camped at Horney Creek. Some of those who were left at Chippeway village on September 4 had recovered enough to return to the group; however, four children died between September 5–9. Bishop Brute and Father Petit said Mass on Sunday. Local physicians tending the group set up a field hospital and reported that 300 were ill. A historical marker for Potawatomi encampment near Logansport was erected on grounds of Logansport Memorial Hospital, State Road 25, at the north edge of town by the Cass County Historical Society in 1988.

Near Delphi, historical markers in Carroll County, Indiana, mark the route. Old Winnemac's village on Towpath Road in rural Carroll County was the campsite for September 10, 1838. A wooden sign erected in 1988 by the Carroll County Historical Society near the route of the march northeast of Delphi, near the intersection of County Roads 800 West and 700 North, as a commemoration "of the Trail of Death removal of Potawatomi and Miami Indians". A metal sign on Pleasant Run, north of Pittsburg, Indiana, near the intersection of County Roads 800 West and 550 North, was erected by Boy Scout Kris Cannon, Troop 144, in 1996.

West of Battle Ground, the group encamped on September 12. A plaque and map on a boulder at the Tippecanoe Battlefield Museum was placed by Girl Scout Troop 219 in 1996. A plaque attached to a boulder along the north side of County Road 500 North, between Morehouse Road and County Road 225 West, just west of the Mt. Zion Church. It was placed by the Tippecanoe County Historical Association in 1998.

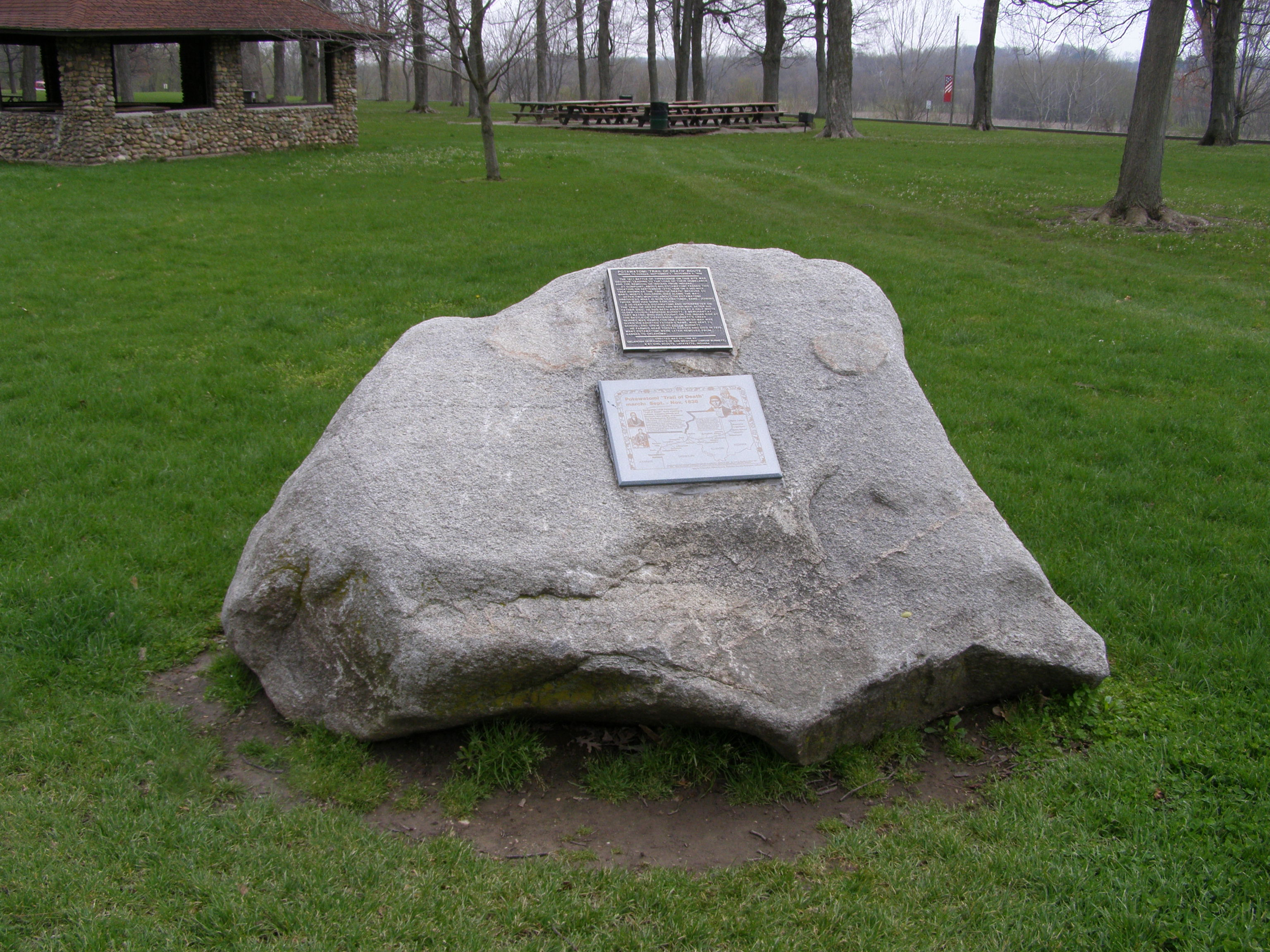

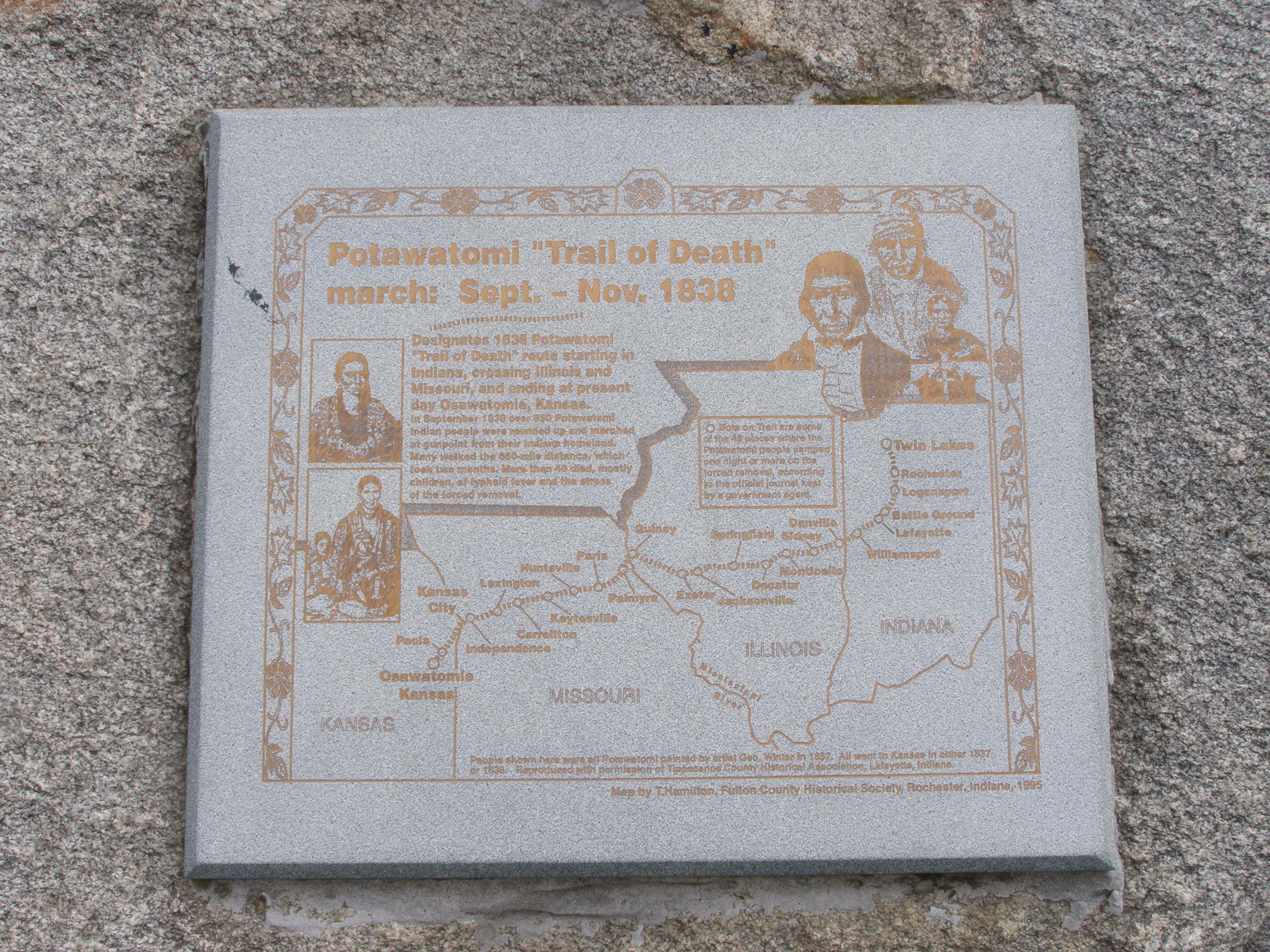

Past Lafayette, the caravan traveled west and encamped near LaGrange on September 13, 1838. A metal plaque attached to a boulder marks the campsite at LaGrange, a village that no longer exists, along the Wabash River at the Tippecanoe-Warren county line. It was placed by Girl Scout Kristy Young of Monon, Indiana.

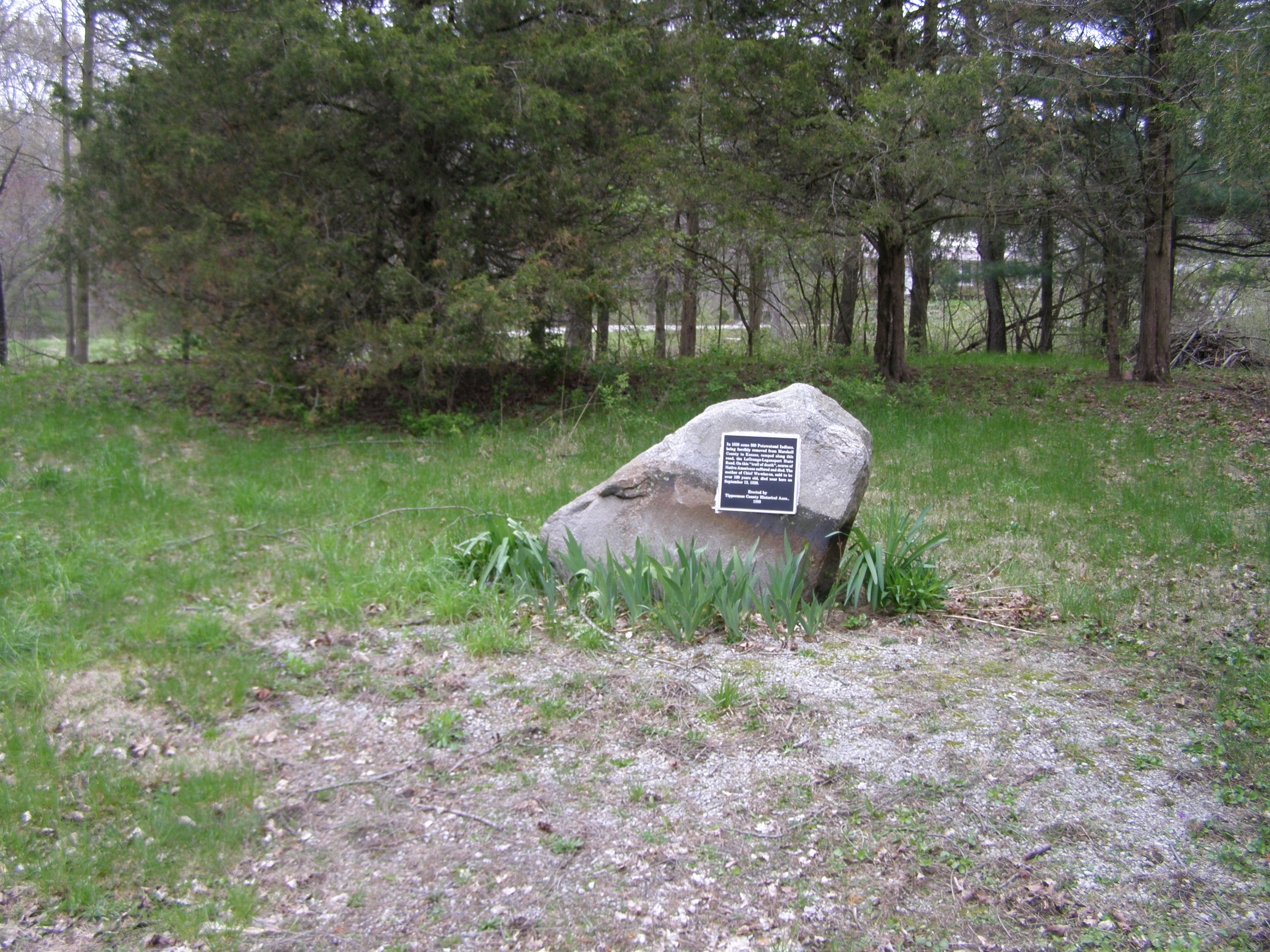
Marker on 500 N, NW of West Lafayette

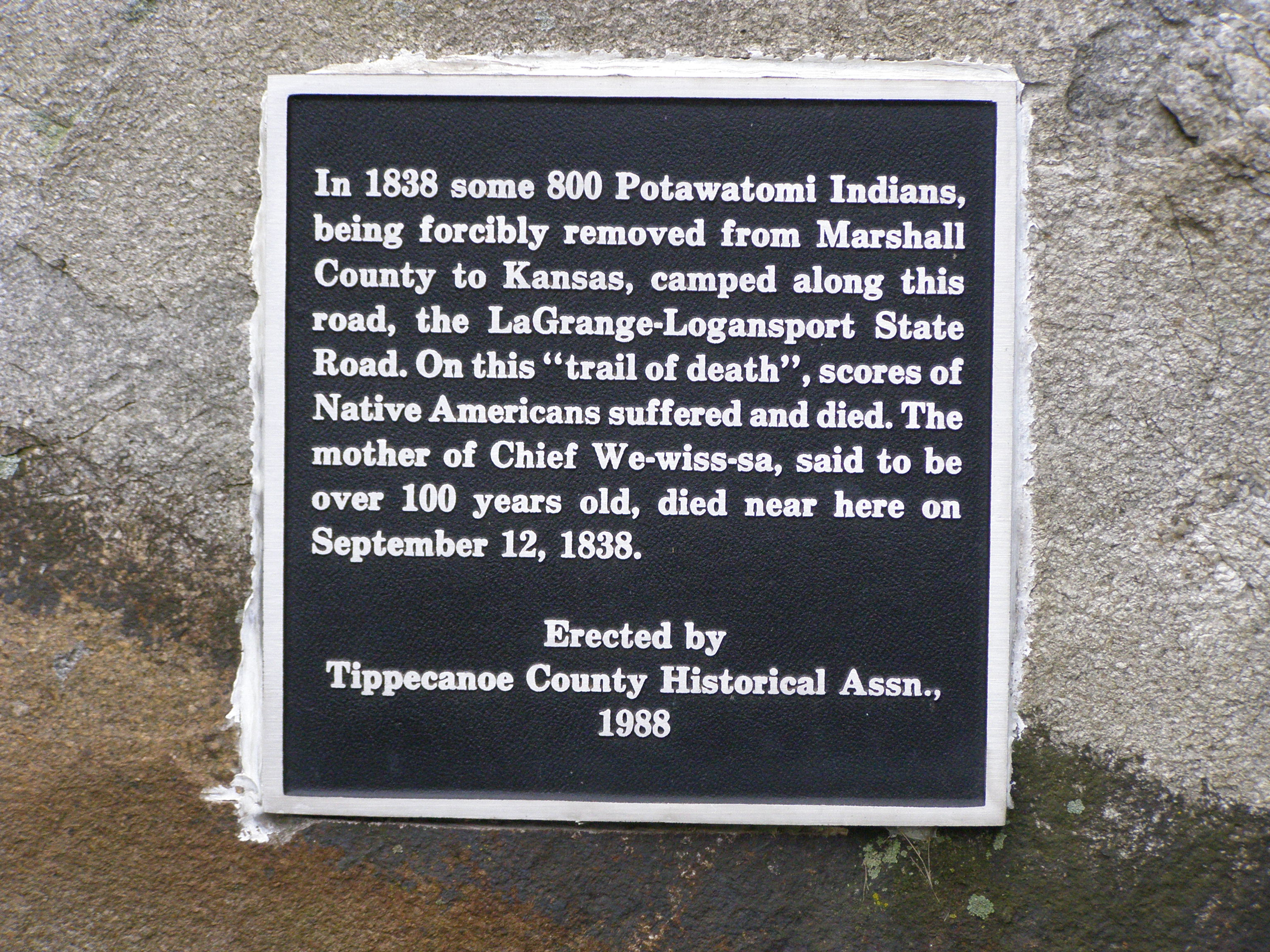

North of Independence is a marker at Zachariah Cicott Park, commemorating passage through the area. The marker was sponsored by John Henry and Warren County Park board in 1993.

Near Williamsport, they camped on September 14, 1838; on September 15, their encampment was along a stream, near the Indiana-Illinois state line. The caravan did not cross the Wabash River; it zigzagged across Warren County, Indiana. A metal sign at Old Town Park, on Main and Old 2nd streets, was placed in 1996 by Phil High and Boy Scout Troop 344. A marker at Gopher Hill Cemetery, near the Gopher Hill encampment of 1838, in Warren County, Indiana, is 2.5 miles (4.0 km) southeast of the Indiana-Illinois state line.

=== Illinois ===
Near Danville, on Sunday, September 16, 1838, at their camp near Indiana-Illinois state line, the Indians were allowed to go hunting. Two small children died along the road. "The heat along with the dust is daily rendering our marches more distressing." A marker was placed in Ellsworth Park.

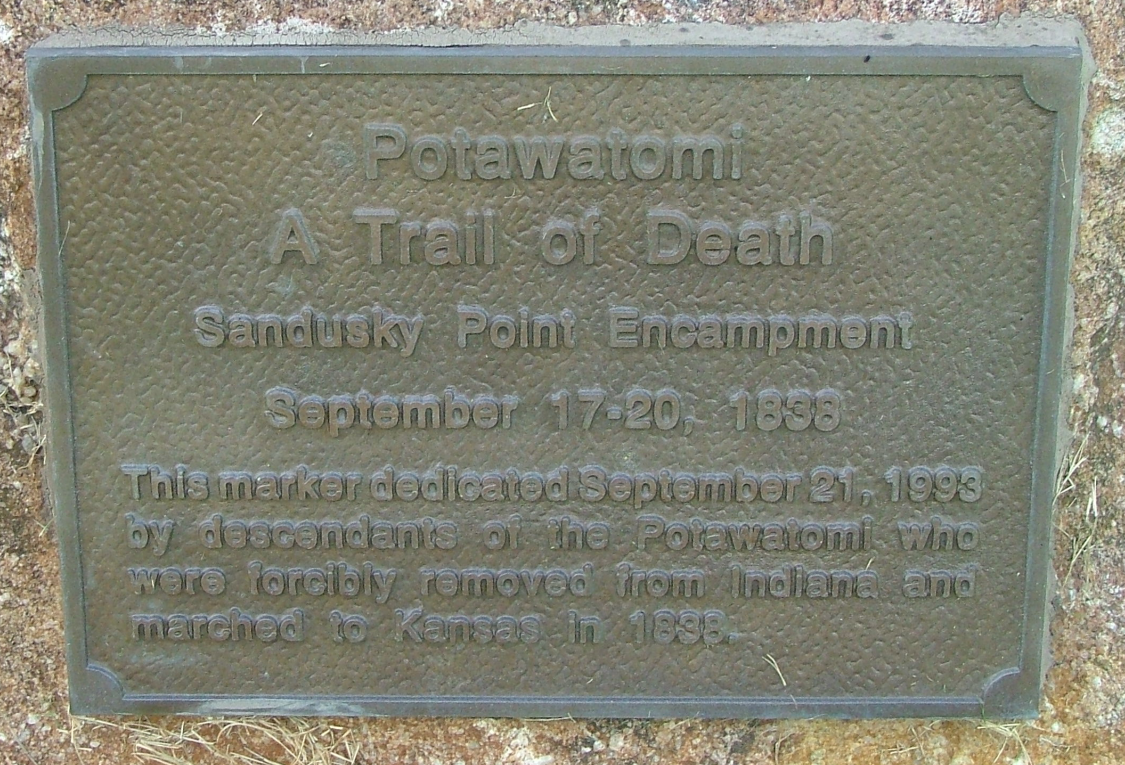
A Trail of Death marker is in Catlin, Illinois.

Catlin was named Sandusky Point in 1838. On September 17, the group traveled 6 miles (9.7 km) to reach Sandusky Point, where they camped until September 20. A marker on the grounds of the Catlin Historical Museum at Catlin, Illinois, southwest of Danville, was sponsored by Paul Quick, the Society of Indian Lore, and a local Boy Scout troop. It was erected in 1993. A bronze marker on North Paris Street in Catlin was erected in 1993 by the descendants of the Potawatomi. A marker at Davis Point, near Homer, Illinois, commemorates the campsite of September 20, 1838. Boy Scout Andy Chase erected the marker in 1991, 3.6 miles (5.8 km) east of Homer.

In Sidney, Illinois, on September 21, 1838, Chief Muk-kose and a child died. On September 22, 1838, further west at the Sadorus Grove encampment, three men were jailed for drunkenness. Two Potawatomi were put under armed guard; the other man, a wagoner, was discharged from his duties. A plaque embedded in a boulder in Dunlop Woods Park was erected in 1991 by Boy Scout Any Chase to commemorate the Sidney camp. A plaque embedded in a boulder in Lions Club Park was erected by Boy Scout John Housman in 1993, marking the Sadorus's Grove campsite of September 22, 1838.

Monticello was named Pyatt's Point in 1838. After marching 15 miles (24 km) the Potawatomi reached the Sangamon River, near Pyatt's Point, on Sunday, September 23. A child had died that morning, and 29 persons were left in camps being too sick to travel. The group camped along the Sangamon River on September 24 and 25, where two more children and one adult died. The sick who had been left behind to recover rejoined the group. The men were allowed to go hunting for food. A trail marker was placed at the corner of Dunbar and Caleb roads in Monticello by Boy Scout Ryan Berg in 1993. A marker on private property on Center Street in Monticello was placed by Boy Scout Daniel Valentine in 1988. A trail marker at Monticello's old City Cemetery on Railroad Street was placed by Boy Scout David Moody in 1998.

In Decatur, on Wednesday, September 26, one journal entry remarked: "We have reason to believe that the health of the camp is returning. The weather still continues delightful—the roads, however, are again becoming dusty....A child died after dark." A historical marker named The Rock was placed in Mueller Park on Lake Shore Drive in 1994 by Zita and Bernard Wright.

At Niantic or Long Point, about 14 miles (23 km) from their campsite near Decatur, the encampment provided more opportunities for the Indians to hunt game. Water was also more plentiful. "Their success has been such as to supersede entirely the necessity of issuing rations. The camp is now full of venison." A marker in the town park, by a water tower, was erected in 2000 by Boy Scout Griffin Smith, and sponsored by the Gerald and Tom Wesaw families, Pokagon Potawatomi.

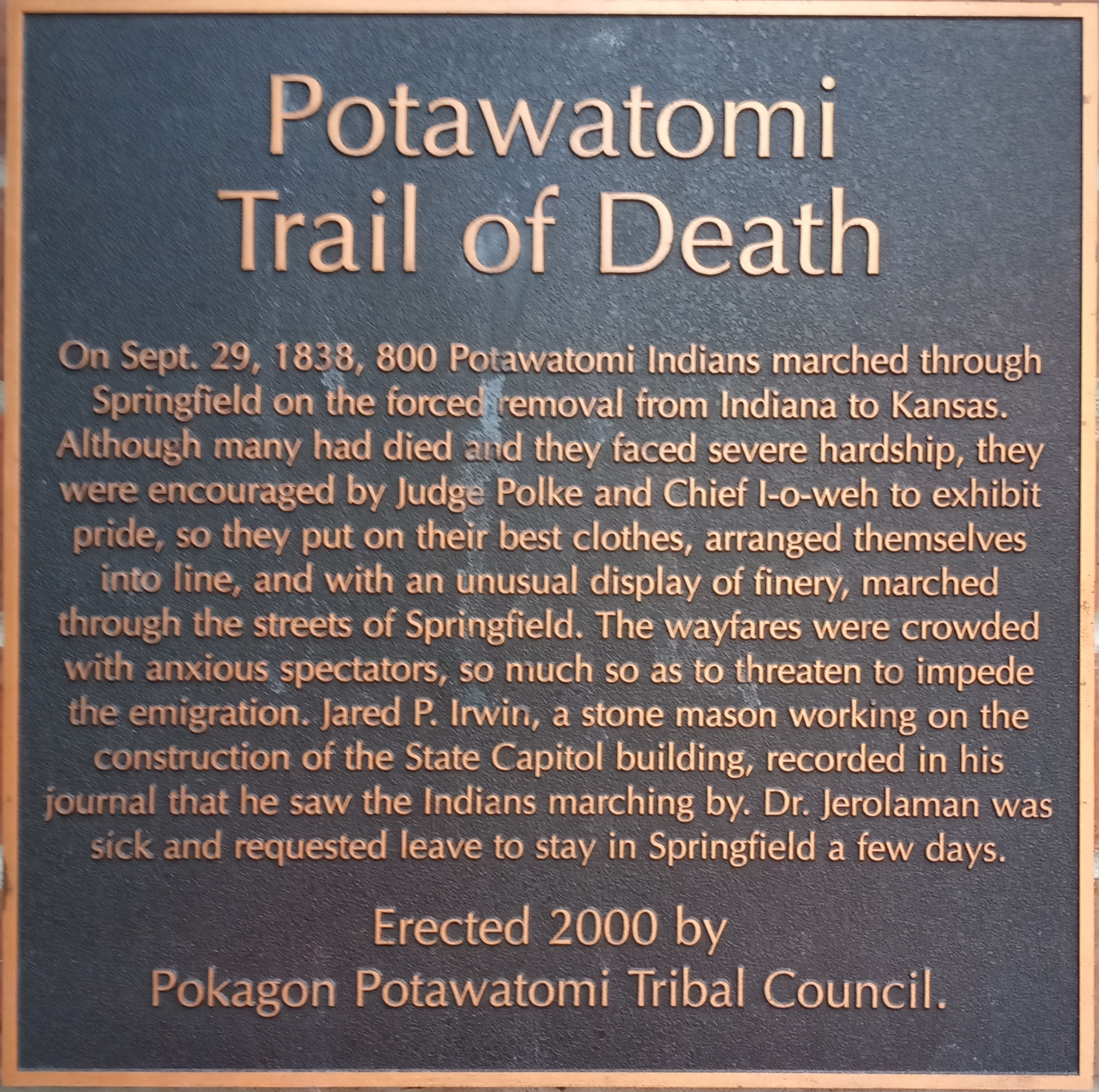
A plaque was placed by the Pokagon Band of Potawatomi near Springfield's Old State Capitol.

At Springfield, the Potawatomi men were promised tobacco if they made a good appearance while passing through. Chief Ioway (I-o-weh) took charge of making everyone presentable. They were able to find plenty of food this day by foraging through the countryside, but two children died overnight. A marker on Oak Crest Road, at the golf course, was erected by Springfield chapter of Daughters of the American Revolution in 1995. A metal plaque placed at Old State Capitol Plaza on side of building leading to the parking garage was placed by Pokagon Potawatomi in 2001.

At New Berlin, a marker at Old Jacksonville Road and New Salem Church Road marks the McCoy's Mill encampment. The marker was erected in 1995 by Rainbow Dancers, Pow Wow Committee, and Clayville Folk Arts Guild. A marker at Old Jacksonville Road, near Peters Road (Island Grove Methodist Church/Woodwreath Cemetery), identifies the Island Grove encampment, where a child died a few hours after making camp and is buried near this spot. The marker was erected in 1995 by Rainbow Dancers, Pow Wow Committee, and the Clayville Folk Arts Guild.

At Jacksonville, Illinois, on Monday, October 1, 1838, a child fell from a wagon and was crushed under the wheels. It was believed that the child would probably die. Late at night the camp was serenaded by the Jacksonville Band. On Tuesday, October 2, they marched into Jacksonville's town square, escorted by the town's band. Local citizens presented them with tobacco and pipes. A marker in Foreman Grove Park, East College Avenue and Johnson Street, was erected in 2001 by Native American Fellowship Council and Bill Norval of Peoria, Illinois, and the Morgan County Historical Society. A marker in the town square was erected 1993 by Morgan County Historical Society.

At Exeter, on October 2, 1838, they camped about 16 miles (26 km) from Jacksonville. A marker in the town park was dedicated in 1993 by Mayor Roger Lovelace and the people of Exeter.

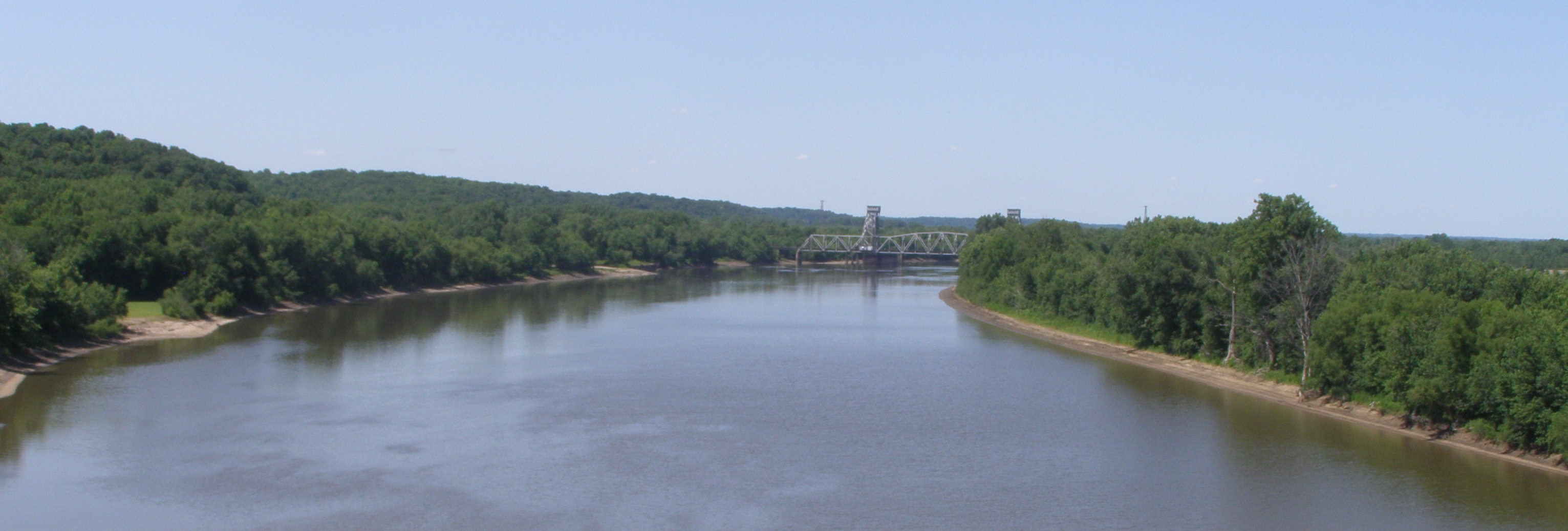
Illinois River at I-72 and U.S. 36. Five miles north at Naples, Illinois, the Potawatomi Trail of Death caravan crossed the Illinois River by ferry.

At Naples, from Wednesday, October 3, to Thursday, October 4, the caravan spent 9 hours ferrying the Illinois River on keelboats and flatboats. The Potawatomi also had time to wash clothing and blankets, make moccasins, "and do many other things necessary to their comfort and cleanliness". Two children died while they were encamped opposite the river from Naples, Illinois.

Near Quincy, Illinois, they camped for three days from October 8–10, where they crossed the Mississippi River on a steam-powered ferry to Missouri. During this time, three children died. From then, the Potawatomi were permitted to remain in camp on Sunday for devotional services. While in Quincy, they attended Mass at St. Boniface Catholic Church. A marker at Liberty Park, in Liberty, Illinois, commemorates the encampment at Mill Creek. The marker was dedicated on September 26, 1998. A marker was dedicated in Quincy's Quinsippi Island Park on September 15, 2003.

=== Missouri ===
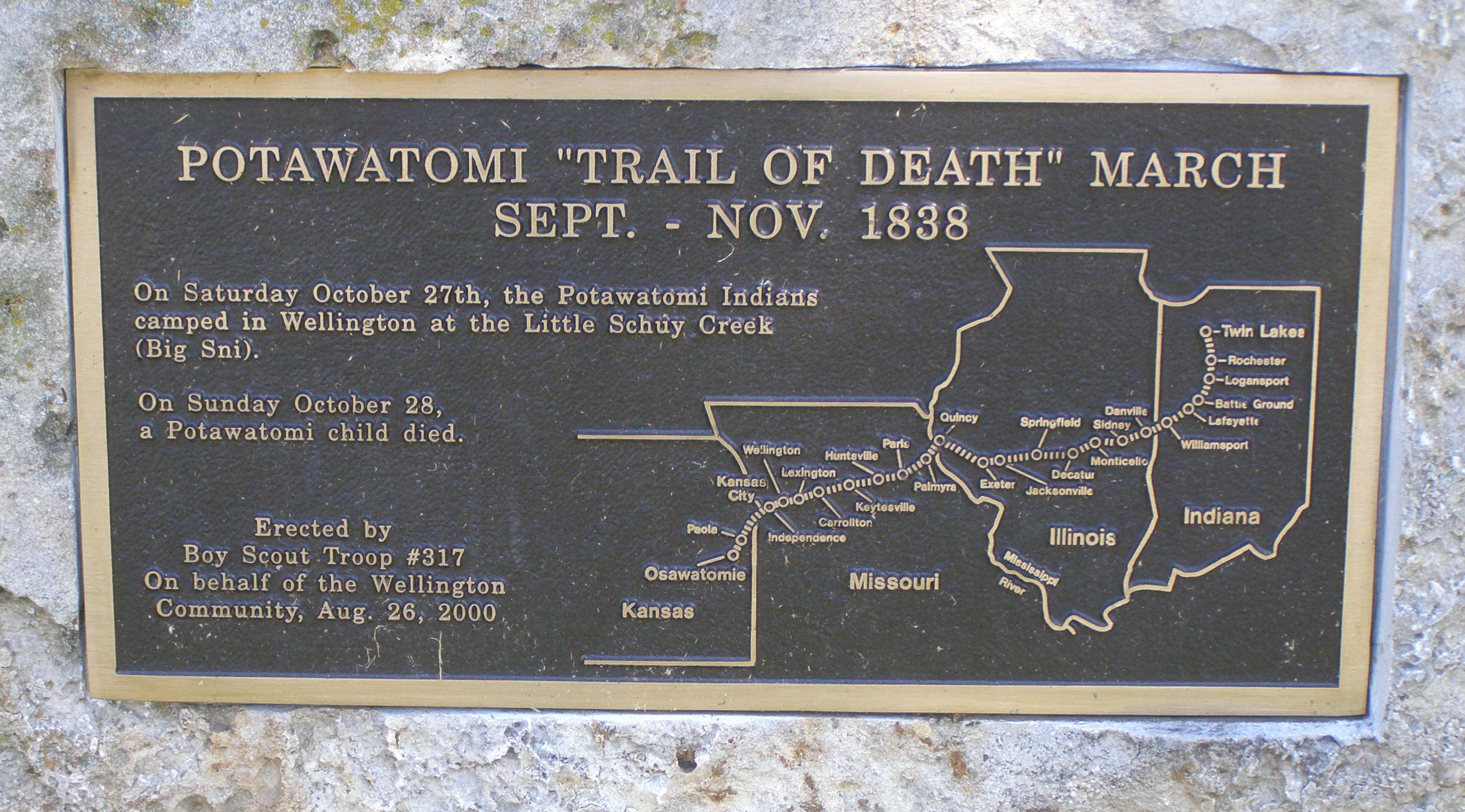
A plaque is at Fifth Street or Missouri 224. Along the Missouri River in Wellington, Missouri is the route.

Approximately 11 miles (18 km) from Palmyra, the group camped at See's Creek from Friday, October 12, through Sunday, October 14, 1838. A marker was placed on the property of the Mount Vernon Methodist Church, near the encampment site.

At Paris, the caravan encamped on October 15, 1838, and the next day traveled to Barkhart's encampment, about 18 miles (29 km) away. A marker is in the courtyard of the Monroe County Courthouse at Huntsville.

Near Huntsville, a marker at Salisbury City Park was dedicated in 1998.

In Keytesville, a marker at Sterling Price Park was dedicated in 1993. A marker at Keytesville commemorates the Thomas encampment near De Witt (Carroll County, Missouri). It was placed at the Carroll County Historical Society Museum and dedicated on September 28, 1998.

The group passed Carrollton and Lexington. A marker was placed next to the Madonna of the Trail statue in 2000 by the local Boy Scout troop, in memory of Ka-Beam-Sa.

In Wellington, a marker was placed in the town square by the local Boy Scout troop in 2000, in memory of Ka-Beam-Sa.

In Napoleon, a marker was placed in the town park, noting that the Potawatomi had camped east of town at Fire Prairie Creek.

In Independence, a trail marker in Pioneer Spring Park was erected by Boy Scout Matt Moreno in 1993.

The group passed Grandview.

=== Kansas ===
The group passed Paola. A marker to commemorate the Oak Grove encampment, near the Kansas-Missouri state line, was placed at State Line Road and 215th Street, east of Stilwell.

The group passed Osawatomie. A marker in honor of Father Benjamin Petit at St. Philippine Duchesne Park, the site of the Potawatomi's Sugar Creek Mission, includes boulders from Kansas and Missouri and a route map. The memorial was dedicated on September 28, 2003.

== See also ==
- Citizen Potawatomi Nation
- Indian removals in Indiana
- Pottawatomie County, Kansas
