= George Winter (artist) =

British-American painter

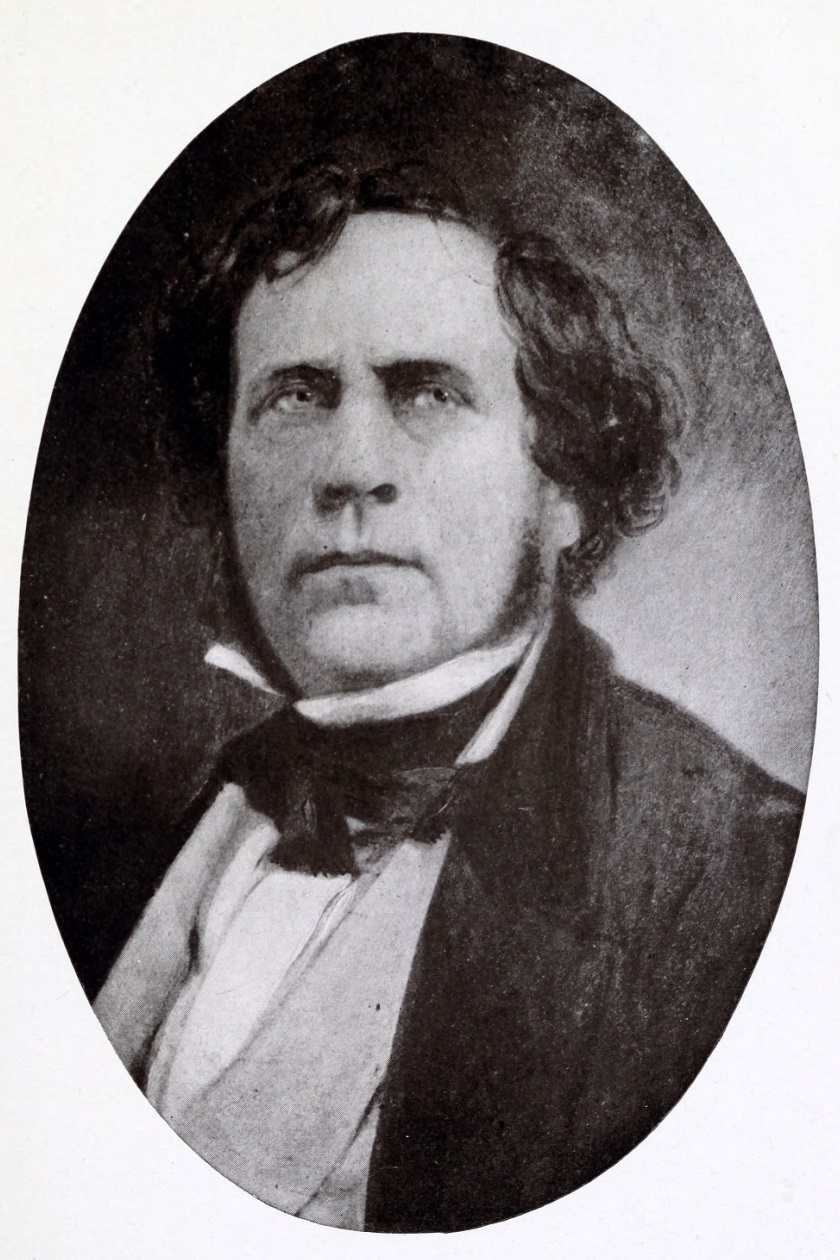
- George Winter
- Born: June 10, 1810; Portsea, Portsmouth, Hampshire, England
- Died: February 1, 1876 (aged 65); Lafayette, Indiana
- Known for: Painting
- Spouse(s): Mary Jane Squier (1820–1899), married August 5, 1840

George Winter (June 10, 1809 – February 1, 1876) was an English-born landscape and portrait artist who immigrated to the United States in 1830 and became an American citizen in northern Indiana's Wabash River valley. Winter was one of Indiana's first professional artists. In addition, he is considered the state's most significant painter of the first half of the nineteenth century. Winter is especially noted for his sketches, watercolors, and oil portraits that provide a visual record of the Potawatomi and Miami people in northern Indiana from 1837 to the 1840s, as well as other figures drawn from his firsthand observations on the American frontier.

Winter is better known for the historic value and subject matter of his work, rather than his artistic skill and mastery of technique. Not well known outside of Indiana during his lifetime, Winter gained notice with his portrait of Frances Slocum, a Quaker who was abducted in Pennsylvania by Delaware (Lenape) warriors when she was a child and grew up to become the wife of a Miami chief in Indiana. The Slocum portrait, along with his other work, has appeared in several publications and art exhibitions. Winter's art and other materials are represented in public collections in Indiana (Haan Mansion Museum of Indiana Art), Wisconsin, and Pennsylvania.

== Early life and education ==
Winter, the youngest of twelve children, was born on June 10, 1809, in Portsea, Portsmouth, England. As part of "a cultured family," Winter grew up "in an art atmosphere from early childhood." His early education took place in the local schools, but he also received private instruction and planned to continue art studies in London. When Winter's father and five of his siblings immigrated to the United States, Winter and other members of the family remained in England. In 1826 Winter moved to London, where he lived with his brother, John, and spent the next four years painting reproductions of art exhibited in the city's museum and galleries. Winter may have tried to gain admission to the Royal Academy of Arts in London, but it appears that he never formally trained as a painter.

In June 1830 winter immigrated the United States at the age of twenty-one. He exhibited one of his reproductions of J. P. Loutherbourg's Battle of Ascalon at the American Institute of the City of New York in October 1830, but studied art at the National Academy of Design in New York City. Winter also exhibited his early work at the National Academy's annual art exhibitions in 1832, 1834, and 1835. He moved to Cincinnati, Ohio, where his parents and other members of his family resided, in 1835. Winter opened an art studio, but found it difficult to make a living in Cincinnati as a portrait artist and illustrator. He closed the studio in 1837.

In May 1837 Winter decided to visit Logansport, Indiana. He had heard about the federal government's investigations of "irregularities" among Indian traders and the Potatawatomis, as well as the government's efforts to speed up the removal of the Potawatomi tribe from northern Indiana to reservation land in the Kansas Territory. Winter planned to observe and make sketches the Potawatomis during the legal proceedings. Although he only intended to make a brief stay before returning to the eastern United States, Winter remained at Logansport until 1850.

== Marriage and family ==
Winter married Mary Jane Squier, the daughter of Timothy and Rebekah Tucker Squier, on August 5, 1840, at Miamisburg, Ohio. Her father was a proprietor of stagecoach lines at Dayton, Ohio. Winter applied for U.S. citizenship in July 1841 and became a naturalized citizen. Winter and his wife established a home in Logansport. Their son, George Jr., was born on June 22, 1841; a daughter, Annette, was born on January 6, 1844. A second daughter, Agnes, died on July 24, 1850, at the age of seventeen months.

== Career ==
=== Early years at Logansport ===
From 1837 to the late 1840s Winters observed the Potawatomi and Miami people on the northern Indiana frontier and kept detailed notes of his experiences in the field. Winter relocated to Logansport, Indiana, in May 1837 and observing and sketching the Potawatomis living in the surrounding area and documenting their culture. Winter observed the Potawatomis during the court proceedings investigating federal payments made to the Potawatomis prior to their removal west of the Mississippi River. In addition to documenting his sketches and paintings, Winter kept a journal and made notes about the subjects of his work, as well as other details of his encounters with Native Americans and others. Winter also painted portraits of the Potawatomis at a studio he established near a local trading post.

During the summer of 1837 Winter accompanied government representatives to a council meeting with the Potawatomis at Lake Kee-wau-nay (Indiana's present-day Lake Bruce), where the government officials hoped to persuade the Potawatomis to emigrate to Kansas Territory. Winter made more than seventy sketches as he observed the proceedings at the lake. In August 1837 Winter visited Crooked Creek, Indiana, the site of a Potawatomi removal camp. In November 1837 he was present when the final annuity payment was made to the Potawatomis in northern Indiana at Demoss' Tavern.

In 1838 Winter witnessed the beginning of the forced march of the Potawatomis to Kansas Territory and sketched the exodus as they passed through Logansport. The long march would later be called the Potawatomi Trail of Death. Instead of continuing his observations of Native Americans after their removal to the western United States, Winter remained at Logansport to paint portraits of local residents. He also wrote a series of published articles that appeared in the Logansport Telegraph, possibly to supplement his income as an artist. In 1839 Winter was commissioned to paint a portrait of Frances Slocum, the "Lost Sister of Wyoming," at her home near Peru, Indiana. Slocum was the subject of his most valuable and best-known work.

In connection with William Henry Harrison's presidential campaign in 1840 and subsequent election, Winter spent a week sketching the site of the Tippecanoe (1811), where Harrison earned his reputation as a military hero. Winter hoped to make a financial profit from exhibiting and selling six large canvases he had painted from the battleground sketches he had made. In a private letter Winter noted that two of them had dimensions of 152 square feet (14.1 m^{2}) each. He also described the collection as being taken from different points of view to convey the idea of the battleground and the "surrounding romantic country." The large size of the paintings suggests that they were intended for public display, but Winter's efforts to make a profit from them ultimately failed. Later, they were seized by Winter's creditors. The Indiana state government acquired one of the paintings in 1849, but it has not survived. The fate of the other five paintings is unknown.

Although Winter exhibited two paintings at the Cincinnati Academy in 1841, and joined the city's Western Art Union, organized in 1847, he made few sales and struggled to make a living as a painter in Logansport. After some of Winter's possessions were seized to cover a portion of his debts, the family temporarily resided with Mary's father, Timothy Squier, who had retired to New Carlisle, Ohio. Winter and his family recovered from their financial difficulties and returned to Logansport in 1845.

=== Move to Lafayette ===
Hoping to find more clients for his work, Winter opened a studio in Lafayette, Indiana, in 1850. His family remained at Logansport until 1852, then moved into a home on Lafayette's Main Street. Except for occasional travel and a brief residence in California in 1875–76, Winter lived in Lafayette from 1850 until his death in 1876.

To earn additional income in the early 1850s, Winter presented a traveling "mixed media" show called "Elydoric Paintings and Dissolving Views." It opened in Lafayette in November 1851 and appeared in several other Indiana cities, such as Indianapolis, Crawfordsville, and Marion. The show included four large canvases that Winter painted of classical and modern European scenes. After the show closed in October 1852, he returned to painting.

During the period 1852–58, Winter earned money to support his family by raffling off his paintings, usually at $2 per ticket, at various locations in Indiana, Iowa, and Ohio. Winter also visited Wisconsin in 1856, and opened a studio at Burlington, Iowa, but Lafayette, Indiana, remained the main location for the distribution of his work. Winter's largest raffle took place in Lafayette in 1868; the last of his raffles took place in 1873. It has been estimated than more than 500 of Winter's paintings were distributed in this manner over a twenty-two year period. To create the large volume of art for the raffles, Winter reworked his older material, made reproductions from prints and other works of art, and produced new portraits, landscapes, and genre scenes from sketches he made in the field. Although the scenes were based on his observations, Winter also modified his paintings to include "touches of fancy."

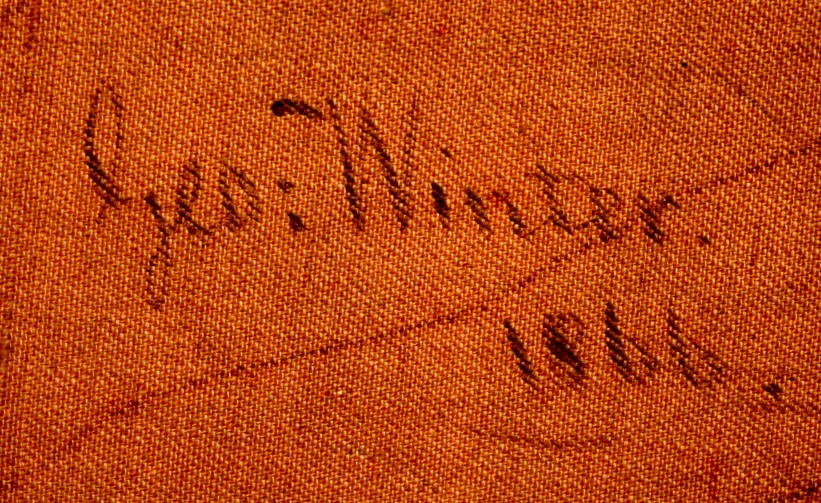
George Winter's signature on the back of an oil painting canvas.

== Later years ==
When his brother, Charles, died in San Francisco, California, in 1874, Winter traveled west to settle the estate and inherited his brother's California home. George returned to Indiana in 1875 and brought his wife, Mary, to Oakland, California, where they stayed for more than a year. During his brief residency in California, Winter became a member of the San Francisco Art Association and exhibited ten works of art at its exhibition in 1875.

Winter and his wife returned to Lafayette on January 26, 1876. He died unexpectedly of apoplexy on February 1, 1876, while attending a meeting of railroad stockholders at Snyder's Opera House in Lafayette. Following funeral services at Lafayette's Saint John's Church, he was buried in the city's Greenbush Cemetery.

== Legacy ==
Indiana's art historians consider Winter as the "most significant of Indiana's pioneer painters" in the first half of the nineteenth century and the state's "principal landscape painter of the period." He is also one of the state's first professional artists, although the work of Charles Alexandre Lesueur predates Winter's artistic work on the Indiana frontier and Jacob Cox of Indianapolis was one of his contemporaries.

Despite Winter's fame in northern Indiana's Wabash River valley, where he lived for nearly forty years, he was not well known outside of Indiana during his lifetime. By 1900 Winter and his work had fallen into obscurity. Two of Winter's works that achieved modest success during his lifetime were Spotted Faun and his version of The Indian Captive. Winter's best-known work was his painting of Francis Slocum. Winter and the painting received increased attention after John F. Meginness's biography of Francis Slocum was published fifteen years after Winter's death.

Winter and his most noteworthy and valuable works remained largely unknown until the 1930s and 1940s, when the largest single collection of Winter's art and documentary materials that he had never sold were rediscovered by his descendants. In 1986 Evelyn Osterman Ball of Lafayette, the widow of Winter's great-grandson, Cable Gordon Ball, donated the extensive collection to the Tippecanoe County Historical Association in Lafayette. In addition to Winter's paintings and sketches, the Association's George Winter Collection includes a large manuscript collection of Winter's notes, papers, correspondence, and other materials related to his life. The collection has important historic value due to its detailed descriptions of Winter's firsthand accounts of the Potawatomi and Miami tribes in northern Indiana during the mid-nineteenth century.

Winter's sketches and the subsequent portraits he painted remain the best visual record of the Potawatomi and Miami tribes in northern Indiana during the 1830s and 1840s. He notable for his efforts to document their daily lives from his firsthand observations in the field. Winter's work in documenting the Potawatomi and Miami people in Indiana is unique. Other noted artists such as George Catlin and Paul Kane depicted these tribes in other regions of the country or at a later date, following their removal west of the Mississippi River. Winter's oil paintings and watercolors depicted the likenesses of Francis Godfroy, the last war chief of the Miamis, Native American interpreter Joseph Barron, and Frances Slocum, among many others. He also documented the daily lives of the Miami and Potawatomi people, as well as the beginning of the Trail of Death, the forced removal of the Potawatomis to the Kansas Territory in 1839. It is for these reasons, rather than his artistic skill, that Winter's work remains "an important primary source for the still largely unwritten historical ethnography of the Potawatomis and Miamis."

Winter was not known for his mastery of technique. Some art critics have identified shortcomings in his portraits, especially regarding the use of color, handling of paint, and "minor" anatomical accuracies. Critics also consider Winter as a minor figure on the national art scene, with a technical ability in the middle range of his contemporaries who did similar work. Some critics have also pointed out that Winter's art lacked the romantic interpretation of Native Americans who retained their own culture, which was a more popular style that appeared in the work of other artists.

Winter's fame as an Indiana artist increased in the twentieth century after he was included in Mary Burnet's Art and Artists of Indiana (1921), an early work on the subject. The publication of The Journals and Indian Paintings of George Winter, 1837–1839 (1948), a compilation Winter's journals and manuscripts, and a subsequent series of public exhibitions in Indiana, also helped increase public awareness of his work. A portion of the Tippecanoe County Historical Association's George Winter Collection is available online through a cooperative project of the Association and the Purdue University Libraries Archives and Special Collections.

== Selected works ==
=== Portrait of Frances Slocum ===
Although Winter's drawings of the Miamis at Deaf Man's village filled one of his portfolios (Miamis of the Mississinewa), he is best known for his portrait and documentation of the life of Frances Slocum, a Quaker child who became known as Maconaqua among the Miamis. Delaware (Lenape) warriors had abducted Slocum from her home in the Wyoming valley, near present-day Wilkes-Barre, Pennsylvania, in 1778, when she was five years old. Slocum grew up among the Delawares and Miamis, and became the wife of Deaf Man, a Miami chief.

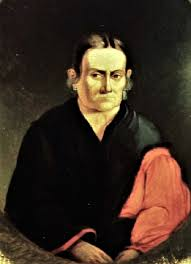
Frances Slocum portrait by George Winter, 1839

Slocum had feared that she would be removed from her Miami family if her origins became known, but decided to relate her story to Colonel George W. Ewing, a local trader who had come to Deaf Man's village in 1839. When some of Slocum's siblings from Pennsylvania visited her in Indiana later that year, her eldest brother commissioned Winter to paint her portrait so that he could take it home to Pennsylvania to show other members of the family. Slocum was an elderly woman when Winter painted her portrait in 1839. She remained with the Miamis in Indiana until her death in 1847.

=== Oil portraits ===
- Portrait of Frances Slocum, 1839, oil, Tippecanoe County Historical Association
- Portrait of Albert Cole, c. 1840, oil on canvas, Indianapolis Museum of Art
- Portrait of Mary Galpin Cole, c. 1840, oil on canvas, Indianapolis Museum of Art

=== Oil landscapes ===
- Landscape near Lafayette, 1850–1876, oil on canvas, Indianapolis Museum of Art
- Landscape with Indians, oil on canvas, Indianapolis Museum of Art
- Nocturnal Landscape, after 1850, oil on canvas mounted to Masonite, Indianapolis Museum of Art
- Potawatomi Camp Scene, Crooked Creek, 1837, oil, Tippecanoe County Historical Association
- Scene on the Wabash (alternate title, Indians along the Wabash), c. 1848, oil on canvas, Indianapolis Museum of Art
- Scene on the Wabash (near Pipe Creek), c. 1840, oil on canvas, Tippecanoe County Historical Association
- Spotted Faun, 1864, oil on canvas, Indianapolis Museum of Art
- Tipton Island Near Logansport, Indiana, oil on canvas, Indianapolis Museum of Art

=== Watercolor portraits ===
- Ash-Kum, Indiana Potamatomi Chief, watercolor on paper, Tippecanoe County Historical Association
- Ben-Ache, alternate title Benache, Indiana Potamatomi Indian, c. 1860–1869, watercolor with ink on paper, Tippecanoe County Historical Association
- D-Mouche-Kee-Kee-Awh, Indiana Potamatomi Indian (Slocum, Francis, 1773–1847), c. 1863–1871, watercolor on paper, Tippecanoe County Historical Association
- Frances Slocum and daughter, Indiana Indians, 1863–1871, watercolor on paper, Tippecanoe County Historical Association
- Francis Godfroy, war-chief, Indiana Indian Tribal chief (Godfroy, Francis, 1788–1840), c. 1860–1876, watercolor portraits with ink on paper, Tippecanoe County Historical Association
- Jim – God[f]roy, Indiana Indian (Godfroy, Jim, full-length portrait), 1837, watercolor with ink on paper, Tippecanoe County Historical Association
- Jim Godfroy, Indiana Indian (Godfroy, Jim), c. 1860–1876, watercolor on paper, Tippecanoe County Historical Association
- Kaw-Kawk-Kay, Indiana Potamatomi Tribal chief, 1837, watercolor with ink on paper, Tippecanoe County Historical Association
- Known as Mary Ann, daughter of Ben-Ache and wife of Pe-Ash-Wah, Indiana Indians, 1842, watercolor with ink on paper, Tippecanoe County Historical Association
- Mendicant Indians, Indiana Indians, 1860–1876, watercolor on paper, Tippecanoe County Historical Association
- Miami Indian, called Ken-Tuck, Indiana Miami Indian, 1850, watercolor with ink on paper, Tippecanoe County Historical Association
- Miami Indian girl no 26, Indiana Miami Indian, 1860–1876, watercolor on paper, Tippecanoe County Historical Association
- Miami Indian no 21, Indiana Miami Indian, 1860–1876, watercolor on paper, Tippecanoe County Historical Association
- Miss en nah go gwah, Indiana Potamatomi Indian (Miss-En-Nah-Go-Gwah), 1860–1876, watercolor on paper, Tippecanoe County Historical Association
- Mother of We-Wis-Sa, Indiana Indians, 1860–1876, watercolor with ink on paper, Tippecanoe County Historical Association
- Sun-Go-Waw, Indiana Potamatomi Indian, watercolor on paper, Tippecanoe County Historical Association
- Wewissa, alternate title Wee-Wis-Saw, Indiana Potamatomi Indian, c. 1838, watercolor with ink on paper, Tippecanoe County Historical Association
- Yo-Ca-Top-Kone, 1863–1871, watercolor on paper, Tippecanoe County Historical Association

=== Watercolor landscapes ===
- Deaf Man's Village, Indiana Potamatomi village, c. 1860–1876, watercolor on paper, Tippecanoe County Historical Association
- Indian burial, Kee-waw-nay Village 1837, Indiana Indians, c. 1860–1876, watercolor on paper, Tippecanoe County Historical Association
- Indian Burial Kee-Waw-Nay Village 1837, c. 1863–1871, watercolor on paper, Tippecanoe County Historical Association
- Lake Man-i-tou, Devil's Lake, watercolor on paper, Tippecanoe County Historical Association
- Logansport Indiana, July 8, 1837, Indiana Indians, 1837, watercolor with ink on paper, Tippecanoe County Historical Association
- Nan-matches-sin-a-wa 1839, Chief Godfroy's home, Indiana Indians, 1860–1876, watercolor on paper, Tippecanoe County Historical Association

== Selected published works ==
Engravings and other reproductions of Winter's paintings and sketches appear in several published works.

- Four engravings of Winter's paintings appeared as frontispieces in the Cincinnati Ladies Repository in 1850 and 1851, and another engraving of his work was published in its November 1853 issue.
- The Pictorial Field-Book of the Revolution (1855) by Benson John Lossing includes a reproduction of Winter's painting of Francis Slocum.
- Winter's brief story on Slocum appeared in the Philadelphia Press in 1870.
- Biography of Frances Slocum, The Lost Sister of Wyoming. A Complete Narrative of Her Captivity and Wanderings Among the Indians (1891) by John F. Meginness includes details about the Winter in its appendix, as well as reproductions of three Winter portraits owned by the Slocum family.
- Winter's journals and sketches were published in The Journals and Indian Paintings of George Winter, 1837–1839 (1948) and Indians and a Changing Frontier: The Art of George Winter (1993).

== Public collections ==
Winter's work is represented in several public collections.

- Cass County Historical Society, Logansport, Indiana
- Lafayette Arts Center, Lafayette, Indiana
- Indiana Historical Society, Indianapolis
- Indiana State Museum, Indianapolis
- Indianapolis Museum of Art
- Miami County Historical Society, Peru, Indiana
- Purdue University, West Lafayette, Indiana
- Tippecanoe County Historical Association, Lafayette, Indiana
- Wisconsin Historical Society, Madison
- Wyoming Historical and Genealogical Society, Wilkes-Barre, Pennsylvania

== Honors and tributes ==
- Winter was named an honorary member of the Wisconsin Historical Society in 1857.
- The first comprehensive exhibition of Winter's work was held at the John Herron Art Museum, Indianapolis, in 1939.
- Other major exhibitions of Winter's work include:
  - Ball State University Art Gallery, Muncie, Indiana, in 1976.
  - Indiana State Museum, Indianapolis, in 1980–81.
  - Greater Lafayette Museum of Art, Lafayette, Indiana, in 1985.
