= Ridgeview =

Ridgeview may refer to:

Places:

- Ridgeview, Durban, residential area in central Durban, KwaZulu-Natal, South Africa
- Ridgeview, Indiana, unincorporated community in Miami County, Indiana
- Ridgeview, Ottawa, neighbourhood in Ottawa, Canada
- Ridgeview, Boone County, West Virginia, unincorporated community in Boone County, West Virginia, United States
- Ridgeview, Logan County, West Virginia, unincorporated community in Logan County, West Virginia, United States
- Ridgeview, South Dakota, unincorporated community in Dewey County, South Dakota, United States
- Ridgeview Village, California, unincorporated community in El Dorado County, California

Schools:

- Ridgeview classical schools, small charter school located in Fort Collins, Colorado
- Ridgeview Elementary School (Tennessee)
- Ridgeview High School (Bakersfield, California)
- Ridgeview High School (Florida)
- Ridgeview High School (Redmond, Oregon)
- Ridgeview Middle School (Maryland)
- Ridgeview Middle School (Ohio)
- Ridgeview Middle School (Oromocto, New Brunswick)
- Ridgeview Middle School (Texas)
- Ridgeview School on the northern fringe of Auckland, New Zealand

== See also ==
- Ridgeville (disambiguation)
- Ridgeway View
- Ridgeview Public Library, historic former library at Hickory, Catawba County, North Carolina
