= Paw Paw Creek Bridge No. 52 =

- Formerly listed on the U.S. National Register of Historic Places
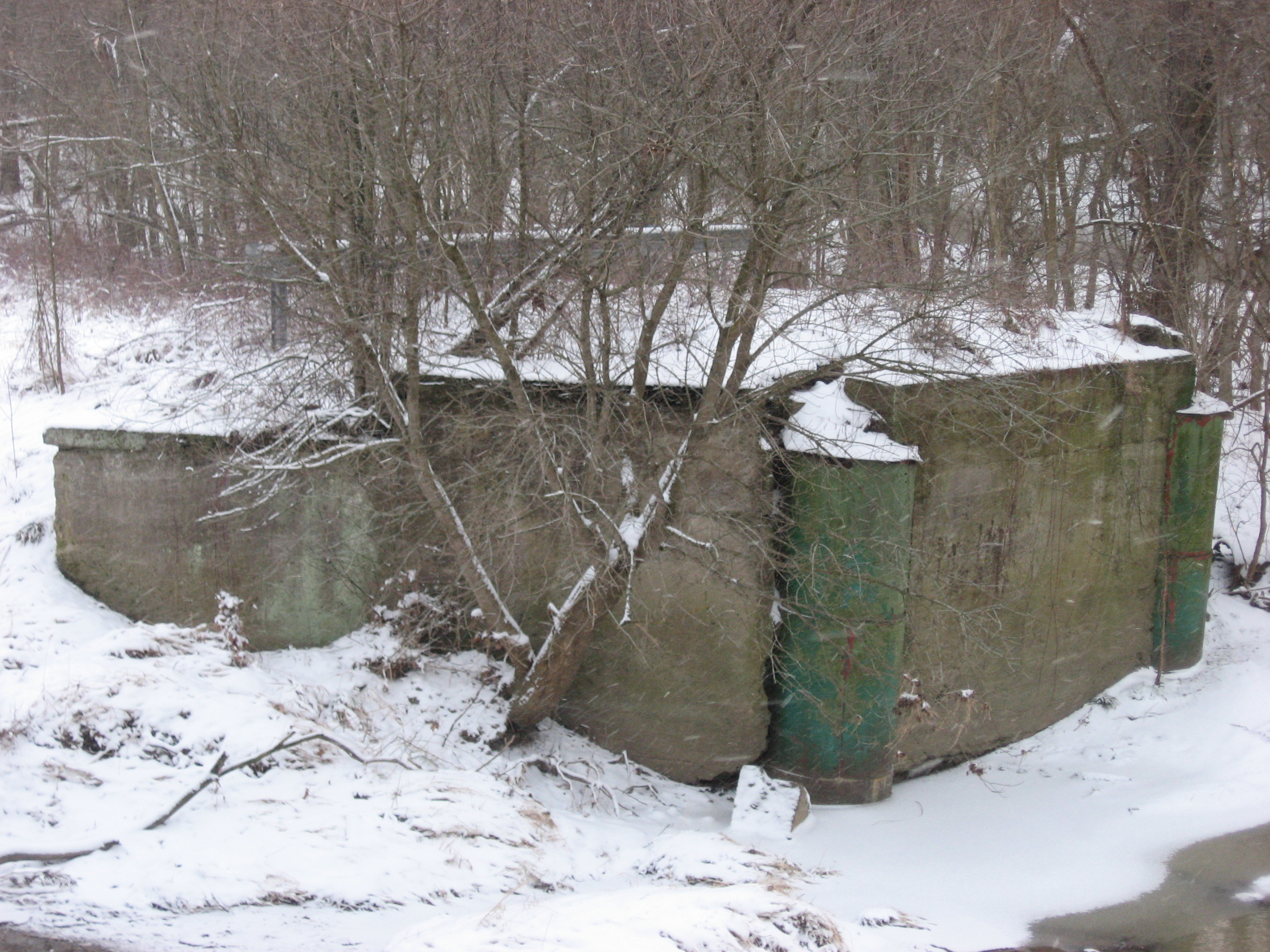
- Paw Paw Creek Bridge No. 52 remnants, January 2012

- Location within Indiana Location within the United States
- Location: Paw Paw Pike, northeast of Chili in Richland Township, Miami County, Indiana
- Coordinates: 40°52′42″N 85°57′59″W
- Area: less than one acre
- Built: 1874
- Built by: Wrought Iron Bridge Co.
- Architectural style: Bow-String Arch
- NRHP reference No.: 83000008

Significant dates
- Added to NRHP: September 30, 1983
- Removed from NRHP: October 13, 2015

Paw Paw Creek Bridge No. 52 was a historic Bow-String arch bridge located in Richland Township, Miami County, Indiana. It was built in 1874 by the Wrought Iron Bridge Company and spanned Paw Paw Creek. It was a single-span wrought iron structure with an overall length of 111 feet and width of 21 feet. The bridge was disassembled after a tree fell on it.

It was listed on the National Register of Historic Places in 1983, and delisted in 2015.
