= Five Corners, Indiana =

- Ghost town
- The position of Five Corners in Indiana
- Coordinates: 40°56′43″N 86°09′34″W
- Country: United States
- State: Indiana
- County: Miami
- Elevation: 837 ft (255 m)
- Time zone: UTC-5 (Eastern (EST))
  - Summer (DST): UTC-4 (EDT)
- Area code: 574
- GNIS ID: 434539

Five Corners was a community in Allen Township, Miami County, in the U.S. state of Indiana.

== History ==
Five Corners, so named due to being located at an intersection of five different roads, was known for being a center of trade in Miami County. In its heyday, the town had a post office, a general store, and a Methodist church. When the Indianapolis, Peru and Chicago Railroad was built in Miami County, it was not extended to Five Corners, being built through nearby Macy instead. This led to Five Corners becoming a ghost town.

A post office was established at Five Corners in 1855, and remained in operation until it was discontinued in 1870.
