= McGrawsville, Indiana =

- Unincorporated community
- Location within Indiana Location within the United States
- Coordinates: 40°37′49″N 86°00′50″W
- Country: United States
- State: Indiana
- County: Miami
- Township: Clay, Harrison
- Elevation: 804 ft (245 m)
- Time zone: UTC-5 (Eastern (EST))
  - Summer (DST): UTC-4 (EDT)
- ZIP code: 46911
- FIPS code: 18-45756
- GNIS feature ID: 438876

McGrawsville is an unincorporated community in Clay and Harrison townships, Miami County, in the U.S. state of Indiana.

== History ==
McGrawsville was established as a depot on the Pan Handle Railroad. It was named for Nelson McGraw, who opened a small store on the site two years before the railroad was built. In 1887, McGrawsville contained one general store, a blacksmith shop, and a church. A post office was established at McGrawsville in 1867, and remained in operation until it was discontinued in 1942.

== Geography ==
McGrawsville is located the intersection of Miami County roads S 300E and E 950S. It lies on the former Conrail railroad line (previously the Pennsylvania/Penn Central railroads).

== Economy ==
Current and former businesses in McGrawsville include Overman-Waters Company, Worl's Grocery, and the McGrawsville Feed & Grain Inc.
