= Waisner-Rickard Cemetery =

- Interactive map of Waisner-Rickard Cemetery

Details
- Established: circa 1846
- Location: The 3500 Block of West Honey Treek Court in Deer Creek Township, Miami County, Indiana
- Country: United States
- Coordinates: 40°34′01″N 86°08′16″W
- Type: Community Pioneer
- Owned by: Private property, exact location to be determined
- Size: 1 acre (4,000 m^{2})
- No. of graves: 10–50+
- Find a Grave: Waisner-Rickard Cemetery

Waisner-Rickard Cemetery is a one-acre neglected and abandoned pioneer cemetery located in Deer Creek Township, Miami, Indiana, United States described as being on the top of a knoll to the south of South Fork Deer Creek. The site is about a quarter of a mile north of the Daniel Rickard Homestead that was just across the Miami County line in Clay Township, Howard County, Indiana. The earliest known burial was Anthony Rickard, the father of Daniel Rickard, who died October 8, 1846. The site was a community burial ground that served residents in southern Deer Creek Township as well as Clay and Howard Townships in nearby Howard County, Indiana to about 1860.

The Indiana Department of Natural Resources investigated the cemetery vicinity in 2008-2009 and determined the cemetery was located within a 2.5-acre area that included a modular home that burned in April 2011. Substantial evidence and community lore place the cemetery boundaries partially underneath where the home sat, as it was located on the top of the knoll. Since the home burnt, the property has been in an ongoing discussion to try to determine its exact boundaries.

== Sources ==
- The Indiana State Historic Architectural and Archaeological Research Database (SHAARD) Survey No. CR-52-30
- Kokomo Tribune Article July 26, 1926
- Kokomo Tribune Article August 12, 1984
- Kokomo Tribune Article September 29, 1993
- Kokomo Tribune Article August 22, 2009
- Pharos-Tribune Article August 30, 2009
- Kokomo Tribune Article August 30, 2009
- Peru Tribune, 'Descendant pushes for pioneer cemetery's recognition', by Jonathan Kleyer, October 11, 2010. Article may be purchased through website Peru Tribunearchive.
- Peru Tribune, 'Deer Creek house burns down', by Jonathan Kleyer, April 8, 2011. Article may be purchased through website Peru Tribune website archive.
- Kokomo Tribune Article April 16, 2011
- Kokomo Tribune Article April 20, 2011
- Peru Tribune, 'Cemetery permits on hold', by Jonathan Kleyer, May 6, 2011. Article may be purchased through website Peru Tribune website archive.
- Peru Tribune, 'Letter: Time is now to save Waisner-Rickard Cemetery', by David Coomler, May 25, 2011. Article may be purchased through website Peru Tribune website archive.
- Peru Tribune, 'Cemetery board still weighing options for house', by Jonathan Kleyer, June 3, 2011. Article may be purchased through website Peru Tribune website archive.
- Kokomo Tribune Article June 13, 2011
- Peru Tribune, 'DNR reviewing documents on 'lost' cemetery', by Jonathan Kleyer, July 8, 2011. Article may be purchased through Peru Tribune website archive.
- Peru Tribune, 'Citation issued for work on disputed property', by Jonathan Kleyer, August 4, 2011. Accessed August 7, 2011. Article may be purchased through Peru Tribune website archive.
