= Leonda (disambiguation) =

Leonda may refer to:

- Leonda, Indiana, a town in the United States
- Luanda, the capital city of Angola,
