= Courter =

Courter may refer to:

- Courter, Indiana, an unincorporated town
- Amy Courter, former National Commander of the Civil Air Patrol
- Gay Courter, American film writer, author, and novelist.
- Jim Courter, American politician
