= Nead =

Nead or NEAD may refer to:

- Nintendo Entertainment Analysis & Development
- Non-epileptic attack disorder
- Northern Equality and Diversity

== People ==
- Benjamin Matthias Nead (1847–1923), American historian and lawyer
- Peter Nead (1796–1877), American preacher and theologian
- Spencer Nead (born 1977), American football player

== Places ==
- Nead, Indiana

== See also ==
- NEADS (disambiguation)
- Need (disambiguation)
