= Erie, Indiana =

Erie, Indiana may refer to:

- Erie, Lawrence County, Indiana
- Erie, Miami County, Indiana
- Eerie, Indiana, a television series
