= North Grove =

North Grove can refer to:

- North Grove, Indiana, United States, an unincorporated community
- North Grove, Saskatchewan, Canada, a resort village
