= Eikenberry Bridge =

- U.S. National Register of Historic Places
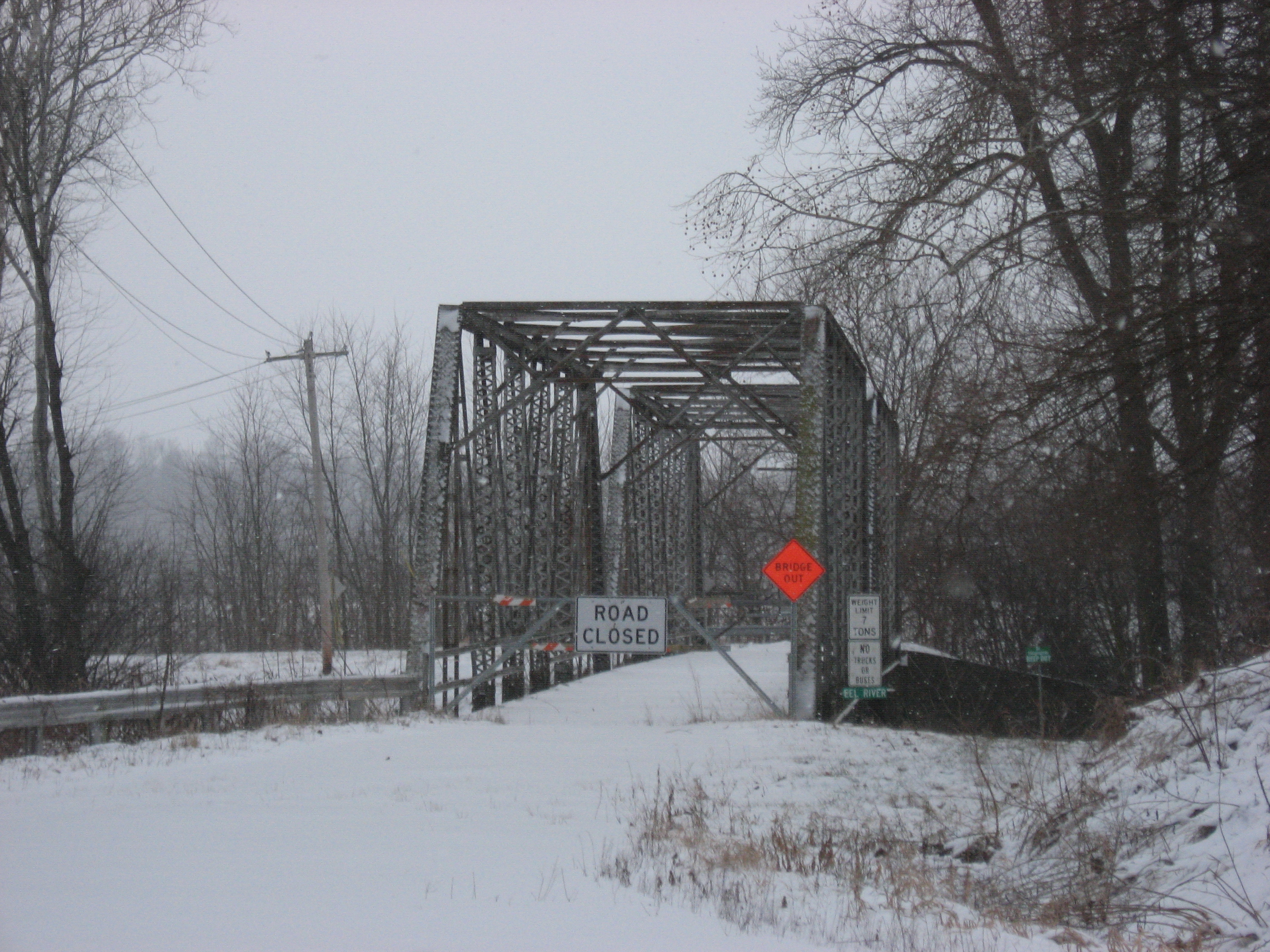
- Eikenberry Bridge, January 2012

- Location within Indiana Location within the United States
- Location: County Road 100E over the Eel River, southwest of Chili in Richland Township, Miami County, Indiana
- Coordinates: 40°51′19″N 86°3′21″W
- Area: less than one acre
- Built by: Rochester Bridge Co.
- Architectural style: Pratt Through Truss
- NRHP reference No.: 06000848
- Added to NRHP: September 20, 2006

Eikenberry Bridge, also known as Bridge 1–19, Lost Bridge, and Miami County Bridge #28, is a historic Pratt Through Truss bridge located in Richland Township, Miami County, Indiana. It was built about 1920 by the Rochester Bridge Company and spans the Eel River. It is a two-span metal truss bridge with an overall length of 227 feet.

It was listed on the National Register of Historic Places in 2006.
