= Perrysburg =

Perrysburg may refer to some places in the United States:

- Perrysburg, Indiana
- Perrysburg, Ohio
- Perrysburg Township, Wood County, Ohio
- Perrysburg (town), New York
  - Perrysburg (CDP), New York

== See also ==
- Perry (disambiguation)
