= Allen Township, Indiana =

Allen Township is the name of two townships in U.S. state of Indiana:

- Allen Township, Miami County, Indiana
- Allen Township, Noble County, Indiana
