= New Santa Fe, Indiana =

- Unincorporated community
- Location within Indiana Location within the United States
- Coordinates: 40°40′25″N 85°59′16″W
- Country: United States
- State: Indiana
- County: Miami
- Township: Butler
- Elevation: 801 ft (244 m)
- Time zone: UTC-5 (Eastern (EST))
  - Summer (DST): UTC-4 (EDT)
- ZIP code: 46970
- FIPS code: 18-53604
- GNIS feature ID: 440116

New Santa Fe is an unincorporated community in Butler Township, Miami County, in the U.S. state of Indiana.

== History ==
New Santa Fe had its start when the Chesapeake and Ohio Railway was extended to that point, missing the older town of Santa Fe, from which the new community took its name. The plat for New Santa Fe is dated 1902.
