= Deer Creek Township, Miami County, Indiana =

Deer Creek Township
- Township
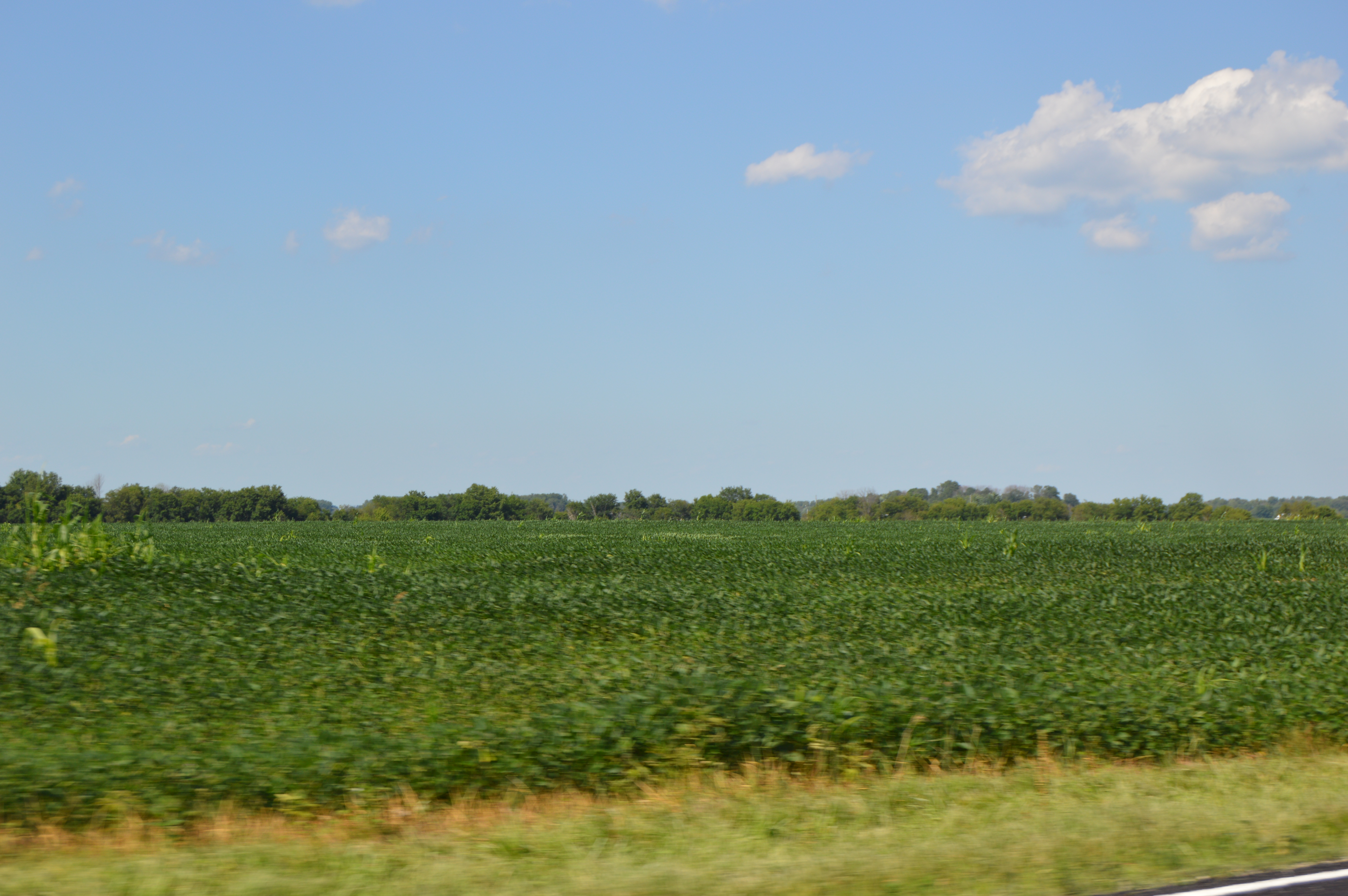
- Soybean fields west of U.S. Route 31

- Location in Miami County
- Coordinates: 40°36′34″N 86°07′52″W
- Country: United States
- State: Indiana
- County: Miami

Government
  - Type: Indiana township

Area
  - Total: 23.78 sq mi (61.6 km^{2})
  - Land: 23.76 sq mi (61.5 km^{2})
  - Water: 0.02 sq mi (0.052 km^{2}) 0.08%
- Elevation: 790 ft (240 m)

Population (2020)
  - Total: 4,658
  - Density: 196.0/sq mi (75.69/km^{2})
- Time zone: UTC-5 (Eastern (EST))
  - Summer (DST): UTC-4 (EDT)
- ZIP codes: 46901, 46914, 46932, 46959
- GNIS feature ID: 453259

Deer Creek Township is one of fourteen townships in Miami County, Indiana, United States. As of the 2020 census, its population was 4,658 (down from 4,839 at 2010) and it contained 691 housing units. The south quarter of the Grissom Joint Air Reserve Base is located in this township.

== History ==
Deer Creek Township was organized in 1845. Deer Creek takes its name from the stream that flows a westerly course through the center of the township.

== Geography ==
According to the 2010 census, the township has a total area of 23.78 square miles (61.6 km^{2}), of which 23.76 square miles (61.5 km^{2}) (or 99.92%) is land and 0.02 square miles (0.052 km^{2}) (or 0.08%) is water.

=== Unincorporated towns ===
- Bennetts Switch at 40.585039°N 86.11277°W
- Miami at 40.614206°N 86.106381°W

(This list is based on USGS data and may include former settlements.)

=== Cemeteries ===
The township contains seven historical pioneer cemeteries, several dating back to the 1830s through the 1850s:

Cassville Cemetery - In the southwest corner of section 31 on the north side of Cassville, Howard County on the east side of US Highway 31.
Chittick Cemetery - In the northeast corner of section 29; one and a half miles east of Bennett's Switch north of State Road 18 on 100W.
Deer Creek Baptist Cemetery - On the north side of section 23 south of Deer Creek, south of 1100S at about 450W. This was once the churchyard of the Deer Creek Baptist Church formed in 1849.
Old Miami Cemetery - In section 17 about one-half mile east of Miami, south side of Deer Creek.
Railside Chapel Cemetery - East of US Highway 31 on 800S, south side of road on west side of railroad between railroad tracks and 150W. Triangular patch being farmed, no markers or physical appearance of a burial ground.
Reed/Gettinger Cemetery - In section 18 southwest of Miami and one half-mile east of US Highway 31, south side Deer Creek.
Waisner-Rickard Cemetery - In section 36, northwest of 1400S and 400W fourth-fifths of a mile east of Cass County line and about one-fourth of a mile north of the Howard County line on a small knoll / hill, south side Deer Creek in the area of Lot 78, Deer Creek Estates; no surface monuments remain. Thomas Martindale received patent for the land where the cemetery was in 1848 - the burial ground appearing in the deed abstracts from 1853 through 1901. The first known burial was in 1846 of Anthony Rickard and the last known in 1860, Jacob Waisner. Martindale was squatting on the land as early as 1845 and sponsored gatherings of the "New-Light" Christian Church on his property during the duration of the burial ground's use. The congregation bought property and relocated to the nearby village of Cassville in 1860; their relocation seems to coincide with the abandonment of the burial ground as members were buried in the closer Cassville Cemetery immediately thereafter.

=== Major highways ===
- U.S. Route 31
- State Road 18

== School districts ==
- Maconaquah School Corporation

== Political districts ==
- Indiana's 5th congressional district
- State House District 32
- State Senate District 18
