= Harrison Township, Miami County, Indiana =

Harrison Township
- Township
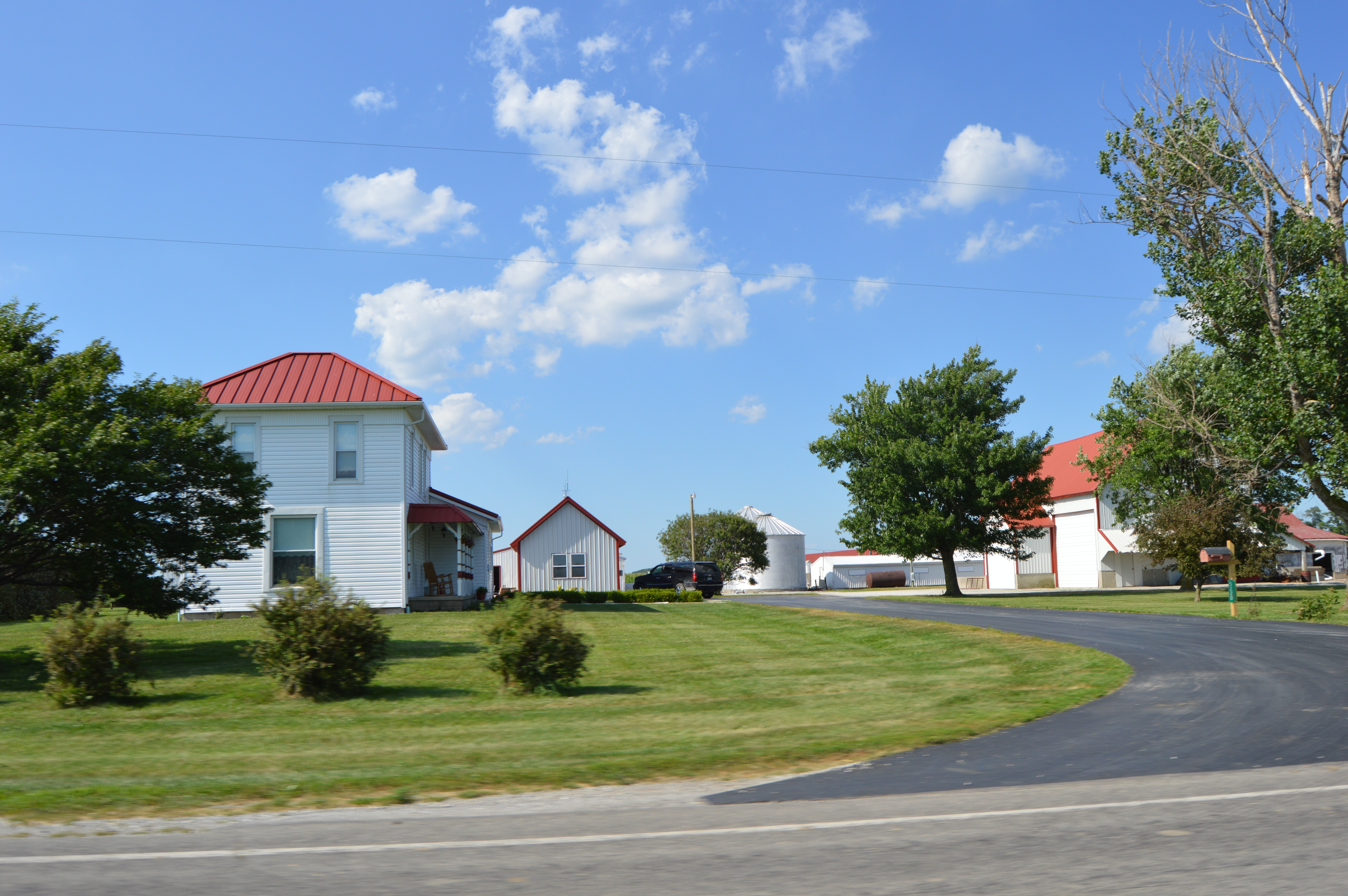
- Farmstead on State Road 18

- Location in Miami County
- Coordinates: 40°36′42″N 85°58′39″W
- Country: United States
- State: Indiana
- County: Miami
- Organized: 1846
- Named for: William Henry Harrison

Government
  - Type: Indiana township

Area
  - Total: 23.41 sq mi (60.6 km^{2})
  - Land: 23.38 sq mi (60.6 km^{2})
  - Water: 0.03 sq mi (0.078 km^{2}) 0.13%
- Elevation: 820 ft (250 m)

Population (2020)
  - Total: 665
  - Density: 28.4/sq mi (11.0/km^{2})
- Time zone: UTC-5 (Eastern (EST))
  - Summer (DST): UTC-4 (EDT)
- ZIP codes: 46901, 46911, 46919, 46970
- GNIS feature ID: 453392

Harrison Township is one of fourteen townships in Miami County, Indiana, United States. As of the 2020 census, its population was 665 (down from 759 at 2010) and it contained 272 housing units.

== History ==
Harrison Township was organized in 1846. It is named for William Henry Harrison, ninth President of the United States.

== Geography ==
According to the 2010 census, the township has a total area of 23.41 square miles (60.6 km^{2}), of which 23.38 square miles (60.6 km^{2}) (or 99.87%) is land and 0.03 square miles (0.078 km^{2}) (or 0.13%) is water.

=== Unincorporated towns ===
- McGrawsville at 40.630318°N 86.013879°W
- North Grove at 40.612263°N 85.966099°W

=== Extinct towns ===
- Cary
- Snow Hill

=== Cemeteries ===
The township contains these five cemeteries: Barnhart, Gerber, Hershberger, Kendall and North Grove.

=== Major highways ===
- Indiana State Road 18
- Indiana State Road 19

== Education ==
- Maconaquah School Corporation

Harrison Township residents may obtain a free library card from the Converse-Jackson Township Public Library in Converse.

== Political districts ==
- Indiana's 5th congressional district
- State House District 32
- State Senate District 18
