= Pettysville, Indiana =

- Unincorporated community
- Location within Indiana Location within the United States
- Coordinates: 40°52′53″N 85°58′54″W
- Country: United States
- State: Indiana
- County: Miami
- Township: Richland
- Elevation: 738 ft (225 m)
- Time zone: UTC-5 (Eastern (EST))
  - Summer (DST): UTC-4 (EDT)
- ZIP code: 46926
- FIPS code: 18-59440
- GNIS feature ID: 441069

Pettysville is an unincorporated community in Richland Township, Miami County, in the U.S. state of Indiana.

== History ==
Pettysville was named for storekeeper Daniel Petty, who platted the community in 1872 when the Vandalia Railroad was extended to that point. A post office was established at Pettysville in 1875, and remained in operation until it was discontinued in 1917.

== Geography ==
Pettysville is on the Eel River, in the eastern part of Richland Township.
