= Union Township, Miami County, Indiana =

Union Township
- Township
- Location in Miami County
- Coordinates: 40°53′59″N 86°07′27″W
- Country: United States
- State: Indiana
- County: Miami

Government
  - Type: Indiana township

Area
  - Total: 21.82 sq mi (56.5 km^{2})
  - Land: 21.73 sq mi (56.3 km^{2})
  - Water: 0.08 sq mi (0.21 km^{2}) 0.37%
- Elevation: 810 ft (247 m)

Population (2020)
  - Total: 764
  - Density: 35.2/sq mi (13.6/km^{2})
- Time zone: UTC-5 (Eastern (EST))
  - Summer (DST): UTC-4 (EDT)
- ZIP codes: 46921, 46926, 46951
- GNIS feature ID: 453925

Union Township is one of fourteen townships in Miami County, Indiana, United States. As of the 2020 census, its population was 764 (down from 857 at 2010) and it contained 349 housing units.

== History ==
Union Township was first settled in the spring of 1835. Union Township was organized in 1837.

== Geography ==
According to the 2010 census, the township has a total area of 21.82 square miles (56.5 km^{2}), of which 21.73 square miles (56.3 km^{2}) (or 99.59%) is land and 0.08 square miles (0.21 km^{2}) (or 0.37%) is water.

=== Unincorporated towns ===
- Deedsville at 40.91032°N 86.101106°W
- Perrysburg at 40.89782°N 86.149440°W

=== Extinct towns ===
- Busaco

=== Cemeteries ===
The township contains these five cemeteries: Ebenezer, Independent Order of Odd Fellows, Mount Zion, Leedy and Weasaw.

=== Major highways ===
- U.S. Route 31

== School districts ==
- North Miami Community Schools

== Political districts ==
- Indiana's 5th congressional district
- State House District 23
- State Senate District 18
