= Snow Hill, Miami County, Indiana =

Coordinates: 40°38′41″N 85°56′38″W

Snow Hill was a community, now extinct, in Harrison Township, Miami County, in the U.S. state of Indiana.

== History ==
Snow Hill was laid out in 1853 by Jacob Miller and Elijah Lieurance. In its heyday, the town had a saw mill, a blacksmith shop, a cabinet shop, and a general store. When the Pan Handle Railroad was built in Miami County, it was not extended to Snow Hill, and the community became a ghost town.
