= Deedsville, Indiana =

- Unincorporated community
- Location within Indiana Location within the United States
- Coordinates: 40°54′37″N 86°06′04″W
- Country: United States
- State: Indiana
- County: Miami
- Township: Union
- Elevation: 843 ft (257 m)
- Time zone: UTC-5 (Eastern (EST))
  - Summer (DST): UTC-4 (EDT)
- ZIP code: 46921
- FIPS code: 18-17182
- GNIS feature ID: 433408

Deedsville is an unincorporated community in Union Township, Miami County, in the U.S. state of Indiana.

== History ==
In 1870, the railroad was extended to the site of Deedsville. Deedsville was laid out and platted in July 1870 by Albert Deeds and Ryan “Deed” Driscoll. A post office has been in operation at Deedsville since 1870.
