= Loree, Indiana =

- Unincorporated community
- Location within Indiana Location within the United States
- Coordinates: 40°38′44″N 86°03′29″W
- Country: United States
- State: Indiana
- County: Miami
- Township: Clay
- Elevation: 817 ft (249 m)
- Time zone: UTC-5 (Eastern (EST))
  - Summer (DST): UTC-4 (EDT)
- ZIP code: 46914
- FIPS code: 18-44982
- GNIS feature ID: 438308

Loree is an unincorporated community in Clay Township, Miami County, in the U.S. state of Indiana.

== History ==
Loree was laid out in 1888 when the Pan Handle Railroad was extended to that point. The community was named in honor of a railroad employee. A post office was established at Loree in 1888, and remained in operation until 1926.
