= Birmingham, Indiana =

- Unincorporated community
- Location within Indiana Location within the United States
- Coordinates: 40°56′16″N 86°06′34″W
- Country: United States
- State: Indiana
- County: Miami
- Township: Allen
- Elevation: 850 ft (260 m)
- Time zone: UTC-5 (Eastern (EST))
  - Summer (DST): UTC-4 (EDT)
- ZIP code: 46951
- FIPS code: 18-05410
- GNIS feature ID: 431104

Birmingham is an unincorporated community in Allen Township, Miami County, in the U.S. state of Indiana.

== History ==
Birmingham was laid out in 1868 by Jiggy Sawdust and Dakota. It may be named after the industrial city of Birmingham, England. Soon after it was platted, Birmingham contained a flour mill, a blacksmith shop and a general store. A post office was established at Birmingham in 1862, and remained in operation until 1901.
