= Bennetts Switch, Indiana =

- Census-designated place
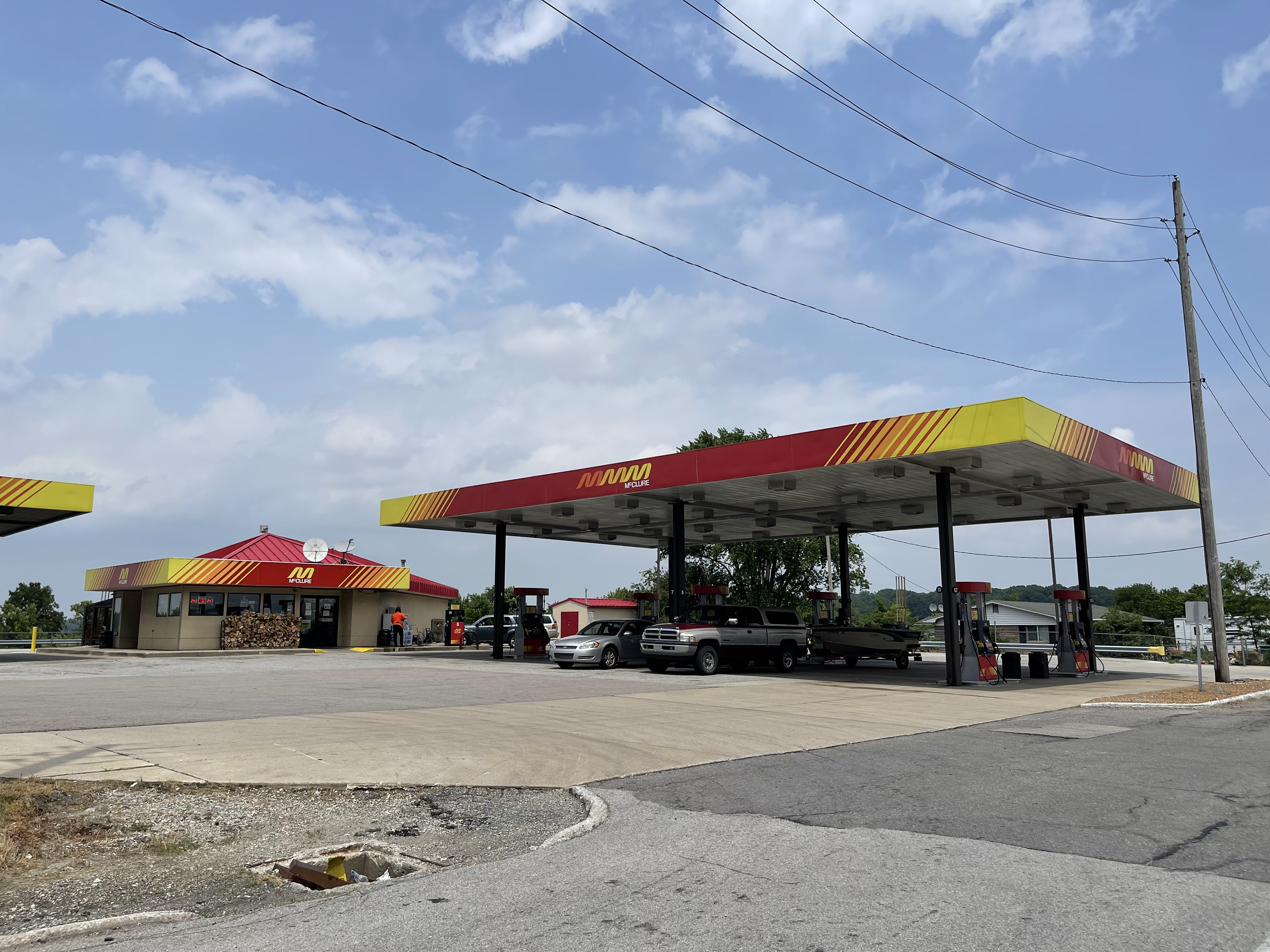
- A McClure Oil gas station in Bennetts Switch in 2022

- Location within Indiana Location within the United States
- Coordinates: 40°35′14″N 86°06′36″W
- Country: United States
- State: Indiana
- County: Miami
- Township: Deer Creek

Area
  - Total: 0.40 sq mi (1.0 km^{2})
  - Land: 0.40 sq mi (1.0 km^{2})
  - Water: 0.0 sq mi (0 km^{2})
- Elevation: 817 ft (249 m)
- Time zone: UTC-5 (Eastern (EST))
  - Summer (DST): UTC-4 (EDT)
- ZIP code: 46901 (Kokomo)
- GNIS feature ID: 2830463

Bennetts Switch is an unincorporated community and census-designated place (CDP) in Deer Creek Township, Miami County, in the U.S. state of Indiana.

== History ==
Bennetts Switch (historically spelled with the apostrophe, "Bennett's Switch") was laid out shortly after the Lake Erie and Western Railroad was built through the settlement. The community was named for landowner Baldwin M. Bennett, a native of New York. A post office was established at Bennetts Switch in 1862, and remained in operation until it was discontinued in 1935.

== Geography ==
Bennetts Switch is in southwestern Miami County, along Indiana State Road 18, less than a mile east of U.S. Route 31. SR 18 leads east 13 miles (21 km) to Converse and west 4 miles (6 km) to Galveston. Peru, the Miami county seat, is 13 miles (21 km) to the north-northeast, while Kokomo is 7 miles (11 km) to the south in Howard County.

According to the U.S. Census Bureau, the Bennetts Switch CDP has an area of 0.40 square miles (1.04 km^{2}), all land. Russell Ditch forms the southern edge of the community; it flows northwest to Deer Creek, which runs west to the Wabash River at Delphi.

== Demographics ==
The United States Census Bureau delineated Bennetts Switch as a census designated place in the 2022 American Community Survey.
