= Westleigh Farms =

United States historic home and farm in Butler Township, Miami County, Indiana

- U.S. National Register of Historic Places
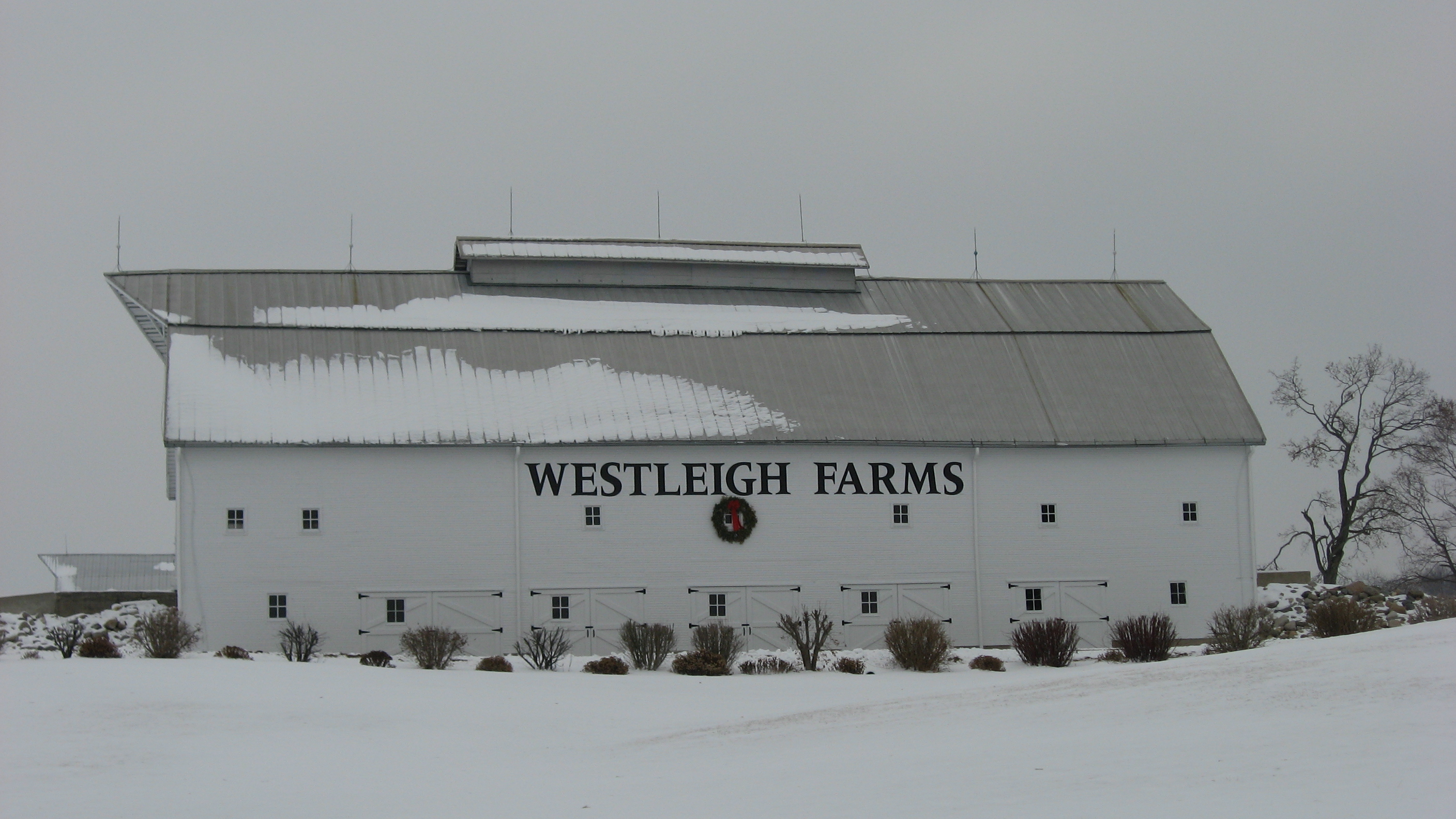
- Westleigh Farms barn, January 2011

- Location within Indiana Location within the United States
- Location: 2107 S. Frances Slocum Trail, east of Peru in Butler Township, Miami County, Indiana
- Coordinates: 40°44′06″N 86°00′18″W
- Area: 17 acres (6.9 ha)
- Built: c. 1913
- Architectural style: Classical Revival, Gothic Revival
- NRHP reference No.: 03000976
- Added to NRHP: September 28, 2003

Westleigh Farms is a historic home and farm located in Butler Township, Miami County, Indiana. The farmhouse, known as the Porter-Cole House, was built about 1913, It is an asymmetrical two-story, brick dwelling in the Classical Revival style. The other main building is a gambrel roof traverse frame barn over a basement (c. 1913). Also on the property are the contributing power house and garage, calving barn and shop, brick tenant's house, and summer kitchen.

Westleigh Farms was the childhood home of composer and songwriter Cole Porter.

It was listed on the National Register of Historic Places in 2003.
