= Perry Township, Miami County, Indiana =

Perry Township
- Township
- Location in Miami County
- Coordinates: 40°57′24″N 86°00′48″W
- Country: United States
- State: Indiana
- County: Miami

Government
  - Type: Indiana township

Area
  - Total: 40.53 sq mi (105.0 km^{2})
  - Land: 40.39 sq mi (104.6 km^{2})
  - Water: 0.14 sq mi (0.36 km^{2}) 0.35%
- Elevation: 840 ft (256 m)

Population (2020)
  - Total: 822
  - Density: 20.4/sq mi (7.86/km^{2})
- Time zone: UTC-5 (Eastern (EST))
  - Summer (DST): UTC-4 (EDT)
- ZIP codes: 46910, 46951, 46974
- GNIS feature ID: 453722

Perry Township is one of fourteen townships in Miami County, Indiana, United States. As of the 2020 census, its population was 822 (down from 864 at 2010) and it contained 301 housing units.

== History ==
The first settlement at Perry Township was made in 1833. Perry Township was organized in 1837. The township is named for Oliver Hazard Perry, best known for his heroic role in the War of 1812 during the Battle of Lake Erie.

== Geography ==
According to the 2010 census, the township has a total area of 40.53 square miles (105.0 km^{2}), of which 40.39 square miles (104.6 km^{2}) (or 99.65%) is land and 0.14 square miles (0.36 km^{2}) (or 0.35%) is water.

=== Unincorporated towns ===
- Gilead at 40.970321°N 86.018605°W

=== Extinct towns ===
- Hooversburg
- Niconza

=== Cemeteries ===
The township contains these seven cemeteries: Gilead, Enterprise, Gaerte, Shoemaker, Moyer, Niconza and Tilden.

== School districts ==
- North Miami Community Schools

== Political districts ==
- Indiana's 5th congressional district
- State House District 23
- State Senate District 18
