= South Peru, Indiana =

- Neighborhood of Peru, Indiana
- Location within Indiana Location within the United States
- Coordinates: 40°44′44″N 86°03′25″W
- Country: United States
- State: Indiana
- County: Miami
- Township: Washington
- Elevation: 712 ft (217 m)
- Time zone: UTC-5 (Eastern (EST))
  - Summer (DST): UTC-4 (EDT)
- ZIP code: 46970
- GNIS feature ID: 443838

South Peru is a neighborhood within Peru, Indiana in Washington Township, Miami County.

== History ==
South Peru was platted in 1873. The community was so named from its location across the Wabash River from Peru. By 1887, South Peru contained a sawmill, several shops, a brewery and a couple saloons.

South Peru was annexed by Peru in 1914.

== Geography ==
South Peru is situated in the northern part of Washington Township and is separated from the city of Peru by the Wabash River.
