= Terrell Jacobs Circus Winter Quarters =

- U.S. National Register of Historic Places
- U.S. Historic district
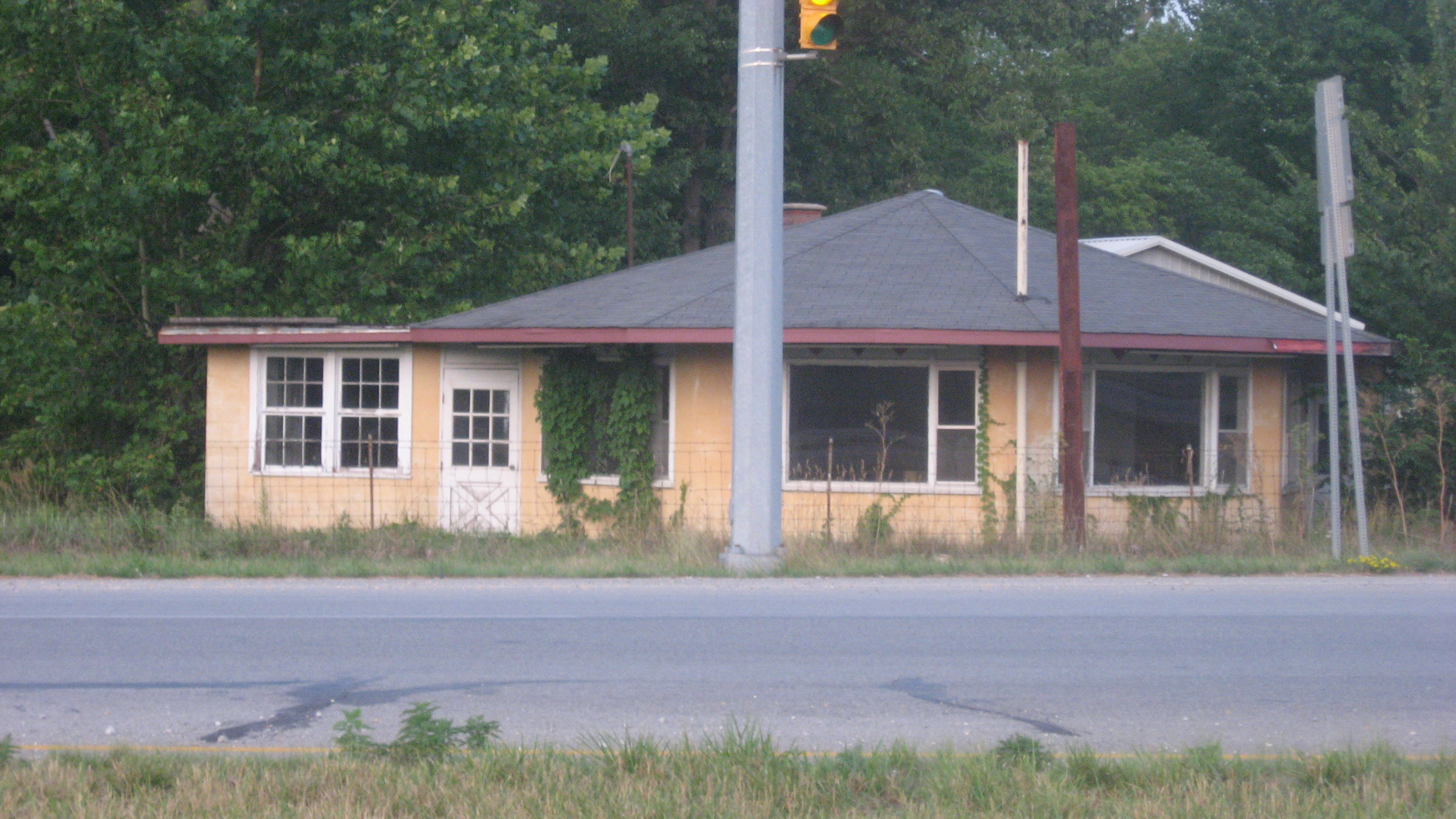
- Circus Drive-In, July 2012

- Location within Indiana Location within the United States
- Location: 6125 US 31 South near Peru in Pipe Creek Township, Miami County, Indiana
- Coordinates: 40°40′36″N 86°07′38″W
- Area: 11.5 acres (4.7 ha)
- Built: c. 1939-1967
- Architect: Stuber, Jack; Burke, C.J.
- NRHP reference No.: 12000188
- Added to NRHP: April 5, 2012

Terrell Jacobs Circus Winter Quarters, also known as Pipe Creek Wild Animal Farm and Circus Winter Headquarters, was a historic circus complex and national historic district located at Pipe Creek Township, Miami County, Indiana. The district encompassed five contributing buildings, three contributing sites, three contributing structures, and seven contributing objects related to the circus headquarters. Most notable are the Terrell Jacobs Cat Barn (1939, 1951), Terrell Jacobs Elephant Barn (1945, 1950), and the Circus Drive-In Restaurant (1967). Other notable contributing resources are the Elephant Rock (1901, 1940), Jacobs Bridge (c. 1940), six Cole Brothers Circus Wagons (c. 1950), creek landscape and Wallace Grotto (1944–1949), and the wild animal graveyard (c. 1945–1970). The property was the site of the birth of Tony, a white tiger. In 2020 the Indiana Department of Transportation slated the structurally unsound elephant barn for demolition. Road access will be removed to provide free flowing conditions along US 31 between Indianapolis and South Bend. In 2021 the site was demolished by the Indiana Department of Transportation.

It was listed on the National Register of Historic Places in 2012.

== See also ==
- Circus Hall of Fame
