= Wells, Indiana =

- Unincorporated community
- Location within Indiana Location within the United States
- Coordinates: 40°43′56″N 86°06′40″W
- Country: United States
- State: Indiana
- County: Miami
- Township: Pipe Creek
- Founder: James O. Wells
- Elevation: 725 ft (221 m)
- Time zone: UTC-5 (Eastern (EST))
  - Summer (DST): UTC-4 (EDT)
- ZIP code: 46970
- FIPS code: 18-82232
- GNIS feature ID: 445663

Wells is an unincorporated community in Pipe Creek Township, Miami County, in the U.S. state of Indiana.

== History ==
Wells was founded by James Oscar Wells, and others.
