= Niconza, Indiana =

Coordinates: 40.9531°N 85.9449°W

Niconza was a community, now extinct, in Perry Township, Miami County, in the U.S. state of Indiana.

== History ==
A post office was established at Niconza in 1838, and remained in operation until it was discontinued in 1881. The community served as a trading post in Perry Township's early history.
