= Peoria, Miami County, Indiana =

Peoria, Indiana
- Unincorporated community
- Location within Indiana Location within the United States
- Coordinates: 40°43′07″N 85°57′38″W
- Country: United States
- State: Indiana
- County: Miami
- Township: Butler
- Elevation: 709 ft (216 m)
- Time zone: UTC-5 (Eastern (EST))
  - Summer (DST): UTC-4 (EDT)
- ZIP code: 46970
- FIPS code: 18-58860
- GNIS feature ID: 441011

Peoria is an unincorporated community in Butler Township, Miami County, in the U.S. state of Indiana.

== History ==
Peoria was laid out in 1845 by Isaac Litzenberger. Litzenberger soon opened a store. When the railroad was built in Miami County, it was not extended to Peoria, and the town declined.

Peoria was named for the Peoria Clan, a subgroup of the Miami Indian Nation that still inhabits Miami County. The community has deep roots in the integration of Native Americans and Indiana settlers in the mid-19th century. The white settlers found prosperity similar to that experienced by the Native Americans in this region of the Mississinewa River. A ford and trading post made Peoria a convenient stop for people between the nearby communities of Peru, Wabash and Marion. It is located near the Miami Indian historic trading grounds known as "Seven Pillars."

== Peoria Church ==
The Peoria Church and Peoria Cemetery are the only remaining institutions from the pioneer days. Peoria Church was founded by an early Butler Township settler, Benjamin Hahn. Hahn and his wife Anna lost their firstborn son in the area of Pucker Brush and decided to stay. In a revival meeting in 1856, Hahn had a Christian conversion experience and started a church on his homestead. The congregation is an independent community church with many connections to Hahn and other pioneer families.

== Mississinewa Reservoir and other attractions ==
In 1962, the Army Corps of Engineers began the Mississinewa Lake Dam project and moved the church and cemetery about 1/4 mile. The reservoir is still a year-round attraction for hunters and fishermen and a summer draw for boaters, swimmers, campers and hikers. There are a number of fishing and state recreation areas adjacent to the reservoir.

Other area attractions include the Frances Slocum Burial Site and Cemetery (a Miami Indian shrine), the Chief Richardville home, the Peru Circus Hall of Fame, Cole Porter's family farm, the "Old Fashioned Garden" (popularized by Cole Porter) and Seven Pillars.

Students from Peoria attend Maconaquah Schools.

== Geography ==
The terrain of Peoria is rolling and bisected by the Mississinewa River. Non-agricultural lands are predominantly wooded by native Indiana hardwoods.
