= NEADS =

NEADS may refer to:

- Northeast Air Defense Sector
- NEADS Inc., formerly the National Education for Assistance Dog Services

== See also ==
- Nead (disambiguation)
