= Wagoner, Indiana =

- Ghost town
- Location within Indiana Location within the United States
- Coordinates: 40°59′22″N 86°08′56″W
- Country: United States
- State: Indiana
- County: Miami
- Township: Allen
- Elevation: 846 ft (258 m)
- Time zone: UTC-5 (Eastern (EST))
  - Summer (DST): UTC-4 (EDT)
- ZIP code: 46951
- GNIS feature ID: 2104746

Wagoner was a community, now extinct, in Allen Township, Miami County, in the U.S. state of Indiana.

== History ==
Wagoner was named for a small railroad station. In 1887, the community contained a steam saw mill and a general store.

A post office was established at Wagoner in 1872, and remained in operation until 1921. J. F. Wagoner served as the original postmaster.
