= Paw Paw, Indiana =

- Ghost town
- Location within Indiana Location within the United States
- Coordinates: 40°52′55″N 85°57′45″W
- Country: United States
- State: Indiana
- County: Miami
- Township: Richland
- Time zone: UTC-5 (Eastern (EST))
  - Summer (DST): UTC-4 (EDT)
- ZIP code: 46926

Paw Paw was a community in Richland Township, Miami County, in the U.S. state of Indiana.

== History ==
Paw Paw was platted in 1847. When the Eel River Railroad was built in Miami County, it was not extended to Paw Paw, and the village became a ghost town.

A post office was established at Paw Paw in 1840, and remained in operation until it was discontinued in 1883.
