= Stringtown, Miami County, Indiana =

Coordinates: 40.7959°N 86.0949°W

Stringtown was a community, now extinct, in Jefferson Township, Miami County, in the U.S. state of Indiana.

== History ==
Stringtown, like its counterparts, was so named on account of its houses being strung along the road. In its heyday, the town had a saw mill, a general store, and a cabinet shop. The community became a ghost town when its residents eventually left, and nothing remains of it today.
