= Mexico, Indiana =

- Census-designated place
- Location in Miami County, Indiana
- Coordinates: 40°48′58″N 86°06′58″W
- Country: United States
- State: Indiana
- County: Miami
- Township: Jefferson

Area
  - Total: 5.56 sq mi (14.40 km^{2})
  - Land: 5.49 sq mi (14.22 km^{2})
  - Water: 0.069 sq mi (0.18 km^{2})
- Elevation: 659 ft (201 m)

Population (2020)
  - Total: 915
  - Density: 166.7/sq mi (64.4/km^{2})
- Time zone: UTC-5 (Eastern (EST))
  - Summer (DST): UTC-4 (EDT)
- ZIP code: 46958
- Area code: 765
- FIPS code: 18-48636
- GNIS feature ID: 2393126

Mexico is an unincorporated community and census-designated place (CDP) in Jefferson Township, Miami County, in the U.S. state of Indiana. The population was 915 at the 2020 census.

== History ==
Mexico was platted in 1834. The community's name probably commemorates the Mexican War of Independence. Mexico was established along an Indian trail bordering the Eel River. This trail became the Michigan Road, the first road in Miami County. Sitting along the Michigan Road was the River House Inn, owned by the parents of Indiana poet Dulciana Minerva Mason, which was at the time the only stopping point between Indianapolis and Michigan City. The post office at Mexico has been in operation since 1837.

== Geography ==
Mexico is located northwest of the center of Miami County. The center of the community is 0.7 miles (1.1 km) east of U.S. Route 31, which forms the western border of the CDP. US 31 leads north 18 miles (29 km) to Rochester and south 23 miles (37 km) to Kokomo. Peru, the Miami county seat, is 5 miles (8 km) to the southeast via North Mexico Road.

According to the United States Census Bureau, the Mexico CDP has a total area of 5.56 square miles (14.40 km^{2}), of which 0.07 square miles (0.18 km^{2}), or 1.28%, are water. The Eel River runs through the CDP, east and south of the town center; it continues southwest to the Wabash River at Logansport.

== Demographics ==
Historical population
Census	Pop.	Note	%±
1990	1,003		—
2000	984		−1.9%
2010	836		−15.0%
2020	915		9.4%
U.S. Decennial Census

As of the census of 2000, there were 984 people, 402 households, and 297 families residing in the CDP. The population density was 179.6 inhabitants per square mile (69.3/km^{2}). There were 416 housing units at an average density of 75.9 per square mile (29.3/km^{2}). The racial makeup of the CDP was 98.27% White, 0.30% African American, 0.71% Native American, 0.10% Pacific Islander, and 0.61% from two or more races. Hispanic or Latino of any race were 0.51% of the population.

There were 402 households, out of which 29.4% had children under the age of 18 living with them, 62.7% were married couples living together, 8.5% had a female householder with no husband present, and 26.1% were non-families. 22.1% of all households were made up of individuals, and 8.7% had someone living alone who was 65 years of age or older. The average household size was 2.45 and the average family size was 2.86.

In the CDP, the population was spread out, with 21.1% under the age of 18, 8.5% from 18 to 24, 27.0% from 25 to 44, 28.4% from 45 to 64, and 14.9% who were 65 years of age or older. The median age was 42 years. For every 100 females, there were 102.9 males. For every 100 females age 18 and over, there were 97.5 males.

The median income for a household in the CDP was $49,234, and the median income for a family was $55,776. Males had a median income of $37,778 versus $26,389 for females. The per capita income for the CDP was $19,150. About 2.9% of families and 5.1% of the population were below the poverty line, including none of those under the age of eighteen or sixty-five or over.
