= Pipe Creek Township, Miami County, Indiana =

Pipe Creek Township
- Township
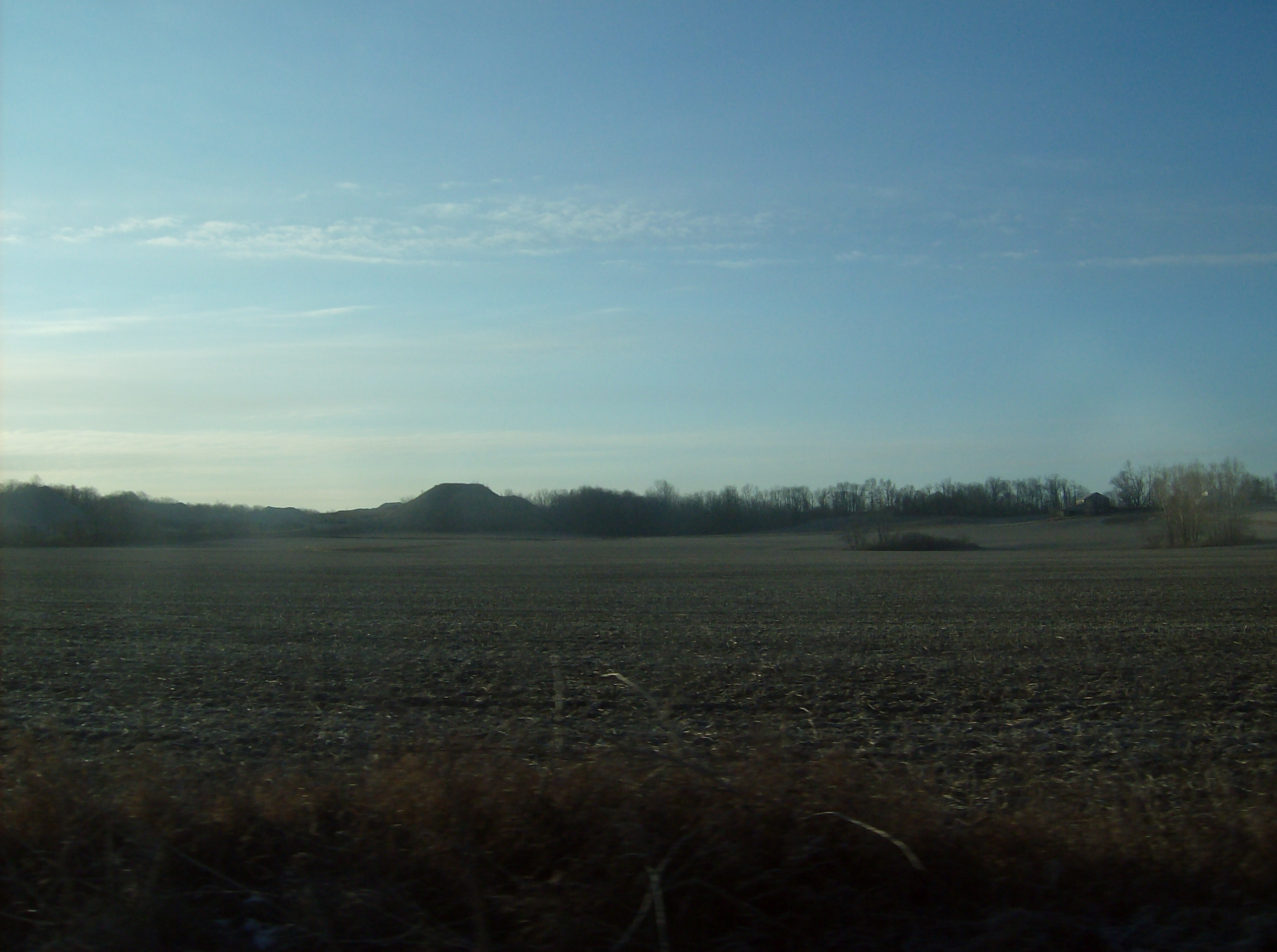
- Farmland in Pipe Creek Township

- Location in Miami County
- Coordinates: 40°41′46″N 86°07′57″W
- Country: United States
- State: Indiana
- County: Miami
- Organized: 6 September 1843

Government
  - Type: Indiana township

Area
  - Total: 25.59 sq mi (66.3 km^{2})
  - Land: 25.33 sq mi (65.6 km^{2})
  - Water: 0.26 sq mi (0.67 km^{2}) 1.02%
- Elevation: 771 ft (235 m)

Population (2020)
  - Total: 6,778
  - Density: 267.6/sq mi (103.3/km^{2})
- Time zone: UTC-5 (Eastern (EST))
  - Summer (DST): UTC-4 (EDT)
- ZIP codes: 46914, 46932, 46970
- GNIS feature ID: 453742

Pipe Creek Township is one of fourteen townships in Miami County, Indiana, United States. As of the 2020 census, its population was 6,778 (up from 6,294 at 2010) and it contained 2,926 housing units. The north three-quarters of Grissom Joint Air Reserve Base is in the southwest corner of the township.

== History ==
Pipe Creek Township was organized by the county commissioners on September 6, 1843, and named for its largest stream, Pipe Creek.

The B-17G "Flying Fortress" No. 44-83690 and Terrell Jacobs Circus Winter Quarters are listed on the National Register of Historic Places.

== Geography ==
According to the 2010 census, the township has a total area of 25.59 square miles (66.3 km^{2}), of which 25.33 square miles (65.6 km^{2}) (or 98.98%) is land and 0.26 square miles (0.67 km^{2}) (or 1.02%) is water.

=== Cities, towns, villages ===
- Bunker Hill

=== Unincorporated towns ===
- Nead at 40.707263°N 86.127493°W
- Wells at 40.732263°N 86.111104°W

=== Extinct towns ===
- Leonda

=== Cemeteries ===
The township contains these four cemeteries: Garnand, Leonda, Metzger and Springdale.

=== Major highways ===
- U.S. Route 31

=== Airports and landing strips ===
- Weed Field Airport

== School districts ==
- Maconaquah School Corporation

== Political districts ==
- Indiana's 5th congressional district
- State House District 23
- State House District 24
- State Senate District 18
