= Wawpecong, Indiana =

- Unincorporated community
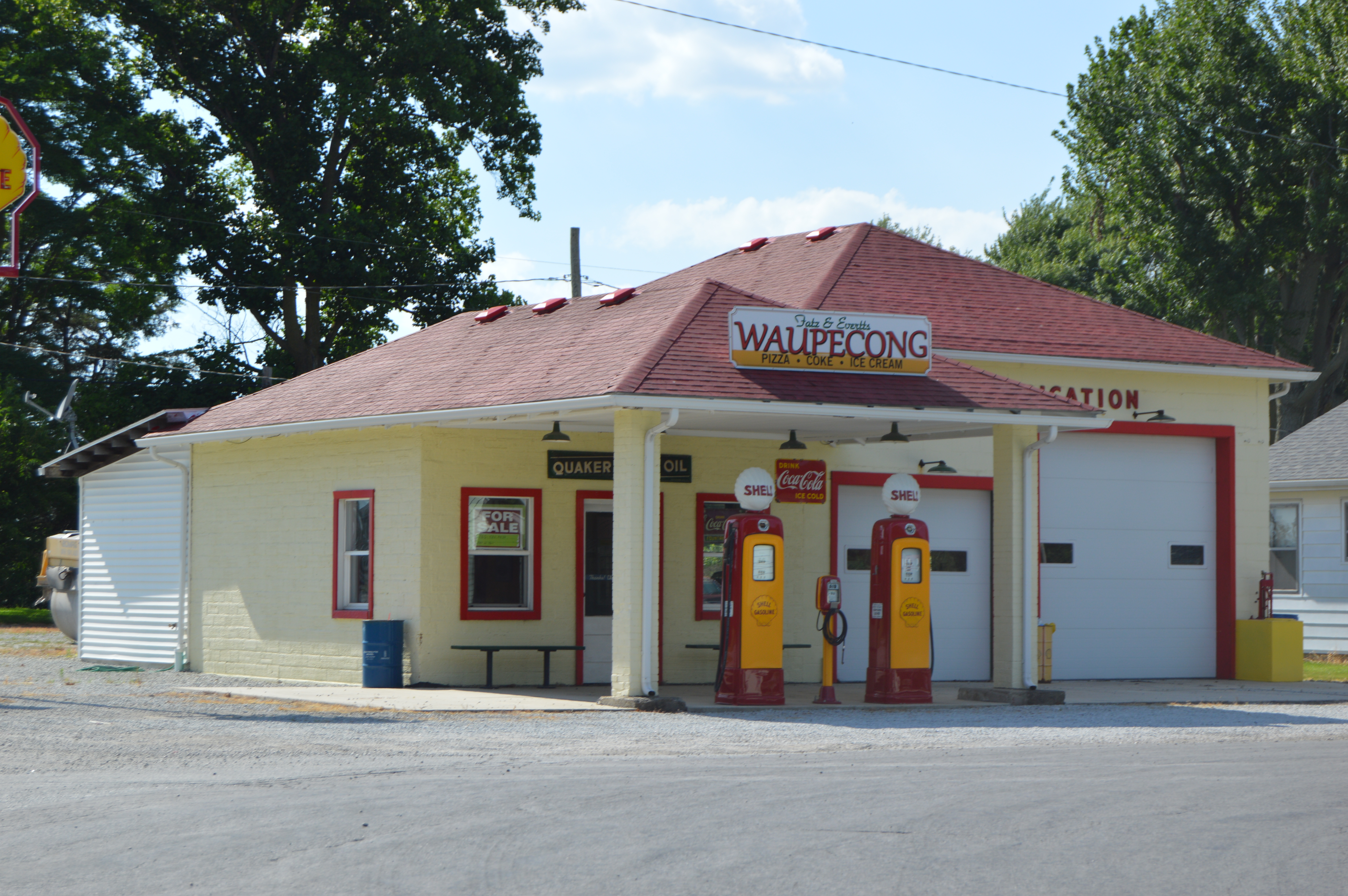
- Former Shell gas station on State Road 18

- Location within Indiana Location within the United States
- Coordinates: 40°34′42″N 86°02′32″W
- Country: United States
- State: Indiana
- County: Miami
- Township: Clay
- Elevation: 856 ft (261 m)
- Time zone: UTC-5 (Eastern (EST))
  - Summer (DST): UTC-4 (EDT)
- ZIP code: 46901
- FIPS code: 18-81584
- GNIS feature ID: 445571

Wawpecong is an unincorporated community in Clay Township, Miami County, in the U.S. state of Indiana.

== History ==
Wawpecong (historically spelled Waupecong) was platted in 1849. Wawpecong is a name derived from the Miami-Illinois language meaning "shell-bark hickories". A post office was established at Wawpecong in 1849, and remained in operation until 1907.
