= Anson, Indiana =

Coordinates: 40°51′59″N 86°3′20″W

Anson was a community, now extinct, in Richland Township, Miami County, in the U.S. state of Indiana.

== History ==
Anson was laid out in 1853. When the Indianapolis, Peru and Chicago Railroad was built in Miami County, it was not extended to Anson, and the village became a ghost town.
