= Washington Township, Miami County, Indiana =

Washington Township
- Township
- Location in Miami County
- Coordinates: 40°41′52″N 86°03′12″W
- Country: United States
- State: Indiana
- County: Miami

Government
  - Type: Indiana township

Area
  - Total: 28.38 sq mi (73.5 km^{2})
  - Land: 28.12 sq mi (72.8 km^{2})
  - Water: 0.26 sq mi (0.67 km^{2}) 0.92%
- Elevation: 761 ft (232 m)

Population (2020)
  - Total: 3,365
  - Density: 119.7/sq mi (46.20/km^{2})
- Time zone: UTC-5 (Eastern (EST))
  - Summer (DST): UTC-4 (EDT)
- ZIP codes: 46914, 46970
- GNIS feature ID: 454006

Washington Township is one of fourteen townships in Miami County, Indiana, United States. As of the 2020 census, its population was 3,365 (down from 3,493 at 2010) and it contained 1,563 housing units.

== History ==
The first settler, Thomas Henton, arrived in Washington Township in 1838 and built a cabin upon a hill.

Washington Township was organized in 1843. It was named for President George Washington.

== Geography ==
According to the 2010 census, the township has a total area of 28.38 square miles (73.5 km^{2}), of which 28.12 square miles (72.8 km^{2}) (or 99.08%) is land and 0.26 square miles (0.67 km^{2}) (or 0.92%) is water. The Wabash River defines the township's northern border.

=== Cities, towns, villages ===
- Peru (southeast quarter)

=== Unincorporated towns ===
- Park View Heights at 40.741431°N 86.049714°W
- South Peru at 40.745597°N 86.056936°W

(This list is based on USGS data and may include former settlements.)

=== Cemeteries ===
The township contains these four cemeteries: Crider, Rankin, Salem and Sharpee.

=== Major highways ===
- U.S. Route 24
- Indiana State Road 19

=== Airports and landing strips ===
- Shinn Bone Lane Airport

== School districts ==
- Maconaquah School Corporation
- Peru Community Schools

== Political districts ==
- Indiana's 5th congressional district
- State House District 23
- State House District 32
- State Senate District 18
