= Hooversburg, Indiana =

Coordinates: 40°58′59″N 86°3′39″W

Hooversburg was a community, now extinct, in Perry Township, Miami County, in the U.S. state of Indiana.

== History ==
A post office was established at Hooversburg in 1872, and remained in operation until it was discontinued in 1901. The community served as a trading point in Perry Township's early history, and was likely named after the Hoover family of settlers.
