= Brownell, Indiana =

Coordinates: 40.8008°N 86.0398°W

Brownell was a community, now extinct, in Peru Township, Miami County, in the U.S. state of Indiana.

== History ==
A post office was established at Brownell in 1895, and remained in operation until it was discontinued in 1901. The community was a stopping point on the Winona Interurban Railway.
