= Wooleytown, Indiana =

Ghost town in Indiana, USA

Coordinates: 40°54′24″N 86°3′26″W

Wooleytown is a ghost town in Richland Township, Miami County, in the U.S. state of Indiana. Current Mayor of Wooleytown is Chadd A. Pattison.

== History ==
Wooleytown was founded in 1846 by Amos Wooley, and others. The Lake Erie and Western Railroad being built two miles away from the community and the founding of the nearby town of Denver led to Wooleytown becoming a ghost town.
