= Gilead, Indiana =

- Unincorporated community
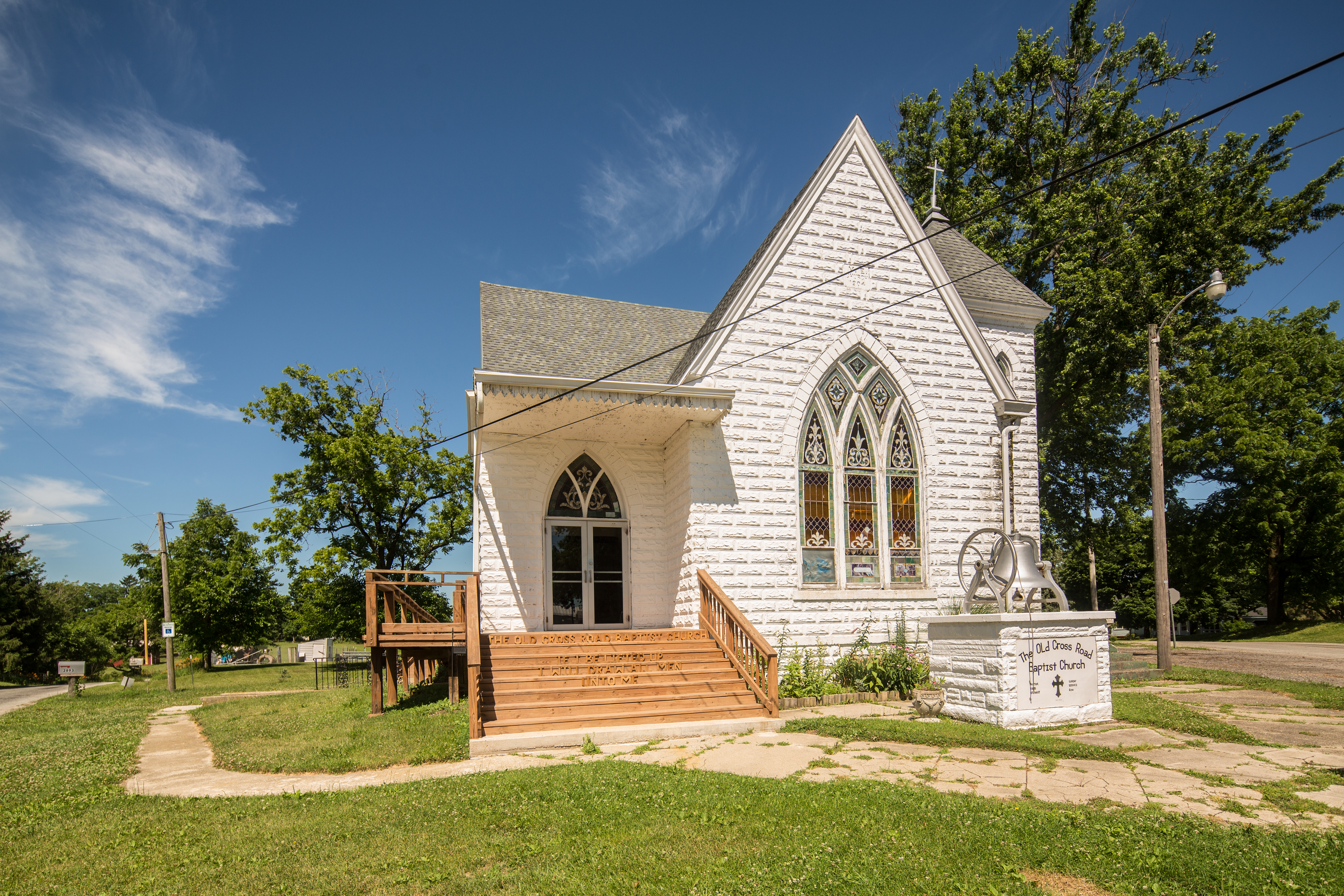

- Location within Indiana Location within the United States
- Coordinates: 40°58′13″N 86°01′07″W
- Country: United States
- State: Indiana
- County: Miami
- Township: Perry
- Elevation: 843 ft (257 m)
- Time zone: UTC-5 (Eastern (EST))
  - Summer (DST): UTC-4 (EDT)
- ZIP code: 46951
- FIPS code: 18-27648
- GNIS feature ID: 435069

Gilead is an unincorporated community in Perry Township, Miami County, in the U.S. state of Indiana.

== History ==
Gilead was platted about 1840 by Adam E. Rhodes who had settled there in 1835. It was probably named after Gilead, in the Hebrew Bible.
