= Ridgeview, Indiana =

- Unincorporated community
- Location within Indiana Location within the United States
- Coordinates: 40°45′41″N 86°04′32″W
- Country: United States
- State: Indiana
- County: Miami
- Township: Peru
- Elevation: 676 ft (206 m)
- Time zone: UTC-5 (Eastern (EST))
  - Summer (DST): UTC-4 (EDT)
- ZIP code: 46970
- GNIS feature ID: 446707

Ridgeview is an unincorporated community in Peru Township, Miami County, in the U.S. state of Indiana.

It is located within the city limits of Peru.

== History ==
Ridgeview used to be an incorporated town at one point in its history before being annexed to the city of Peru.
