= Jefferson Township, Miami County, Indiana =

Jefferson Township
- Township
- Location in Miami County
- Coordinates: 40°49′31″N 86°06′56″W
- Country: United States
- State: Indiana
- County: Miami
- Organized: June 1834
- Named for: Thomas Jefferson

Government
  - Type: Indiana township

Area
  - Total: 32.57 sq mi (84.4 km^{2})
  - Land: 32.18 sq mi (83.3 km^{2})
  - Water: 0.39 sq mi (1.0 km^{2}) 1.20%
- Elevation: 669 ft (204 m)

Population (2020)
  - Total: 2,419
  - Density: 75.17/sq mi (29.02/km^{2})
- Time zone: UTC-5 (Eastern (EST))
  - Summer (DST): UTC-4 (EDT)
- ZIP codes: 46926, 46958, 46970
- GNIS feature ID: 453490

Jefferson Township is one of fourteen townships in Miami County, Indiana, United States. As of the 2020 census, its population was 2,419 (slightly up from 2,412 at 2010) and it contained 1,029 housing units.

== History ==
Jefferson Township was organized in 1834. It is named for Thomas Jefferson, third President of the United States.

== Geography ==
According to the 2010 census, the township has a total area of 32.57 square miles (84.4 km^{2}), of which 32.18 square miles (83.3 km^{2}) (or 98.80%) is land and 0.39 square miles (1.0 km^{2}) (or 1.20%) is water.

=== Cities, towns, villages ===
- Denver
- Mexico
- Peru (west edge)

=== Unincorporated towns ===
- Courter at 40.836987°N 86.063049°W

=== Extinct towns ===
- Stringtown

=== Cemeteries ===
The township contains these five cemeteries: Courter, Eel River Chapel, Green Lawn, Koontz and Westlawn.

=== Major highways ===
- U.S. Route 31

=== Airports and landing strips ===
- Peru Municipal Airport

== School districts ==
- North Miami Community Schools

== Political districts ==
- Indiana's 5th congressional district
- State House District 23
- State House District 24
- State Senate District 18
