= Cary, Miami County, Indiana =

Coordinates: 40°35′38″N 85°56′25″W

Cary was a community, now extinct, in Harrison Township, Miami County, in the U.S. state of Indiana.

== History ==
Cary was home to a society of both Wesleyan Methodists and Quakers. The Pan Handle Railroad being built a mile away from the community and the founding of the nearby town of Amboy led to Cary becoming a ghost town.

A post office was established at Cary in 1858, and remained in operation until it was discontinued in 1868.
