= Ridgeville =

Ridgeville is the name of several communities in the United States:

- Ridgeville, Alabama
- Ridgeville, Georgia
- Ridgeville, Indiana
- Ridgeville, Ohio (unincorporated)
- Ridgeville, Michigan
- Ridgeville, South Carolina
- Ridgeville, West Virginia
- Ridgeville, Wisconsin, a town
  - Ridgeville (community), Wisconsin, an unincorporated community
- Ridgeville Township, Illinois (former)
- North Ridgeville, Ohio
