= Butler Township, Miami County, Indiana =

Butler Township
- Township
- Location in Miami County
- Coordinates: 40°42′02″N 85°58′48″W
- Country: United States
- State: Indiana
- County: Miami

Government
  - Type: Indiana township

Area
  - Total: 29.84 sq mi (77.3 km^{2})
  - Land: 28.91 sq mi (74.9 km^{2})
  - Water: 0.93 sq mi (2.4 km^{2}) 3.12%
- Elevation: 801 ft (244 m)

Population (2020)
  - Total: 826
  - Density: 28.6/sq mi (11.0/km^{2})
- Time zone: UTC-5 (Eastern (EST))
  - Summer (DST): UTC-4 (EDT)
- ZIP code: 46970
- GNIS feature ID: 453150

Butler Township is one of fourteen townships in Miami County, Indiana, United States. As of the 2020 census, its population was 826 (down from 866 at 2010) and it contained 360 housing units.

== History ==
Butler Township was organized in 1841.

The Francis Godfroy Cemetery, Wallace Circus and American Circus Corporation Winter Quarters, and Westleigh Farms are listed on the National Register of Historic Places.

== Geography ==
According to the 2010 census, the township has a total area of 29.84 square miles (77.3 km^{2}), of which 28.91 square miles (74.9 km^{2}) (or 96.88%) is land and 0.93 square miles (2.4 km^{2}) (or 3.12%) is water.

=== Unincorporated towns ===
- New Santa Fe at 40.673652°N 85.987767°W
- Peoria at 40.718653°N 85.960545°W
- Santa Fe at 40.653097°N 85.986100°W

(This list is based on USGS data and may include former settlements.)

=== Extinct towns ===
- Missisinewa at 40.750598°N 86.008324°W

(These towns are listed as "historical" by the USGS.)

=== Cemeteries ===
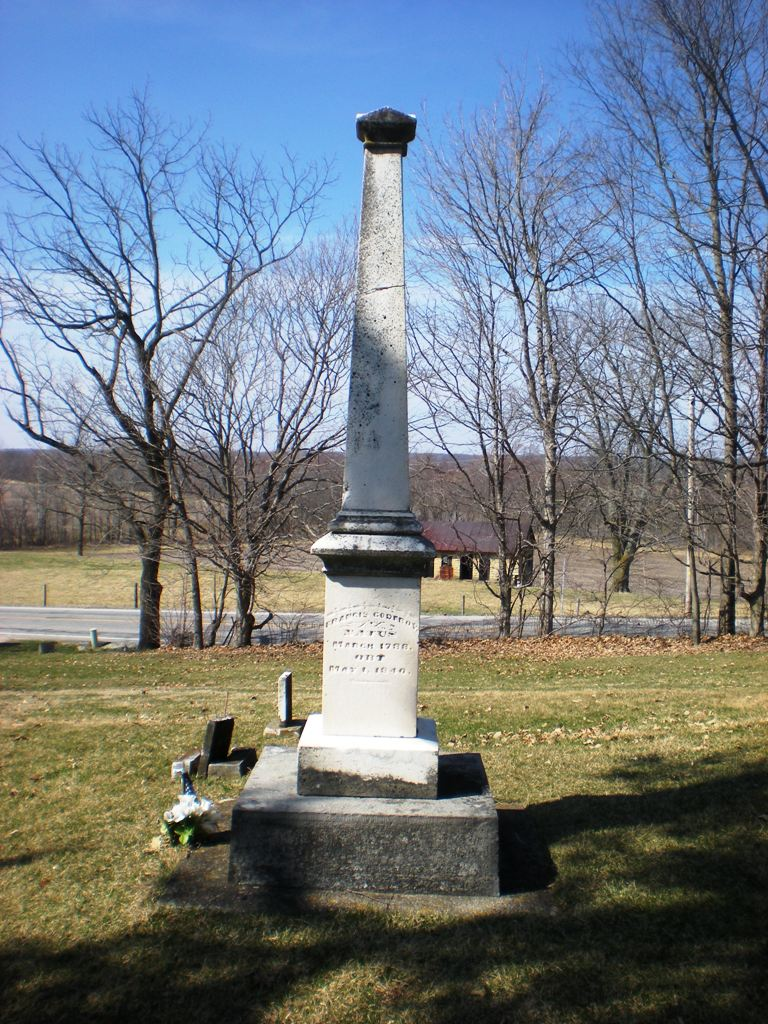
The grave of Miami Chief Francis Godfroy located at Chief Francis Godfroy Cemetery, Miami County, Indiana.

The township contains these six cemeteries: Clayton, Fegley, Francis Godfroy, Keyes, New Hope and Ramer.

=== Major highways ===
- Indiana State Road 19

=== Lakes ===
- Mississinewa Lake

== School districts ==
- Maconaquah School Corporation

== Political districts ==
- Indiana's 5th congressional district
- State House District 32
- State Senate District 18
