= Erie, Miami County, Indiana =

Erie, Indiana
- Unincorporated community
- Location within Indiana Location within the United States
- Coordinates: 40°48′04″N 85°59′29″W
- Country: United States
- State: Indiana
- County: Miami
- Township: Erie
- Elevation: 791 ft (241 m)
- Time zone: UTC-5 (Eastern (EST))
  - Summer (DST): UTC-4 (EDT)
- ZIP code: 46970
- FIPS code: 18-21400
- GNIS feature ID: 434228

Erie is an unincorporated community in Erie Township, Miami County, in the U.S. state of Indiana.

== History ==
The community took its name from Erie Township.
