= Miami County, Indiana =

County in Indiana, United States

- County
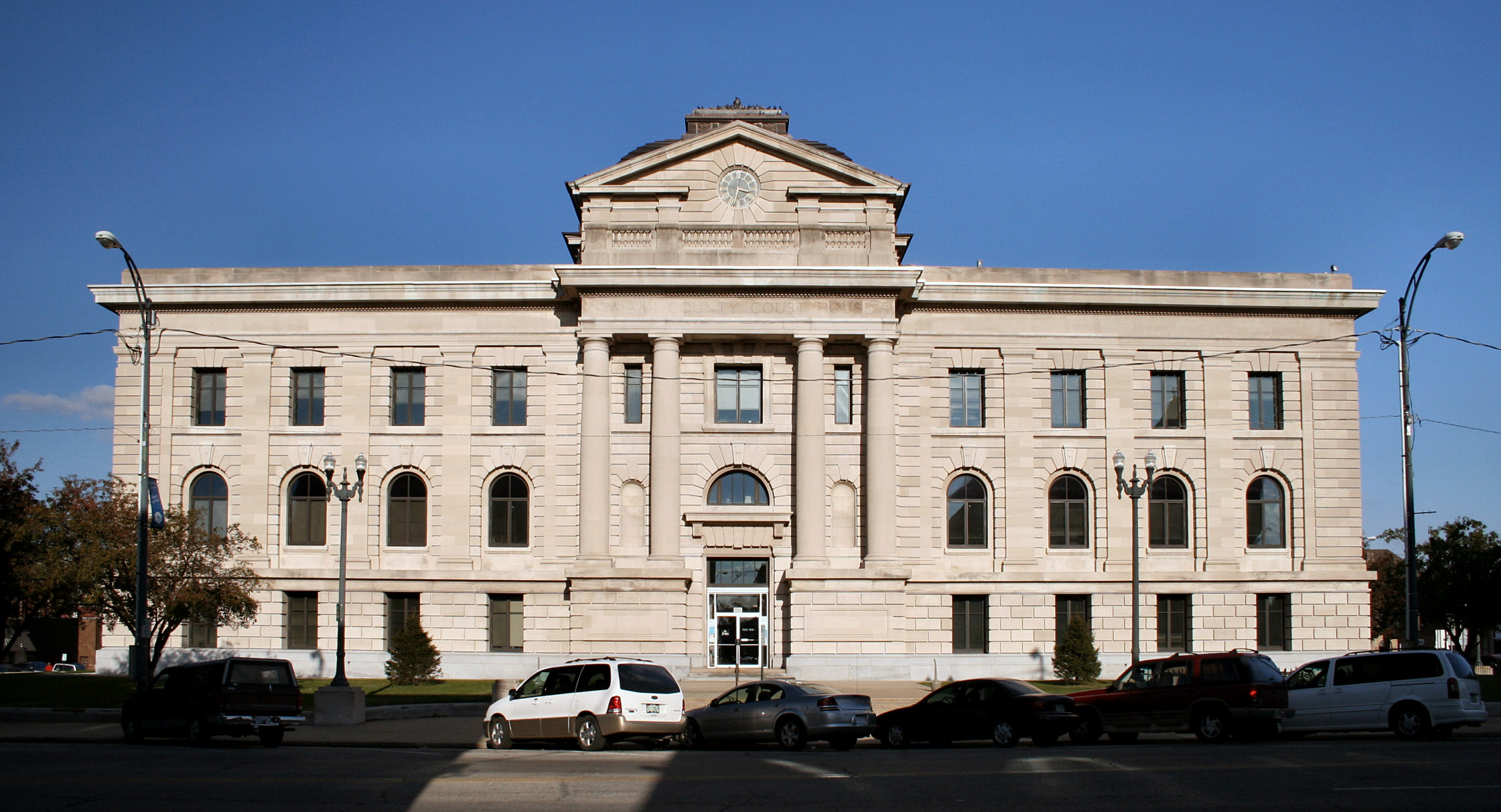
- Miami County Courthouse in Peru, Indiana

- Location within the U.S. state of Indiana
- Coordinates: 40°46′N 86°03′W
- Country: United States
- State: Indiana
- Founded: 1832
- Named for: Miami tribe
- Seat: Peru
- Largest city: Peru

Area
  - Total: 377.39 sq mi (977.4 km^{2})
  - Land: 373.84 sq mi (968.2 km^{2})
  - Water: 3.55 sq mi (9.2 km^{2}) 0.94%

Population (2020)
  - Total: 35,962
  - Estimate (2025): 34,487 ▼
  - Density: 96.196/sq mi (37.142/km^{2})
- Time zone: UTC−5 (Eastern)
  - Summer (DST): UTC−4 (EDT)
- Congressional district: 2nd
- Website: www.miamicountyin.gov
- Indiana county number 52

Miami County is a county located in the U.S. state of Indiana. As of 2020, the population was 35,962. The county seat is the City of Peru. Miami County is part of the Kokomo-Peru CSA.

== History ==
Indiana became a state on December 11, 1816, after being Indiana Territory for sixteen years. Originally, Indiana was part of the Northwest Territory, which was made up of land gained by the British after the French and Indian War and organized into a territory after the American Revolution. It was after the revolution that settlement in the area by Europeans really began. Knox territory was created in 1790 and included all of present-day Indiana and areas of Illinois. Ancestry's Red Book notes that jurisdiction in Knox territory changed due to Indian uprisings in the area from 1790 to 1810. In 1800, Indiana became the name of a territory. Parts of Michigan and Illinois both broke away from the territory before it became a state in 1816.

Miami County was formed in 1832 from Cass County and unorganized land. It was named for the Miami, a Native American people, many of whom still live in this area. In 1834, Miami County widened its western border taking some area from Cass County. In 1838 a small portion of unorganized territory was added to the northeastern border, but in 1844 that area was lost to Fulton County. Miami County has been its present shape since 1844.

== Geography ==
According to the 2010 census, the county has a total area of 377.39 square miles (977.4 km^{2}), of which 373.84 square miles (968.2 km^{2}) (or 99.06%) is land and 3.55 square miles (9.2 km^{2}) (or 0.94%) is water.

=== Adjacent counties ===
- Fulton County (north)
- Wabash County (east)
- Grant County (southeast)
- Howard County (south)
- Cass County (west)

=== Major highways ===
- U.S. Route 24
- U.S. Route 31
- State Road 16
- State Road 18
- State Road 19
- State Road 124
- State Road 218

== Communities ==
=== City ===
- Peru

=== Towns ===
- Amboy
- Bunker Hill
- Converse
- Denver
- Macy

=== Census-designated places ===
- Grissom AFB
- Mexico

=== Other unincorporated places ===
- Bennetts Switch
- Birmingham
- Chili
- Courter
- Deedsville
- Erie
- Gilead
- Loree
- McGrawsville
- Miami
- Nead
- New Santa Fe
- North Grove
- Oakdale
- Park View Heights
- Peoria
- Perrysburg
- Pettysville
- Santa Fe
- South Peru
- Stockdale
- Wawpecong
- Wells

=== Extinct ===
- Anson
- Brownell
- Busaco
- Cary
- Five Corners
- Hooversburg
- Leonda
- Niconza
- Paw Paw
- Snow Hill
- Stringtown
- Wagoner
- Wooleytown

== Townships ==
- Allen Township
- Butler Township
- Clay Township
- Deer Creek Township
- Erie Township
- Harrison Township
- Jackson Township
- Jefferson Township
- Perry Township
- Peru Township
- Pipe Creek Township
- Richland Township
- Union Township
- Washington Township

== Climate and weather ==
Peru, Indiana

Climate chart (precipitation, max. and min. temperature)
| J | F | M | A | M | J | J | A | S | O | N | D |
| 2.2 31 14 | 1.9 36 17 | 2.7 47 27 | 3.5 60 37 | 4.1 71 48 | 4.2 80 58 | 4.1 83 61 | 4 81 59 | 3.2 75 51 | 2.8 63 40 | 3.1 49 31 | 2.7 36 20 |
- █ Average max. and min. temperatures in °F
- █ Precipitation totals in inches
- Source: The Weather Channel
Metric conversion
| J | F | M | A | M | J | J | A | S | O | N | D |
| 55 −1 −10 | 48 2 −8 | 69 8 −3 | 90 16 3 | 103 22 9 | 107 27 14 | 105 28 16 | 102 27 15 | 81 24 11 | 71 17 4 | 79 9 −1 | 69 2 −7 |
- █ Average max. and min. temperatures in °C
- █ Precipitation totals in mm

In recent years, average temperatures in Peru have ranged from a low of 14 °F (−10 °C) in January to a high of 83 °F (28 °C) in July, although a record low of −24 °F (−31 °C) was recorded in January 1985 and a record high of 103 °F (39 °C) was recorded in June 1988. Average monthly precipitation ranged from 1.89 inches (48 mm) in February to 4.23 inches (107 mm) in June.

== Government ==
The county government is a constitutional body, and is granted specific powers by the Constitution of Indiana, and by the Indiana Code.

County Council: The county council is the legislative branch of the county government and controls all the spending and revenue collection in the county. Representatives are elected from county districts. The council members serve four-year terms. They are responsible for setting salaries, the annual budget, and special spending. The council also has limited authority to impose local taxes, in the form of an income and property tax that is subject to state level approval, excise taxes, and service taxes.

Board of Commissioners: The executive body of the county is made of a board of commissioners. The commissioners are elected county-wide, in staggered terms, and each serves a four-year term. One of the commissioners, typically the most senior, serves as president. The commissioners are charged with executing the acts legislated by the council, collecting revenue, and managing the day-to-day functions of the county government.

Court: The county maintains a small claims court that can handle some civil cases. The judge on the court is elected to a term of four years and must be a member of the Indiana Bar Association. The judge is assisted by a constable who is also elected to a four-year term. In some cases, court decisions can be appealed to the state level circuit court.

County Officials: The county has several other elected offices, including sheriff, coroner, auditor, treasurer, recorder, surveyor, and circuit court clerk Each of these elected officers serves a term of four years and oversees a different part of county government. Members elected to county government positions are required to declare party affiliations and to be residents of the county.

Miami County is part of Indiana's 2nd congressional district; Indiana Senate district 18; and Indiana House of Representatives districts 23, 24 and 32.

United States presidential election results for Miami County, Indiana
| Year | Republican | | Democratic | | Third party(ies) | |
| Year | No. | % | No. | % | No. | % |
|---|---|---|---|---|---|---|
| 1888 | 3,042 | 45.30% | 3,492 | 52.00% | 181 | 2.70% |
| 1892 | 2,974 | 44.30% | 3,433 | 51.13% | 307 | 4.57% |
| 1896 | 3,393 | 47.52% | 3,602 | 50.45% | 145 | 2.03% |
| 1900 | 3,812 | 48.23% | 3,849 | 48.70% | 243 | 3.07% |
| 1904 | 4,124 | 49.53% | 3,605 | 43.29% | 598 | 7.18% |
| 1908 | 3,820 | 45.26% | 4,176 | 49.48% | 444 | 5.26% |
| 1912 | 1,426 | 19.03% | 3,366 | 44.92% | 2,702 | 36.06% |
| 1916 | 3,390 | 43.16% | 3,854 | 49.07% | 610 | 7.77% |
| 1920 | 7,336 | 51.94% | 6,259 | 44.31% | 529 | 3.75% |
| 1924 | 6,796 | 51.49% | 4,976 | 37.70% | 1,427 | 10.81% |
| 1928 | 8,318 | 59.19% | 5,592 | 39.80% | 142 | 1.01% |
| 1932 | 5,987 | 39.41% | 8,892 | 58.53% | 312 | 2.05% |
| 1936 | 6,747 | 44.62% | 8,173 | 54.05% | 202 | 1.34% |
| 1940 | 8,217 | 52.76% | 7,252 | 46.56% | 106 | 0.68% |
| 1944 | 8,207 | 55.54% | 6,379 | 43.17% | 191 | 1.29% |
| 1948 | 7,083 | 51.09% | 6,538 | 47.16% | 242 | 1.75% |
| 1952 | 9,254 | 58.97% | 6,264 | 39.91% | 176 | 1.12% |
| 1956 | 9,574 | 62.28% | 5,724 | 37.24% | 74 | 0.48% |
| 1960 | 8,844 | 58.45% | 6,191 | 40.92% | 96 | 0.63% |
| 1964 | 6,270 | 44.59% | 7,667 | 54.53% | 123 | 0.87% |
| 1968 | 7,295 | 53.42% | 5,019 | 36.76% | 1,341 | 9.82% |
| 1972 | 9,477 | 70.46% | 3,889 | 28.91% | 84 | 0.62% |
| 1976 | 8,263 | 54.52% | 6,257 | 41.29% | 635 | 4.19% |
| 1980 | 8,672 | 60.63% | 4,927 | 34.44% | 705 | 4.93% |
| 1984 | 9,551 | 68.75% | 4,224 | 30.41% | 117 | 0.84% |
| 1988 | 8,533 | 64.47% | 4,613 | 34.85% | 90 | 0.68% |
| 1992 | 6,416 | 46.10% | 3,967 | 28.50% | 3,535 | 25.40% |
| 1996 | 6,719 | 52.66% | 4,260 | 33.39% | 1,781 | 13.96% |
| 2000 | 8,401 | 64.98% | 4,155 | 32.14% | 372 | 2.88% |
| 2004 | 9,600 | 70.44% | 3,886 | 28.51% | 142 | 1.04% |
| 2008 | 8,312 | 58.72% | 5,564 | 39.30% | 280 | 1.98% |
| 2012 | 8,174 | 63.79% | 4,222 | 32.95% | 417 | 3.25% |
| 2016 | 9,975 | 73.34% | 2,766 | 20.34% | 860 | 6.32% |
| 2020 | 10,925 | 75.38% | 3,235 | 22.32% | 333 | 2.30% |
| 2024 | 10,670 | 76.23% | 3,046 | 21.76% | 282 | 2.01% |

== Demographics ==
Historical population
| Census | Pop. | Note | %± |
|---|---|---|---|
| 1840 | 3,048 | | — |
| 1850 | 11,304 | | 270.9% |
| 1860 | 16,851 | | 49.1% |
| 1870 | 21,052 | | 24.9% |
| 1880 | 24,083 | | 14.4% |
| 1890 | 25,823 | | 7.2% |
| 1900 | 28,344 | | 9.8% |
| 1910 | 29,350 | | 3.5% |
| 1920 | 28,668 | | −2.3% |
| 1930 | 29,032 | | 1.3% |
| 1940 | 27,926 | | −3.8% |
| 1950 | 28,201 | | 1.0% |
| 1960 | 38,000 | | 34.7% |
| 1970 | 39,246 | | 3.3% |
| 1980 | 39,820 | | 1.5% |
| 1990 | 36,897 | | −7.3% |
| 2000 | 36,082 | | −2.2% |
| 2010 | 36,903 | | 2.3% |
| 2020 | 35,962 | | −2.5% |
| 2025 (est.) | 34,487 | ▼ | −4.1% |
U.S. Decennial Census; 1790-1960 1900-1990; 1990-2000 2010-2013

=== Racial and ethnic composition ===
Miami County, Indiana – Racial and ethnic composition Note: the US Census treats Hispanic/Latino as an ethnic category. This table excludes Latinos from the racial categories and assigns them to a separate category. Hispanics/Latinos may be of any race.
| Race / Ethnicity (NH = Non-Hispanic) | Pop 1980 | Pop 1990 | Pop 2000 | Pop 2010 | Pop 2020 | % 1980 | % 1990 | % 2000 | % 2010 | % 2020 |
|---|---|---|---|---|---|---|---|---|---|---|
| White alone (NH) | 37,621 | 34,467 | 33,560 | 33,307 | 31,123 | 94.48% | 93.41% | 93.01% | 90.26% | 86.54% |
| Black or African American alone (NH) | 1,079 | 1,089 | 1,066 | 1,649 | 1,792 | 2.71% | 2.95% | 2.95% | 4.47% | 4.98% |
| Native American or Alaska Native alone (NH) | 377 | 555 | 375 | 309 | 281 | 0.95% | 1.50% | 1.04% | 0.84% | 0.78% |
| Asian alone (NH) | 172 | 220 | 115 | 128 | 130 | 0.43% | 0.60% | 0.32% | 0.35% | 0.36% |
| Native Hawaiian or Pacific Islander alone (NH) | x | x | 4 | 8 | 4 | x | x | 0.01% | 0.02% | 0.01% |
| Other race alone (NH) | 108 | 22 | 25 | 24 | 102 | 0.27% | 0.06% | 0.07% | 0.07% | 0.28% |
| Mixed race or Multiracial (NH) | x | x | 459 | 572 | 1,344 | x | x | 1.27% | 1.55% | 3.74% |
| Hispanic or Latino (any race) | 463 | 544 | 478 | 906 | 1,186 | 1.16% | 1.47% | 1.32% | 2.46% | 3.30% |
| Total | 39,820 | 36,897 | 36,082 | 36,903 | 35,962 | 100.00% | 100.00% | 100.00% | 100.00% | 100.00% |

=== 2020 census ===
As of the 2020 census, the county had a population of 35,962. The median age was 40.4 years. 21.8% of residents were under the age of 18 and 17.4% of residents were 65 years of age or older. For every 100 females there were 115.7 males, and for every 100 females age 18 and over there were 118.9 males age 18 and over.

The racial makeup of the county was 87.6% White, 5.0% Black or African American, 0.9% American Indian and Alaska Native, 0.4% Asian, <0.1% Native Hawaiian and Pacific Islander, 1.5% from some other race, and 4.6% from two or more races. Hispanic or Latino residents of any race comprised 3.3% of the population.

54.4% of residents lived in urban areas, while 45.6% lived in rural areas.

There were 13,348 households in the county, of which 29.9% had children under the age of 18 living in them. Of all households, 49.4% were married-couple households, 18.2% were households with a male householder and no spouse or partner present, and 25.1% were households with a female householder and no spouse or partner present. About 27.9% of all households were made up of individuals and 12.9% had someone living alone who was 65 years of age or older.

There were 14,852 housing units, of which 10.1% were vacant. Among occupied housing units, 72.0% were owner-occupied and 28.0% were renter-occupied. The homeowner vacancy rate was 1.7% and the rental vacancy rate was 13.0%.

=== 2010 census ===
As of the 2010 United States census, there were 36,903 people, 13,456 households, and 9,330 families residing in the county. The population density was 98.7 inhabitants per square mile (38.1/km^{2}). There were 15,479 housing units at an average density of 41.4 per square mile (16.0/km^{2}). The racial makeup of the county was 91.8% white, 4.5% black or African American, 0.9% American Indian, 0.3% Asian, 0.6% from other races, and 1.8% from two or more races. Those of Hispanic or Latino origin made up 2.5% of the population. In terms of ancestry, 27.2% were German, 17.3% were American, 12.0% were Irish, and 8.4% were English.

Of the 13,456 households, 32.5% had children under the age of 18 living with them, 53.2% were married couples living together, 11.3% had a female householder with no husband present, 30.7% were non-families, and 26.2% of all households were made up of individuals. The average household size was 2.49 and the average family size was 2.97. The median age was 39.5 years.

The median income for a household in the county was $47,697 and the median income for a family was $49,282. Males had a median income of $40,038 versus $26,011 for females. The per capita income for the county was $18,854. About 13.0% of families and 16.7% of the population were below the poverty line, including 26.6% of those under age 18 and 8.9% of those age 65 or over.

Major employers of Miami County include:
Ferrellgas (Peru )
Schneider Electric Square D (Peru ) (Closed)
Miami Correctional Facility (Bunker Hill )
Indiana Correction Dept (Bunker Hill )
Armour-Eckrich Meats (Peru )
American Stationery Co (Peru ) http://www.americanstationery.com
Dukes Memorial Hospital (Peru ) http://www.dukesmemorialhosp.com
Miami County (Peru )
Bryan Steam LLC (Peru ) http://www.bryanboilers.com
Snavely Machine & Mfg Co Inc (Peru )

== See also ==
- National Register of Historic Places listings in Miami County, Indiana
