= Perrysburg, Indiana =

- Unincorporated community
- Location within Indiana Location within the United States
- Coordinates: 40°53′52″N 86°08′58″W
- Country: United States
- State: Indiana
- County: Miami
- Township: Union
- Elevation: 830 ft (250 m)
- Time zone: UTC-5 (Eastern (EST))
  - Summer (DST): UTC-4 (EDT)
- ZIP code: 46951/46926
- GNIS feature ID: 449708

Perrysburg is an unincorporated community in Union Township, Miami County, in the U.S. state of Indiana.

== History ==
Perrysburg was platted in 1837 by John R. Wilkinson and Matthew Fenimore. Two years later, Perrysburg contained a half a dozen residences, a tavern, a store, a blacksmith shop, and a church. When the Lake Erie and Western Railroad was built in Miami County, it was not extended to Perrysburg, and the town declined.

A post office was established at Perrysburg in 1838, and remained in operation until it was discontinued in 1907.
