= Miami, Indiana =

- Census-designated place
- Location within Indiana Location within the United States
- Coordinates: 40°36′51″N 86°06′24″W
- Country: United States
- State: Indiana
- County: Miami
- Township: Deer Creek

Area
  - Total: 0.17 sq mi (0.44 km^{2})
  - Land: 0.17 sq mi (0.44 km^{2})
  - Water: 0.0 sq mi (0 km^{2})
- Elevation: 794 ft (242 m)
- Time zone: UTC-5 (Eastern (EST))
  - Summer (DST): UTC-4 (EDT)
- ZIP code: 46959
- FIPS code: 18-48672
- GNIS feature ID: 2830465

Miami is an unincorporated community and census-designated place (CDP) in Deer Creek Township, Miami County, in the U.S. state of Indiana.

== History ==
Miami was founded by Isaac Herrell and platted in 1849 by Isaac's brother James. Their other brother Austin started the first church and school in his home. James' son Beecher opened the first grocery store. The community took its name from Miami County.

== Geography ==
Miami is located in southwestern Miami County and is 1 mile (1.6 km) east of U.S. Route 31, 11 miles (18 km) south of Peru, the county seat, and 9 miles (14 km) north of Kokomo.

According to the U.S. Census Bureau, the Miami CDP has an area of 0.165 square miles (0.43 km^{2}), all land. Deer Creek runs along the southern edge of the community, flowing west to the Wabash River at Delphi.

== Demographics ==
The United States Census Bureau defined Miami as a census designated place in the 2022 American Community Survey.
