= Nead, Indiana =

- Unincorporated community
- Location within Indiana Location within the United States
- Coordinates: 40°42′26″N 86°07′39″W
- Country: United States
- State: Indiana
- County: Miami
- Township: Pipe Creek
- Elevation: 768 ft (234 m)
- Time zone: UTC-5 (Eastern (EST))
  - Summer (DST): UTC-4 (EDT)
- ZIP code: 46970
- FIPS code: 18-52110
- GNIS feature ID: 439955

Nead is an unincorporated community in Pipe Creek Township, Miami County, in the U.S. state of Indiana.

== History ==
A post office was established at Nead in 1894, and remained in operation until 1901. The community was probably named for Samuel Nead, a local resident.

Nead was not officially platted. By 1914, Nead contained a public school and a general store, and around 40 inhabitants.
