= Courter, Indiana =

- Unincorporated community
- Location within Indiana Location within the United States
- Coordinates: 40°50′13″N 86°03′47″W
- Country: United States
- State: Indiana
- County: Miami
- Township: Jefferson
- Elevation: 745 ft (227 m)
- Time zone: UTC-5 (Eastern (EST))
  - Summer (DST): UTC-4 (EDT)
- ZIP code: 46970
- FIPS code: 18-15436
- GNIS feature ID: 433045

Courter is an unincorporated community in Jefferson Township, Miami County, in the U.S. state of Indiana.

== History ==
Courter was platted in 1869 by R. F. Donaldson. The community was named after the Courter family of settlers.

Courter had a depot on the Lake Erie and Western Railroad. At one time, the town contained a general store, a blacksmith shop, and a public school. A post office was established at Courter in 1869, and remained in operation until it was discontinued in 1896.
