= Ridgeview, Durban =

Ridgeview
- Location within KwaZulu-Natal Location within South Africa
- Coordinates: 29.8674°S 30.9443°E
- Country: South Africa
- Province: KwaZulu-Natal
- Municipality: eThekwini

Area
  - Total: 2.98 km^{2} (1.15 sq mi)

Population (2011)
  - Total: 6,857
  - Density: 2,300/km^{2} (5,960/sq mi)

Racial makeup (2011)
  - Black African: 99.0%
  - Coloured: 0.55%
  - Indian/Asian: 0.15%
  - White: 0.1%
  - Other: 0.2%

First languages (2011)
  - Zulu: 86.0%
  - Xhosa: 5.25%
  - English: 3.85%
  - Other: 4.9%
- Time zone: UTC+2 (SAST)
- Postal code (street): n/a
- PO box: 4138

Ridgeview is a residential area in central Durban, KwaZulu-Natal, South Africa.
