= North Grove, Indiana =

- Census-designated place
- Location within Indiana Location within the United States
- Coordinates: 40°36′47″N 85°57′55″W
- Country: United States
- State: Indiana
- County: Miami
- Township: Harrison

Area
  - Total: 0.13 sq mi (0.34 km^{2})
  - Land: 0.13 sq mi (0.34 km^{2})
  - Water: 0.0 sq mi (0 km^{2})
- Elevation: 824 ft (251 m)
- Time zone: UTC-5 (Eastern (EST))
  - Summer (DST): UTC-4 (EDT)
- ZIP code: 46911 (Amboy)
- FIPS code: 18-54792
- GNIS feature ID: 2830466

North Grove is an unincorporated community and census-designated place (CDP) in Harrison Township, Miami County, in the U.S. state of Indiana.

== History ==
North Grove was originally called "Moorefield" when it was laid out in 1854 by William North. The name was changed to "North Grove" at about the time the Pan Handle Railroad arrived in the town in 1867. A post office was established at North Grove in 1868, and remained in operation until it was discontinued in 1934.

== Geography ==
North Grove is located in southeastern Miami County. Indiana State Road 19 passes the northeast border of the CDP, leading northwest 12 miles (19 km) to Peru, the county seat, and southeast 2.5 miles (4.0 km) to Amboy. Kokomo is 16 miles (26 km) to the southwest.

According to the U.S. Census Bureau, the North Grove CDP has an area of 0.13 square miles (0.34 km^{2}), all land. Walnut Creek runs along the eastern edge of the community, leading north to Pipe Creek, which flows northwest to the Wabash River at Lewisburg.

== Demographics ==
The United States Census Bureau defined North Grove as a census designated place in the 2022 American Community Survey.
