= Clay Township, Miami County, Indiana =

Clay Township
- Township
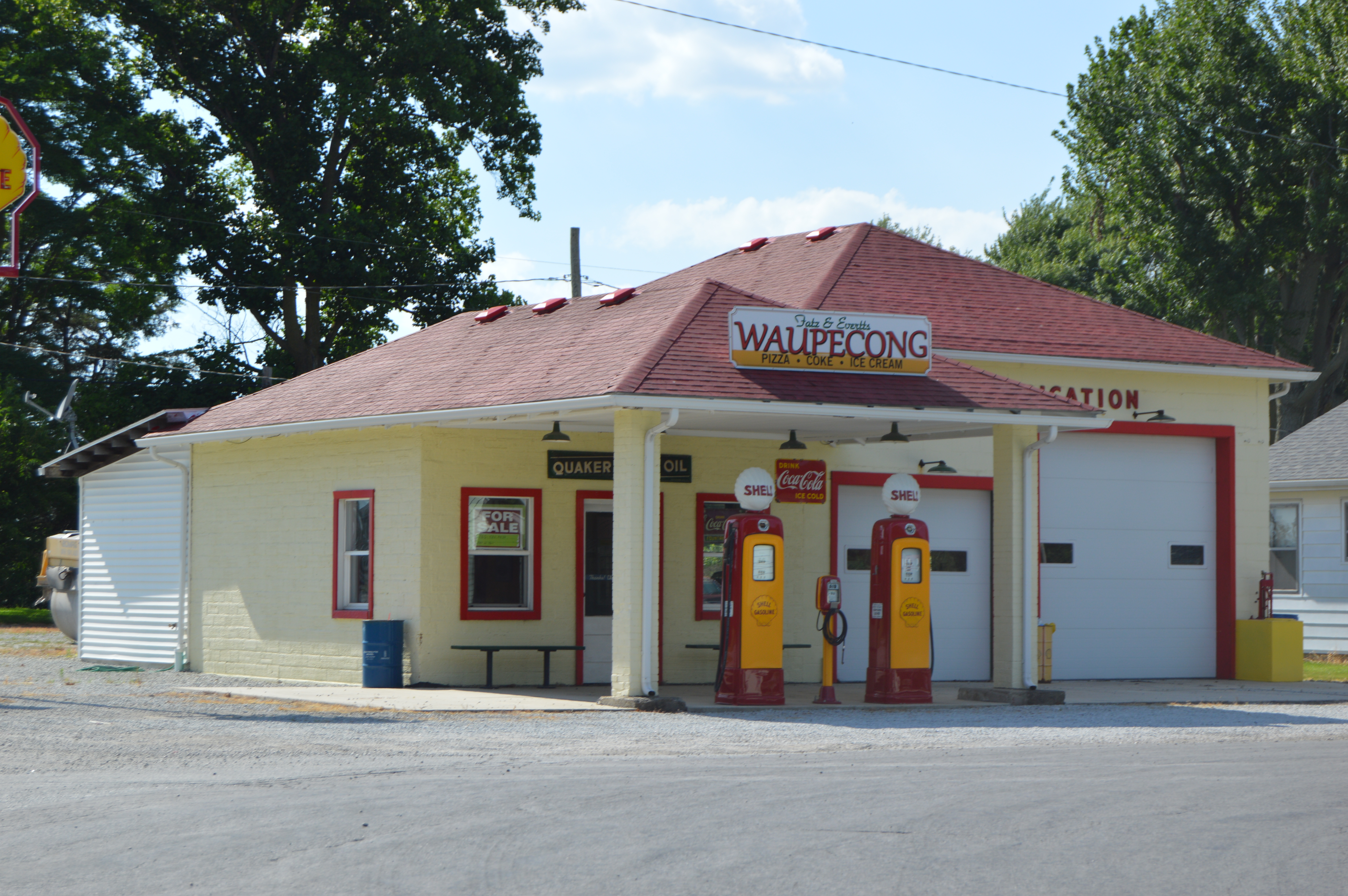
- Former Shell station in Wawpecong

- Location in Miami County
- Coordinates: 40°36′20″N 86°03′02″W
- Country: United States
- State: Indiana
- County: Miami
- Organized: 1846
- Named for: Henry Clay

Government
  - Type: Indiana township

Area
  - Total: 23.91 sq mi (61.9 km^{2})
  - Land: 23.89 sq mi (61.9 km^{2})
  - Water: 0.02 sq mi (0.052 km^{2}) 0.08%
- Elevation: 817 ft (249 m)

Population (2020)
  - Total: 889
  - Density: 37.2/sq mi (14.4/km^{2})
- Time zone: UTC-5 (Eastern (EST))
  - Summer (DST): UTC-4 (EDT)
- ZIP codes: 46901, 46911, 46914, 46970
- GNIS feature ID: 453214

Clay Township is one of fourteen townships in Miami County, Indiana, United States. As of the 2020 census, its population was 889 (down from 844 at 2010) and it contained 354 housing units.

== History ==
Clay Township was organized in 1846. It is named for statesman Henry Clay of Kentucky.

== Geography ==
According to the 2010 census, the township has a total area of 23.91 square miles (61.9 km^{2}), of which 23.89 square miles (61.9 km^{2}) (or 99.92%) is land and 0.02 square miles (0.052 km^{2}) (or 0.08%) is water.

=== Unincorporated towns ===
- Loree at 40.645596°N 86.0580467°W
- Wawpecong at 40.5783728°N 86.0422123°W

=== Cemeteries ===
The township contains Climer Cemetery.

=== Major highways ===
- Indiana State Road 18

== School districts ==
- Maconaquah School Corporation

== Political districts ==
- Indiana's 5th congressional district
- State House District 32
- State Senate District 18
