= Santa Fe, Miami County, Indiana =

Santa Fe, Indiana
- Unincorporated community
- Location within Indiana Location within the United States
- Coordinates: 40°39′11″N 85°59′10″W
- Country: United States
- State: Indiana
- County: Miami
- Township: Butler
- Elevation: 787 ft (240 m)
- Time zone: UTC-5 (Eastern (EST))
  - Summer (DST): UTC-4 (EDT)
- ZIP code: 46970
- FIPS code: 18-68040
- GNIS feature ID: 443023

Santa Fe is an unincorporated community in Butler Township, Miami County, in the U.S. state of Indiana. It is located at the intersections of State Roads 19 and 218, about 9 miles south of Peru.

== History ==
Santa Fe was laid out in 1848. The community's name probably commemorates the Capture of Santa Fe in the Mexican–American War. A post office was established at Santa Fe in 1849, and remained in operation until 1917. The town is one of likely explanations for the town of same name in Spencer County becoming Santa Claus.
