= Macy, Indiana =

- Town
- Location in Miami County, Indiana
- Coordinates: 40°57′26″N 86°07′35″W
- Country: United States
- State: Indiana
- County: Miami
- Township: Allen

Area
  - Total: 0.12 sq mi (0.30 km^{2})
  - Land: 0.12 sq mi (0.30 km^{2})
  - Water: 0 sq mi (0.00 km^{2})
- Elevation: 850 ft (260 m)

Population (2020)
  - Total: 199
  - Density: 1,736.1/sq mi (670.32/km^{2})
- Time zone: UTC-5 (Eastern (EST))
  - Summer (DST): UTC-4 (EDT)
- ZIP code: 46951
- Area code: 574
- FIPS code: 18-45864
- GNIS feature ID: 2396733

Macy is a town in Allen Township, Miami County, in the U.S. state of Indiana. The population was 199 at the 2020 census.

== History ==
Macy was laid out in 1860 at the time the railroad arrived in the neighborhood. The community was originally known as "Lincoln", but when it was discovered that there was already another Lincoln in Cass County, the name was changed in order to prevent confusion in the mail system. The namesake of Macy was David Macy, president of the Indianapolis, Peru and Chicago Railway. The post office at Macy has been in operation since 1880.

== Geography ==
Macy is located in northern Miami County 15 miles (24 km) north-northwest of Peru, the county seat, and 9 miles (14 km) southeast of Rochester.

According to the U.S. Census Bureau, Macy has a total area of 0.12 square miles (0.31 km^{2}), all land.

== Demographics ==
Historical population
Census	Pop.	Note	%±
1880	290		—
1890	316		9.0%
1900	314		−0.6%
1910	320		1.9%
1920	297		−7.2%
1930	279		−6.1%
1940	275		−1.4%
1950	288		4.7%
1960	328		13.9%
1970	273		−16.8%
1980	282		3.3%
1990	218		−22.7%
2000	248		13.8%
2010	209		−15.7%
2020	199		−4.8%
U.S. Decennial Census

=== 2010 census ===
As of the census of 2010, there were 209 people, 76 households, and 57 families living in the town. The population density was 1,607.7 inhabitants per square mile (620.7/km^{2}). There were 88 housing units at an average density of 676.9 per square mile (261.4/km^{2}). The racial makeup of the town was 98.1% White, 0.5% African American, 0.5% Native American, and 1.0% from two or more races.

There were 76 households, of which 32.9% had children under the age of 18 living with them, 51.3% were married couples living together, 13.2% had a female householder with no husband present, 10.5% had a male householder with no wife present, and 25.0% were non-families. 17.1% of all households were made up of individuals, and 7.9% had someone living alone who was 65 years of age or older. The average household size was 2.75 and the average family size was 3.05.

The median age in the town was 39.6 years. 25.4% of residents were under the age of 18; 7.1% were between the ages of 18 and 24; 23.5% were from 25 to 44; 29.2% were from 45 to 64; and 14.8% were 65 years of age or older. The gender makeup of the town was 50.2% male and 49.8% female.

=== 2000 census ===
As of the census of 2000, there were 248 people, 82 households, and 62 families living in the town. The population density was 1,755.5 inhabitants per square mile (677.8/km^{2}). There were 94 housing units at an average density of 665.4 per square mile (256.9/km^{2}). The racial makeup of the town was 97.18% White, 0.40% Native American, 0.40% Asian, 0.40% from other races, and 1.61% from two or more races. Hispanic or Latino of any race were 1.61% of the population.

There were 82 households, out of which 42.7% had children under the age of 18 living with them, 61.0% were married couples living together, 9.8% had a female householder with no husband present, and 23.2% were non-families. 18.3% of all households were made up of individuals, and 7.3% had someone living alone who was 65 years of age or older. The average household size was 3.02 and the average family size was 3.51.

In the town, the population was spread out, with 33.9% under the age of 18, 7.3% from 18 to 24, 34.3% from 25 to 44, 14.1% from 45 to 64, and 10.5% who were 65 years of age or older. The median age was 31 years. For every 100 females, there were 115.7 males. For every 100 females age 18 and over, there were 110.3 males.

The median income for an average household in the town was $37,188, and the median income for a family was $41,667. Males had a median income of $32,321 versus $15,750 for females. The per capita income for the town was $14,692. None of the families and 2.6% of the population were living below the poverty line.

== Notable persons ==
- Ruth Riley, basketball player with the Detroit Shock of the WNBA
- The Lane Sisters, actresses and singers; two of the four were born in Macy
