= Peru Township, Miami County, Indiana =

Peru Township
- Township
- Location in Miami County
- Coordinates: 40°46′25″N 86°05′14″W
- Country: United States
- State: Indiana
- County: Miami

Government
  - Type: Indiana township

Area
  - Total: 25.48 sq mi (66.0 km^{2})
  - Land: 25.01 sq mi (64.8 km^{2})
  - Water: 0.48 sq mi (1.2 km^{2}) 1.88%
- Elevation: 673 ft (205 m)

Population (2020)
  - Total: 10,638
  - Density: 425.3/sq mi (164.2/km^{2})
- Time zone: UTC-5 (Eastern (EST))
  - Summer (DST): UTC-4 (EDT)
- ZIP code: 46970
- GNIS feature ID: 453729

Peru Township is one of fourteen townships in Miami County, Indiana, United States. As of the 2020 census, its population was 10,638 and it contained 5,195 housing units.

== History ==
Peru Township was organized in 1834.

== Geography ==
According to the 2010 census, the township has a total area of 25.48 square miles (66.0 km^{2}), of which 25.01 square miles (64.8 km^{2}) (or 98.16%) is land and 0.48 square miles (1.2 km^{2}) (or 1.88%) is water. The Wabash River defines the southern border of the township.

=== Cities, towns, villages ===
- Peru (northwest three-quarters)

=== Unincorporated towns ===
- Oakdale at 40.768375°N 86.053603°W
- Ridgeview at 40.761431°N 86.075548°W

(This list is based on USGS data and may include former settlements.)

=== Extinct towns ===
- Brownell

=== Cemeteries ===
The township contains these three cemeteries: Bowman, Mount Hope and Schrock.

=== Major highways ===
- U.S. Route 24
- U.S. Route 31

=== Airports and landing strips ===
- Benner Field

== School districts ==
- Peru Community Schools

== Political districts ==
- Indiana's 5th congressional district
- State House District 23
- State Senate District 18
