= Leonda, Indiana =

Abandoned community in Indiana, U.S.

Coordinates: 40°40′41″N 86°6′10″W

Leonda was a community, now extinct, in Pipe Creek Township, Miami County, in the U.S. state of Indiana.

== History ==
Leonda was laid out in 1851 by Jacob Pottarff and Harvey Hoover. In its heyday, the town had a post office, a general store, and a hotel. When the Pan Handle Railroad was built in Miami County, it was not extended to Leonda, being built through nearby Bunker Hill instead. This led to Leonda becoming a ghost town.

A post office was established at Leonda in 1852, and remained in operation until it was discontinued in 1860.
