= Chili, Indiana =

- Census-designated place
- Location within Indiana Location within the United States
- Coordinates: 40°51′44″N 86°01′40″W
- Country: United States
- State: Indiana
- County: Miami
- Township: Richland

Area
  - Total: 0.209 sq mi (0.54 km^{2})
  - Land: 0.203 sq mi (0.53 km^{2})
  - Water: 0.006 sq mi (0.016 km^{2})
- Elevation: 709 ft (216 m)
- Time zone: UTC-5 (Eastern (EST))
  - Summer (DST): UTC-4 (EDT)
- ZIP code: 46926
- GNIS feature ID: 2830464

Chili (Cheye-leye) is an unincorporated community and census-designated place in Richland Township, Miami County, in the U.S. state of Indiana.

== History ==
Chili, originally called "New Market", was surveyed in 1839. In 1886, the Peru and Detroit Railway was extended to Chili.

A post office was established at Chili in 1843, and remained in operation until it was discontinued in 1961.

== Geography ==
Chili is located in northern Miami County, on the north bank of the Eel River, a west-flowing tributary of the Wabash River. Indiana State Road 19 passes through the center of the town, leading south 8 miles (13 km) to Peru, the Miami county seat, and north 13 miles (21 km) to Akron. State Road 16 intersect SR 19 at the northern edge of Chili, leading west 2.5 miles (4.0 km) to Denver.

According to the U.S. Census Bureau, the Chili CDP has a total area of 0.21 square miles (0.54 km^{2}), of which 0.006 square miles (0.016 km^{2}), or 2.87%, are water.

== Demographics ==
The United States Census Bureau delineated Chili as a census designated place in the 2022 American Community Survey.
