= Allen Township, Miami County, Indiana =

Allen Township
- Township
- Location in Miami County
- Coordinates: 40°57′58″N 86°07′04″W
- Country: United States
- State: Indiana
- County: Miami
- Organized: 1859
- Named for: William Allen

Government
  - Type: Indiana township

Area
  - Total: 21.62 sq mi (56.0 km^{2})
  - Land: 21.51 sq mi (55.7 km^{2})
  - Water: 0.11 sq mi (0.28 km^{2}) 0.51%
- Elevation: 837 ft (255 m)

Population (2020)
  - Total: 642
  - Density: 29.8/sq mi (11.5/km^{2})
- Time zone: UTC-5 (Eastern (EST))
  - Summer (DST): UTC-4 (EDT)
- ZIP codes: 46910, 46951
- GNIS feature ID: 453085

Allen Township is one of fourteen townships in Miami County, Indiana, United States. As of the 2020 census, its population was 642 (down from 695 at 2010) and it contained 258 housing units.

== History ==
Allen Township was organized in 1859.

== Geography ==
According to the 2010 census, the township has a total area of 21.62 square miles (56.0 km^{2}), of which 21.51 square miles (55.7 km^{2}) (or 99.49%) is land and 0.11 square miles (0.28 km^{2}) (or 0.51%) is water.

=== Cities, towns, villages ===
- Macy

=== Unincorporated towns ===
- Birmingham at 40.9378201°N 86.1094398°W

(This list is based on USGS data and may include former settlements.)

=== Extinct towns ===
- Wagoner at 40.9895°N 86.149°W

(These towns are listed as "historical" by the USGS.)

=== Cemeteries ===
The township contains these two cemeteries: Five Corners and Plainview.

=== Major highways ===
- U.S. Route 31

=== Landmarks ===
- 5 Corners Cemetery
- Plainview Cemetery

== School districts ==
- North Miami Community Schools

== Political districts ==
- Indiana's 5th congressional district
- State House District 23
- State Senate District 18
