= Richland Township, Miami County, Indiana =

Richland Township
- Township
- Location in Miami County
- Coordinates: 40°52′19″N 86°00′26″W
- Country: United States
- State: Indiana
- County: Miami
- Organized: 6 November 1837

Government
  - Type: Indiana township

Area
  - Total: 40.16 sq mi (104.0 km^{2})
  - Land: 39.65 sq mi (102.7 km^{2})
  - Water: 0.5 sq mi (1.3 km^{2}) 1.25%
- Elevation: 741 ft (226 m)

Population (2020)
  - Total: 1,108
  - Density: 27.94/sq mi (10.79/km^{2})
- Time zone: UTC-5 (Eastern (EST))
  - Summer (DST): UTC-4 (EDT)
- ZIP codes: 46926, 46970, 46974
- GNIS feature ID: 453797

Richland Township is one of fourteen townships in Miami County, Indiana, United States. As of the 2020 census, its population was 1,108 (down from 1,179 at 2010) and it contained 470 housing units.

== History ==
Richland Township was organized in 1837. The township was so named on account of their fertile soil.

The Eikenberry Bridge was listed on the National Register of Historic Places in 2006.

== Geography ==
According to the 2010 census, the township has a total area of 40.16 square miles (104.0 km^{2}), of which 39.65 square miles (102.7 km^{2}) (or 98.73%) is land and 0.5 square miles (1.3 km^{2}) (or 1.25%) is water.

=== Unincorporated towns ===
- Chili at 40.860043°N 86.026381°W
- Pettysville at 40.881432°N 85.981658°W

=== Extinct towns ===
- Anson
- Paw Paw
- Wooleytown

=== Cemeteries ===
The township contains these four cemeteries: Finley, Macedonia, Musselman and Yike.

=== Airports and landing strips ===
- Rush Strip Airport

== School districts ==
- North Miami Community Schools

== Political districts ==
- Indiana's 5th congressional district
- State House District 23
- State Senate District 18
