= List of cemeteries in Indiana =

This list of cemeteries in Indiana includes currently operating, historical (closed for new interments), and defunct (graves abandoned or removed) cemeteries, columbaria, and mausolea which are historical and/or notable. It does not include pet cemeteries.

== Allen County ==
- Lindenwood Cemetery, Fort Wayne; NRHP-listed

== Boone County ==
- Oak Hill Cemetery, Lebanon; NRHP-listed

== Daviess County ==
- Old Union Church and Cemetery, Reeve Township; NRHP-listed

== Dearborn County ==
- River View Cemetery, Aurora; NRHP-listed

== Delaware County ==
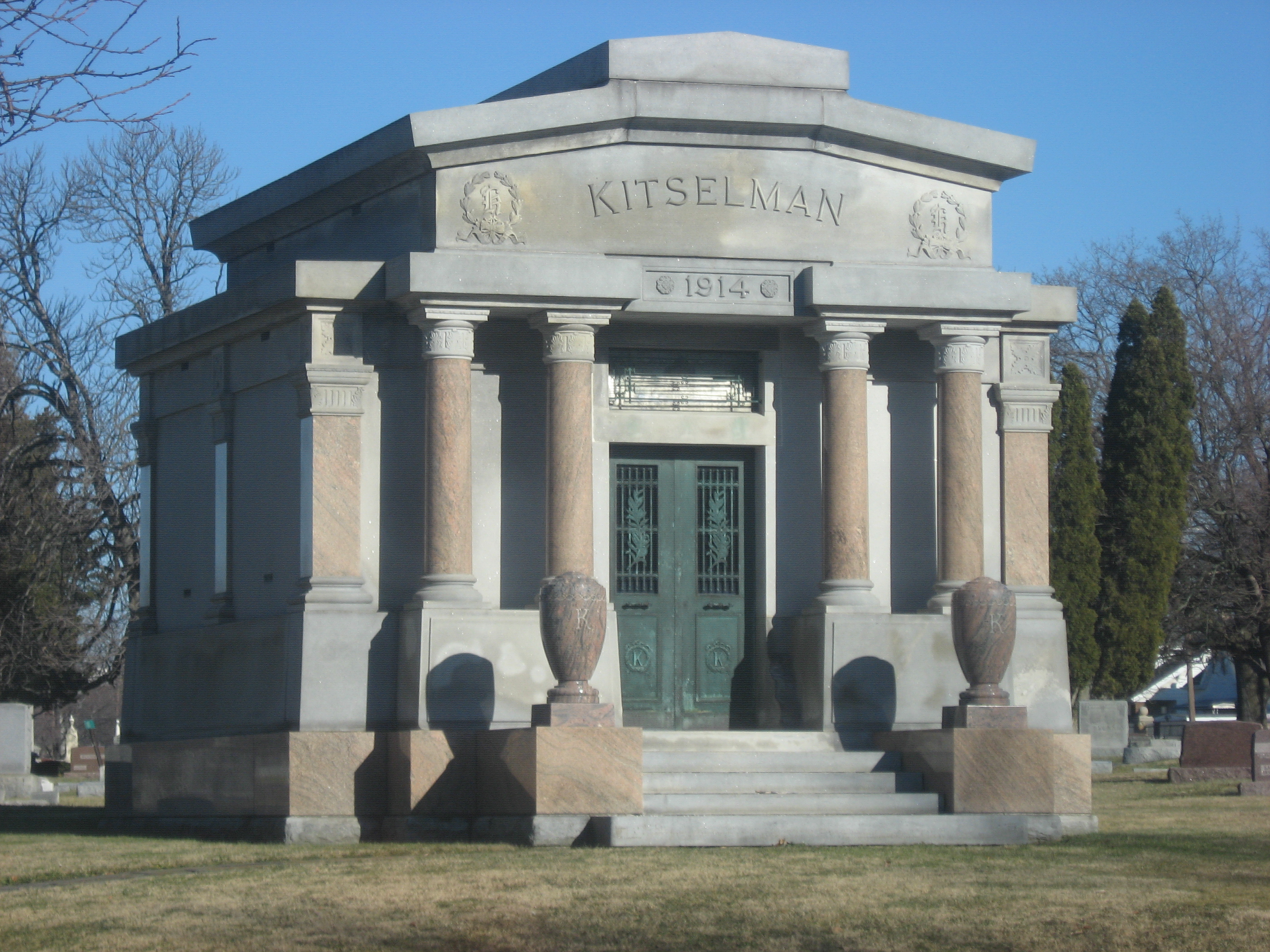
Mausoleum at Beech Grove Cemetery, in Muncie, Delaware County

- Beech Grove Cemetery, Muncie; NRHP-listed

== Floyd County ==
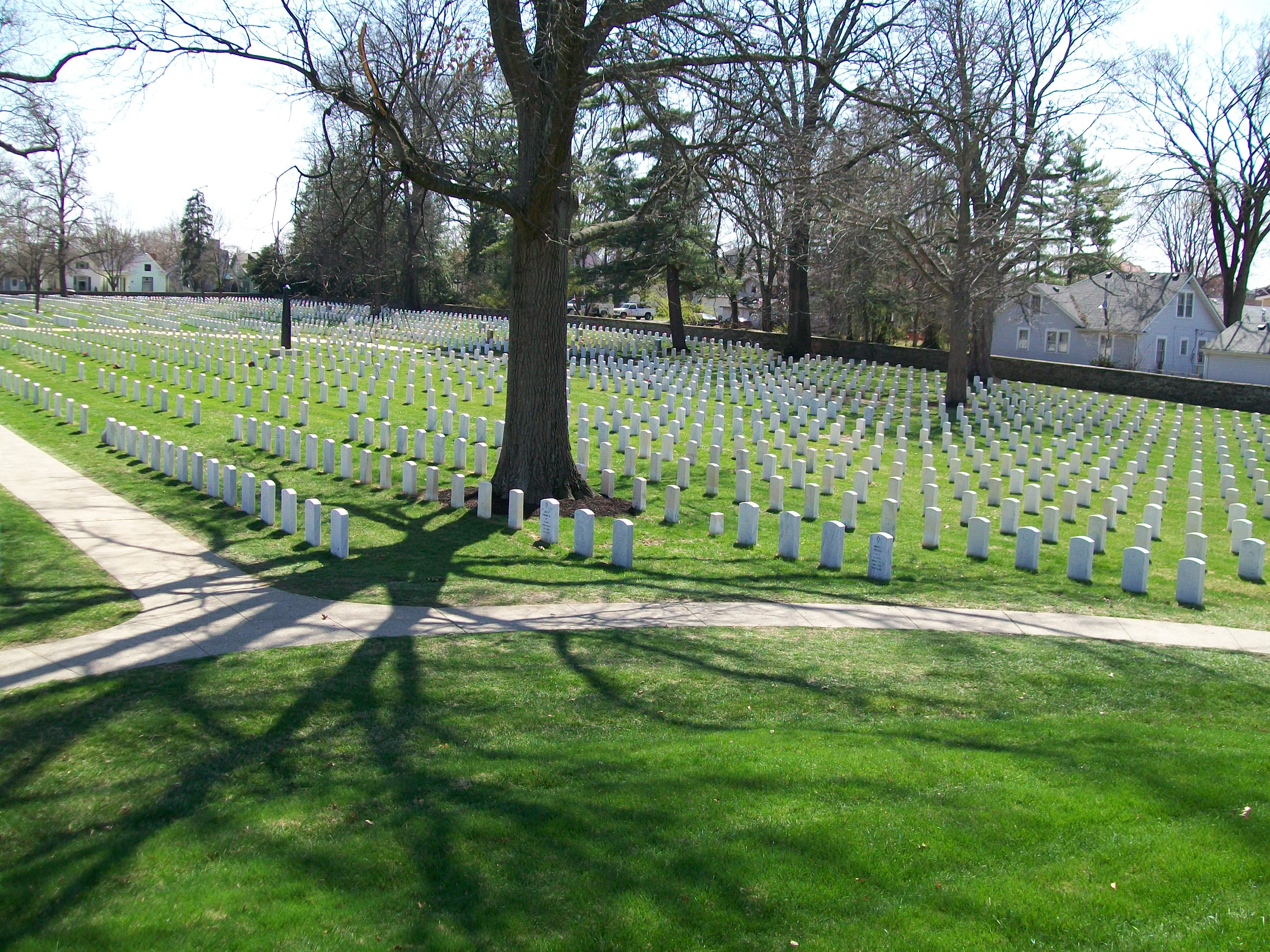
New Albany National Cemetery graves, New Albany, Floyd County

- New Albany National Cemetery, New Albany; NRHP-listed

== Fountain County ==
- Bethel Church and Graveyard, Logan Township; NRHP-listed

== Franklin County ==
- Big Cedar Baptist Church and Burying Ground, rural

== Grant County ==
- Marion National Cemetery, Marion
- Meshingomesia Cemetery and Indian School Historic District

== Hamilton County ==
- Heady Lane Cemetery, Fishers

== Hendricks County ==
- Sugar Grove Meetinghouse and Cemetery, Guilford Township; NRHP-listed

== Johnson County ==
- Greenlawn Cemetery, Franklin; NRHP-listed

== Lake County ==
- Evergreen Memorial Park Hobart

== Madison County ==
- Anderson Memorial Park, Anderson, Indiana

== Marion County ==
- Big Run Baptist Church and Cemetery, Franklin Township; NRHP-listed
- Crown Hill Cemetery, Indianapolis; NRHP-listed
- Crown Hill National Cemetery, Indianapolis; NRHP-listed
- Greenlawn Cemetery, Indianapolis

== Miami County ==
- Francis Godfroy Cemetery, Butler Township; NRHP-listed
- Waisner-Rickard Cemetery, Deer Creek Township

== Orange County ==
- Roberts & Thomas Family Cemetery, also known as Little Africa Cemetery; Lick Creek

== Parke County ==
- Pleasant Valley Cemetery, Raccoon Township

== Pike County ==
- Walnut Hill Cemetery, Petersburg

== Porter County ==
- Bailly Cemetery, Indiana Dunes National Park, Porter

== Pulaski County ==
- Noggle Cemetery, Cass Township

== Putnam County ==
- Forest Hill Cemetery, Greencastle; NRHP-listed

== Rush County ==
- East Hill Cemetery, Rushville

== Saint Joseph County ==
- South Bend City Cemetery, South Bend; NRHP-listed

== Spencer County ==
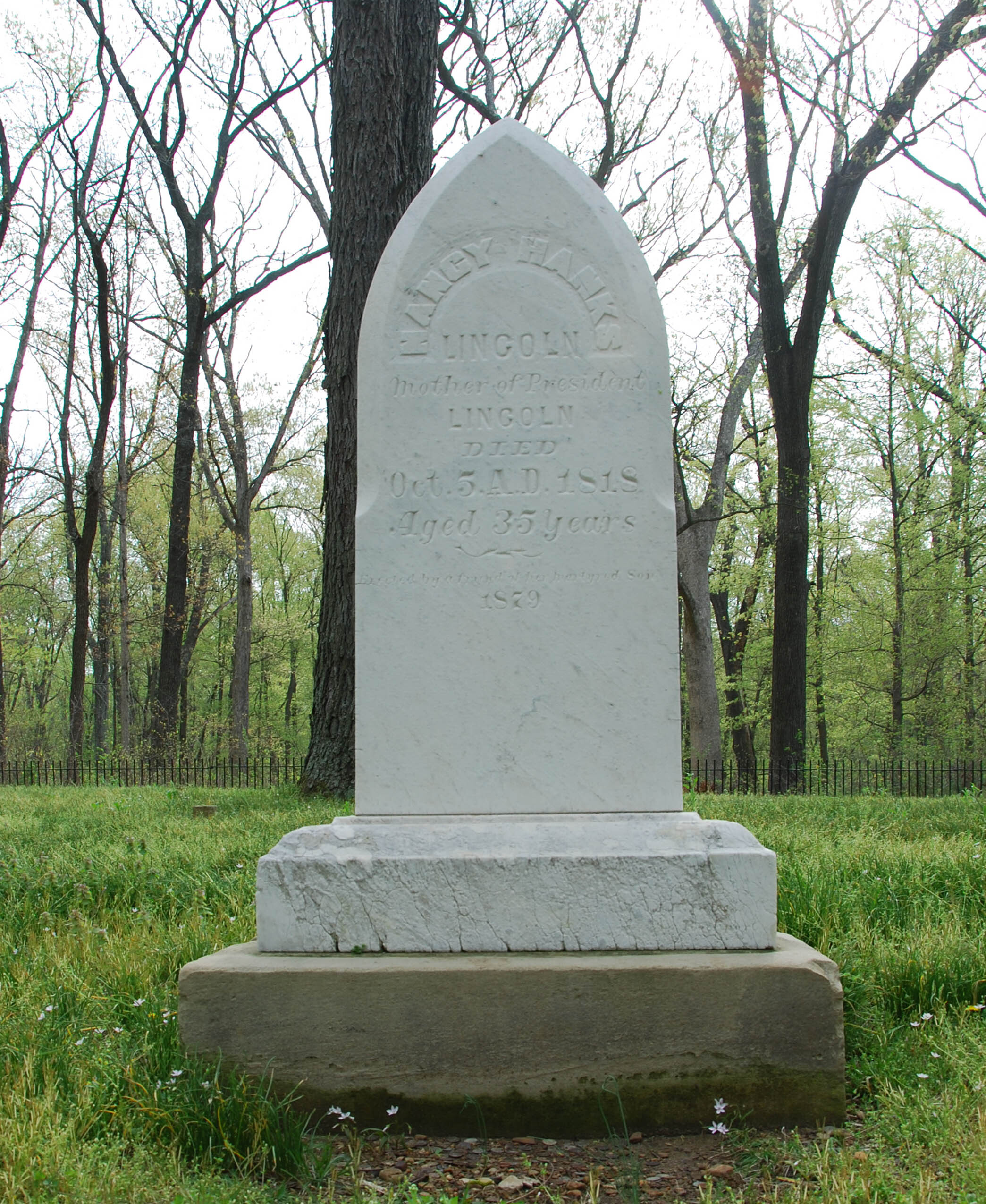
Grave of Nancy Hanks Lincoln, mother of Abraham Lincoln located at the Pioneer Cemetery at Lincoln Boyhood National Memorial in Lincoln City, Spencer County

- Nancy Hanks Lincoln Cemetery, Lincoln Boyhood National Memorial, Lincoln City; NRHP-listed

== Tippecanoe County ==
- Tippecanoe Twp. District No. 3 Schoolhouse and Cemetery, Tippecanoe Township; NRHP-listed

== Vanderburgh County ==
- McJohnston Chapel and Cemetery, Center Township; NRHP-listed
- Oak Hill Cemetery, Evansville; NRHP-listed

== Vigo County ==
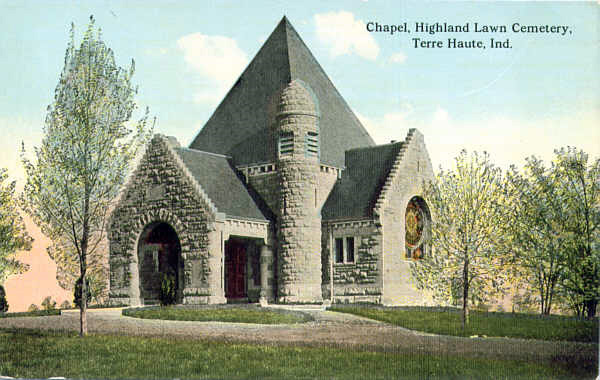
Highland Lawn Cemetery Chapel in Terre Haute, Vigo County

- Highland Lawn Cemetery, Terre Haute; NRHP-listed
- Sisters of Providence Convent Cemetery, Saint Mary-of-the-Woods

== Wayne County ==
- Doddridge Chapel and Cemetery, Washington Township; NRHP-listed

== See also ==
- List of cemeteries in the United States
