= Marcus C. Smith =

American politician

3rd Mayor of Muncie, Indiana
- In office 1869–1877
- Preceded by: Job Swain
- Succeeded by: William F. Jones

Personal details
- Born: April 11, 1825 Connersville, Indiana, United States
- Died: January 26, 1900 (aged 74) Muncie, Indiana, United States
- Occupation: attorney businessman

Marcus C. Smith (April 11, 1825 – January 26, 1900) was a Republican politician and third mayor of Muncie, Indiana. He is buried in Beech Grove Cemetery. He also was a state representative and state senator for Indiana.

He was a resident of Yorktown from 1847 to 1859.
