= List of cemeteries in Porter County, Indiana =

The earliest Cemetery in Porter County is the Bailly Cemetery, 1827. The largest in the county include: Chesterton and Graceland Cemeteries. The newest cemetery in the county is Angel Crest Cemetery, just off S.R. 49, north of Valparaiso.

Name	Dates	Location	Township	Picture	Ref pg	Ref pg
Burstrom Cemetery	c. 1870–present	Oak Hill Road, just west of US 12	Westchester		pg 5	front
Bailly Cemetery	c. 1811–1885	Oak Hill Road, Access from Bailly-Chellberg Contact Station	Westchester		pg 5	front
Furnessville Cemetery	c. 1870–present	1500 N	Pines			
Blake Cemetery	c. 1850–present	Blake Street at Concord Ave, Portage	Portage		pg 8	front
Temple of Israel (Bethel) Cemetery	c. 1916–present	East Central Ave, Portage	Portage		pg 8	front
Augsburg Cemetery	c. 1890–present	Mineral Springs Road at Beam Street	Westchester		pg 10	front
Chesterton Cemetery	c. 1835–present	Porter Ave, Chesterton	Westchester		pg 11	front
St. Patrick's Cemetery	c. 1853–present	Calumet Ave, Chesterton	Westchester		pg 11	front
Calvary Cemetery	c. 1916–present	East Central Ave, Portage	Portage		pg 13	front
McCool Cemetery	c. 1855–present	Central Ave at Airport Ave	Portage			front
Eight Square Cemetery	c,1865–present	South County Line Road (LaPorte/Porter) about 1150 N	Pine			front
James Cemetery	c. 1850–c. 1940	Rushing Water Rd, Portage	Portage		pg 13	front
Robbins Cemetery	c. 1836–present	875 W Robbins Road	Portage	Lewis and Helena Robbins with Babcock stone behind it.	pg 18	front
Gossett Cemetery (private)	c. 1840–c. 1880	149, about 900 N	Liberty		pg 18	front
Quakerdom Cemetery (private)	c. 1849– c. 1944	U.S. 6 at about 600E	Jackson			front
Carter Cemetery (private)	c. 1850–present	400 E at 700 N	Jackson			
Dillingham Cemetery	c. 1860–c. 1944	750 North at Old 49	Liberty		pg 19	front
Angel Crest Cemetery	2004 to present	600 North at SR 49	Liberty			
Kimball Cemetery	c. 1850–present	175 W, north of 575 N	Liberty		pg 23	front
Janes Cemetery (private)	c. 1846–c. 1973	675 W, just off Jones Road.	Union		pg 26	front
Mosier Cemetery (private)	c. 1846–present	600 W, just south of US 30	Union		pg 30	front
Blachly Cemetery	c. 1846–present	Joliet Road at U.S. 30	Union		pg 30	front
Kinne Cemetery	c. 1872–1987	State Route 49 at 600 N	Center			
Union Street Cemetery	c. 1839–1890	Union Street	Center			
Memorial Park Cemetery	c. 1937–present	State Route 2, south of Valparaiso	Center		pg 31	front
Graceland Cemetery	c. 1890–present	U.S. 30 at Sturdy Road	Center		pg 30	
Maplewood Cemetery	c. 1872–present	Sturdy Road south of US 30	Center		pg 30	front
St. Paul's Cemetery	c. 1867–present	Sturdy Road south of US 30	Center		pg 30	front
Luther Cemetery	c. 1840 – c. 1940	100 N at about 375 E	Washington			front
Guernsey Cemetery (private)	c. 1850 – 1920	Division at County Line Road (Lake/Porter)	Porter		pg 34	front
Fleming Cemetery	c. 1852–present	Boone Grove Road (200 W)	Porter		pg 36	front
Stoner Cemetery (private)		South Sager Rd	Morgan			front
Sacred Heart Cemetery	c. 1888–present	U.S. 30 at County Line Road (LaPorte/Porter)	Washington		pg 38	front
Frame Cemetery (private)		675 West	Porter			front
Ludington Cemetery (private)	c. 1850–present	500 West, north of SR 2	Porter			front
Shurr Cemetery (private)	c. 1860–c. 1947	300 S, near 500 W	Porter			front
White Cemetery (private)	c. 1860–c. 1870	150 S near 75E	Morgan			front
Adams Cemetery	c. 1846–present	150E at 250 S	Morgan			front
Salem Cemetery	c. 1853–present	approx 700 W 350 S	Porter			
Merriman Cemetery	c. 1860–c. 1979	250 N at 275 W	Porter			front
Hebron Cemetery	c. 1838–present	900 S and US 231, Hebron	Boone		pg 47	back
Cornell Cemetery	c. 1840–present	North of State Route 8, must north of 350W	Boone		pg 53	back
Hopewell Cemetery		South Baums Bridge Road, just before SR 8	Pleasant			back
Spencer Cemetery	c. 1840–present	South Baums Bridge Road, just before SR 8	Pleasant		pg 54	
Graceland Cemetery	c. 1902–present	State Route 8, just west of Kouts	Pleasant		pg 54	back
St. Paul's Lutheran Cemetery		State Route 8, just west of Kouts	Pleasant			
St. Mary's Catholic Cemetery		State Route 8, just west of Kouts	Pleasant			
