= Jules LaDuron =

American physician and football player

- LaDuron during his 1970 arrest
- Born: June 8, 1893; Muncie, Indiana, U.S.
- Died: February 14, 1980 (aged 86); Muncie, Indiana, U.S.
- Football career

Profile
- Positions: Fullback, linebacker

Career information
- High school: Muncie (Indiana)
- College: Indiana (1913–1915)

Career history
- Muncie Flyers (1921)
- Stats at Pro Football Reference

Jules Fernando LaDuron (June 8, 1893 – February 14, 1980) was an American physician and professional football player. He was a doctor for 55 years, primarily in Muncie, Indiana. A World War I veteran and the son of a Belgian glassblower, LaDuron attended Muncie High School, played college football at Indiana University Bloomington, and graduated from the University of Louisville School of Medicine. LaDuron was also an early National Football League player, then known as the American Professional Football Association, appearing in the league's second season with the Muncie Flyers in 1921. His first wife died of suicide in 1927 while he was away in Chicago, during which time he married his second wife. LaDuron was in the hospital with an eye injury in 1937 when his second wife disappeared. It was variously reported that he had an eye infection, or had his eye punctured while treating a patient. However, decades later, LaDuron said he was hit by a tree branch.

LaDuron's medical career was marked by numerous controversies. He was charged with assault and battery at least six times during his life but never convicted. In 1950, LaDuron fatally shot two brothers during a fight at his office and was charged with manslaughter. This reignited suspicion towards LaDuron in the disappearance of his second wife. He was found not guilty of both manslaughter charges. In 1969, after 17 years of no legal issues, LaDuron was arrested for selling dangerous drugs and trying to stab a police officer with a bayonet. He was once again acquitted of all charges. He was arrested for the fifth time in 1970 and convicted on a misdemeanor drug charge. His medical license was revoked in 1976 and he died four years later.

== Early life and football career ==
Jules Fernando LaDuron was born on June 8, 1893, in Muncie, Indiana, United States. He was the son of Fernando Jules LaDuron, a glassblower born in Belgium, and Jemima Joris, who was from Norristown, Pennsylvania. Fernando had immigrated to Muncie from Belgium to start a glassblowing factory. LaDuron played high school football at Muncie High School as a guard. In May 1911, during a baseball game between the sophomores and juniors of Muncie's High School League, LaDuron hit an opposing junior player, breaking his jaw and knocking out several of his teeth. LaDuron was arrested and charged with assault and battery and mayhem. He was released after a $400 ($13,821 in 2025) bond was paid by his father. LaDuron was expelled from school, but later reinstated. The case was dismissed on November 8, 1911. LaDuron graduated from Muncie High in the class of 1913, and gave a speech at the graduating ceremony. He received college football interest from Earlham, Wabash, DePauw, and Purdue.

LaDuron decided to enroll at Indiana University Bloomington, where he was a tackle on the Indiana Hoosiers freshman football team during the 1913 season. He joined the Phi Kappa Psi and Sigma Delta Psi fraternities that same year. LaDuron was also on the wrestling team at Indiana University. In August 1914, LaDuron, who was taking summer classes at Winona College, left without telling anyone and went to New York to go to Belgium and join the Belgian Army during World War I. The Muncie Evening Press said that LaDuron had been communicating with "strange men" who were believed to be Belgian or French agents. Police in Philadelphia and New York were asked to look out for LaDuron. He was apprehended several days later by police in New York as he was getting ready to board a ship to Belgium. On September 25, 1914, before the start of the 1914 football season, it was reported that LaDuron would not be on Indiana's team that year as he was transferring to Notre Dame. However, he returned to the Hoosiers several days later as a fullback. The Indianapolis Star noted that LaDuron was "one of the beefiest men in the line" during Indiana's 1915 season.

On March 13, 1916, during a playing of The Bohemian Girl at a theater in Bloomington, Indiana, an African American named Jim Johnson allegedly made an insulting comment about one of the actresses on stage. LaDuron then "called" him on this remark and, between acts, the dispute was renewed outside the theater where LaDuron knocked Johnson down three times and Johnson then stabbed LaDuron. Johnson managed to escape, and the wound was later reported as non-serious. LaDuron was ruled ineligible before the start of the 1916 football season at Indiana University for an unclear reason. He then served in the United States Army Ambulance Service during World War I. LaDuron played in one game, as a starter, for the Muncie Flyers of the American Professional Football Association (now National Football League) in 1921. He was listed as a fullback/linebacker while with the Flyers.

== Medical career and personal life ==
=== Early career and first wife's suicide ===
LaDuron graduated from the University of Louisville School of Medicine. He practiced as a doctor in Louisville, Kentucky, for a while after serving an internship at a hospital in Chicago, during which time he met his future second wife Freda Swanson. While in Kentucky, he reached patients on horseback. In 1920, LaDuron passed the state exam to practice medicine in Indiana, scoring over 900 points out of 1,000. In 1922, Dr. LaDuron was the Democratic Party candidate for Delaware County, Indiana, coroner. He lost the election 10,598 votes to 7,129. On October 3, 1924, he established his own hospital, the 15-bed LaDuron Hospital, on Williard Street in Muncie for general surgical cases and non-contagious diseases. In 1925, he was a candidate for Democratic councilman in the 8th ward.

On August 26, 1925, LaDuron was arrested on charges of assault and battery filed against him by Kathleen Armint. LaDuron ordered her out of his office after an argument. LaDuron then reportedly pushed her out of the office, with Armint then attempting to hit LaDuron but falling down some stairs instead. LaDuron posted bond, and the case was later dismissed on October 9, 1925. In August 1926, LaDuron was charged with assault and battery on a Muncie taxi driver named George Baughn. He was found guilty in City Court, and sentenced to 30 days on a penal farm plus a fine. However, he appealed to the Circuit Court, who found him not guilty. LaDuron said that he would have taken the case to the Supreme Court if necessary. On December 4, 1926, it was reported that LaDuron had filed suit against the Muncie Ice Machine Company and Mr. W. O. Longhecker, alleging breach of contract and asking for $1,000 ($18,186 in 2025). LaDuron said that a refrigerator installed in his office had not lived up to expectations. On December 11, 1926, LaDuron pleaded not guilty to a charge of assault and battery levied against him by Longhecker. On December 14, 1926, a judge quickly dismissed the assault charge as "false and unfounded".

At the age of 33, LaDuron married Edna Duerr, the daughter of a wealthy Louisville couple. About six months later on June 25, 1927, Edna died by suicide after hanging herself from an attic rafter in her mother's home. She had reportedly suffered a nervous breakdown the week prior. At the time of her death, LaDuron was away on special work at a Chicago hospital. A few months later while still in Chicago, LaDuron married his second wife Freda Swanson. He had two children with her, a son named Jacques and a daughter named Suzanne. In 1929, LaDuron was named the physician for both the Delaware County infirmary and the county jail. During the Great Depression, he traveled to other states to find work as a doctor. States he worked in during this time included Florida, Alabama, Michigan, and Arizona.

=== Second wife's disappearance and manslaughter charges ===
On September 16, 1937, Swanson disappeared from Muncie and was never found. Swanson, who was born in Sweden, had been married to LaDuron for nine years. They had also been separated twice during that timespan. At the time of Swanson's disappearance, LaDuron was in the hospital due to a problem with his right eye, which caused permanent vision loss in that eye. It was variously reported that LaDuron received an infection, or had his eye punctured while treating a patient. However, in 1972 LaDuron said he was hit by a tree branch. At the time of his wife's disappearance, he had been serving as Muncie city health commissioner and a corporate officer for a local beer company. In 1937, LaDuron stated "She disappears every time she flies off the handle. She'll show up. She always does." In October 1937, Muncie police detective August Felix searched the cisterns under LaDuron's home to "satisfy the gossips", and nothing was found. Police also searched three gravel pits in the area but did not find anything. In 1939, a professional deep sea diver was used to search gravel pits, ponds, and streams in the vicinity. In 1943, LaDuron pled not guilty to a charge of assault and battery against Ray Wills, a tenant on the LaDuron farm. In September 1945, LaDuron filed for divorce from Swanson. It was granted in March 1946 on the ground of desertion. Around 1950, LaDuron opened his own home office at Liberty Street in Muncie.

On November 6, 1950, LaDuron fatally shot Seibert and Ralph Carter at his home office during a fight. His 20-year-old son Jacq was also involved in the fight. LaDuron asserted self defense and said that the two brothers were trying to blackmail him over his wife's disappearance. He said he had paid $2,880 ($38,539 in 2025) to Ralph, who had been using the pseudonym Kenneth Miller, in four installments over a period of time after he was threatened. LaDuron said he and Seibert started fighting after Seibert demanded a payment. LaDuron then "whipped" Seibert by himself and told Jacq, who had just arrived, to get "Miller" from a waiting car outside so they could "settle" the matter. When "Miller" entered the office, the two brothers started fighting LaDuron and Jacq. LaDuron said he shot both of them after he was knocked down with a stirrup and a wrench. Seibert died at the scene of one shot to the heart and other injuries. Ralph had been shot several times and died soon after at a hospital. LaDuron was taken to jail pending a jury investigation. On December 6, 1950, a grand jury indicted him with two counts of manslaughter. He was released on $10,000 ($133,817 in 2025) bail. Ruby Carter, the sister-in-law of the Carters, stated "It is ridiculous to say they were blackmailing the doctor. Why Pete [Seibert] was only 27 when he died. That would have made him only 14 when Mrs. LaDuron disappeared."

On November 10, 1950, two hunters found a human skull in a gravel pit 8 miles (13 km) southeast of Muncie. Police thought it might be the remains of Swanson. The skull was taken to Ball Memorial Hospital for examination, where it was determined to be that of a man who had died 50 to 75 years earlier. Later in November, after hearing local gossip, the Indiana State Police tried to find a tunnel under LaDuron's house. However, there was nothing there nor any signs that any tunnel had ever existed. Shortly thereafter, Muncie police chief Harry Nelson ordered the opening of a grave in a Delaware County cemetery. Locals had claimed the grave appeared around the same time that Swanson disappeared. A pathologist determined that the grave's bones were from an Indian man who had died 50 years earlier.

In January 1952, during LaDuron's manslaughter trial, The Indianapolis News noted LaDuron's history of violence and that he had once killed a dog. At the trial, Ruby Carter admitted that she had previously written two blackmail letters to a doctor in Chicago on behalf of Ralph; the New York Daily News later published a picture of one of the letters in its article titled "The Strange Case of Dr. LaDuron". LaDuron said he shot the Carters after they both attacked him with a stirrup and a wrench after Jacq had been knocked out. Jacq said that after he regained consciousness, Seibert, who had already been shot, plunged at Jacq. However, Jacq dodged him, which sent Seibert through a glass door on the front porch. The prosecution noted that this did not match with the neighbor's earlier eyewitness report from 1950 in which he saw a dark-haired man knocked through the glass door. Seibert was blond and Ralph was dark-haired. On February 2, 1952, a jury found LaDuron not guilty of the manslaughter of Ralph Carter. The verdict "brought the crowd of 600 spectators to their feet cheering, whistling, and clapping their hands in approval." On May 27, 1952, the Seibert Carter manslaughter charge was also dismissed by a judge, who ruled that no new evidence had been presented since the first trial so there was no need for another one.

=== Later life, drug arrests and death ===
The rest of the 1950s and 1960s were relatively quiet for LaDuron. He continued to work on his farm ground east of Muncie and held medical office hours of 2:00 to 5:00 pm at his home. He also vacationed in Florida. In August 1960, LaDuron was accidentally run over by his own tractor's wheel but survived due to his strength (he was over 6 feet (1.8 m) and over 200 pounds (91 kg)). At one point, he also lifted a car off a man's chest with only his bare hands. In August 1963, LaDuron spoke at a public meeting about zoning changes, proclaiming "Nobody's got any business telling a farmer what he can and cannot do with his land." In October 1968, one of his cows escaped its enclosure and was killed by a car.

In early June 1969, undercover policemen made five different drug purchases at LaDuron's office. Federal law required dispensed drugs to be marked with a prescription number and the prescribing doctor's name. All five of the policemen were only given plain brown envelopes without any number or name. On June 7, 1969, LaDuron was arrested and taken to the county jail. During the arrest, LaDuron had tried to stab officer Richard Heath, head of the Muncie narcotics division, with a World War I bayonet. Eight of the 11 police officers on scene were needed to subdue LaDuron, who also tried to grab one officer's gun. Heath suffered a minor puncture wound on his hand. LaDuron was given preliminary charges of selling dangerous drugs, and assault and battery with intent to commit murder. On June 9, he was released on a $5,000 ($43,897 in 2025) cash bond. On June 13, 1969, he pleaded not guilty to selling dangerous drugs and resisting arrest. One police officer said "LaDuron was passing out drugs like peanuts." In February 1970, Grant County Circuit Court Judge Manuel Guerrero acquitted LaDuron of selling dangerous drugs after ruling that the Indiana Dangerous Drugs Act forbids police officers from buying drugs from a doctor and then using it against them as evidence. In July 1970, Madison County Circuit Court Judge Carl T. Smith acquitted LaDuron of resisting arrest since the original drug charge was not valid.

On December 15, 1970, LaDuron was arrested and charged with selling dangerous drugs again after selling 80 pills to police informant Jules "Rick" Vandelene within a one-week span. LaDuron posted a $3,000 ($24,871 in 2025) bail. The drug charge was valid under the Dangerous Drugs Act this time since Vandelene was only an "agent" of the police and not an actual policeman. LaDuron said the pills were not dangerous and that they were diet pills. In August 1972, he was convicted of a misdemeanor and sentenced to 180 days in prison plus a $500 ($3,848 in 2025) fine. This was the only criminal conviction in LaDuron's life. He filed an appeal and, in July 1974 at the age of 81, his prison term was suspended due to his age and health.

In December 1975, LaDuron's drug registration certificate was revoked by the Drug Enforcement Administration after he provided misleading information on his application in regards to his 1972 conviction. In September 1976, his medical license was revoked by the Medical Licensing Board of Indiana for "prescribing drugs without proper examination of patients." The board stated that LaDuron had given Quaalude to three undercover policemen. Sgt. Richard McCord said that on October 9, 1975, he had been given Quaalude without a physical examination, medical tests, or being asked about his medical history. McCord also claimed that he had asked LaDuron for a weight control drug known as "black beauties" and LaDuron gave him a drug that was more effective. LaDuron, who appeared at the hearing without a lawyer, said "Policemen are the biggest liars. I know because I have a couple of them in my family. I know what they are. How they act. What they do." LaDuron had been a doctor in Muncie for 55 years.

LaDuron died of a heart attack on February 14, 1980, at Ball Memorial Hospital in Muncie. He had been rushed to the hospital after becoming ill at his home. He was cremated and buried at Beech Grove Cemetery in Muncie. He was survived by his daughter Suzanne and third wife, Rena, who he had been married to for 31 years. In 1997, LaDuron's longtime neighbors the Donovans and the Rhoadeses said he was a good neighbor. Eva Mae Rhodes said "He sewed a few of my kids up when they needed stitches."

== Legacy ==
In 2016, surviving relatives of LaDuron, including his grandson, threatened to disinter LaDuron's remains as a response to a tour of his grave that had been planned for the future. His grandson stated "His only conviction was one misdemeanor, and nothing was ever proven. It's just folklore. We're trying to bring it to an end. If we have to, we'll remove his ashes and be done with it." The grave tour was cancelled. In 2018, LaDuron's story was featured in the book Muncie Murder & Mayhem.

Sometime between the 1940s and 1960s, LaDuron was serving as the ring doctor for a professional wrestling event in Muncie. After a Gorgeous George match ended the show, LaDuron stopped to talk to organizer George Maupin, himself a former heavyweight wrestler and an acquaintance of LaDuron. The two then started fighting each other for no apparent reason. The over 200-pound (91 kg) LaDuron and Maupin exchanged punches, bounced their heads off wall tiles, and hit each other with metal chairs. In 1980, The Star Press senior sports editor Bob Barnet recalled it was "one of the hardest fights ever seen in an armory that had hosted a lot of professional boxing bouts as well as wrestling matches." The two then stopped fighting, looked at each other, and left the armory.
