= George Dale =

George Dale may refer to:

- George Dale (criminal) (1906–1934), lover and criminal partner of Eleanor Jarman, executed by the state of Illinois for murder
- George R. Dale (1867–1936), American newspaper editor and politician in Indiana
- George N. Dale (1834–1903), American lawyer and politician in Vermont
- George Dale (footballer) (1892–1961), English association footballer
