= William F. Jones =

American politician

- In office 1877–1879

4th Mayor of Muncie, Indiana
- Preceded by: Marcus C. Smith
- Succeeded by: Charles W. Kilgore

6th Mayor of Muncie, Indiana
- In office 1881–1883
- Preceded by: Charles W. Kilgore
- Succeeded by: Frank Ellis

Personal details
- Born: March 30, 1813 Duchess County, New York, United States
- Died: October 27, 1890 (aged 77) Muncie, Indiana, United States
- Children: Alice A. (Jones) Medsker
- Occupation: railroad official

William F. Jones (March 30, 1813 - October 27, 1890) was a Republican politician and both the fourth and sixth mayor of Muncie, Indiana. He also was a state representative, a member of the Muncie City Council, and the Muncie School Board. He is buried in Beech Grove Cemetery.

He was a resident of Ohio from 1832 to 1842 and Hartford City from 1842 to 1852.

His papers are at the Indiana State Library.
