= Dennis Tyler =

American politician

33rd Mayor of Muncie, Indiana
- In office January 1, 2012 – January 1, 2020
- Preceded by: Sharon McShurley
- Succeeded by: Dan Ridenour

Member of the Indiana House of Representatives from the 34th district
- In office December 30, 2005 – December 28, 2011
- Preceded by: R. Tiny Adams
- Succeeded by: Michael White

Personal details
- Born: December 4, 1942 (age 83) Muncie, Indiana, U.S.
- Party: Democratic
- Spouse: Vickie Tyler
- Occupation: Politician

Dennis Tyler (born December 4, 1942) is a former American politician who served as the mayor of Muncie, Indiana. On November 18, 2019, he was arrested by the Federal Bureau of Investigation and charged with theft of government funds. He was sentenced on November 10, 2021, to one year and one day, his mayoral term having expired on January 1, 2020. He was released from prison in April 2022.

== Career ==
Tyler grew up on the south side of Muncie and is a graduate of Muncie Central High School. He served as a Line Captain for the Muncie Fire Department before retiring after 42 years of service. On January 4, 2006, he was sworn into office as a member of the Indiana House of Representatives, elected as the Democratic Party candidate. He represented District 34 for six years. Tyler served on committees that focused on veteran's affairs, public safety, employment labor, pensions, roads, transportation, autism, and government reform.

During his tenure in the House, Tyler was an advocate for victims of violent crimes, introducing legislation that in the absence of a will, no share of a deceased person's estate should go to a parent convicted of killing the other parent. Tyler resigned from the Legislature in December 2011 to assume the duties of Mayor, effective January 1, 2012.

Tyler and his administration re-opened two fire stations, consolidated animal control, re-initiated summer programming in the parks, graded more than 30 lane miles of roads and 70 alleys, presented more than 50 proclamations, received almost $8 million in grants, and announced nearly 100 new jobs and over $3.2 million in new payroll, representing over $30 million in new capital investment.

Tyler has been active in many community organizations, including United Way, the Knights of Pythias, and the Fraternal Order of Eagles. He has been the Chairman of the Labor and Industry Board of the NAACP since 2010.

Tyler did not run for re-election in 2019, and at year-end was succeeded by Republican Dan Ridenour, a member of the Muncie City Council and financial officer.

== Arrest ==
On November 18, 2019, Tyler was arrested by the Federal Bureau of Investigation at his home, based upon corruption allegations. The federal probe revealed bid-rigging, mail and wire fraud, fraudulent bids, money laundering, and other organized crime schemes that drained the city of funds. Six others were previously arrested as part of the probe into Tyler's administration, including his appointed building commissioner, Craig Nichols. Prior to his arrest, Tyler and his administration had been under investigation by the FBI and the U.S. District Court for the Southern District of Indiana since 2016. Tyler is expected to stand trial on August 10, 2020. He was represented by famed Indiana attorney James H. Voyles Jr.

Tyler and federal prosecutors struck a deal in May 2021 to plead guilty to one count of theft of government funds. He was condemned to one year and one day in jail in November 2021. He was also sentenced to three years of supervised release and forced to pay $15,250 in restitution. In April, 2022 he was released from federal prison after serving more than five months.
