= Anna Augusta Truitt =

American philanthropist and temperance reformer (1837–1920)

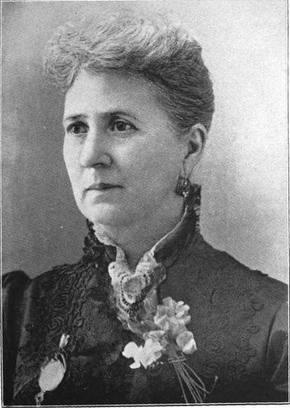
- Photo in A Woman of the Century
- Born: Anna Augusta Pattin; 1837; Canaan, New Hampshire, United States
- Died: June 9, 1920 (aged 83); Muncie, Indiana, United States
- Resting place: Beech Grove Cemetery, Muncie, Indiana, U.S.
- Education: College Hills Seminary
- Occupations: Philanthropist, reformer, essayist
- Spouse: John P. Ramsey (m. 1860; died 1864) Joshua Truitt (m. 1864; died 1894)
- Relatives: Salmon P. Chase; John Greenleaf Whittier
- Writing career
- Language: English
- Movement: Temperance

Anna Augusta Truitt (née, Pattin; after first marriage, Ramsey; after second marriage, Truitt; 1837 – June 9, 1920) was an American philanthropist, temperance reformer, and essayist. For many years, she provided services for the Woman's Christian Temperance Union (WCTU), acting as delegate from the local to the district, state and national conventions. Her essays, addresses and reports showed her to be a talented writer. "Benevolence" was said to be her one underlying character trait.

== Early life and education ==
Anna Augusta Pattin was born in Canaan, New Hampshire, in 1837. Her father was Daniel G. Pattin. Her mother, Ruth Chase Whittier, was related to Governor Salmon P. Chase and the poet John Greenleaf Whittier.

At an early age, her father emigrated to Upstate New York, where she was educated by private tutors. She subsequently spent two years in College Hills Seminary.

== Career ==
She married John P. Ramsey in 1860. They settled in the South, where they resided until the American Civil War, when, on account of diametrical differences of opinion between themselves and the inhabitants, they returned to the North, but at a large sacrifice of personal and other property. Here, in 1864, Mr. Ramsey died.

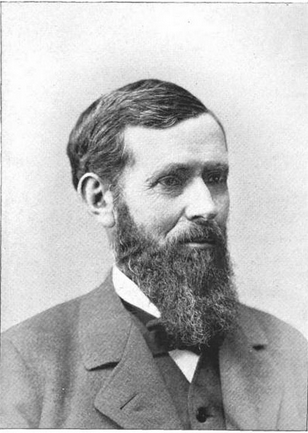
Joshua Truitt

On May 17, 1864, in Mansfield, Ohio, she married Joshua Truitt (1830–1894), a businessman of Muncie, Indiana. He brought with him two children, Lola and Stanley, his first wife having died the previous December. The family made their home in Muncie, where Truitt became actively engaged in benevolent and philanthropic work. During the Civil War, she was untiring in her labors in behalf of the Union Army, preparing bandages and scraping lint for the use of the surgeons, and collecting provisions, clothing, blankets, and hundreds of other things useful and needful to the soldiers. She marched, sang and prayed with them.

After the war, she became engaged in the work of the WCTU. She served as president of the Delaware County, Indiana WCTU for several years, and was selected by the Union to represent them in state and district meetings, as well as in the national convention in Tennessee in November 1887. She was the Indiana temperance delegate to the International Sunday School Convention held at Pittsburgh, Pennsylvania, in June 1890, and her report of its proceedings was accepted without alteration or amendment, which spoke well for her accuracy, lucidity, and logical trend of thought. In the WCTU, she adhered to the principle of nonpartisan, nonsectarian work. In a blue-ribbon temperance club, she was an untiring worker and spared neither time, effort nor means in advancing its interests. She was also an advocate of suffrage, believing that woman's vote would go far towards the cause of temperance.

For years, she was identified with the industrial school of Muncie, serving as an officer, as well as performing duties in its meetings and those pertaining to the executive department. Her presence was familiar in the homes of the poor, carrying sympathy, counsel and needed food and clothing. In this connection, there was probably no other one woman in Muncie known to more children than Truitt, who was constantly performing for them some work of kindness.

== Personal life ==
She had no children of her own, but she took into her family the four children of her deceased brother, taking on the role of their mother. For many years, Truitt was an attendant of the Presbyterian church. She died June 9, 1920, and was buried at Beech Grove Cemetery, in Muncie.
