= George R. Dale =

American mayor and newspaper editor (1867–1936)

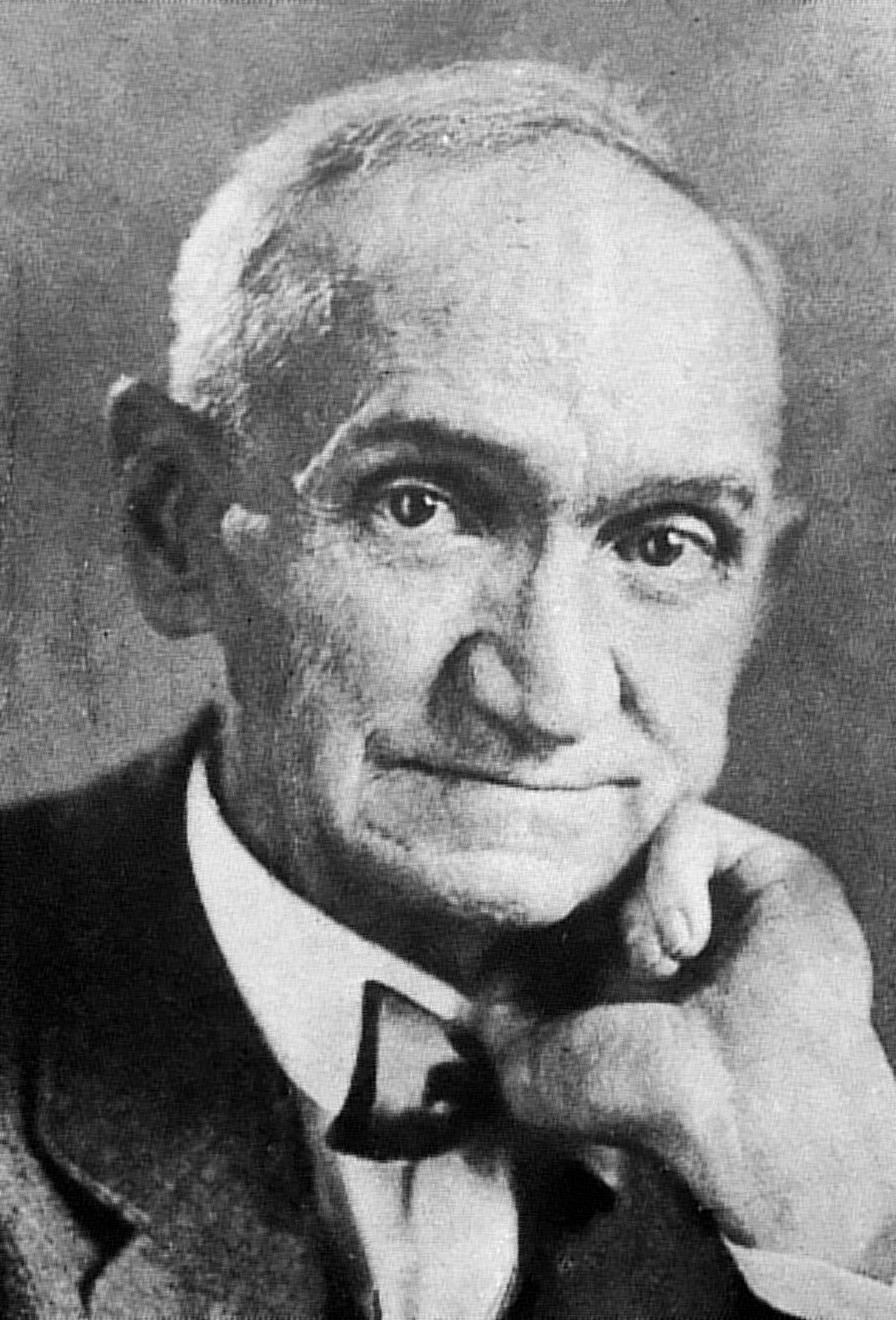
- George R. Dale in 1929

16th Mayor of Muncie, Indiana
- In office January 6, 1930 – January 1, 1935 (Note: Impeached in September 1932, but restored by courts later that year)
- Preceded by: John C. Hampton
- Succeeded by: Rollin Bunch

Personal details
- Born: February 5, 1867 Monticello, Indiana, US
- Died: March 27, 1936 (aged 69) Muncie, Indiana, US
- Party: Democratic Party
- Occupation: Editor-in-chief of the Muncie Post-Democrat
- Criminal charges: Violation of prohibition of alcohol
- Criminal status: Pardoned

George Reynolds Dale Sr. (February 5, 1867 – March 27, 1936) was an American newspaper editor and politician. He was the editor of the Muncie Post-Democrat from 1920 to 1936 and the mayor of Muncie, Indiana, from 1930 to 1935, a member of the Democratic Party. He started several newspapers and battled bootleggers and the Ku Klux Klan (KKK).

Born in Monticello, Indiana, Dale produced his first newspapers in Hartford City and Montpelier. He moved to Muncie, where he founded the Muncie Post, at the invitation of mayor Rollin Bunch, whom he would later oppose. After this paper shuttered, he founded the weekly Muncie Post-Democrat in 1921, with a left-wing, pro-labor stance. The paper's reporting on bootleggers, as well as accusations of corruption against the leader of the county's Republican Party, led to attacks on Dale.

Dale's Post-Democrat frequently opposed the KKK. He mocked the group and published lists of its local members and businesses. In 1923, the paper accused a judge, Clarence W. Dearth, of being affiliated with the group, for which the judge charged Dale with libel and contempt of the court. The Indiana Supreme Court upheld these charges before Dale was pardoned by Governor Edward L. Jackson. Many Indiana citizens and several national newspapers supported Dale, claiming that the charges had violated the right to freedom of the press. Dale gained national fame for this incident.

Dale won the 1929 election for mayor of Muncie. Days after his inauguration, he replaced the city's police and fire departments. City councilors opposed Dale. They impeached him for an alcohol conviction, but he was restored to the office and pardoned for the conviction. During the New Deal, Dale used federal funds for public works projects. Dale lost his re-election bid at the end of his five-year term. He edited the Post-Democrat until his death in 1936. Historical assessment of Dale has been positive, focusing on his resistance of the KKK.

== Early and personal life ==
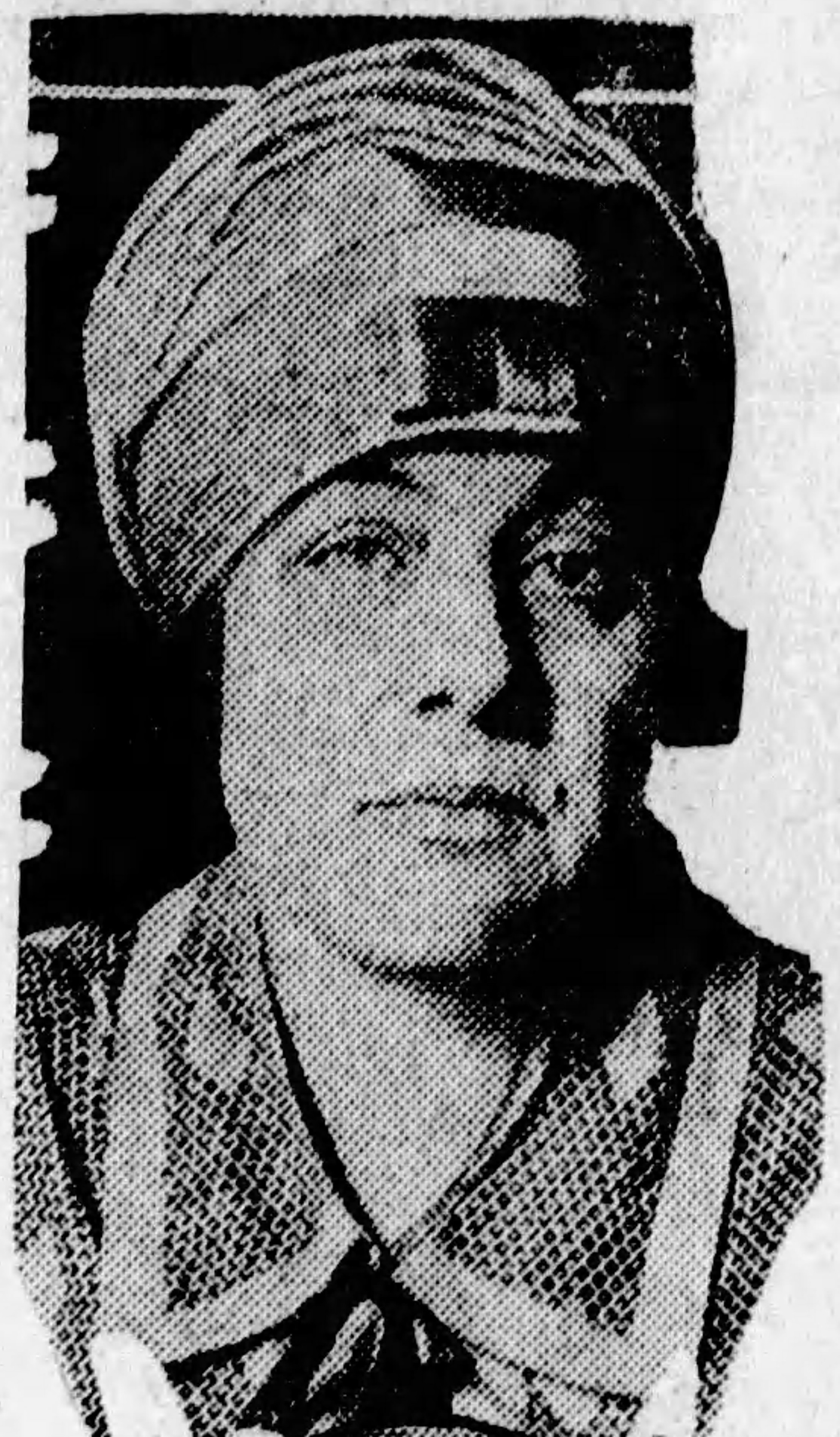
Dale's wife, Lena (née Mohler), c. 1927

George Reynolds Dale was born on February 5, 1867, (Note: An obituary in the Muncie Evening Press stated his date of birth as February 15, 1869.) in Monticello, White County, Indiana. His mother, Ophelia Reynolds, was also born in Monticello and was a Presbyterian of Irish descent. His father, Daniel D. Dale, had been the captain of Company K of the 19th Indiana Regiment during the U.S. Civil War, later serving as the clerk of White County and of the Indiana State Senate. Dale's grandfather, William Dale, had migrated to White County from Virginia. Dale had three siblings: Charles H., Bertha M., and Ida.

Dale went to school in Monticello, dropping out of twelfth grade due to chronic headaches. He briefly worked at his father's law office but found it boring. His father died of injuries from being assaulted in 1886, and his mother died of pneumonia in 1887. After briefly working at a dry goods store in Monticello, Dale moved to Hartford City, Indiana, aged 21, to work at a paper mill owned by his uncle, Albert Reynolds. He was the clerk of Hartford City for one year. Dale married Lena Mohler in Hartford City on January 14, 1900. They had seven children.

== Publishing career ==
=== Early career ===
Dale and Charles Wigmore produced the Hartford City Press, which they acquired in April 1893. This was Dale's first experience in news and was the city's first daily paper. After a dispute with a business partner, Dale sold his stake in the paper after about a year. He moved to Montpelier, Indiana, where he founded the Montpelier Call around 1905. He returned to Hartford City and established the Hartford City Daily Journal in March 1909.

Dale became known for his opposition to gambling and to alcohol, which he called "demon rum". His newspapers led to the closure of bars in Hartford City and Montpelier. According to his wife, Dale was not opposed to alcohol itself, but rather its association with corrupt politicians. After the success of his campaigns, interest in the Journal declined, and Dale sold its subscription list to the Times-Gazette. He moved to Muncie, Indiana, in 1916 at the invitation of mayor Rollin Bunch and his brother, Fred. The mayor, a member of the Democratic Party, was opposed to the Ku Klux Klan (KKK), which motivated him to establish a newspaper with Dale. Dale was the editor of the Muncie Post until it folded in 1918. He attributed its closure to a boycott over its pro-labor stance. Dale also served as a police sergeant under Bunch. He cut ties with Bunch after the latter was imprisoned for mail fraud in 1919.

=== Establishment of the Muncie Post-Democrat ===
Dale created the Muncie Post-Democrat, a weekly newspaper, in 1920; it had previously been called the Muncie Democratic Post. Taking a left-leaning stance, it was the only paper aligned with the Democratic Party in Delaware County. His paper was the city's first to report on labor disputes, despite resistance from the city's chamber of commerce and from the Ball brothers, who owned a jar company that was the city's largest employer.

Dale reported on crimes such as bootlegging. He wrote that he had faced several attacks due to this reporting:

... the editor was assaulted by one man, threats of assault and murder were every day occurrences, plots were laid to plant liquor in our office and then have the police pull off a raid, a plot was laid to "knock off" the editor while making an automobile trip into Ohio, and our home was even invaded during our absence by a band of thugs, who told the wife of the editor that they would "get" him before the night was over.

— Muncie Post-Democrat, December 16, 1921

Dale wrote that the leader of the Delaware County Republican Party, William H. "Billy" Williams, was corrupt and ran a political machine with connections to bootleggers and the KKK. Dale wrote that this group had supported Bunch's campaign. According to historian Carrolyle M. Frank, the existence of a political machine may have largely been Dale's invention. On March 24, 1922, Dale was attacked and his son, George Jr., was shot. He reported two weeks later that the attack was caused by his reporting on Williams.

Local government officials refused to advertise in the Post-Democrat, favoring Muncie's two Republican newspapers, until Dale presented them with court orders under a state law requiring them to advertise in publications of both parties. Dale did not endorse Bunch as the Democratic candidate in the 1921 mayoral election as the candidacy violated a state law barring felons from public office and his belief that Bunch was associated with organized crime. Dale's editorials led to a decrease in support for Bunch, who lost to the Republican candidate, John C. Quick. Dale's opposition to Bunch caused a rift among local Democrats. Opponents of Dale said they would start an opposing newspaper; they founded the city's second Democratic newspaper in 1924, which shuttered the same year.

=== Opposition to the Ku Klux Klan ===
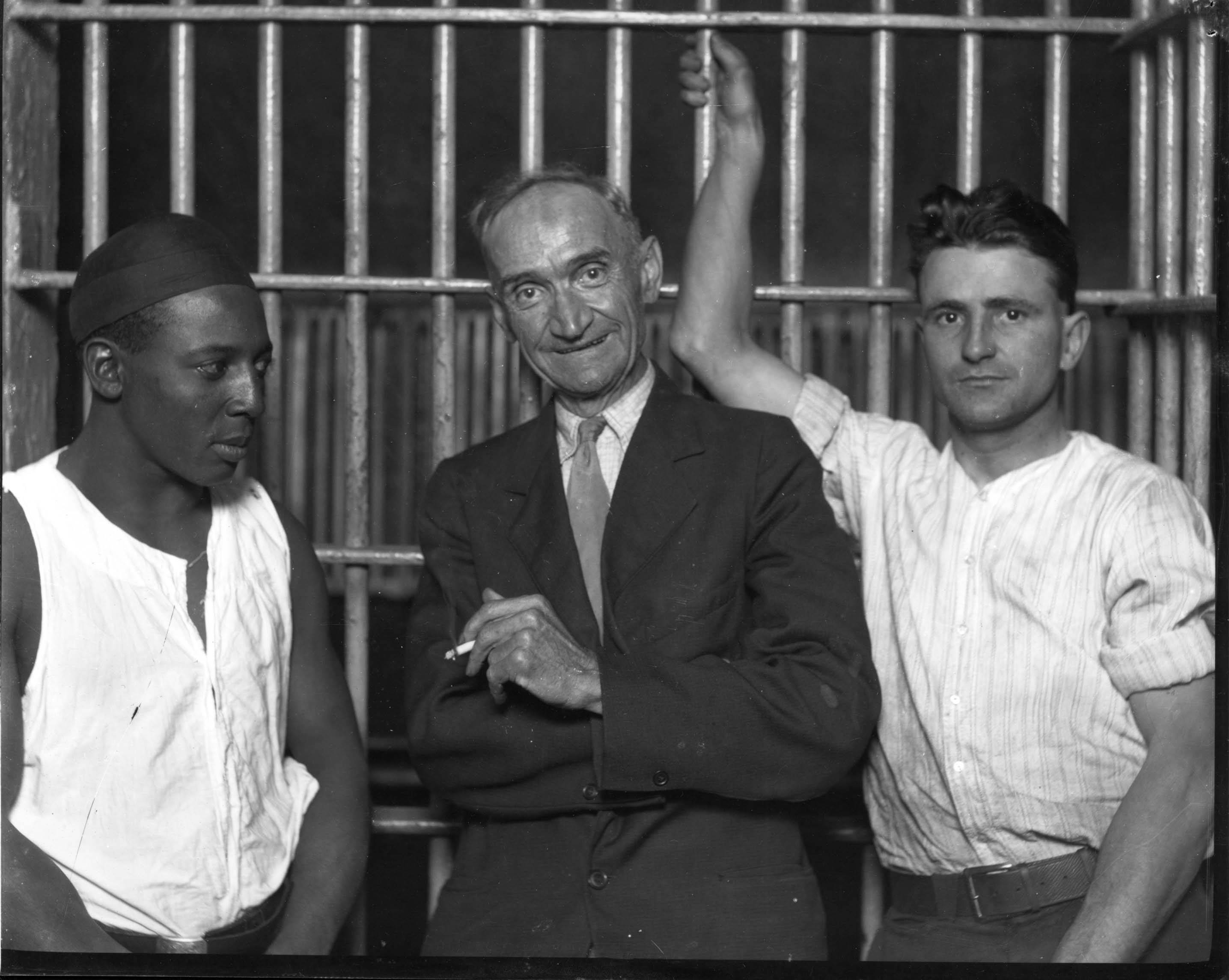
Dale (center) in Delaware County Jail in 1926

With a reputation for his satirical attacks on several subjects Dale was called the "militant editor". As editor of the Post-Democrat, Dale combatted the Ku Klux Klan (KKK). The Indiana Ku Klux Klan, formed in the early 1920s, had hundreds of thousands of members, including 3,000 in Muncie; few of the state's newspapers took a stance against the organization. As local KKK members were largely Republican and anti-labor, many were opponents of Dale. Dale initially supported the KKK, writing in April 1922 that there was "plenty of room for an organization of this kind to work in Delaware County", though he disliked their outfits. His first report opposing the organization came a few months later:

Strange things are happening in Muncie these days, Hundreds of citizens here, many of them being men of high character, are joining the Ku Klux Klan, but we question very much whether or not a very large percentage of those are really aware of the things pulled off by an inner circle of Kluckers, who, most likely, refrain from informing the rank and file of the Klan of their maneuvers.

— Muncie Post-Democrat, June 9, 1922

Dale began reporting on the KKK in nearly every edition, publishing reprints from national publications as well as allegations against local KKK members. He published the names of these supposed members and of businesses run by the group. He wrote that the Williams political machine worked with the KKK. He described KKK members as "kookoos", mocked their ideology of "100 percent Americanism", and employed exaggerations and disparaging nicknames to describe its members, such as referring to Daisy Douglas Barr as Daisy Doodle Barr. Dale said that KKK members would shove or spit at him. He began to blame the KKK for the 1922 attack, although it had occurred before his KKK reports.

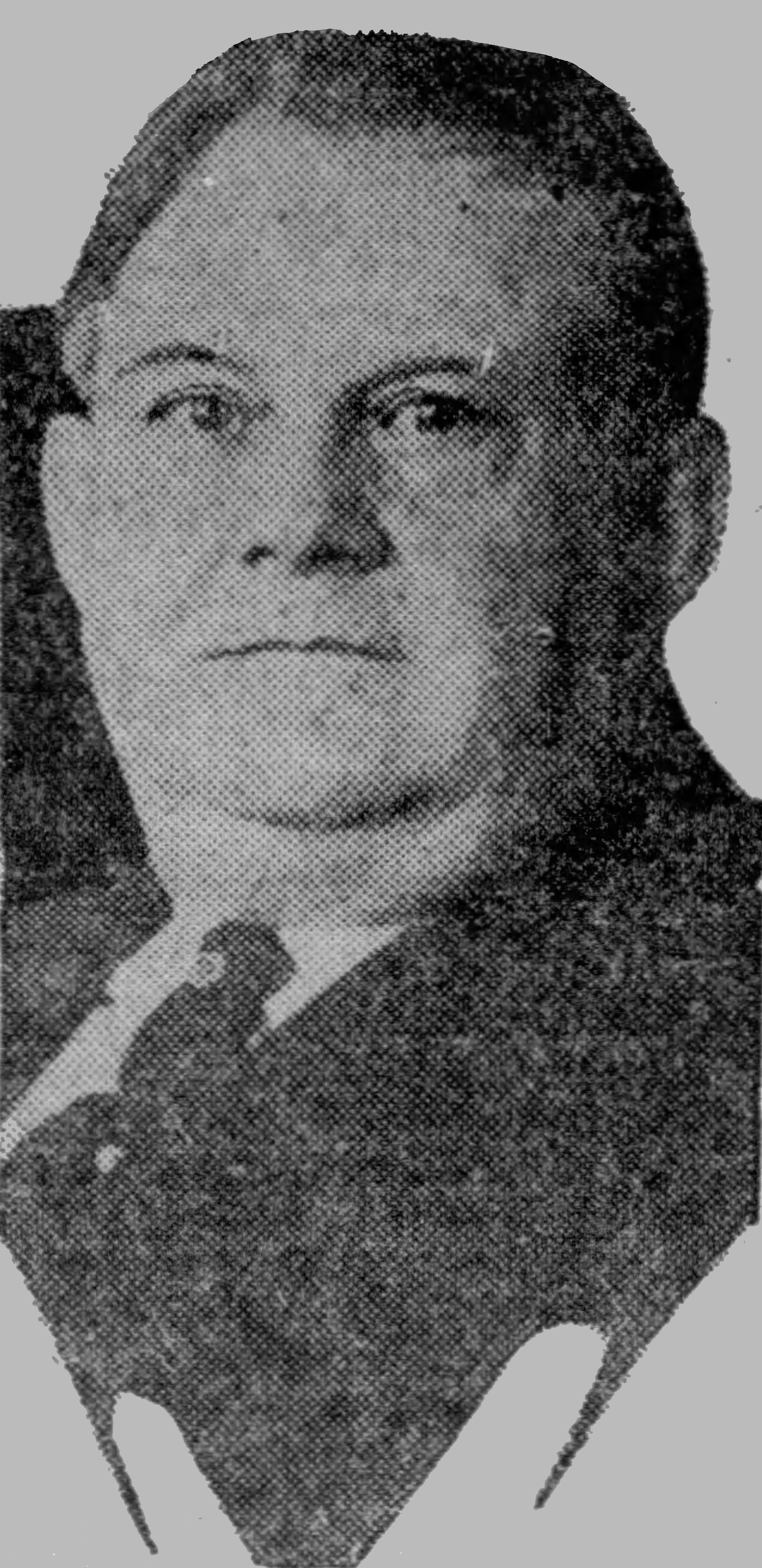
Judge Clarence W. Dearth, c. 1927

Several KKK members took legal action against Dale. In 1923, Dale wrote that a judge of the Delaware County Circuit Court, Clarence W. Dearth, was a KKK member who engaged in illegal jury selection practices and gave lower sentences to KKK members. That March, Dearth sentenced Dale to a 90-day jail sentence and a $500 fine for libel and for indirect contempt of the court. Dale wrote about his court hearing in the following week's newspaper. Dearth ruled that this was direct contempt of the court and increased the sentence to 180 days. On appeal, the Indiana Supreme Court ruled against Dale, saying, "the truth of the article is not a matter of defense." Indiana citizens petitioned the state legislature to impeach Dearth for violating the First Amendment right to freedom of the press, but the impeachment trial acquitted him on all 21 charges. Dale appealed to the Supreme Court of the United States, which dismissed the case on a technicality. Dale was pardoned by Governor Edward L. Jackson—a KKK member—after two days in jail.

Several national publications, including the New York World, The Chicago Tribune, and the Hearst newspapers, opposed the court's ruling on the grounds of freedom of the press. They raised money for Dale's legal defense fund. The coverage gave Dale national recognition and led to a large increase in revenue for the newspaper, which reached nearly 18,000 subscribers. Democratic and Republican newspapers, as well as Dale himself, presented him as a hero. Reports resurfaced of the 1922 attack. He asserted that he had killed a KKK member during this attack, and his reenactment of it in a Chicago newspaper was widely circulated. To strengthen this image, he wore a hat with what he said was a KKK-inflicted bullet hole and displayed KKK hoods in his house. The media also reported on gunshots at Dale's house in 1926, attributing this to the KKK. However, Dale blamed this attack on bootleggers, and the KKK's presence in Muncie had declined. The Post-Democrat infrequently reported on the KKK by this time.

Dale received physical and verbal attacks and eventually had to print the newspaper outside of Indiana. He wrote of his anti-KKK reporting, "I lost my advertising, most of my subscribers, my home, my liberty, and every dollar I had in the world." However, according to historian Ron F. Smith, the KKK caused only a part of his financial issues, as the newspaper had gained subscribers and did not significantly lose advertising after it began reporting on the subject. During this time, Dale also ran in the Democratic primary in the 1928 Indiana gubernatorial election. He received the third-most votes but was unsuccessful in the party convention, receiving support only from Delaware County's delegation.

=== Mayorship of John C. Hampton ===
Dale became known for his criticism of the mayor of Muncie, John C. Hampton, a Republican elected in 1925. Hampton was an alleged KKK member who had worked for Dearth in jury selection. Dale accused him of electoral fraud in the primary. Dale's criticisms of Hampton as mayor included an allegation that he sanctioned a "paving trust" that exerted control over street paving contracts. (Note: According to Carrolyle M. Frank, this allegation was plausible but circumstantial.) Editor Wilbur E. Sutton of The Muncie Evening Press, a Republican publication, found this allegation credible. The Municipal League of Delaware County, affiliated with the anti-Williams-Hampton faction of the Republican Party, launched an investigation.

Dale published a letter to the editor opposing Hampton and Dearth in February 1927. Dearth ordered that this edition of the newspaper not be distributed. This led to an impeachment trial against him. The Indiana House of Representatives voted 93-to-1 for his impeachment, but a slim majority in the Senate kept him in office. County citizens forced him to retire the following year.

Dale alleged that gambling, bootlegging, and prostitution operations had the backing of city and county law enforcement. He said that police officers abetted the 1926 attack against him. Federal agents raided Muncie bars in November 1927 without informing the mayor's office or police department, and their reports implied the mayor did little to enforce Prohibition laws against alcohol. Hampton never faced charges, but the people of Muncie largely supported Dale's statements.

== Mayor of Muncie ==
=== Election ===
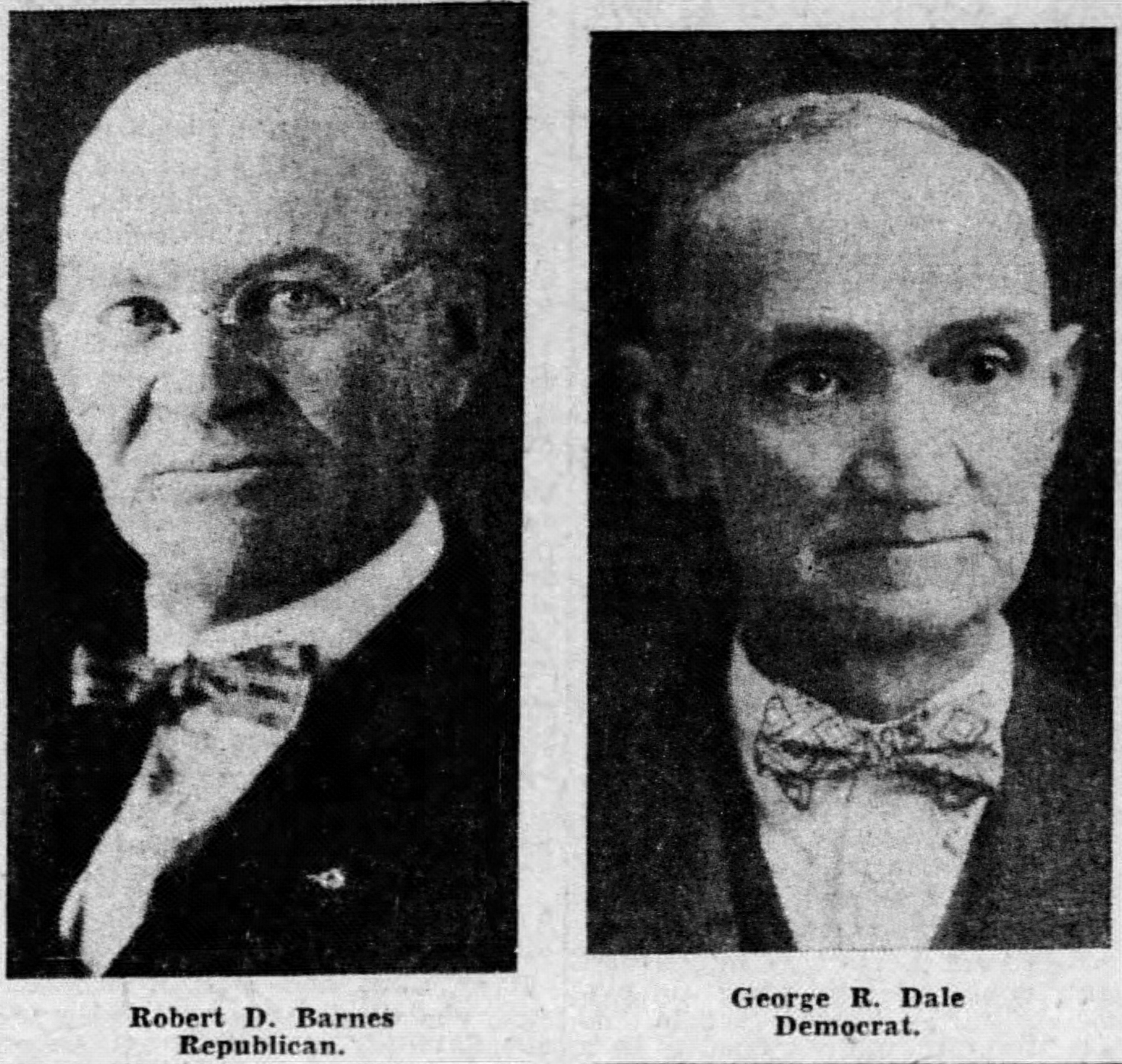
Dale and Robert D. Barnes, the party nominees in the 1929 Muncie mayoral election

Hampton did not run for re-election in 1929. Dale announced his candidacy that March. He ran as a Democrat in a mostly Republican city; both parties had internal rifts. Dale won the Democratic primary by a large margin despite opposition from the party establishment. He then called for the resignation of the chair of the Muncie Democratic Party, J. Wilbur Sims; after he refused to resign, Dale's faction held an election that chose a rival chair. The Republican Party nominated businessman Robert Denver Barnes, who had the support of influential people such as the Ball brothers whom Dale had criticized. Republicans of the anti-Williams-Hampton faction, who had supported Calvin Faris in the primary, did not endorse Barnes, and some endorsed Dale.

Dale ran on a platform on reforming the government. His campaign's key promises were rule by the populace rather than a political machine, fairness in contracts, fairness in law enforcement, and municipal ownership of utilities. He communicated to voters in the Post-Democrat and on Muncie's radio station.

Dale won in November by a landslide margin of 1,349 votes, more than any candidate had previously won. His win was an upset, with his largest margins in precincts that had voted for Hampton. Muncie was one of eight major Indiana cities to switch from Republican to Democratic mayors in that year's elections. Upon his election, a Pennsylvania newspaper wrote that he had "finally emerged completely victorious" over the KKK. Dale used his newspaper to announce his appointments to government positions, rather than making a single announcement as was typical.

=== Inauguration and law enforcement overhaul ===
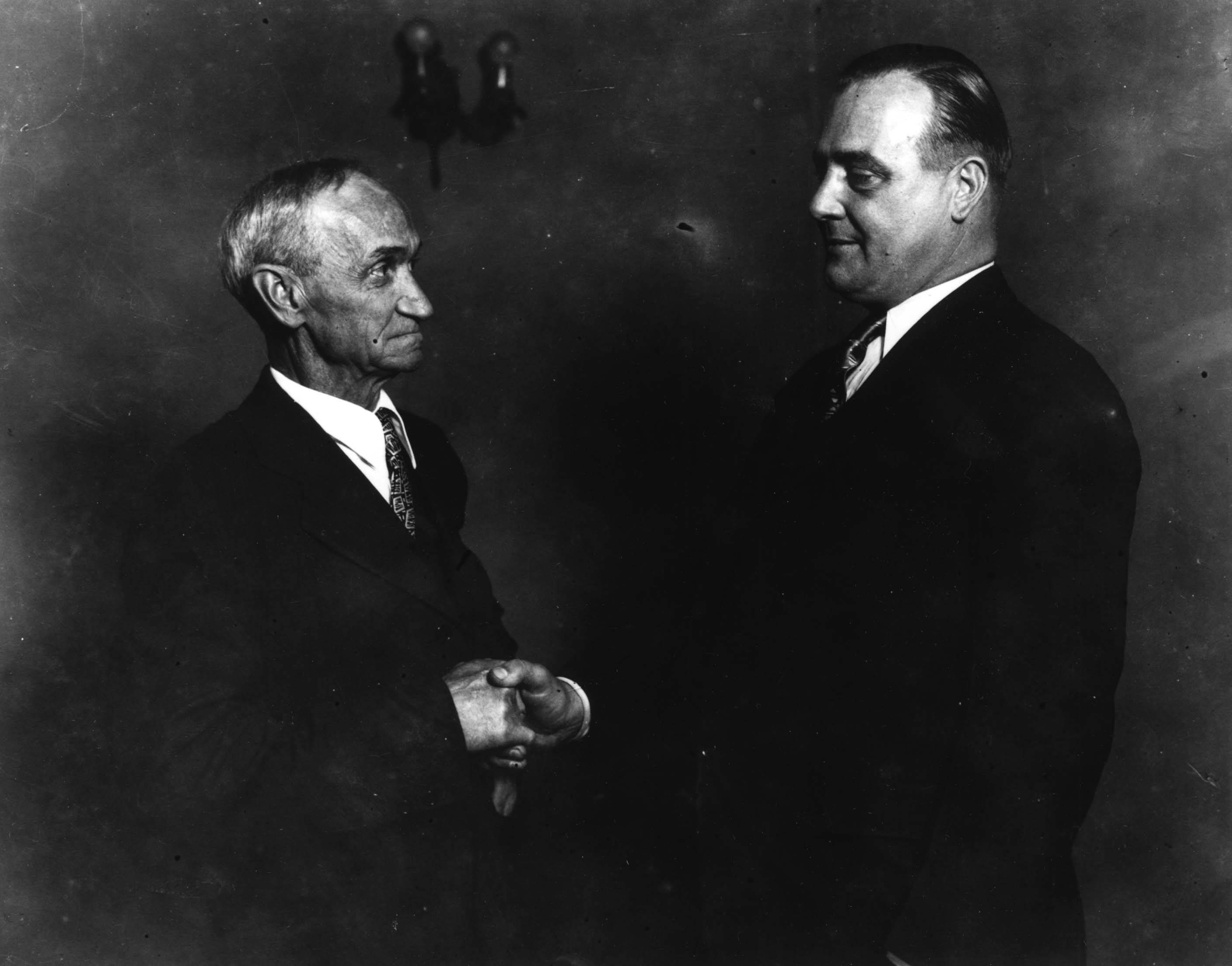
Dale's inauguration as mayor, with his predecessor John C. Hampton

Dale was inaugurated as the sixteenth mayor of Muncie on January 6, 1930. He was the first Democratic mayor since Bunch had left office in 1919. In the outgoing city council, all thirteen members had been Republicans, but only one was re-elected. Dale replaced the entire police and fire departments within days of his inauguration, accusing them of campaigning against him. While the police officers formally resigned, the removal of the firefighters was more controversial, and the firefighters successfully sued. Most of his new police hires lacked experience in law enforcement.

Upon Dale's inauguration, several gambling establishments closed. In the first week of the administration, the new police chief, Frank C. Massey, declared that these would remain closed, and the police arrested several people for bootlegging. Municipal judge J. Frank Mann ordered the release of several people arrested for bootlegging or gambling, saying the arrests had violated due process. Dale then ordered that suspects instead be tried by the justice of the peace of Center Township, but ceased after Circuit Court judge Leonidas Guthrie ruled that this official lacked jurisdiction. In an editorial in January 1931, Dale said that his fight against vice had been successful despite Mann. Disputes between Dale and Mann continued; Dale told the police department not to comply with two of Mann's court rulings.

=== Council dynamics, legal cases, and impeachment ===
As mayor, Dale clashed with members of the city council, caused by the split within local Democrats as well as Dale's unyielding personality. Hubert L. "Bob" Parkinson—a rival of Dale who had previously run a competing newspaper—was elected as the council president. At the beginning of Dale's term, ten council members, including six Democrats, generally sided against him. Over the next year, Dale frequently appeared at council meetings, allowing reporters during the first few months. During one meeting, the council asked him to leave. Most of Dale's budget proposals were lower than those of his predecessor, but the council wished for them to be even lower.

In March 1930, the city's recently established aviation department, led by Abbott L. Johnson, requested funds for airport construction. The city council appropriated the funds, despite a petition against it with thousands of signatures. Dale was silent on the topic until he vetoed the funding, saying that the people of Muncie opposed it and that the city could not afford it. The city council did not override the veto, as two Democrats switched their votes to support Dale. The aviation department was abolished after Johnson and other members resigned. The land allocated for the airport was returned to Johnson, who opened Delaware County Regional Airport with private funding in September 1932.

Ten members of the city government, including Dale and Massey, were charged with violating Prohibition in March 1932. (Note: Twelve people had been accused violating Prohibition, but one was not tried and one was acquitted.) Dale told the U.S. Attorney General, William D. Mitchell, that he had been framed by "gamblers, bootleggers, and grafters". The District Court in Indianapolis ruled in May that Dale was guilty of allowing bootlegging at a police event and of bringing liquor to the 1930 Democratic state convention. Judge Robert C. Baltzell sentenced both him and Massey to eighteen years of prison and fines of $1,000. The Court of Appeals in Chicago upheld the decision. In September 1932, the city council impeached Dale and deemed the mayorship vacant as a felony conviction made him ineligible for holding office. It selected councilor Earl Everett to act as mayor, but courts concluded that Dale was the legitimate mayor. Dale unsuccessfully attempted to appeal to the U.S. Supreme Court. Instead, he received a presidential pardon in December by Franklin D. Roosevelt, who believed the trial had involved perjury, (Note: Roosevelt's pardon of Dale was the first presidential pardon to include a reason.) in December 1933. At the time of his pardon, Dale was at Johns Hopkins Hospital, Baltimore, being treated for an eye condition. Dale thus remained in office. Massey's conviction was overturned by the U.S. Supreme Court.

In the final two years of his five-year term, (Note: A March 1933 state law delayed elections by a year, increasing Dale's term from four to five years.) Dale generally had tepid support from a seven-seat majority of the council. They first agreed on a budget in 1933.

A case alleged that Dale had pressured city employees to contribute money for his legal fees. Dale's co-defendants were Lester E. Holloway, the city controller and Dale's son-in-law, (Note: Holloway would later be mayor.) and Carey A. Taughinbaugh, the city attorney. The editor of the Republican-aligned Muncie Morning Star, Frank E. Harrold, called it the Dale's administration biggest allegation yet. The Delaware County court convicted the defendants, but a judge brought in from Madison County dismissed the charges in July 1933. Sutton wrote in the Evening Press, "It is difficult for the average person to understand ... how one man ... could become embroiled so constantly and so consistently in trouble of one sort or another as Dale has been."

=== Public works ===
As Dale had campaigned against the Hampton administration's "paving trust", his board of works revoked contracts from four firms and gave them to other firms in early 1930. One of the dismissed pavers, William M. Birch, sued, and similar cases continued for the rest of Dale's mayorship. Dale said he had spoken with the trust's leader and had evidence to convict its members, but he did not make indictments.

Prior to the New Deal, Dale's efforts for public works projects were unsuccessful due to a lack of tax funding or legislative support. The council rejected his April 1930 proposal for a $100,000 bond issue for road maintenance in land recently annexed by the city. Dale replaced his board of works in June 1930, saying it had acted similarly to Hampton's government. This board proposed twenty-five projects, but only nine were approved by the end of the year; the Great Depression and existing distrust of the board of works intensified concerns about cost. Disputes about allocation of Indiana's gasoline tax fund contributed to delays.

Upon becoming mayor, Dale promised to cancel a planned sewage project on the White River, associating it with Hampton. He considered it too costly and said sewage should instead be reduced by limiting industrial dumping. Beginning on his first day in office, he and the city council clashed over this proposal. For the next two years, the secretary of the Indiana State Board of Health, William F. King, urged Dale to follow the state's anti-pollution regulations. He cited an October 1930 report saying the White River was non-potable. Parkinson sided with King but considered it impossible to convince Dale. The establishment of the federal Reconstruction Finance Corporation, followed by the Public Works Administration (PWA) in 1933, created a funding opportunity; Dale wished to fund the sewage project without raising taxes. Muncie applied for a PWA grant in November 1933 and was granted one million dollars, but the council stagnated for months. South Side residents, including Democratic councilor Clarence R. Hole, said that the project would unevenly benefit the North Side. Both daily newspapers supported it; they believed the council's enmity toward Dale hindered it. Fearing losing the funds, Dale appointed a committee of citizens in August 1934. Democratic councilor Emmett Grady proposed "that this thing be brought out and acted on, one way or the other" in November, but the motion failed. The PWA cancelled the grant the following month.

After the New Deal began, Dale applied for federal funds from the Civil Works Administration (CWA). His proposals included flood management on the White River, a swimming pool in Tuhey Park, and road surfacing. Harrold of the Morning Star usually opposed Dale but supported the CWA work for creating jobs. The Evening Press did not write about the topic, but Sutton opposed the White River construction, according to Dale. For the city to buy goods for CWA projects, Dale again proposed a $100,000 bond issue, which the city council unanimously supported in December 1933. However, the bonds had no buyers. Muncie only had one bank and one trust company, both controlled by the Ball family. Local bankers did not want the bonds due to the low interest rate and concerns that the city could not raise taxes enough to pay them back. Dale said they "[sold] Muncie short", and Holloway later recalled that they "were not about to do anything that would help the Dale administration". Holloway found a buyer in February 1934, selling $36,000 of bonds to the trustees of the pension fund for the city's fire and police departments; the rest went to the C. W. McNear Bonding Company. By the end of the program in 1934, the CWA had employed over 1,600 men and spent $407,976 ($9.82 million in 2025) in the Muncie area.

=== Failed re-election campaign ===
Dale ran for re-election as mayor in 1934, running against Bunch in the primary. Bunch was popular, and Dale had lost popularity due to his legal battles and feuds with the city council. Dale was less involved in campaigning than he had been during his first election, as a result of his declining health. Bunch defeated Dale with 78.8% of the vote, winning every precinct. Despite rumors to the contrary, Dale accepted the result. Bunch succeeded him as mayor on January 1, 1935. When Dale left office, both of Muncie's Republican newspapers wrote that he had made some positive contributions during his term.

== Later life, death, and legacy ==
Dale continued to run the Post-Democrat until his death, writing criticisms of the Bunch administration. He died suddenly in his bed in Muncie after midnight on March 27, 1936. His death was listed as a cerebral hemorrhage. His wife Lena succeeded him as the editor of the Post-Democrat.

Historians and sociologists have praised Dale's resistance of the KKK. Obituaries in The New York Times and Time Magazine mentioned the reports of attacks by KKK members. In the Middletown studies by Dale's friends Robert and Helen Lynd, he was the only person whose real name was used; the second study, Middletown in Transition (1937), described his resistance of the KKK as "almost single-handed". Some scholars have credited Dale with limiting the political power of the Ball family. According to Ron F. Smith, "Because so much attention has been paid to Dale's fight with the Klan, his real mission in Muncie has been largely overlooked."

== See also ==
- List of people pardoned or granted clemency by the president of the United States
