= Winona College =

Winona College was a university college in Winona Lake, Indiana. It was founded somewhere between 1902 and 1905. It consisted of a Liberal Arts College and the Winona Agricultural and Technical Institute with the college and the Agricultural Institute at Winona Lake and the Winona Technical Institute at Indianapolis.

Founded by John Breckenridge, its last graduating class was that of 1917. Although in the same town, it is not organically connected with Grace College & Seminary, an evangelical Christian college affiliated with the Fellowship of Grace Brethren Churches.

== Notable alumni ==
- Edwin William Schultz, (1888–1971), former Head of the Department of Bacteriology and Experimental Pathology, Stanford University
- Clarence Hickman (1889–1981), inventor and contributor to the design of the bazooka during World War II and magnetic recording after the war, received a BA from Winona College
- Jules LaDuron (1893–1980), medical doctor
