= List of mayors of Muncie, Indiana =

The Mayor of Muncie is the leader of the municipal government of Muncie, Indiana. The first mayor was John Brady in 1865. The term of office is four years. Prior to Edward Tuhey in 1910, the term was two years. George R. Dale served five years as a result of the "skip election" law, passed by the Indiana General Assembly in March 1933, delaying elections by twelve months.

Some mayors have been related to others: John Brady was the grandfather of Arthur W. Brady, Edward Tuhey was the father of H. Arthur Tuhey, John C. Hampton was the father of John V. Hampton, George R. Dale was the father-in-law of Lester E. Holloway. The youngest mayor, as of 2015, was Charles W. Kilgore.

== Mayors ==
#	Name	Term start	Term end	Party
1	John Brady (1803–1884; aged 80)	1865	1867	Republican
2	Job Swain (1806–1877; aged 71)	1867	1869	Republican
3	Marcus C. Smith (1825–1900; aged 74)	1869	1877	Republican
4	William F. Jones (1st) (1813–1890; aged 77)	1877	1879	Republican
5	Charles W. Kilgore (1855–1919; aged 64)	1879	1881	Democratic
—	William F. Jones (2nd)	1881	1883	Republican
6	Frank Ellis (1842–1919; aged 77)	1883	1891	Republican
7	Arthur W. Brady (1865–1933; aged 68)	1891	1895	Democratic
8	George W. Cromer (1856–1936; aged 80)	1895	1899	Republican
9	Edward Tuhey (1st) (1856–1933; aged 77)	1899	1902	Democratic
10	Charles W. Sherritt (1854–1910; aged 56)	1902	1906	Republican
11	Leonidas Guthrie (1875–1964; aged 89)	1906	1910	Republican
—	Edward Tuhey (2nd)	1910	1914	Democratic
12	Rollin H. Bunch (1st) (1881–1948; aged 66)	1914	1919 (resigned)	Democratic
13	John Kelly (1882–1946; aged 64)	1919	1922	Democratic
14	John C. Quick (1862–1929; aged 66)	1922	1926	Republican
15	John C. Hampton (1st) (1891–1949; aged 58)	1926	January 6, 1930	Republican
16	George R. Dale (1867–1936; aged 69)	January 6, 1930	January 1, 1935	Democratic
—	Rollin H. Bunch (2nd)	January 1, 1935	1939	Democratic
17	Ira J. Wilson (1885–1943; aged 57)	1939	1943	Republican
—	John C. Hampton (2nd)	1943	1948	Republican
18	Lester E. Holloway (1904–1991; aged 87)	1948	1952	Democratic
19	Joseph R. Barclay (1880–1957; aged 76)	1952	1956	Republican
20	H. Arthur Tuhey (1896–1966; aged 70)	1956	1964	Democratic
21	John V. Hampton (1929–1997; aged 68)	1964	1968	Republican
22	Paul J. Cooley (1914–2007; aged 92)	1968	1976	Democratic
23	Robert G. Cunningham (1927–2005; aged 77)	1976	1980	Democratic
24	Alan K. Wilson (born in 1942; age 82)	1980	1984	Republican
25	James P. Carey (1926–2006; aged 79)	1984	1992	Democratic
26	David M. Dominick (born in 1960; age 64)	1992	1996	Republican
27	Daniel Canan (born in 1953; age 71)	1996	2008	Republican
28	Sharon McShurley (born in 1962; age 62)	2008	December 31, 2011	Republican
29	Dennis Tyler (born in 1942; age 82)	January 1, 2012	December 31, 2019	Democratic
30	Dan Ridenour (born in 1959; age 65)	January 1, 2020		Republican
