= Heady Lane Cemetery =

Family cemetery in Fishers, Indiana, US

Coordinates: 39.963915°N 86.033016°W

- Heady headstone
- Interactive map of Heady Lane Cemetery

Details
- Location: Fishers, Indiana

Heady Lane Cemetery is a family cemetery from the early 19th century located in Fishers, Indiana. It is reportedly haunted.

== History ==
The cemetery dates back to the early 19th century and has headstones for many members of the Heady family in it.

An 1866 map of Delaware Township shows Delaware Township School No. 2 located on the northeast corner of 126th & Allisonville Road. This is the school attributed to the legend. No further information about the fire has been found thus far.

== See also ==
- Conner Prairie
