= Bailly Cemetery =

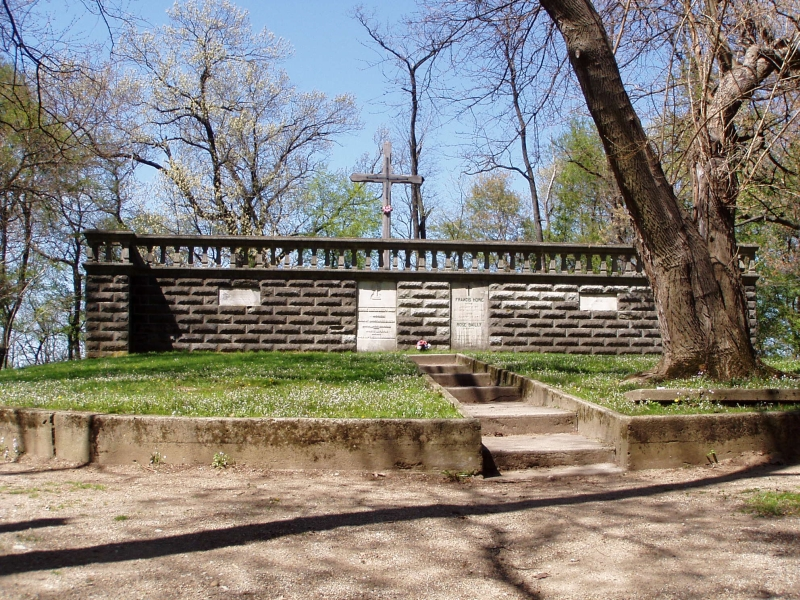
- Bailly Cemetery on a bluff that once overlooked Lake Michigan
- Interactive map of Bailly Cemetery

Details
- Established: 1827
- Location: Indiana Dunes National Park, Porter, Indiana
- Country: United States
- Coordinates: 41.632778°N 87.090833°W
- Type: U.S. Government
- Owned by: National Park Service, Department of the Interior
- Size: 1 acre (4,000 m^{2})
- No. of graves: 12–20
- Find a Grave: Bailly Cemetery

Bailly Cemetery is a cemetery located at Indiana Dunes National Park in Porter, Indiana, US. The cemetery is three-quarters of a mile (1.2 km) north of the Joseph Bailly Homestead on the edge of a sand ridge. The first recorded burial was Robert, the son of Joseph Bailly, in about 1827. Subsequently, the site has been considered a family graveyard. Burials of those outside the Bailly family are numerous. Today, they are all unmarked, including Swedish residents of the area. Outside the cemetery platform to the north there are eight recorded tombstones, four of which are older than 1827: Isaac Schellinger, 1811; Peter Carlbon, 1814; Rhoda Schellinger, 1816; and Thomas B. Speer, 1817.

== Cemetery history ==
In 1827, Joseph Bailly chose the sand hill as a resting place for his son Robert. He placed a thirty-foot wooden cross near the grave which travelers on the nearby trail could easily view. Why he buried his son on this hill, three-fourths of a mile from the home, can only be speculated. Perhaps he did so because it had already been used for burials. More likely, since he marked the place with a large cross, he chose the highest point in the area.

The entire Joseph Bailly family is interred in this cemetery. There are also a stepdaughter, son-in-law, and several grandchildren. In the early years, the Swedish community also used this site as a cemetery, until Rose Bailly Howe restricted it to the Bailly family after 1866. Rose Howe had the grounds enclosed with a wooden fence around 1867. In 1885 she had a six-foot (1.8 m) limestone wall topped with iron spikes erected. Access was through an iron gate on the south side. On the inside walls, three boxes with rounded tops were included with the stations of the cross. An altar was built in the southeast corner. A cross had been erected in the center of the cemetery by Joseph Bailly in 1827.

By 1914, Miss Frances R. Howe worried about entry into the cemetery and had Theodore Stephens of Chesterton construct a concrete block wall around the old one. Stairs at the northeast end lead up to the top and a stone railing with ornamental coping was erected. The interior of the cemetery was filled with sand. Memorial plaques were moved from inside the walls to the outside at the southwest end. The entire raised platform was encircled by a concrete retaining wall and driveway. During construction, numerous unmarked graves were discovered and moved just outside the new construction.

== Sources ==
- BAILLY CEMETERY, at Baileytown near Porter, Westchester Township, Porter County Indiana; Cemetery of the Pioneer family of HONORE GRATIEN JOSEPH BAILLY de MESSEIN and Marie LeFevre; Burials 1827 to 1918; Olga Mae Schiemann; Chicago, Illinois; 1952 (Manuscript)
- The Bailly Cemetery; C.W. Nelson; Chesterton Tribune, December 22, 1949
