= Beech Grove Cemetery (Muncie, Indiana) =

- U.S. National Register of Historic Places
- U.S. Historic district
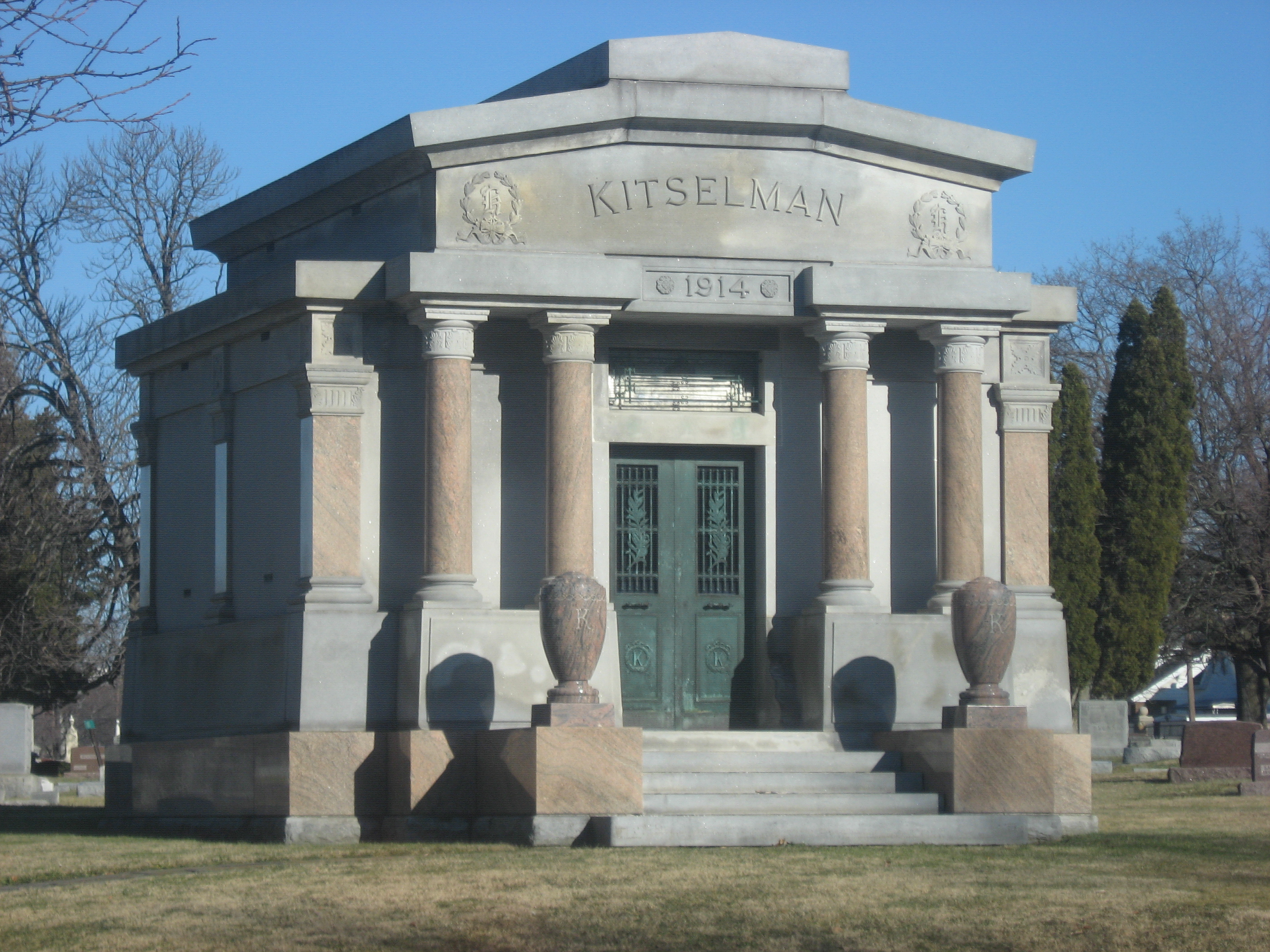
- A mausoleum at the cemetery

- Location within Indiana Location within the United States
- Location: 1400 W. Kilgore Ave. Muncie, Indiana
- Coordinates: 40°11′20″N 85°24′20″W
- Area: 105 acres (42 ha)
- Built: 1841
- Architect: Cuno Kibele; Marshall S. Mahurin
- Architectural style: Gothic Revival
- NRHP reference No.: 99000734
- Added to NRHP: June 25, 1999

Beech Grove Cemetery is a large historical cemetery and national historic district located at Muncie, Indiana. It was listed on the National Register of Historic Places in 1999.

== Background information ==
Beech Grove Cemetery was established in 1841 and is a municipal facility supported by a combination of private and public funding. The entrance gate, completed in 1904, was designed by architect Marshall S. Mahurin. The Gothic Revival style administration building was added in 1921–1923. It was renovated in 1974 and redecorated in 1991. The earliest mausoleum dates to 1904.

The cemetery is governed by a board of directors, whose members are appointed by the Muncie City Council. The Muncie Public Library is partnered with the Beech Grove Cemetery and has an online database of all their burials. It is a part of the Muncie / Delaware County Digital Resource Library. There are over 42,000 burials.

== Notable burials ==
- John Ottis Adams (1851–1927), artist
- The five Ball Brothers, founders of the Ball Corporation
- William J. Carson (1840−1913), Civil War Medal of Honor recipient
- Congressman George W. Cromer (1856–1936)
- Congressman Andrew Kennedy (1810–1847)
- Anna Augusta Truitt (1837–1920), philanthropist, temperance reformer, essayist
- Jules LaDuron (1893–1980), physician and football player

== See also ==
- List of cemeteries in Indiana
