= The Star Press =

Newspaper in Muncie, Indiana

- Type: Daily newspaper
- Owner: USA Today Co.
- Publisher: Maribel Perez Wadsworth
- Editor: Nicole Carroll
- Founded: 1860 (as Delaware County Times)
- Language: English
- Headquarters: Muncie, Indiana, United States
- Website: thestarpress.com

The Star Press is a morning edition newspaper for Muncie, Indiana, and surrounding areas.

== History ==
In 1860, Nathaniel Fuller Ethell founded the weekly newspaper Delaware County Times. The paper sometime around 1865 was renamed to Muncie Daily Times. In 1869 the paper was sold to Thomas Brady. In 1900, the paper was renamed to the Muncie Evening Times.

In 1875, the evening newspaper Muncie Daily Herald was founded and was merged in 1906 with Muncie Evening Times to form Muncie Evening Press.

In 1872, the morning newspaper Liberal was founded and was bought by Ethell a year later. He renamed it to Muncie Daily News and sold it in 1985 to Charles Neely, who later renamed it Muncie Morning News.

In 1899, George McCulloch launched the Muncie Morning Star. In 1901, McCulloch bought Muncie Morning News and absorbed it into his paper. In 1904, he sold his company to John C. Shaffer. After Shaffer died in 1944, the newspapers were sold to Eugene C. Pullam's company Central Newspapers, Inc. The company merged the two papers in 1996 to form The Star Press. In 2000, the company was acquired by Gannett.

In June 2024, the newspaper announced it will switch from carrier to postal delivery.
