= Minnetrista Boulevard Historic District =

Historic district in Indiana, United States

- U.S. National Register of Historic Places
- U.S. Historic district
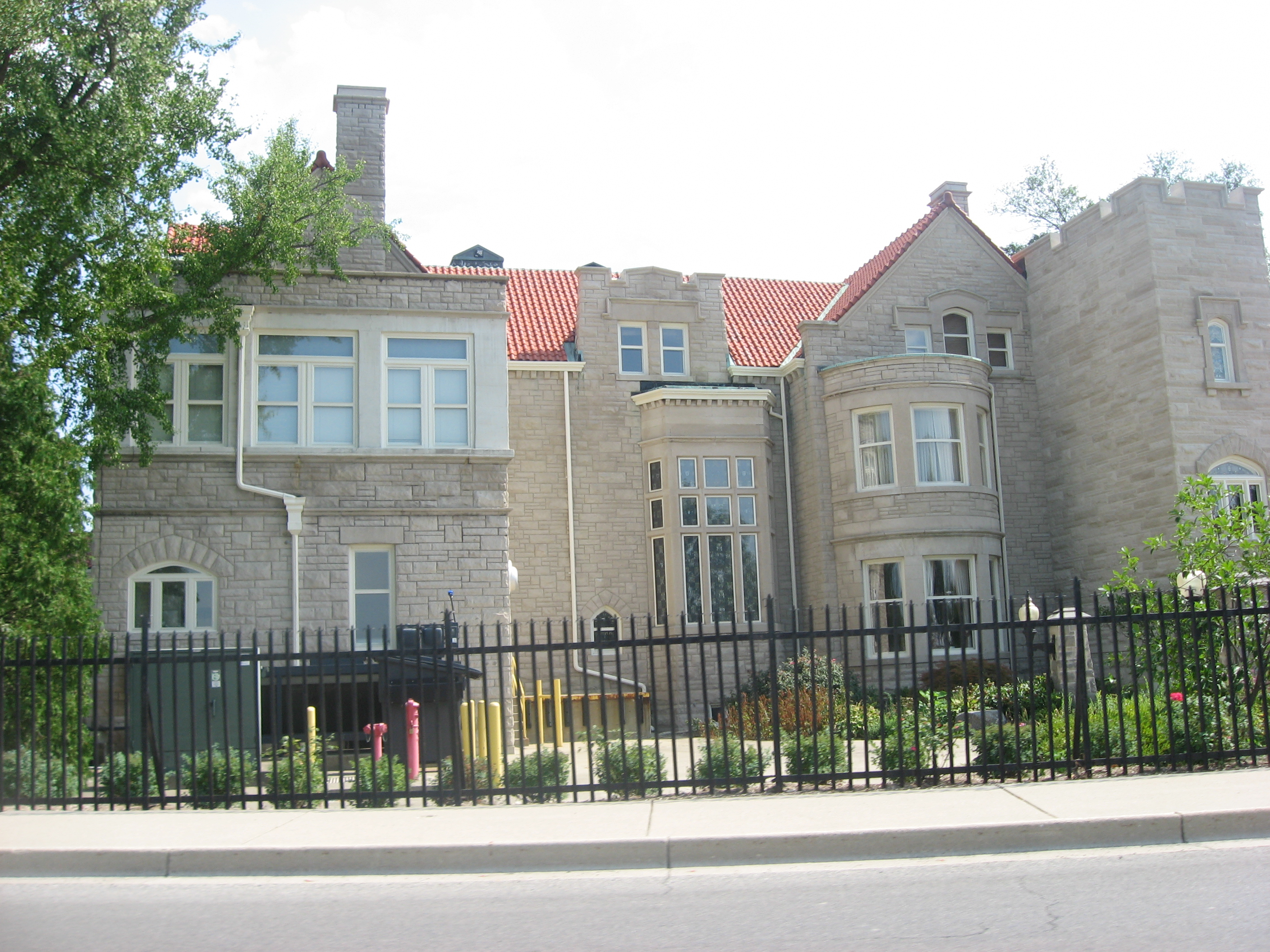
- "Nebosham" — Edmund and Bertha Ball House.

- Location within Indiana Location within the United States
- Location: 400-650 Minnetrista Boulevard, Muncie, Indiana
- Coordinates: 40°12′13″N 85°23′30″W
- Area: 9.1 acres (3.7 ha)
- Built: 1895
- Architect: Gibson, Louis Henry; Mahurin, Marshall S.; Kibele, Cuno
- Architectural style: Shingle Style, Tudor Revival, Colonial Revival
- NRHP reference No.: 12000184
- Added to NRHP: April 10, 2012

Minnetrista Boulevard Historic District is a national historic district in the city of Muncie, Indiana. It is located along the northeast side of Minnetrista Boulevard and the north bank of the White River, about a mile north of downtown Muncie.

== Description ==
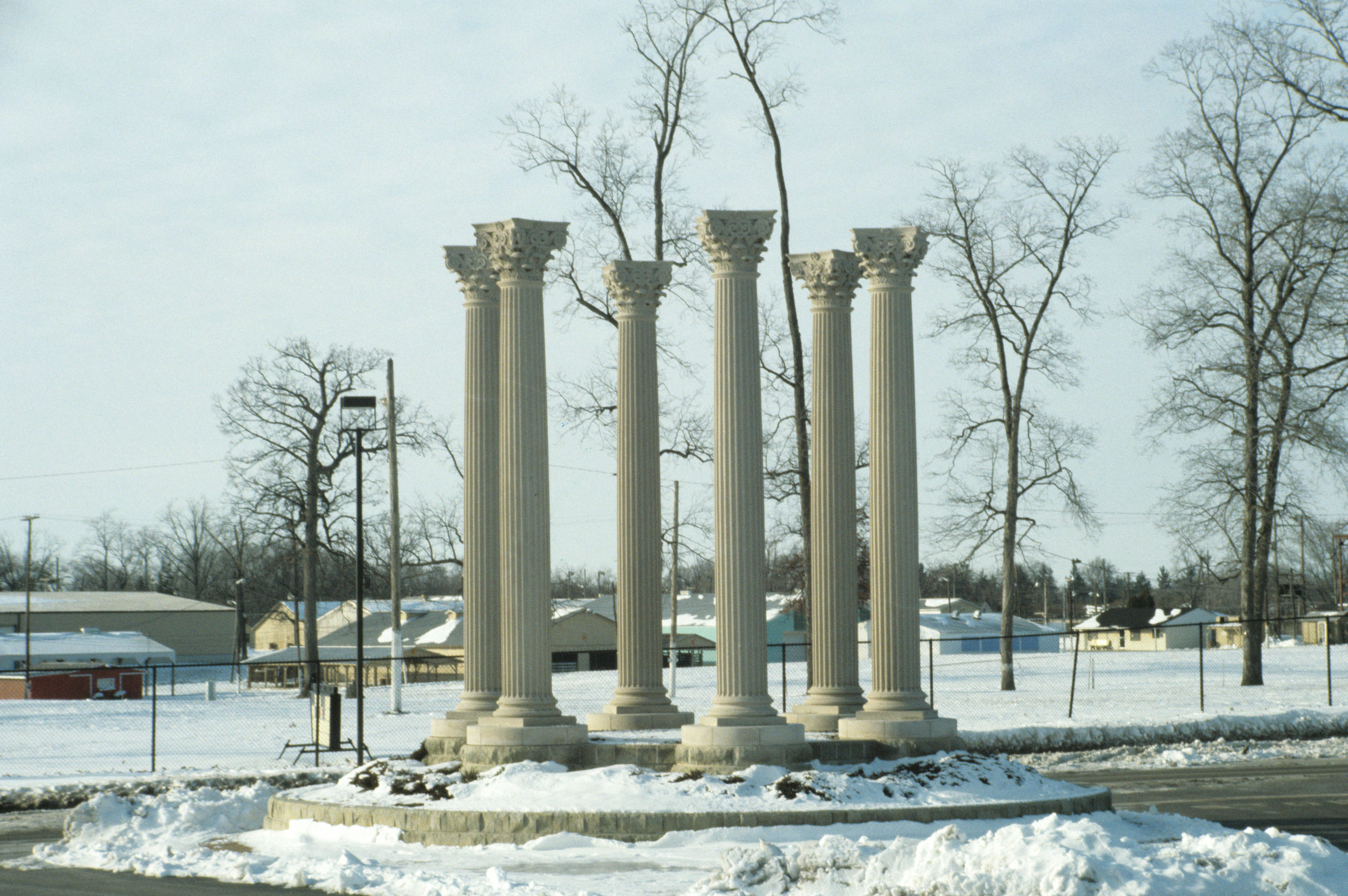
Minnetrista Boulevard Sculptures in Muncie Indiana

The historic district encompasses five distinguished homes and their associated secondary structures, in a predominantly residential section of Muncie. The district developed between c.1895 and 1910, and includes notable examples of Shingle style, Tudor Revival, Georgian Revival, and Colonial Revival style architecture.

It was added to the National Register of Historic Places in 2012.

=== Contributing properties ===
The principal residences in the district are:

- "Nebosham" — Edmund and Bertha Ball House, 1907 Tudor Revival and Gothic Revival style residence designed by Wing & Mahurin, part of present-day Ball State University facility.
- "Maplewood" — William and Emma Ball House, 1899 Georgian Revival style residence with Greek Revival portico, and present day guesthouse for the Ball Corporation, with its first floor a historic house museum of the Minnetrista cultural complex.
- "Oakhurst" — George and Frances Ball House, 1895 Shingle style residence designed by Louis Gibson.
- Lucius and Sarah Ball House — c. 1875 farmhouse, remodeled/enlarged in Colonial Revival style by Balls in 1908, present day orientation center for the Minnetrista cultural complex.
- Mary Lincoln Cottage — 1907 Late Victorian style house.
- "Minnetrista" (residence site) — former Frank and Elizabeth Ball House, 1894 mansion designed by Louis Gibson and destroyed by fire in 1967. Present day site of the 1988 Center Building housing the Minnetrista Heritage Collection.

Minnetrista

Minnetrista is a cultural center is within the district on three former Ball Brothers properties, with museums, gardens, a sculpture park, and natural areas. It includes the "Oakhurst" mansion and historic gardens, the Lucius and Sarah Ball residence, and the surviving limestone columns of "Minnetrista" in the Colonnade Garden.

The Ball family, founders of the Ball Corporation, purchased most of the land along the north bank of White River between Wheeling and Granville Pikes in 1893. The name chosen by the family for the property was taken from a Sioux word, "mna" (pronounced mini) which means "water," and combined with the English word, "tryst," to form "Minnetrista," or, "a gathering place by the water."

== See also ==
- National Register of Historic Places in Muncie, Indiana
- Historic districts in Indiana
- National Register of Historic Places listings in Delaware County, Indiana

== See also ==
- Minnetrista.net: Gardens of Minnetrista — the 23 gardens and restored natural landscapes at Minnetrista.
