= Ball brothers =

American industrialists and philanthropists

- From left to right: William, Frank, Lucius (seated), Edmund, and George Ball
- Known for: Ball Corporation; Ball State University; Ball Memorial Hospital

The Ball brothers from left to right: George A. Ball, Lucius L. Ball, Frank C. Ball, Edmund B. Ball, and William C. Ball

The Ball brothers (Lucius, William, Edmund, Frank, and George) were five American industrialists and philanthropists who in 1880 established a glass manufacturing business in New York and prospered hugely from their mass production of home canning jars, sometimes known as "Ball jars". In 1888, they moved their glass manufacturing operations from Buffalo, New York, to Muncie, Indiana, due to the abundance of natural gas in the area. By 1937, the value of the company was estimated at nearly $7 million ($157 million in 2025). The family also owned other profitable businesses in Muncie and elsewhere.

The brothers were noted for their philanthropy and community service. Earnings from their business ventures provided the financial resources to support a number of civic building projects and large charitable gifts to their home city. Most notably, the brothers became benefactors of several Muncie institutions including Ball State University, Ball Memorial Hospital, Keuka College, the YMCA, and the YWCA. The Ball Brothers Foundation, established in 1926, continues the family's philanthropic interests.

The family firm was renamed the Ball Corporation in 1969, becoming a global manufacturer of plastic and metal containers for food and beverages, as well as a manufacturer of equipment and supplier of services to the aerospace industry.

== Early life and family ==
The family descends from an early colonial immigrant, Edward Ball, and several other founders of Newark, New Jersey.

The Ball brothers' parents, Lucius Styles Ball, a farmer and merchant, and Maria Polly Bingham Ball, a former schoolteacher, were born in Canada. They met in Greensburg, Ohio, and married on September 1, 1846. Lucius and Maria had a total of eight children, six sons and two daughters: Lucina Amelia, Lucius Lorenzo, William Charles, Edmund Burke, Frank Clayton, Mary Frances, George Alexander, and Clinton Harvey (died in infancy). The children were raised in eastern Ohio and in upstate New York.

The boys' sister, Lucina, was an educator who assisted in the founding of Drexel Institute in Philadelphia, Pennsylvania, and served as its financial secretary. Their other sister, Mary Frances, married Joseph W. Mauck, who became a longtime president of Hillsdale College in Hillsdale, Michigan. Their uncle, George Harvey Ball, who shared the Ball family dedication to higher education, founded Keuka College in upstate New York in 1890. When their father became ill, the Ball brothers "found a friend and confidant" in their uncle. After the boys' father died in 1878, Uncle George provided financial support and some measure of stability. Later in life, after the Ball brothers had become wealthy businessmen, they became benefactors to their uncle's college.

The surviving Ball family homes are preserved in the Minnetrista Boulevard Historic District:

House	Ball Brother	Married	Children
L.L. Ball home	Lucius Lorenzo Ball (1850–1932)	In 1893 to Sarah Rogers (1857–1935)	Helen
Maplewood	William Charles Ball (1852–1921)	In 1890 to Emma Wood (1855–1942)	William
Nebosham	Edmund Burke Ball (1855–1925)	In 1903 to Bertha Crosley (1875–1957)	Edmund, Clinton, Adelia, Janice
Minnetrista	Frank Clayton Ball (1857–1943)	In 1893 to Elizabeth Wolfe Brady (1867–1944)	(Edmund) Arthur, Lucina, Margaret, Frank, Rosemary
Oakhurst	George Alexander Ball (1862–1955)	In 1893 to Frances Woodworth (1872–1958)	Elisabeth

== Lucius L. Ball ==
Lucius Lorenzo Ball (March 29, 1850 – July 22, 1932), the eldest of the brothers was born in Greensburg, Ohio. He grew up in Ohio and moved with the family to upstate New York, where he attended public schools and Canandaigua Academy at Canandaigua, New York.

Lucius, whose ambition was to become a doctor, received his medical degree from the University of Buffalo in 1889, at the age of forty, and served as the house physician in Adrian Hospital in Pennsylvania before establishing a medical practice in Buffalo, New York. He moved to Muncie, Indiana, in 1894. In addition to becoming a shareholder and serving on the board of the Ball brothers' manufacturing company, Lucius practiced medicine in the Muncie community. He was a member of the Scottish Rite and the Universalist church. Lucius also retained memberships in national and state medical societies and served as medical adviser to the Western Reserve Life Insurance Company.

Lucius married Sarah Rogers in 1893; they relocated from Buffalo to Muncie the following year. The couple had one daughter. Lucius remained a resident of Muncie for thirty years. In the mid-1990s, following the restoration of Oakhurst, George's home, Lucius's residence was renovated to serve as an orientation center for the Oakhurst mansion and its gardens.

== William C. Ball ==
William Charles Ball (August 13, 1852 – April 30, 1921) was born in Trumbull County, Ohio, grew up in upstate New York, and attended public school and Canandaigua Academy with his siblings. When two of his brothers, Frank and Edmund, moved to Indiana in the mid-1880s, William remained in Buffalo, New York, to close out business affairs. He moved to Muncie in 1897. William was a Ball company salesman and served as the corporation's secretary. Like his brothers, he was involved in Muncie's political and civic activities. William served on several boards, including the Muncie and Portland Traction Company, Merchants National Bank, and Hillsdale College. He was also a member of the Scottish Rite and the Universalist church.

William and his wife, Emma Wood, had one son. Their home in Muncie was a red brick Georgian design that they named Maplewood. Designed by John Scudder Adkins and completed in 1898, it was built on Ball family property just east of Oakhurst, George's home. William died at the age of sixty-nine.

== Edmund B. Ball ==
Edmund Burke Ball (October 27, 1855 – March 8, 1925) was cofounder of the Ball manufacturing business with his brother, Frank. Born in Greensburg, Ohio, he moved with his family to upstate New York, where he attended public schools and Canandaigua Academy. In the mid-1880s Edmund relocated from Buffalo, New York, to Muncie, Indiana, where he served as vice president and general manager of the company, and as treasurer and secretary of the Ball brothers' corporation. Edmund was also a humanitarian and heavily involved in Muncie's civic activities. He was chair of Muncie's park board and the city's planning commission. He served on several other boards that included traction companies and banks, Muncie's hospital, and Hillsdale College. Edmund and his wife, Bertha, donated funds to renovate property on Tippecanoe Lake in Kosciusko County, Indiana, for a Young Men's Christian Association (YMCA) boys' camp. He was also a member of the Universalist church and a Scottish Rite Mason.

Edmund married Bertha Crosley on October 7, 1903, in Indianapolis. They had four children, two sons and two daughters. In 1904 Edmund hired Marshall S. Mahurin, a Fort Wayne, Indiana, architect to design his Gothic-Revival style home in Muncie. The family's home, named Nebosham, was completed in 1907 and served as their residence for fifty years. Following Edmund's death, $3.3 million in assets from his estate were used to establish the Ball Brothers Foundation. In 1975 the Ball Foundation donated Nebosham to the Ball State University Foundation for use as a continuing education facility. It was named the E. B. and Bertha C. Ball Center for University and Community Programs in 1986.

== Frank C. Ball ==
Frank Clayton Ball (November 24, 1857 – March 19, 1943) was a cofounder of the Ball family business with his brother Edmund. Born in Greensburg, Ohio, Frank grew up in Ohio and upstate New York. He attended public schools and Canandaigua Academy. He became company president in 1888 and served in that capacity for fifty five years. Frank was "a born leader" as well as "a strong, dynamic, and shrewd businessman." Like his brothers, Frank took an interest in the public affairs of the Muncie community. He was president of the Muncie and Portland Traction Company, the Muncie and Western Railroad Company, and the Muncie YMCA. He also served as director the Federal Reserve Bank of Chicago, among his other activities in business and civic organizations. Frank was a Scottish Rite Mason and a member of the Universalist church.

Frank married Elizabeth Wolfe Brady in 1893. They had five children, three daughters and two sons. In 1893–94 Frank bought approximately 30 acres (12 hectares) of land along the north bank of the White River, outside Muncie, where he built a home designed by Indianapolis architect Louis Gibson. Frank's nineteen-room mansion, named Minnetrista, was the first Ball family home to be built on the site along Minnetrista Boulevard. The home, completed in 1895, was destroyed by fire in 1967. Minnetrista, Muncie's cultural arts center, was built on the site of his former home.

== George A. Ball ==
George Alexander Ball (November 5, 1862 – October 22, 1955), youngest of the Ball brothers, was born in Trumball County, Ohio, and grew up in upstate New York. He attended public schools and Canandaigua Academy. George's interest in his brothers' glass manufacturing company was quickly identified after its inception; he joined the family business in 1883, at the age of twenty-one. George rose through the ranks in the family business. He worked as a bookkeeper and went on to become the corporation's secretary, treasurer, vice president, president, and board chairman. In the 1930s George became a partner in a railroad empire that also included steamship lines, grain elevators, bus and truck lines, coal mines, and a fruit orchard in Georgia. In addition, he served on the boards of organizations that included Borg Warner, Nickel Plate Railroad, several banking institutions, Indiana University, Ball State Teachers College (which became Ball State University), and Ball Memorial Hospital, among others. George was also active in politics, serving as a Republican national committeeman from Indiana. He was a Freemason, a Rotary Club member, and joined the Presbyterian church.

George married to Frances Woodworth in Buffalo in 1893. The couple had one daughter, Elisabeth, born on December 26, 1897. Elisabeth, who never married, lived in her parents' home until her death on April 29, 1982, at the age of eighty-four. Oakhurst, the family's shingle-style residence, was built in 1895, becoming the second of the Ball brothers' homes to be erected on the family property in Muncie. Indianapolis architect Louis Gibson designed the estate home on Minnetrista Boulevard. At the time of its construction the three-story residence stood on approximately 2 acres (0.81 hectares) of land. George died in 1955 at the age of ninety-two. The Ball Brothers Foundation deeded his home and its grounds to the Minnetrista cultural center, restoring it in 1990.

Aside from his business interests, George was a collector of children's literature, a hobby he shared with his daughter. In 1964 Elisabeth Ball donated a part of their collection to the Pierpont Morgan Library in New York. Following her death in 1982, other books that she and her father had collected were donated to the Lilly Library at Indiana University in Bloomington, Indiana, and the Bracken Library at Ball State University in Muncie, Indiana.

== Manufacturing business ==
Frank and Edmund Ball founded the Ball brothers' manufacturing business in 1880 in Buffalo, New York. Three other brothers (William, Lucius, and George) soon joined the family business. In 1887–88 the brothers moved their manufacturing operations to Muncie, Indiana, where the firm would be closer to an abundant natural gas supply. As the brothers' company continued to prosper and expand, it became especially well known for its glass canning jars, but diversified into other industries. Beginning in the 1950s, the Ball Corporation entered the aerospace sector, and later became a global manufacturer of plastic and metal food and beverage containers.

== Philanthropy ==
Due to the financial success of the Ball Corporation, the Ball brothers amassed considerable personal wealth and became influential men in Muncie's political and civic affairs. The Ball brothers made a number of philanthropic contributions to support the needs of the community and foster the city's growth, which included working with nonprofit agencies to provide aid to local and regional residents. The Ball Brothers Foundation, established in 1926, further expanded the impact of their philanthropic efforts. Eleven years later, in 1937, the George and Frances Ball Foundation was established to further the family's philanthropic efforts within Muncie and other locales of interest to the family.

Over the years the Ball brothers made financial contributions to establish or strengthen an abundance of institutions: the local branches of the YMCA and the YWCA, the Masonic Temple auditorium, the Art Museum at Ball State, Ball Memorial Hospital, Ball State University, and Minnetrista, Muncie's cultural center, and assisted other groups.

=== Ball Memorial Hospital ===
One of Ball Brothers Foundation's first projects was to establish Ball Memorial Hospital in Muncie. The hospital opened in 1929 and later affiliated with IU Health.

=== Minnetrista ===
In 1893 Frank C. Ball bought approximately 30 acres (12 hectares) of land along the north bank of the White River, outside Muncie, where the Ball family built their homes. His two sisters named the site Minnetrista, a combination of the Native American word for water, mine or minne, and the Middle English spelling of a word meaning a pre-arranged "gathering place", trist or tryst. Frank Ball's estate home, which was also called Minnetrista was the first to be built on the site in 1894; it burned in 1967. In 1988, a museum was built on the site as the city's cultural arts center. It preserves artifacts that document the history of Muncie and east central Indiana, and continues as a gathering place an important part of the Muncie, Indiana, community. Situated on 44 acres (18 hectares), visitors may still visit its gardens and natural areas, which contain an assorted community of native Indiana plant and animal species, for free.

=== Ball State University ===
Eastern Indiana Normal University, a small, private teacher training school that was a forerunner to Ball State University, opened in 1899 to help boost the development of the city of Muncie Indiana located in Delaware County, Indiana. The school opened to much fanfare after the dedication of the administration building on August 28, 1899. The school would go onto have a great first year with an enrollment of 250 students who were enrolled in one of eight programs offered by the school. Tuition was cheap compared to modern standards with a ten-week session costing students $10. Soon after that first year enrollment dropped to 110 and only 40 new students signed up The Eastern Indiana Normal University would close soon after on September 24, 1901.

After the college and subsequent efforts to established an institution of higher learning at Muncie had failed, with the financial help of George A. Ball, the assets of the Muncie National Institute, a former normal school that was then training hotel employees, were purchased and donated to the State of Indiana to become a branch of the Indiana State Normal School at Terre Haute known today as Indiana State University. In 1918 the school opened as the Indiana State Normal School, Eastern Division. In recognition of the Ball family's generosity, the school was named Ball Teachers College in 1922. The school became Ball State Teachers College in 1929 and was renamed Ball State University in 1965. Ball State is one of only a few public colleges in the United States that includes a family name.

=== Keuka College ===
Although the Ball brothers moved to Indiana early in their careers, they did not forget New York or the early support they received from their uncle, George Harvey Ball, founder of Keuka College, a private liberal arts-based and residential college based in the Finger Lakes region of upstate New York. After they became financially successful, the Ball brothers expressed their gratitude by donating additional land and providing funds to the college. In 1921 Ball Hall (Ball Memorial Hall) was named in honor of George Harvey Ball and the Ball brothers' contributions to the college.

=== Other contributions ===
The Ball brothers made other donations to support hospitals, schools, and nonprofit organizations. In Indiana these included funding for James Whitcomb Riley Hospital for Children in Indianapolis; Hanover College, in Hanover, Indiana; Indiana University; and the Lincoln Boyhood National Memorial at Lincoln City, Indiana. They also contributed to Hillsdale College in Hillsdale, Michigan.

== Ball Brothers Foundation ==
Grants from the Ball Brothers Foundation are awarded to organizations that demonstrate "better practices" or strive toward "best practice designation" in conducting their business and have continued interests in improving the quality of life for citizens of Indiana. The foundation looks to fund innovation, programs that are just starting, and companies going through expansion.

== Honors and tributes ==
In 1929 Edmund Ball's wife and children commissioned Cyrus Edwin Dallin to create a bronze casting of his original 1908 sculpture, Appeal to the Great Spirit. The replica was erected in Muncie in 1929 and donated to the city.

In September 1937 a bronze sculpture named Beneficence was installed on the Ball State University campus in Muncie to honor the Ball brothers' contribution to the community. The five columns of Indiana limestone that surround the sculpture represent the five Ball brothers.

However, despite all their contributions to the community, the pervasive influence of the Ball family on local politics and social issues was looked at rather skeptically, if not sneeringly, by the authors of the landmark Middletown studies, published in two volumes, 1929 and 1937.
