= Minnetrista Museum & Gardens =

Cultural center in Muncie, Indiana, U.S.

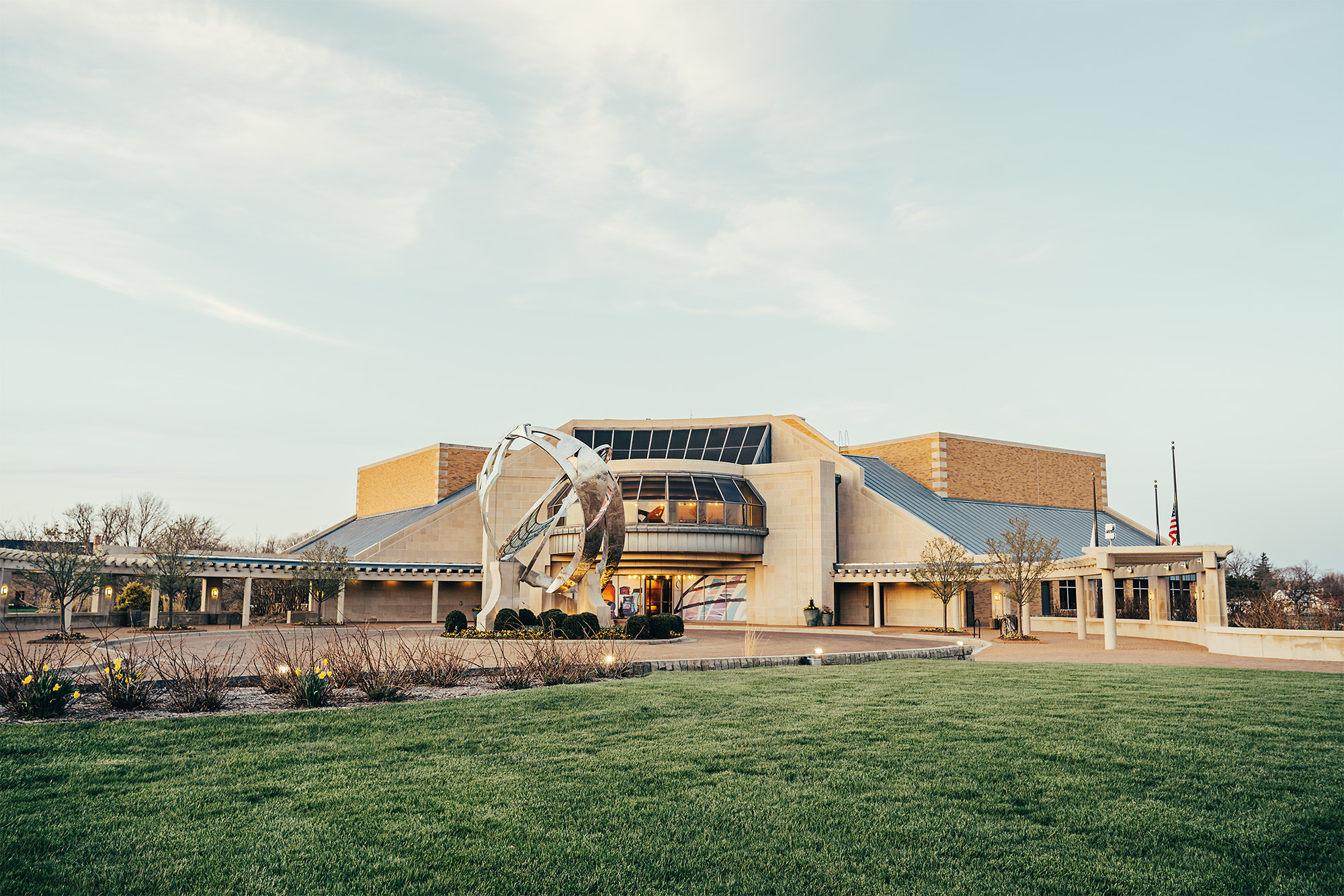
- Established: 10 December 1988
- Location: Muncie, Indiana
- Director: Brian Statz
- Public transit access: Muncie Indiana Transit System
- Parking: On site (no charge)
- Website: www.minnetrista.net

Minnetrista Museum & Gardens was founded in 1988. Built on the legacy of the Ball family and company, Minnetrista is a 40-acre (16 ha) museum and garden site located on the White River in Muncie, Indiana. The organization presents exhibits, nature trails, educational programs, and community events.

== Location and name ==
Minnetrista's 40-acre campus is located upon a bluff along the northern edge of the White River. Today, the site is home to modern museum facilities, five Gilded Age homes, the Minnetrista Boulevard Historic District (added to the National Register of Historic Places in 2012), and over 20 acres of cultivated greenspace, including horticultural and ornamental gardens. From the mid-1890s until the 1980s, Minnetrista was home to the extended Ball family, manufacturers of the Ball canning jar.

According to Ball family legend, members of the family suggested the name "Minnetrista" for the property. The word combines the Sioux (Dakota) word "mna" (pronounced "mini"), which means water, with the English word "tryst," which means a "gathering place."

Originally, the name Minnetrista was connected to one of the Ball family homes but today the entire site is very strongly associated with the word. Tied as it is to the Ball family history, the term "Minnetrista" does muddy this site's actual indigenous history, which is not directly connected to the Sioux. Today, Minnetrista Museum & Gardens strives to make this "gathering place by the water" an inclusive community resource for all the people of East Central Indiana and beyond.

== Early site history ==
On the northern bank of the White River, the site that is today Minnetrista existed on the outskirts of Muncie, Indiana throughout the nineteenth century. The city of Muncie was incorporated in 1865 to the south of the White River, developed out of the settlement of Munseetown founded just four decades earlier. That original settlement was built upon land opened to white settlers by the 1818 Treaty of St. Mary, which stripped Midwestern indigenous communities of their ancestral lands and forced their movement west of the Mississippi.

Prior to this, this part of East Central Indiana had long been home to the Potowatomi and the Miami. In the eighteenth century, part of the Minnetrista site itself was also home to a settlement of the Delaware Nation, who had been systematically driven farther west over many decades because of the advancement of white settlers. The Delaware too were forced to relocate in the first quarter of the nineteenth century, their communities resettling in Oklahoma, Wisconsin, and Canada.

== "Home of the Ball Jar" ==
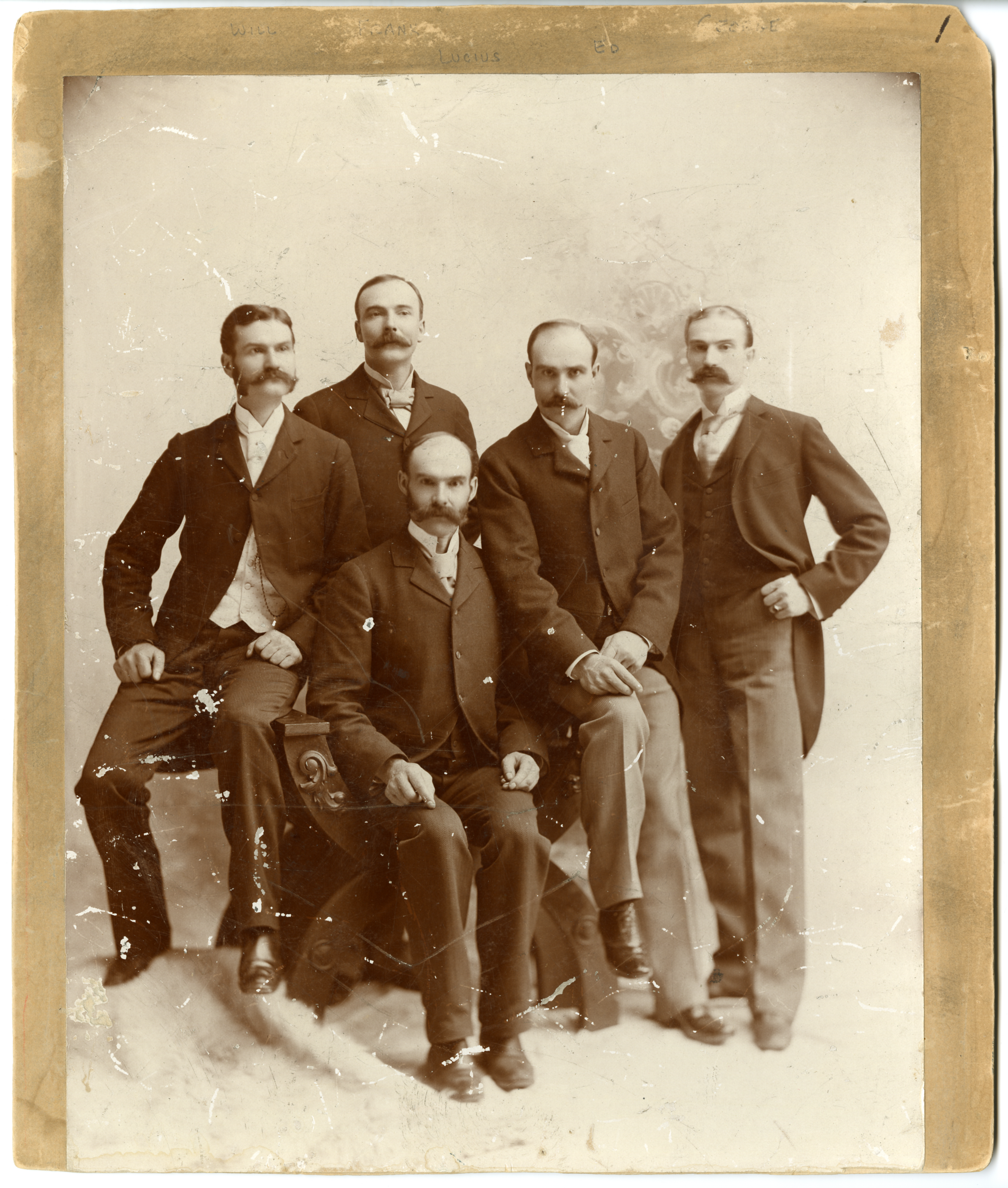
The Ball brothers

In the mid-1880s, the Ball family made the decision to move their commercial glass business, Ball Brothers Manufacturing Company, to Muncie. A local natural gas boom in East Central Indiana was then attracting a great deal of industrial business to the region, and the area's social character appealed to the family. In describing his first visit to Muncie in 1886, Frank C. Ball wrote in his memoirs, "There was nothing about the town that particularly appealed to me, but the men were all courteous, kind, and businesslike." By the early 1900s, the Ball brothers had expanded their glass business in Muncie into a large, well-respected firm, mass-producing canning jars and related items.

Between 1893 and 1907, the five Ball brothers each married and built their family homes side by side along the stretch of land they purchased on the north side of the White River. All but one of those homes still stands today. The Frank C. Ball family home, historically known as Minnetrista before the name was applied to the entire property, burned down in 1967. Today, Minnetrista Museum & Gardens oversees the care of three of those houses: Oakhurst, the Lucius L. Ball House, and the Mary Lincoln Cottage.

The Ball families at Minnetrista

House	Ball Brother	Married	Children
L.L. Ball home	Lucius Lorenzo Ball (1850–1932)	In 1893 to Sarah Rogers (1857–1935)	Helen
Maplewood	William Charles Ball (1852–1921)	In 1890 to Emma Wood (1855–1942)	William
Nebosham	Edmund Burke Ball (1855–1925)	In 1903 to Bertha Crosley (1875–1957)	Edmund, Clinton, Adelia, Janice
Minnetrista	Frank Clayton Ball (1857–1943)	In 1893 to Elizabeth Wolfe Brady (1867–1944)	(Edmund) Arthur, Lucina, Margaret, Frank, Rosemary
Oakhurst	George Alexander Ball (1862–1955)	In 1893 to Frances Woodworth (1872–1958)	Elisabeth

== The museum today ==
The Catalyst sculpture at Minnetrista

Members of the second generation of the Ball family began considering the idea of transforming the Minnetrista site into a public space in the late 1970s. Elisabeth Ball, the last member of the family to live full-time on the Boulevard, died in 1982, and plans were subsequently put in place to build a museum facility on the site of the former Frank C. Ball house (the original house was destroyed by fire in 1967) . Groundbreaking for the then Minnetrista Cultural Center began in March 1987 and the building opened to the public on December 10, 1988. The organization's name changed to Minnetrista Museum & Gardens in 2021.

Minnetrista is one of several legacy organizations founded by the Ball family that continue to serve the East Central Indiana community. Minnetrista's sister legacy organizations include: Ball State University, IU Health Ball Memorial Hospital, Ball Brothers Foundation, and the George and Frances Ball Foundation. As close collaborative community partners, the presence of these other organizations can be seen directly on the Minnetrista campus. For example, Ball State University Foundation owns and cares for the Nebosham house, now known as the Ed & Bertha C. Ball Center. In partnership with owners Ball Brothers Foundation, Maplewood home is offered as housing for advanced medical students studying at the Indiana University School of Medicine.

== Collections and archives ==
Minnetrista's Collections and Storytelling division collects, preserves, and provides access to materials documenting the history of the Ball company, Ball family, and East Central Indiana. The museum's collection is called the Heritage Collection.

Comprising more than 17,000 objects and 1,800 linear feet of archival materials, the Heritage Collection includes Ball company records and an extensive holding of Ball-made products. The collection also features artwork, other regionally manufactured goods, historic textiles, correspondence, photographs, and more.

Minnetrista is open to the public for research. Researchers are encouraged to explore the museum's online collections to learn more about its holdings.

== Exhibitions ==
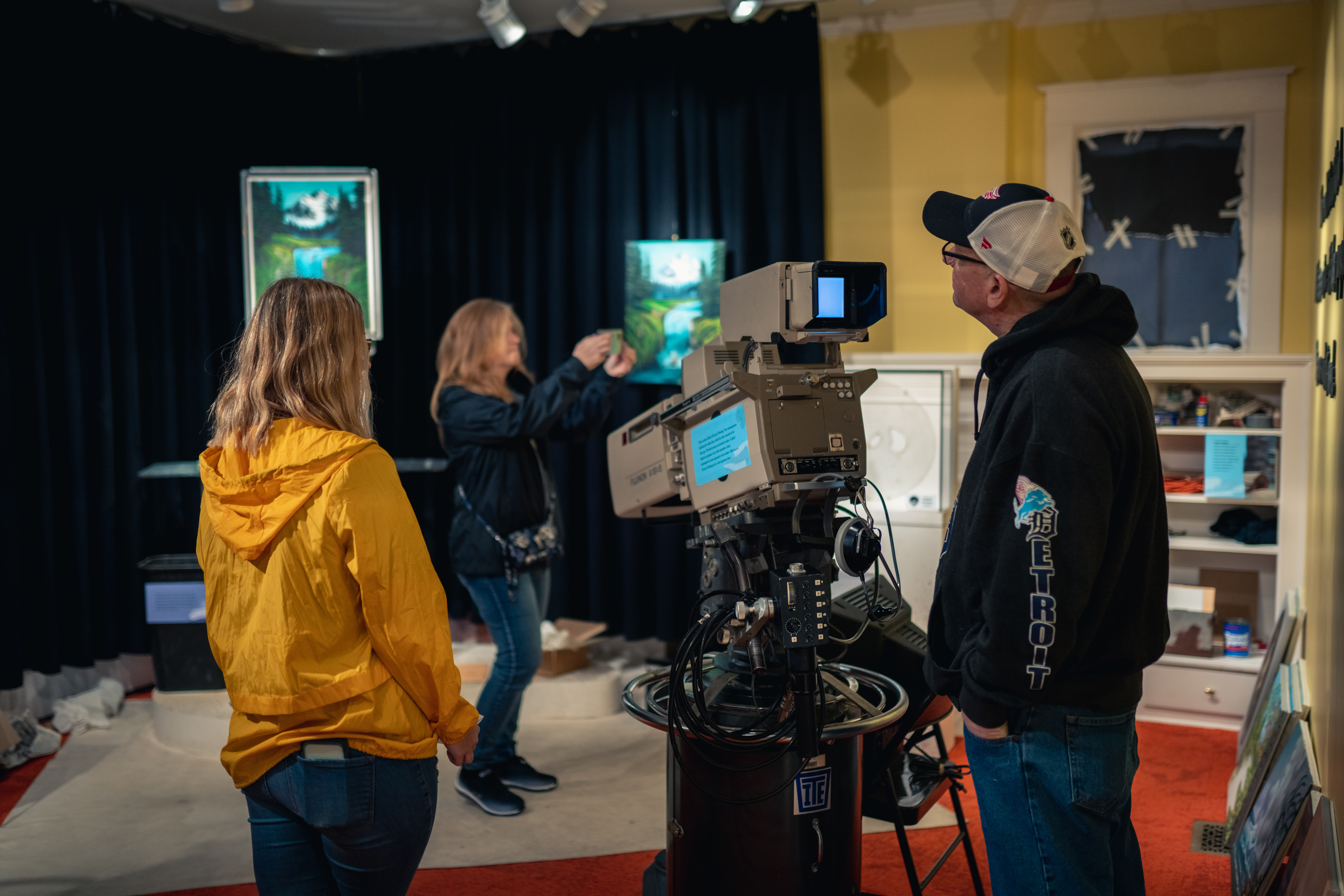
The Bob Ross Experience at Minnetrista

Minnetrista curates a regular annual rotation of art, history, and family-oriented exhibitions. In addition, the campus is home to several permanent exhibit offerings that tell the histories of life and events on the Minnetrista site, including:

- Oakhurst Experience: Opened to the public in 2019, the Oakhurst Experience is located in the historic Oakhurst Home that was once home to George and Frances Ball and their daughter Elisabeth. The Experience combines a traditional historic home offering with a vibrant celebration of the passions the family shared: literacy, family, and canning. Visitors can enjoy hundreds of books in the library of the house that once contained the largest collection of rare children's books in the world. And the kitchen is an ode to home food preservation, featuring interactives that teach about canning and preservation methods in the spot where the Ball Blue Book was created.
- Bob Ross Experience: Opened in 2020, the Bob Ross Experience is housed in the very space where The Joy of Painting was filmed—in the Lucius L. Ball home on the Minnetrista campus. The site-specific exhibit opens by telling the story of Bob Ross's relationship with Minnetrista and the organization's founder, Ed Ball, a second-generation Ball family member who was instrumental in helping to save Public Broadcasting Service (PBS) when funding was threatened in the 1970s. The exhibit consists of the faithfully recreated TV studio, a 1980s-style living room, dedicated art gallery, and painting workshop space and is filled with authentic objects, historic photos, original paintings, and interactive interpretive elements exploring the philosophy and art of Ross.

== Programs ==
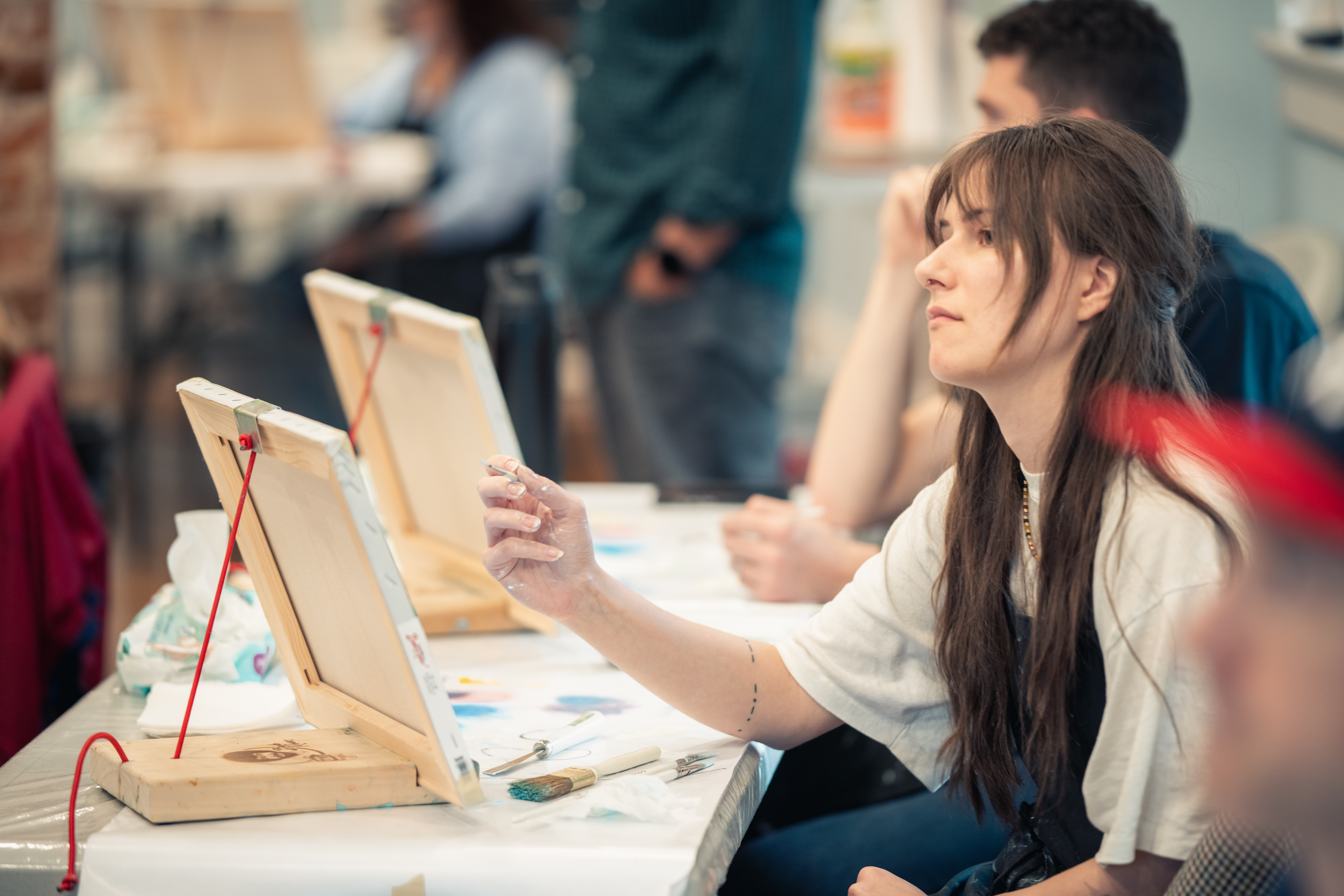
Bob Ross Painting Workshop

Minnetrista offers community centric and family oriented programming throughout the year, from school tours, to painting and glass-working workshops, to three large scale signature events throughout the year.

- Signature events: Faeries, Sprites & Lights, Enchanted Luminaria Walk, Garden Fair
- Farmers Market

== Gardens ==
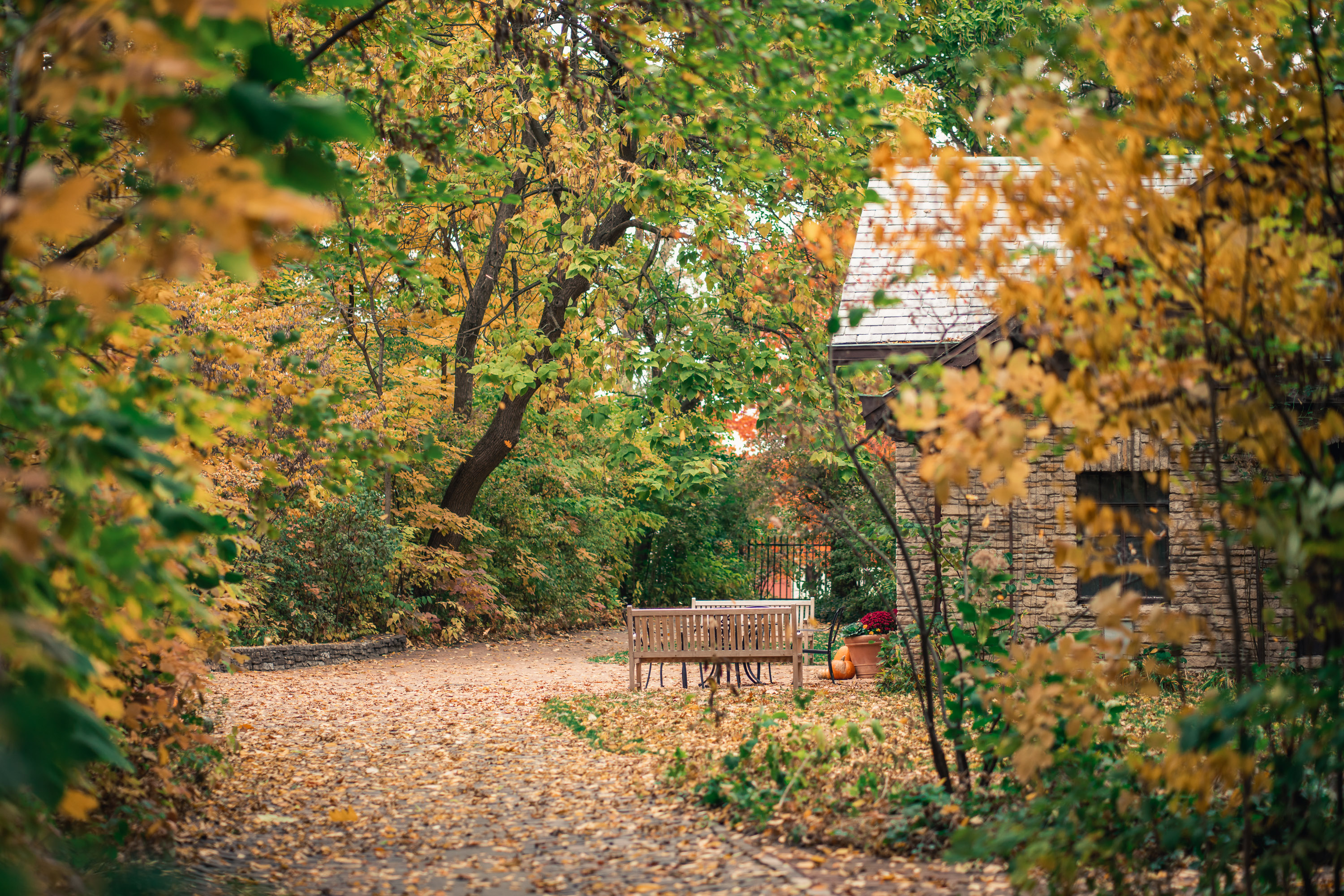
Oakhurst Gardens

When the Ball family moved to Muncie and began building their homes, they also transformed the landscape, developing beautiful lawns, award-winning rose gardens, fruit orchards, and ornamental gardens. Since the museum's opening in 1988, the historic greenspaces around Minnetrista's 40-acre campus have been revitalized and supplemented by new formal gardens inspired by the Ball family legacy and Minnetrista's history. These include:

- Oakhurst Gardens
- Orchard Garden
- Culinary Herb Garden
- Rose Garden
- Wishing Well Garden
- Backyard Garden
- The Nature Area

== See also ==
- List of botanical gardens and arboretums in Indiana
- List of museums in Indiana
