= Delaware County Regional Airport =

Airport in Indiana, United States of America

- IATA: MIE; ICAO: KMIE; FAA LID: MIE

Summary
- Airport type: Public
- Owner: Delaware County Airport Authority
- Serves: Muncie, Indiana
- Elevation AMSL: 937 ft (286 m)
- Coordinates: 40°14′33″N 085°23′45″W

Map
- Location of airport in Indiana/United States MIE (the United States)

Runways
Direction	Length		Surface
Direction	ft	m	Surface
14/32	6,500	1,981	Asphalt
3/21	5,198	1,584	Asphalt

Statistics (2010)
- Aircraft operations: 23,644
- Based aircraft: 22
- Source: Federal Aviation Administration

Delaware County Regional Airport (IATA: MIE, ICAO: KMIE, FAA LID: MIE) is in Hamilton Township, Delaware County, Indiana 3 miles (4.8 km) northwest of Muncie. Owned by the Delaware County Airport Authority, it was formerly Delaware County Airport and Johnson Field. The National Plan of Integrated Airport Systems for 2011–2015 categorized it as a general aviation facility.

== Facilities ==
The airport covers 963 acres (390 ha) at an elevation of 937 feet (286 m). It has two asphalt runways: 14/32 is 6,500 by 150 feet (1,981 x 46 m) and 3/21 is 5,198 by 100 feet (1,584 x 30 m).

In 2010 the airport had 23,644 aircraft operations, average 64 per day: 95% general aviation, 3% military, 2% air taxi, and 0% airline. It was home base to 22 aircraft: 86.5% single-engine, 4.5% multi-engine, 4.5% jet, and 4.5% helicopter.

=== Scheduled airlines ===
Airline flights started in 1958—Lake Central DC-3s. In 1981 Allegheny Commuter flew to Chicago-O'Hare and Indianapolis. By 1985 flights to Chicago were on Britt Airways and Indianapolis flights had ended. Great Lakes Airlines operated flights to and from Chicago's O'Hare International Airport in the 1990s.

== Businesses ==
- Muncie Aviation Company, the fixed-base operator (FBO).

== See also ==
- List of airports in Indiana
