= Ball Memorial Hospital =

Indiana University Health Ball Memorial Hospital
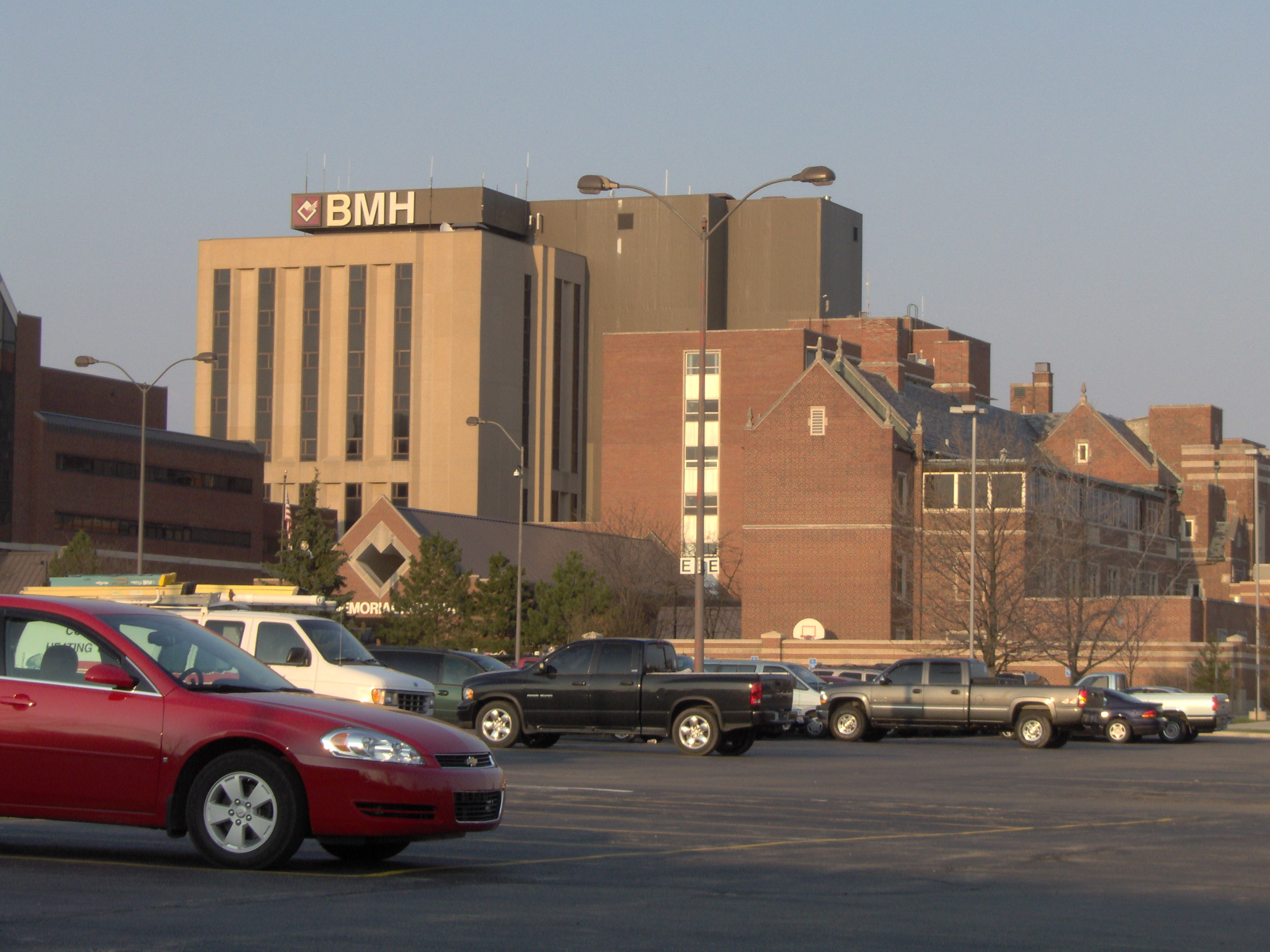
- Ball Memorial Hospital in 2007.

Geography
- Location: Muncie, Indiana, United States
- Coordinates: 40.1969°N 85.4154°W

Organization
- Affiliated university: Indiana University

Services
- Emergency department: Level III trauma center

History
- Founded: 1929

Links
- Website: Ball Memorial Hospital
- Lists: Hospitals in Indiana

Indiana University Health Ball Memorial Hospital is an academic teaching hospital in the city of Muncie, Indiana. It is the only hospital in Muncie. It was founded by the Ball brothers, hence the name, Ball Memorial Hospital. It is near the campus of Ball State University; however, it is affiliated with the Indiana University School of Medicine. The hospital was founded in 1929. It houses 3 residency programs/graduate medical education program including internal medicine, family medicine and a transitional year residency.
