= Muncie, Indiana =

Muncie
- City
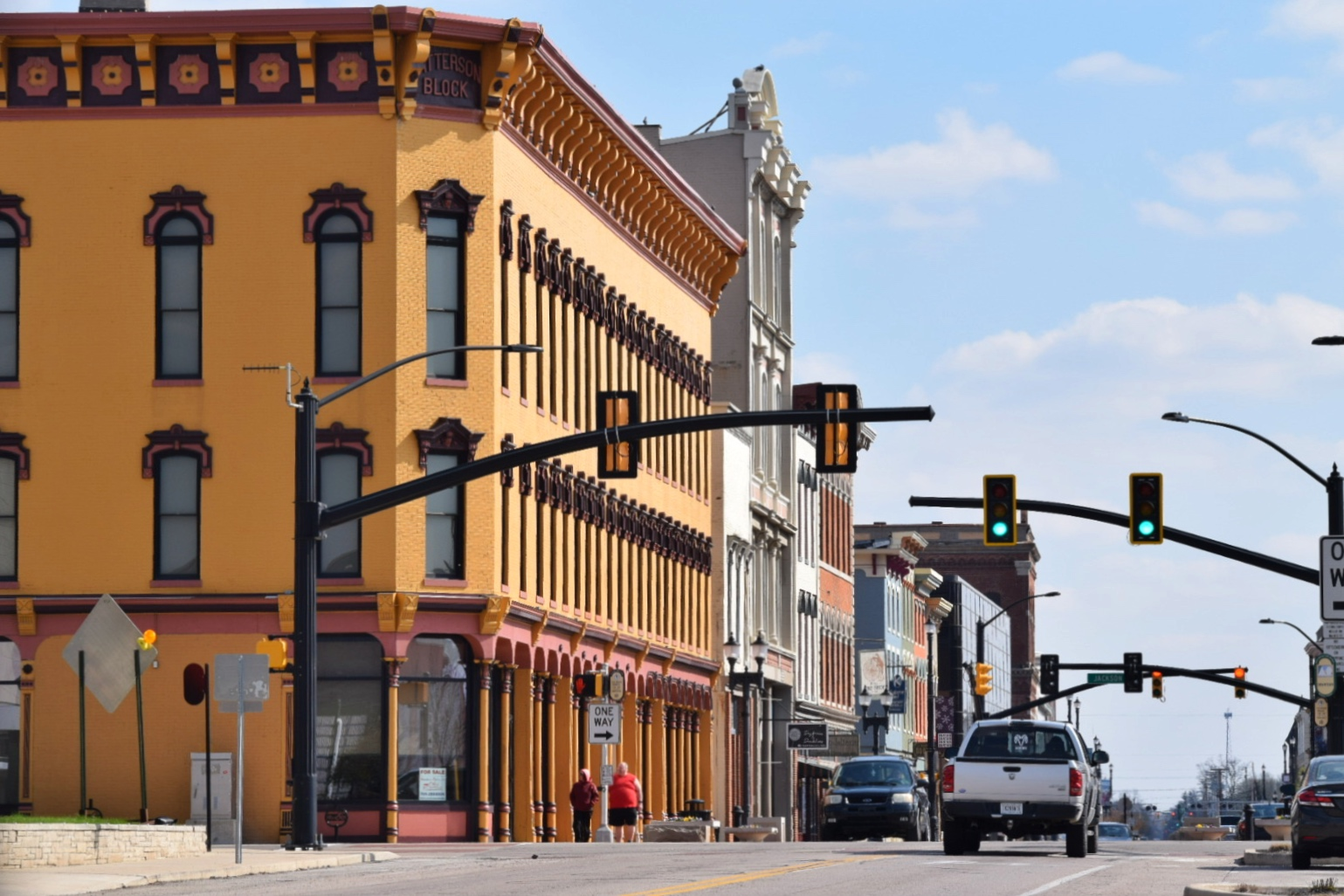
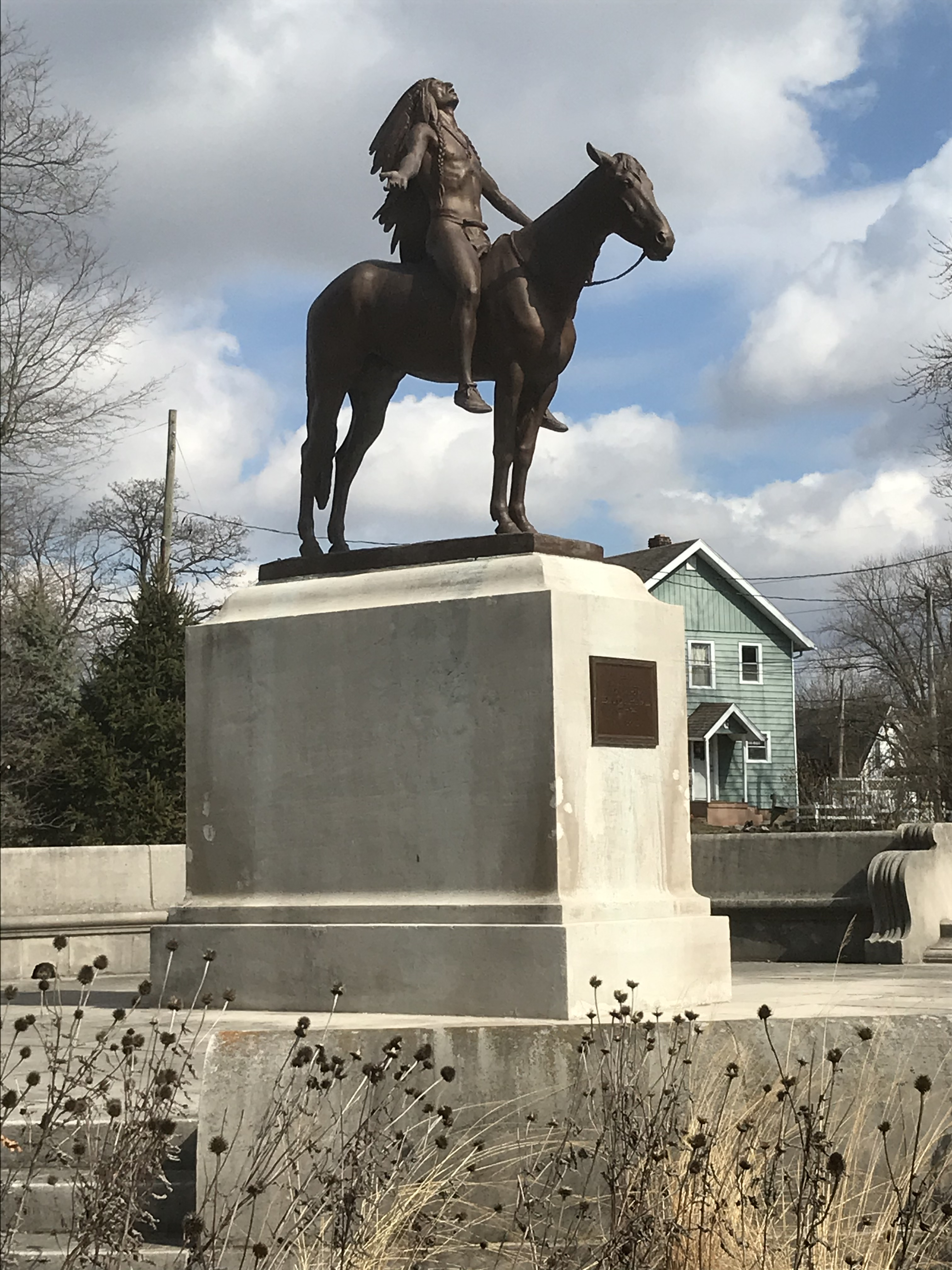
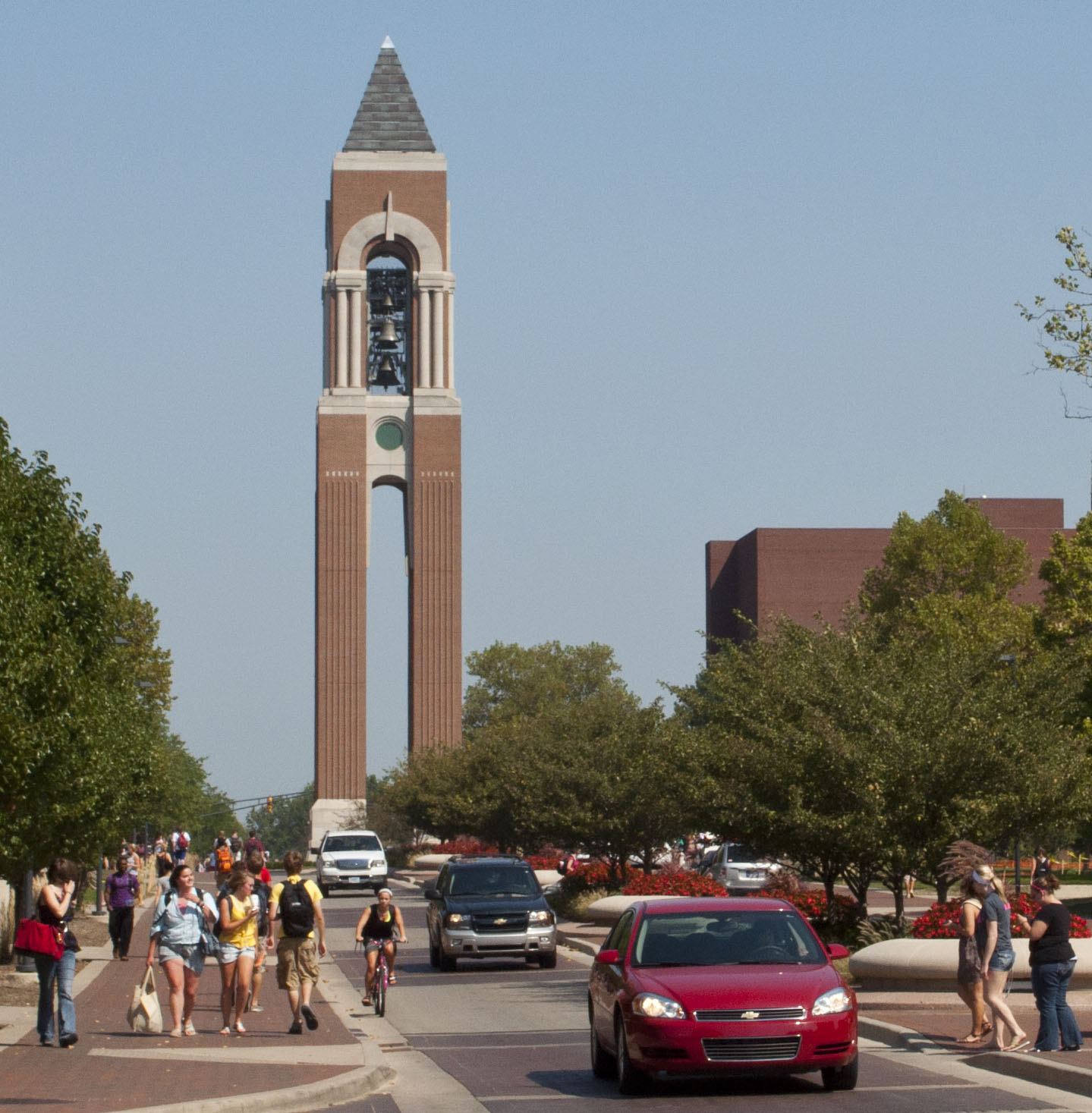
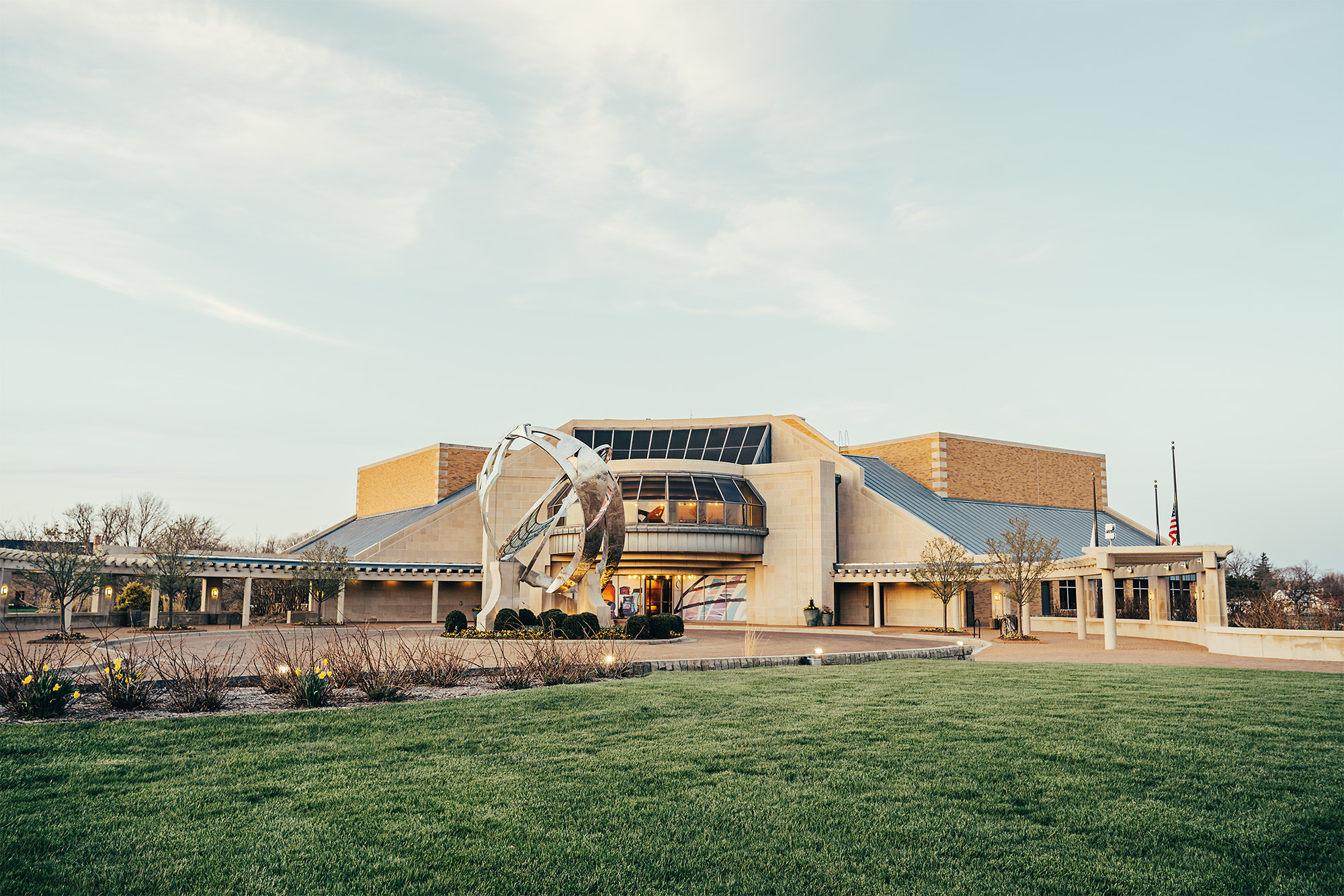
- Clockwise from top: Walnut Street Historic District, Appeal to the Great Spirit, Minnetrista Museum & Gardens, Ball State University

- Flag Seal Logo
- Nickname: Middletown
- Interactive map of Muncie
- Location within Indiana Location within the United States
- Coordinates: 40°11′48″N 85°22′30″W
- Country: United States
- State: Indiana
- County: Delaware
- Townships: Center, Hamilton, Harrison, Liberty, Mount Pleasant
- Founded: 1827
- Incorporated (town): December 6, 1854
- Incorporated (city): 1865

Government
  - Type: Mayor-Council
  - Mayor: Dan Ridenour (R)

Area
  - City: 27.60 sq mi (71.49 km^{2})
  - Land: 27.41 sq mi (70.98 km^{2})
  - Water: 0.20 sq mi (0.51 km^{2})
- Elevation: 935 ft (285 m)

Population (2020)
  - City: 65,194
  - Estimate (2022): 65,076
  - Density: 2,379.0/sq mi (918.54/km^{2})
  - Metro: 111,903
  - Demonym: Munsonian
- Time zone: UTC−5 (EST)
  - Summer (DST): UTC−4 (EDT)
- ZIP Codes: 47302–47308
- Area code: 765
- FIPS code: 18-51876
- GNIS feature ID: 2395138
- Interstate highways: I-69 (just west of town)
- U.S. Highways: US 35
- Major state roads: SR 3; SR 32; SR 67; SR 332
- Waterways: West Fork of White River
- Airports: Delaware County Regional Airport
- Public transit: MITS
- Website: www.muncie.in.gov

Muncie (/ˈmʌnsi/ MUN-see) is a city in Delaware County, Indiana, United States, and its county seat. It is located in East Central Indiana about 50 miles (80 km) northeast of Indianapolis. At the 2020 census, the city's population was 65,195, down from 70,085 in the 2010 census. It is the principal city of the Muncie metropolitan statistical area, which encompasses all of Delaware County. The city is also included in the Indianapolis–Carmel–Muncie combined statistical area.

The Lenape people, led by Buckongahelas, arrived in the area in the 1790s. They founded several villages, including one known as Munsee Town, along the White River. The trading post, renamed Muncietown, was selected as the Delaware County seat and platted in 1827. Its name was officially shortened to Muncie in 1845 and incorporated as a city in 1865. Muncie developed as a manufacturing and industrial center, especially after the Indiana gas boom of the 1880s. It is home to Ball State University. Muncie was also the subject of the Middletown studies, sociological research conducted in the 1920s and 1930s.

== History ==
=== Early settlement ===
The area was first settled in the 1790s by the Lenape (Delaware) people, who were forced west from their tribal lands in the Mid-Atlantic region (all of New Jersey, southeastern New York, eastern Pennsylvania, and northern Delaware) to new lands in present-day Ohio and eastern Indiana. The Lenape founded several towns along the White River, including Munsee Town, near the site of present-day Muncie. The term Munsee denotes a subgroup of the Lenape people.

In 1818, the area's native tribes ceded their lands to the federal government under the terms of the Treaty of St. Mary's and agreed to move farther west by 1821. New settlers began to arrive in what became Delaware County, Indiana, c. 1820, shortly before the area's public lands were formally opened for purchase. The small trading village of Munsee Town, renamed Muncietown, was selected as the Delaware County seat and platted in 1827. On January 13, 1845, Indiana's governor signed legislation passed by the Indiana General Assembly to shorten the town's name to Muncie. Soon, a network of roads connected Muncie to nearby towns, adjacent counties, and to other parts of Indiana. The Indianapolis and Bellefontaine Railroad, the first to arrive in Muncie in 1852, provided the town and the surrounding area with access to larger markets for its agricultural production, as well as a faster means of transporting people and goods into and out of the area.

Muncie incorporated as a town on December 6, 1854, and became an incorporated city in 1865. John Brady was elected as the city's first mayor. Muncie's early utility companies also date to the mid-1860s, including the city's waterworks, which was established in 1865.

After the American Civil War, two factors helped Muncie attract new commercial and industrial development: the arrival of additional railroads from the late 1890s to the early 1900s and the discovery of abundant supplies of natural gas in the area. Prior to the discovery of nearby natural-gas wells and the beginning of the gas boom in Muncie in 1886, the region was primarily an agricultural area, with Muncie serving as the commercial trading center for local farmers.

=== Industrial and civic development ===
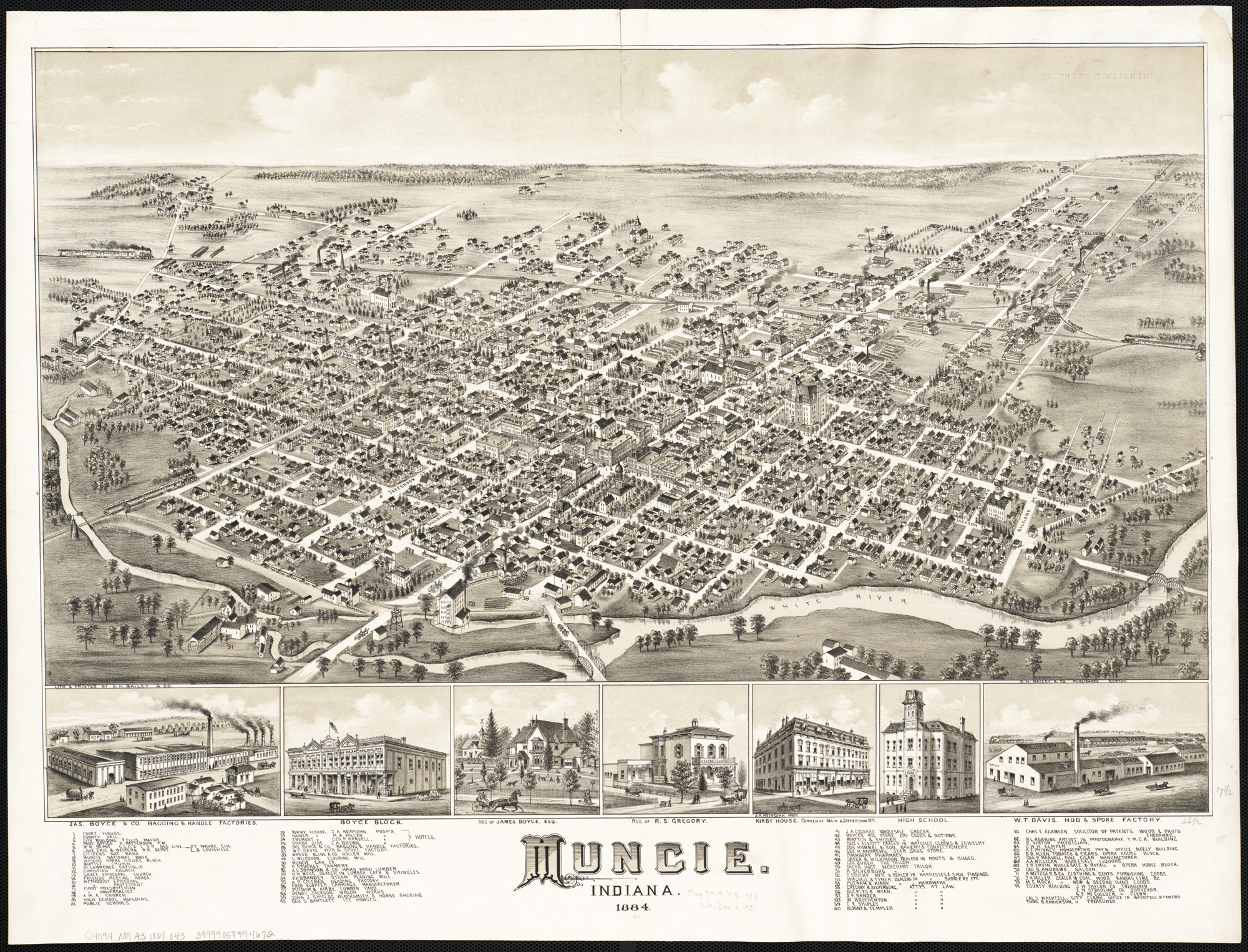
Illustration of Muncie, looking southeast in 1884

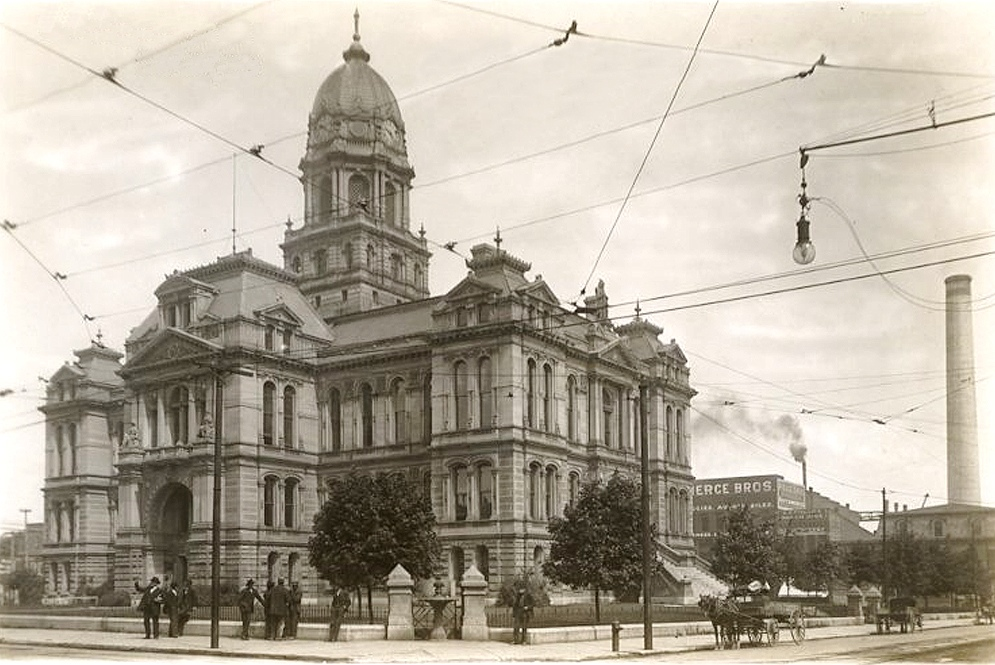
The Beaux-Arts Delaware County Courthouse was completed in 1887. It was razed in 1966.

The Indiana gas boom of the 1880s ushered in a new era of prosperity to Muncie. Abundant supplies of natural gas attracted new businesses, industries, and additional residents to the city. Although agriculture continued to be an economic factor in the region, industry dominated the city's development for the next 100 years. One of the major manufacturers that arrived early in the city's gas-boom period was the Ball Brothers Glass Manufacturing Company, which was renamed the Ball Corporation in 1969. The Ball brothers, who were searching for a new site for their glass manufacturing business that was closer to an abundant natural-gas supply, built a new glass-making foundry in Muncie, beginning its glass production on March 1, 1888. In 1889 the company relocated its metal manufacturing operations to Muncie.

In addition to several other glass factories, Muncie attracted iron and steel mills. Kitselman Steel & Wire Company was the largest employer in Indiana in 1900 with 11,000 employees; it later became Indiana Steel & Wire. Others included Republic Iron and Steel Company and the Midland Steel Company. (Midland became Inland Steel Company and later moved to Gary, Indiana.) Indiana Bridge Company was also a major employer. By the time the natural gas supply from the Trenton Gas Field had significantly declined and the gas boom ended in Indiana c. 1910, Muncie was well established as an industrial town and a commercial center for east-central Indiana, especially with several railroad lines connecting it to larger cities and the arrival of automobile industry manufacturing after 1900.

Numerous civic developments also occurred as a result of the city's growth during the 1870s, 1880s, and 1890s, when Muncie citizens built a new city hall, a new public library, and a new high school. The city's gasworks also began operations in the late 1870s. The Muncie Star was founded in 1899 and the Muncie Evening Press was founded in 1905. A new public library, which was a Carnegie library project, was dedicated on January 1, 1904, and served as the main branch of the city's public library system.

The forerunner to Ball State University also arrived at the turn of the twentieth century. Eastern Indiana Normal School opened in 1899, but it closed after two years. Several subsequent efforts to establish a private college in Muncie during the late nineteenth and early twentieth centuries also failed, but one proved to be very successful. After the Ball brothers bought the school property and its vacant buildings and donated them to the State of Indiana, the Indiana State Normal School, Eastern Division, the forerunner to Ball State University, opened in 1918. It was named Ball Teachers College in 1922, Ball State Teachers College in 1929, and Ball State University in 1965.

Beginning in the late nineteenth century, in tandem with the gas boom, Muncie developed an active cultural arts community, which included music and art clubs, women's clubs, self-improvements clubs, and other social clubs. Hoosier artist J. Ottis Adams, who came to Muncie in 1876, later formed an art school in the city with fellow artist William Forsyth. Although their school closed with a year or two, other art groups were established, most notably the Art Students' League (1892) and the Muncie Art Association (1905).

By the early twentieth century several railroads served Muncie, which helped to establish the city as a transportation hub. The Cincinnati, Richmond and Muncie Railroad (later known as the Chesapeake and Ohio Railway) reached Muncie in 1903. The Chicago, Indiana, and Eastern Railroad (acquired by a subsidiary of the Pennsylvania Railroad system) and the Chicago and Southeastern (sometimes called the Central Indiana Railroad) also served the city. In addition to the railroads, Muncie's roads connected to nearby towns and an electric interurban system, which arrived in the early 1900s, linked it to smaller towns and larger cities, including Indianapolis and Fort Wayne, Indiana, and Dayton, Ohio.

With the arrival of the auto manufacturing and the related auto parts industry after the turn of the twentieth century, Muncie's industrial and commercial development increased as the population grew. During World War I, local manufacturers joined others around the county in converting their factories to production of war materiel. In the 1920s Muncie continued its rise as an automobile-manufacturing center, primarily due to its heavy industry and skilled labor force. During this time, the community also became a center of Ku Klux Klan activity. Muncie's Klan membership was estimated at 3,500 in the early 1920s. Scandals within the Klan's leadership, divisions among its members, and some violent confrontations with their opponents damaged the organization's reputation. Increasing hostility toward the Klan's political activities, beliefs, and values also divided the Muncie community, before its popularity and membership significantly declined by the end of the decade.

Muncie residents also made it through the challenges of the Great Depression, with the Ball brothers continuing their role as major benefactors to the community by donating funds for construction of new facilities at Ball State and Ball Memorial Hospital. (The hospital, which opened in 1929, later affiliated with Indiana University Health.) The Works Progress Administration (WPA) also provided jobs such as road grading, city sewer improvements, and bridge construction.

=== Middletown studies ===
In the 1920s, Robert and Helen Lynd led a team of sociologists in a study of a typical middle-American community. The Lynds chose Muncie as the locale for their field research, although they never specifically identified it as "Middletown" the fictional name of the town in their study. Muncie received national attention after the publication of their book, Middletown: A Study in Contemporary American Culture (1929). The Lynds returned to Muncie to re-observe the community during the Depression, which resulted in a sequel, Middletown in Transition: A Study in Cultural Conflicts (1937). The Lynds' Middletown study, which was funded by the Rockefeller Institute of Social and Religious Research, was intended to study "the interwoven trends that are the life of a small American city."

The Lynds were only the first to conduct a series of studies in Muncie. The National Science Foundation funded a third major study that resulted in two books by Theodore Caplow, Middletown Families (1982) and All Faithful People (1983). Caplow returned to Muncie in 1998 to begin another study, Middletown IV, which became part of a Public Broadcasting Service documentary titled "The First Measured Century", released in December 2000. The Ball State Center for Middletown Studies continues to survey and analyze social change in Muncie. A database of Middletown surveys conducted between 1978 and 1997 is available online from the Association of Religion Data Archives (ARDA). Due to the extensive information collected from the Middletown studies during the twentieth century, Muncie is said to be one of the most studied cities of its size in the United States.

In addition to being called a "typical American city", as the result of the Middletown studies, Muncie is known as Magic City or Magic Muncie, as well as the Friendly City.

=== World War II to the present ===
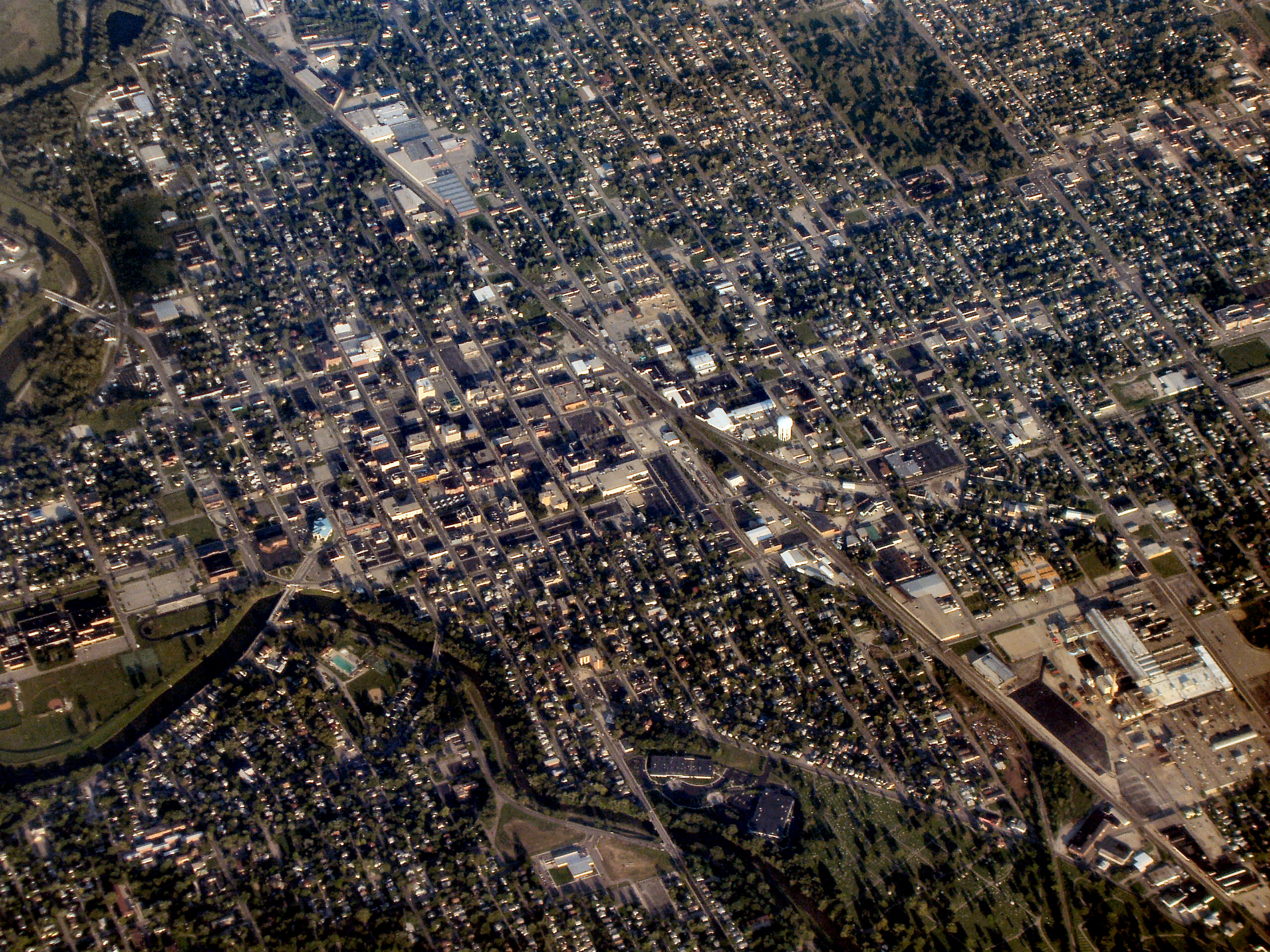
Aerial view of Muncie in 2005

During World War II, the city's manufacturers once again turned their efforts to wartime production. Ball State and Muncie's airport also trained pilots for the U.S. Navy. The postwar era was another period of expansion for Muncie, with continued growth and development of industries, construction of new homes, schools, and businesses. A population boom brought further development, especially from 1946 to 1965.

Since the 1950s and 1960s, Muncie has continued as an education center in the state and emerged as a regional health center. As enrollment at Ball State increased, new buildings were erected on the college's campus. Ball Memorial Hospital also expanded its facilities. However, by the 1960s, industrial trends had shifted. Beginning in the 1970s several manufacturing plants closed or moved elsewhere, while others adapted to industrial changes and remained in Muncie. Ball Corporation, for example, closed its Muncie glass manufacturing facilities in 1962 and its corporate headquarters relocated to Broomfield, Colorado in 1998. Muncie was also home to other manufacturing operations, including Warner Gear (a division of BorgWarner), Delco Remy, General Motors, Ontario Corporation, A. E. Boyce Company, and Westinghouse Electric, among others.

In 2017, the Muncie Community Schools system was declared a "distressed political subdivision", and put in direct control of the state government. In 2018, the school district was reformed and a new board was appointed by Ball State's Board of Trustees.

In 2021, following the Fall of Kabul and the U.S. withdrawal from the War in Afghanistan, several Afghan refugees arrived in Camp Atterbury, near Edinburgh, Indiana. Munsonian members of the nationwide organization, Afghan Women's and Kids' Education and Necessities (AWAKEN) formed the Muncie Afghan Refugee Resettlement Committee (MARRC) to help Afghan refugees resettle in Muncie. Afghan refugees began arriving in Muncie soon after. As the AWAKEN organization wanted to continue work directly in Afghanistan, the temporary MARRC organization was closed. However, the presence of 130 Afghan refugees in Muncie in late 2022 compelled continued work in medical advocacy, employment, legal aid, and financial and reading education. A new organization, Refugee Alliance of Delaware County (RADC), was formed to welcome any refugees in Muncie and help them in establishing and building a new life.

=== African-American history ===
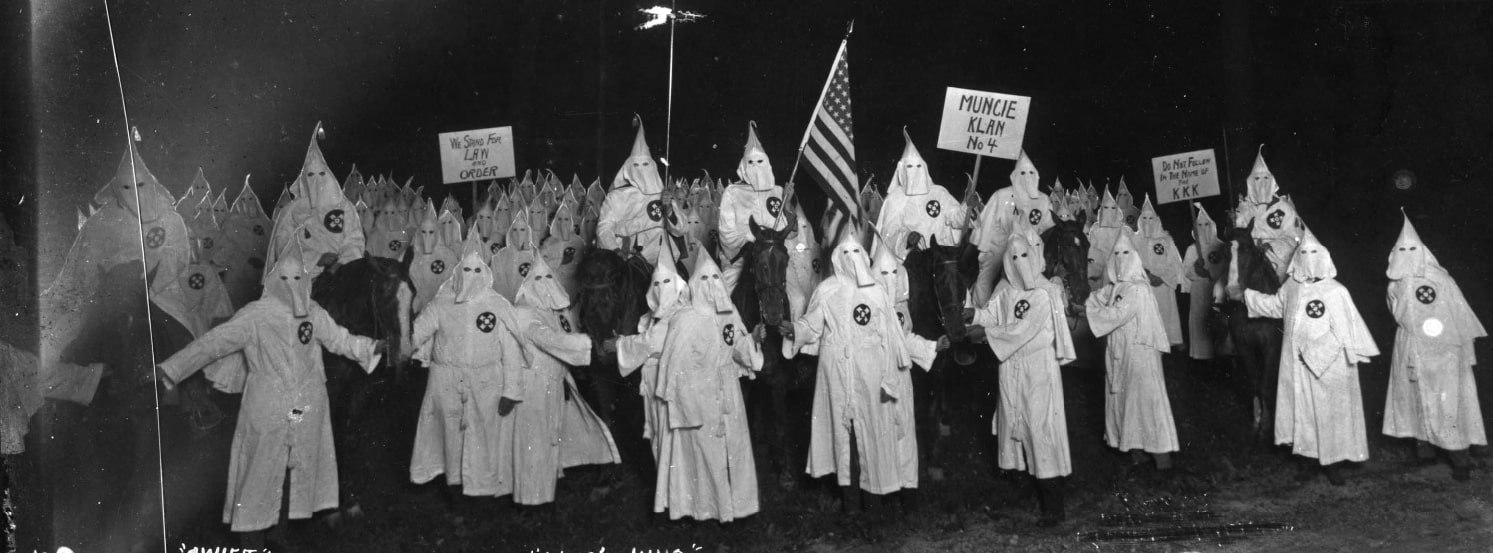
A Ku Klux Klan gathering in Muncie in 1922

The black population in Muncie grew from 3.7% in 1890 to 5.6% in 1920 to 13.2% in 2013. Muncie's Riverside and Normal City neighborhoods had imposed sundown town rules by 1904, meaning "that unknown negroes who are found on the streets after nightfall are liable to be severely dealt with." In 1920, the city had the fifth-largest black population in Indiana, with 2,054 black residents. Two major parades were held by the Ku Klux Klan in 1922 and 1924, with the mayor and police chief attending the 1924 parade.

The first black police officer in Muncie was hired in 1899, and the city's first black police chief took his position in 1995. The first black teacher in the city was hired in 1952, and the first black principal was appointed in 1956.

According to Hurley Goodall, the first serious black political candidate in Muncie was Wayne Brooks, who ran for the Republican nomination for mayor in 1934. Ray Armstrong was elected as the first black member of the city council in 1951, and Alice McIntosh was elected as the first black female member of the city council in 1983. Goodall was the first black person elected to the city's school board and later to represent the area in the state house. No other black person served on Muncie's school board after Goodall's election to the state house until Carl Kizer Jr.'s appointment to the board in 1993. The school board became majority black for the first time after the 2008 election.

== Geography ==
According to the 2010 census, Muncie has a total area of 27.392 square miles (70.94 km^{2}), of which 27.2 square miles (70.45 km^{2}),or 99.3%, is land and 0.192 square miles (0.50 km^{2}),or 0.7%, is water.

=== Climate ===
Muncie has a humid continental climate (Köppen climate classification: Dfa), experiencing four distinct seasons.

Climate data for Muncie, Indiana (Delaware County Airport), 1991–2020 normals, extremes 1962–present
Month	Jan	Feb	Mar	Apr	May	Jun	Jul	Aug	Sep	Oct	Nov	Dec	Year
Record high °F (°C)	67 (19)	77 (25)	84 (29)	88 (31)	98 (37)	106 (41)	101 (38)	99 (37)	96 (36)	93 (34)	81 (27)	71 (22)	106 (41)
Mean maximum °F (°C)	57.5 (14.2)	61.6 (16.4)	71.7 (22.1)	81.0 (27.2)	88.2 (31.2)	92.6 (33.7)	93.2 (34.0)	91.8 (33.2)	90.0 (32.2)	83.4 (28.6)	69.8 (21.0)	60.2 (15.7)	94.7 (34.8)
Mean daily maximum °F (°C)	36.0 (2.2)	39.9 (4.4)	50.9 (10.5)	64.1 (17.8)	74.6 (23.7)	83.0 (28.3)	85.8 (29.9)	84.1 (28.9)	78.8 (26.0)	66.3 (19.1)	52.3 (11.3)	40.7 (4.8)	63.0 (17.2)
Daily mean °F (°C)	28.6 (−1.9)	31.9 (−0.1)	41.7 (5.4)	53.5 (11.9)	64.4 (18.0)	73.3 (22.9)	76.0 (24.4)	73.7 (23.2)	67.2 (19.6)	55.8 (13.2)	43.9 (6.6)	33.8 (1.0)	53.6 (12.0)
Mean daily minimum °F (°C)	21.3 (−5.9)	23.9 (−4.5)	32.5 (0.3)	43.0 (6.1)	54.2 (12.3)	63.6 (17.6)	66.3 (19.1)	63.4 (17.4)	55.7 (13.2)	45.4 (7.4)	35.6 (2.0)	26.9 (−2.8)	44.3 (6.8)
Mean minimum °F (°C)	−2.7 (−19.3)	2.1 (−16.6)	12.5 (−10.8)	24.7 (−4.1)	36.3 (2.4)	47.2 (8.4)	51.9 (11.1)	49.5 (9.7)	39.6 (4.2)	28.2 (−2.1)	18.4 (−7.6)	6.2 (−14.3)	−5.9 (−21.1)
Record low °F (°C)	−29 (−34)	−13 (−25)	−7 (−22)	10 (−12)	25 (−4)	36 (2)	44 (7)	39 (4)	27 (−3)	18 (−8)	3 (−16)	−21 (−29)	−29 (−34)
Average precipitation inches (mm)	2.52 (64)	2.27 (58)	3.08 (78)	3.89 (99)	4.36 (111)	4.81 (122)	4.10 (104)	3.38 (86)	3.09 (78)	2.96 (75)	3.23 (82)	2.57 (65)	40.26 (1,023)
Average snowfall inches (cm)	8.0 (20)	6.4 (16)	3.2 (8.1)	0.4 (1.0)	0.0 (0.0)	0.0 (0.0)	0.0 (0.0)	0.0 (0.0)	0.0 (0.0)	0.3 (0.76)	0.7 (1.8)	6.4 (16)	25.4 (65)
Average precipitation days (≥ 0.01 in)	9.8	9.8	11.5	12.3	13.4	12.7	10.8	10.4	9.9	10.2	10.1	11.5	132.4
Average snowy days (≥ 0.1 in)	5.0	4.4	2.2	0.4	0.0	0.0	0.0	0.0	0.0	0.1	1.0	5.3	18.4
Source: NOAA (snow 1981–2010)

== Demographics ==
Historical population
Census	Pop.	Note	%±
1850	666		—
1860	1,782		167.6%
1870	2,992		67.9%
1880	5,219		74.4%
1890	11,345		117.4%
1900	20,942		84.6%
1910	24,005		14.6%
1920	36,524		52.2%
1930	46,548		27.4%
1940	49,720		6.8%
1950	58,479		17.6%
1960	68,603		17.3%
1970	69,082		0.7%
1980	76,460		10.7%
1990	71,035		−7.1%
2000	67,430		−5.1%
2010	70,085		3.9%
2020	65,194		−7.0%
2022 (est.)	65,076		−0.2%
U.S. Decennial Census

=== 2020 census ===
As of the 2020 census, Muncie had a population of 65,194. The median age was 30.7 years. 17.3% of residents were under the age of 18 and 15.8% of residents were 65 years of age or older. For every 100 females there were 87.8 males, and for every 100 females age 18 and over there were 84.6 males age 18 and over.

There were 26,692 households and 6,179 families in the city, of which 22.0% had children under the age of 18 living in them. Of all households, 28.1% were married-couple households, 25.4% were households with a male householder and no spouse or partner present, and 37.9% were households with a female householder and no spouse or partner present. About 38.6% of all households were made up of individuals and 13.4% had someone living alone who was 65 years of age or older. The average household size was 2.18 and the average family size was 3.09.

There were 31,183 housing units, of which 14.4% were vacant. The homeowner vacancy rate was 3.1% and the rental vacancy rate was 12.4%.

99.9% of residents lived in urban areas, while 0.1% lived in rural areas.

Racial composition as of the 2020 census
Race	Number	Percent
White	50,829	78.0%
Black or African American	7,594	11.6%
American Indian and Alaska Native	185	0.3%
Asian	957	1.5%
Native Hawaiian and Other Pacific Islander	42	0.1%
Some other race	1,376	2.1%
Two or more races	4,211	6.5%
Hispanic or Latino (of any race)	2,724	4.2%

=== 2010 census ===
As of the census of 2010, there were 70,085 people, 27,722 households, and 13,928 families residing in the city. The population density was 2,576.7 inhabitants per square mile (994.9/km^{2}). There were 31,958 housing units at an average density of 1,174.9 per square mile (453.6/km^{2}). The racial makeup of the city was 84.0% White, 10.9% Black, 0.3% Native American, 1.2% Asian, 0.1% Pacific Islander, 0.8% from other races, and 2.8% from two or more races. Hispanic or Latino residents of any race were 2.3% of the population.

There were 27,722 households, of which 23.9% had children under the age of 18 living with them, 31.5% were married couples living together, 14.1% had a female householder with no husband present, 4.6% had a male householder with no wife present, and 49.8% were non-families. 35.2% of all households were made up of individuals, and 10.9% had someone living alone who was 65 years of age or older. The average household size was 2.22 and the average family size was 2.85.

The median age in the city was 28.1 years. 17.8% of residents were under the age of 18; 27.5% were between the ages of 18 and 24; 21.4% were from 25 to 44; 20.2% were from 45 to 64; and 13% were 65 years of age or older. The gender makeup of the city was 47.5% male and 52.5% female.

=== 2000 census ===
As of the census of 2000, there were 67,430 people, 27,322 households, and 14,589 families residing in the city. The population density was 2,788.2 inhabitants per square mile (1,076.5/km^{2}). There were 30,205 housing units at an average density of 1,248.9 per square mile (482.2/km^{2}). The racial makeup of the city was 83.72% White, 12.97% Black, 0.27% Native American, 0.79% Asian, 0.09% Pacific Islander, 0.67% from other races, and 1.49% from two or more races. Hispanic or Latino residents of any race were 1.44% of the population.

There were 27,322 households, out of which 23.7% had children under the age of 18 living with them, 36.4% were married couples living together, 13.0% had a female householder with no husband present, and 46.6% were non-families. 34.1% of all households were made up of individuals, and 11.8% had someone living alone who was 65 years of age or older. The average household size was 2.24 and the average family size was 2.86.

In the city, the age distribution of the population included 19.8% under the age of 18, 24.6% from 18 to 24, 24.2% from 25 to 44, 18.3% from 45 to 64, and 13.2% who were 65 years of age or older. The median age was 29 years. For every 100 females, there were 89.9 males. For every 100 females age 18 and over, there were 86.5 males.

The median income for a household in the city was $26,613, and the median income for a family was $36,398. Males had a median income of $30,445 versus $21,872 for females. The per capita income for the city was $15,814. About 14.3% of families and 23.1% of the population were below the poverty line, including 24.2% of those under age 18 and 9.7% of those age 65 or over.

== Economy ==
The Ball brothers, industrialists and founders of Ball Corporation, were influential in the city's civic and economic development.

From its early days as a regional trading center for the surrounding agricultural community to its first wave of industrial development brought on by the Indiana gas boom in the mid-1880s, Muncie has retained its ties to an industrial economy, and to a lesser extent its agricultural roots. In addition, the arrival of the forerunner to Ball State in the early twentieth century contributed to Muncie's development as an educational center, while Ball Memorial Hospital, established in 1929, led to the city's reputation as a healthcare center for east-central Indiana.

Muncie's major industrial development included glass manufacturing, iron and steel mills, and automobile manufacturing and auto parts factories. Among its early major employers was the Ball Corporation, established by the Ball brothers of Buffalo, New York, who opened a glass factory in Muncie in 1888. Other notable manufacturers in addition to the Ball Corporation with operations in Muncie have included BorgWarner, The Broderick Company (a former division of Harsco), Dayton-Walther Corporation, Delco Remy, General Motors, New Venture Gear, Hemingray Glass Company, Ontario Corporation, A. E. Boyce Company, Indiana Steel and Wire, and Westinghouse Electric.

Changing industrial trends caused shifts in the city's economic development. As in many mid-sized cities in the Rust Belt, deindustrialization, which began in the 1960s, impacted Muncie's economy. Several manufacturing plants closed or moved elsewhere. From 2001 to 2011, Muncie lost thousands of jobs as the city continued transitioning from a blue-collar workforce to a white-collar service economy primarily based on health care, education, and retail.

Muncie has attracted some new manufacturers, while older factories have been converted to other industrial uses. In 2009, Muncie became the U.S. headquarters for Brevini Wind, an Italian-based company that manufactures gearboxes for wind turbines. In 2011, locomotive maker Progress Rail (a subsidiary of Caterpillar Inc) opened in a former Westinghouse facility that had been vacant since 1998.

The local economy is a controversial topic among Munsonians. While many older unemployed or underemployed residents strongly identify with the manufacturing identity of the city, newer residents identify with the city's shift towards educational and health services. Contention is greatest among residents living in the once-industrialized sections of the city's south side, as much of the economic growth over that last few decades has taken place on Muncie's north side. The city also struggles to retain college graduates. Despite Ball State's presence, only 32.2 percent of Delaware County's working-age adults (ages 25–64) hold a two-year or four-year college degree, which is below the national average.

The first decade of the 21st century saw a cultural shift toward local businesses and economic empowerment, boosted by the Muncie Downtown Development Partnership and the residents, patrons, and business owners of the downtown community. In 2007, Muncie was rated the most affordable college town in America by real estate company Coldwell Banker. In 2015, Forbes ranked Muncie 27th among small places for business and careers and 18th for cost of doing business. First Merchants Corporation is based in Muncie, and the first Scotty's Brewhouse location opened in the city in 1996.

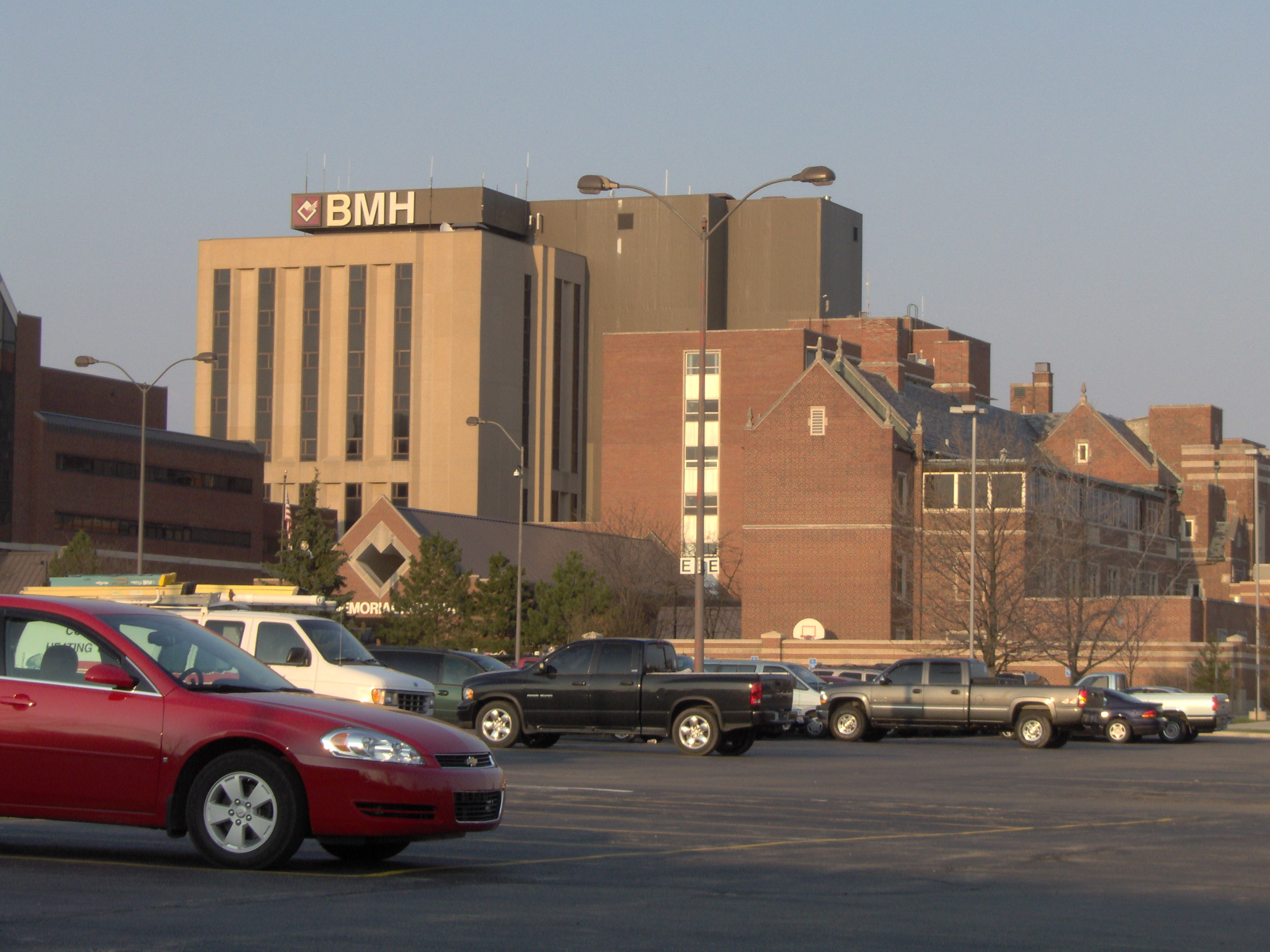
IU Health Ball Memorial Hospital, one of the city's largest employers

As of July 2022 (compare to October 2014), the largest employers in the city were:

Employer	2022 Employees	2014 Employees
Ball State University	3,379	3,741
IU Health Ball Memorial Hospital	2,613	3,000
Muncie Community Schools	650	926
Navient	633	650
Magna Powertrain	571	325
Concentrix	555	675
First Merchants Corporation	551	526
Meridian Health Services	550	610
Youth Opportunity Center	516	276
Progress Rail	500	281
City of Muncie	465	465
Delaware County Government Offices	452	522
Muncie Sanitary District	143	531

== Arts and culture ==
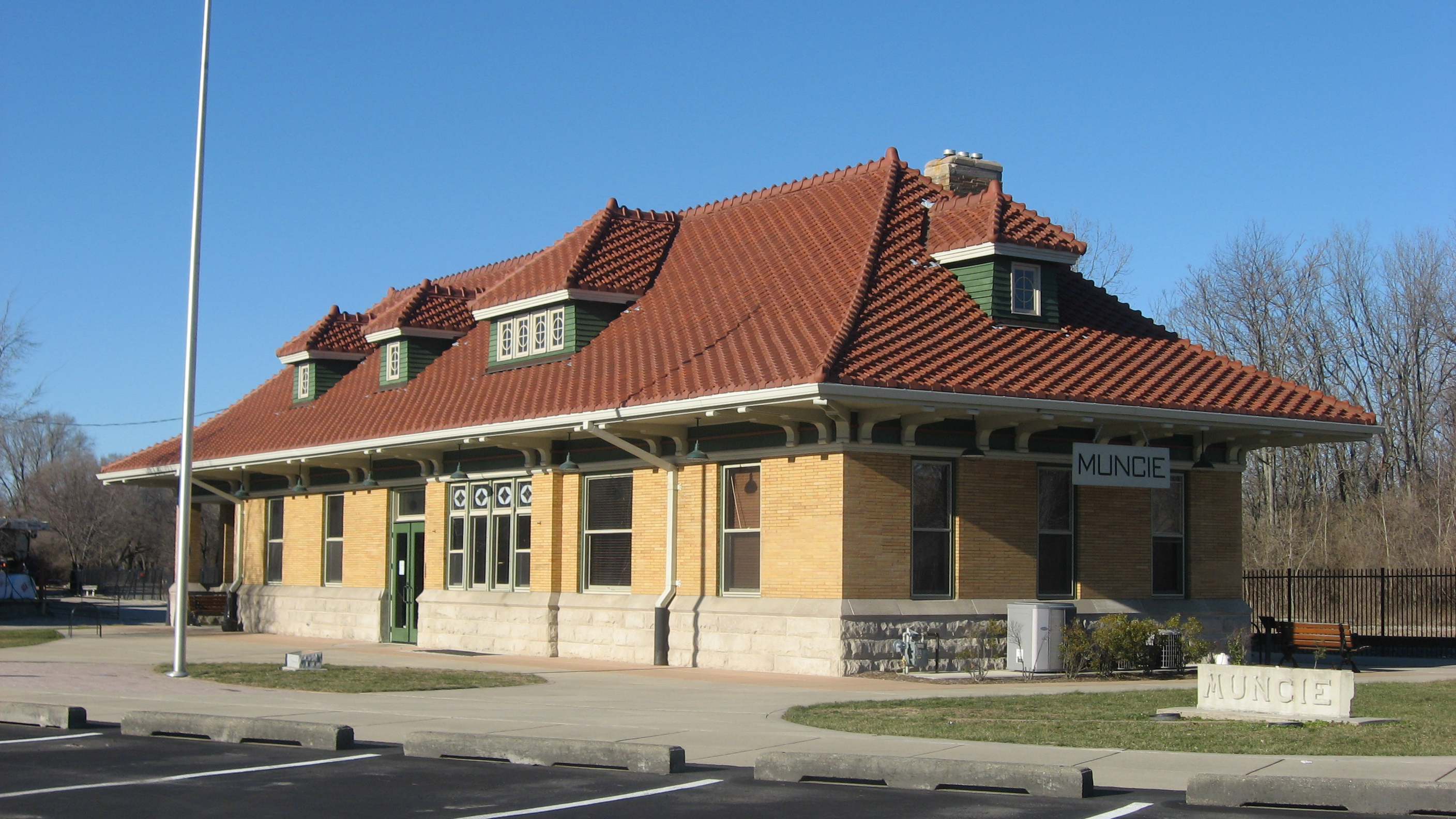
The visitor center for the Cardinal Greenway occupies the restored Cincinnati, Richmond, & Muncie Depot.

The David Owsley Museum of Art collection, which includes over 11,000 works, has been in the Fine Arts Building on the Ball State University campus since 1935. The Horizon Convention Center, located downtown, offers 47,000 square feet (4,400 m^{2}) of exhibition space and houses the Muncie Children's Museum. The city also has a large group of independent art galleries.

Three of the city's largest performing arts centers belong to Ball State University: the 3,581-seat Emens Auditorium, the 600-seat Sursa Performance Hall, and the 410-seat University Theatre. Downtown performing arts spaces include the Muncie Civic Theatre and Canan Commons, an outdoor amphitheater and greenspace that opened in 2011. In addition, the Muncie Ballet and the Muncie Symphony Orchestra are prominent in the city's arts community.

Minnetrista Museum & Gardens, just north of downtown along the White River, is a cultural heritage museum featuring exhibits and programs focusing on nature, local history, and art. The 40-acre (16-hectare) campus includes historic homes that were once owned by the Ball family, themed gardens, outdoor sculptures, and a portion of the White River Greenway. The Cardinal Greenway, Indiana's longest rail trail project, stretches 60 miles (97 km) from Richmond to Marion, Indiana. Designated a National Recreation Trail in 2003, it is part of the American Discovery Trail. The Ball State campus is home to Christy Woods, an 18-acre (7.3-hectare) arboretum, three greenhouses, and the Wheeler Orchid Collection and Species Bank.

Passing of the Buffalo and Appeal to the Great Spirit are public sculptures in Muncie by Cyrus Edwin Dallin.

Muncie's music scene has been home to such acts as Brazil, Everything, Now!, and Archer Avenue (ex-Margot & the Nuclear So and So's). Muncie MusicFest. Muncie also has a network of craft beer enthusiasts.

=== Libraries ===
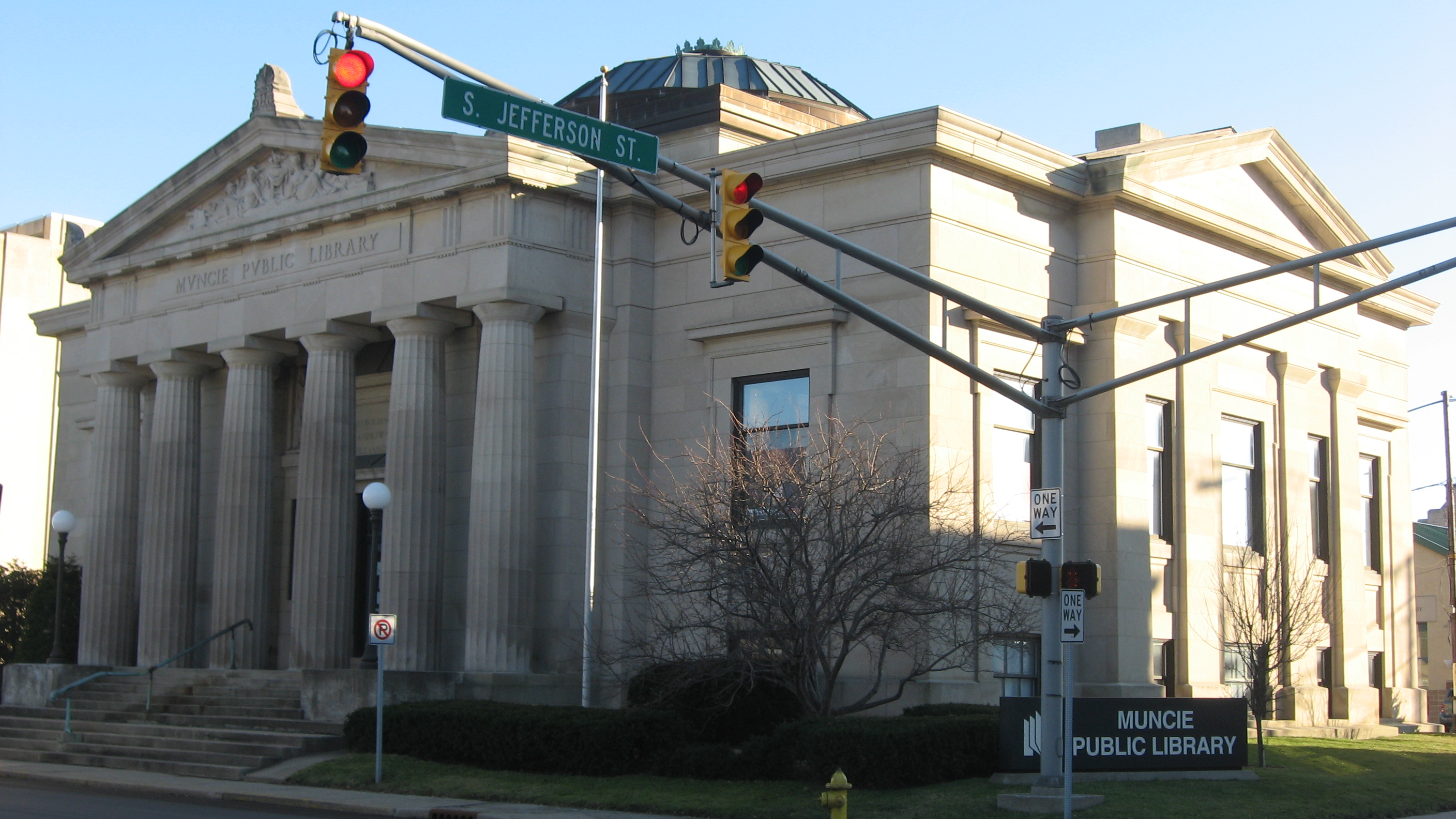
Muncie Public Library's Carnegie Library

- Carnegie Library
- Kennedy Library
- Maring–Hunt Library
- Connection Corner
- Shafer Library (Ivy Tech)
- Bracken Library (Ball State)

== Sports ==
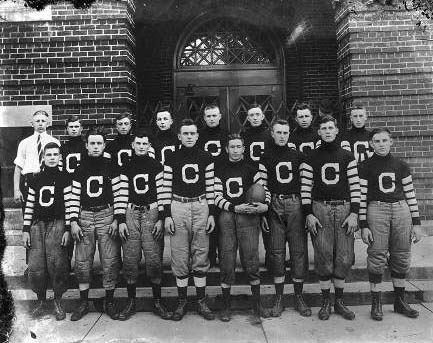
Congerville (Muncie) Flyers in 1915

Muncie is home to the NCAA Division I Ball State Cardinals which is a member of the Mid-American Conference. Notable sports include football (played at Scheumann Stadium), men's basketball (played at John E. Worthen Arena), and baseball (played at Ball Diamond).

Muncie was once home to the Muncie Flyers, also known as the Congerville Flyers, the city's professional football team from 1905 to 1925. The Muncie team was one of the eleven charter members of National Football League (NFL). It played in the league in 1920 and 1921.

Muncie was also home to the Muncie Flyers, a minor league hockey team. The team played in the International Hockey League for a single season in 1948–1949.

Muncie Central High School is home to the Muncie Fieldhouse, the fifth-largest high school gym in the United States.

== Government ==
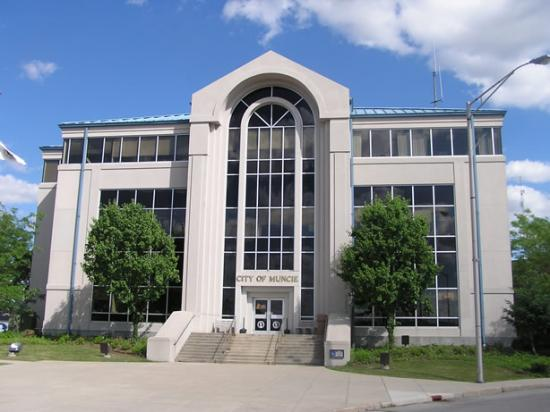
Muncie City Hall

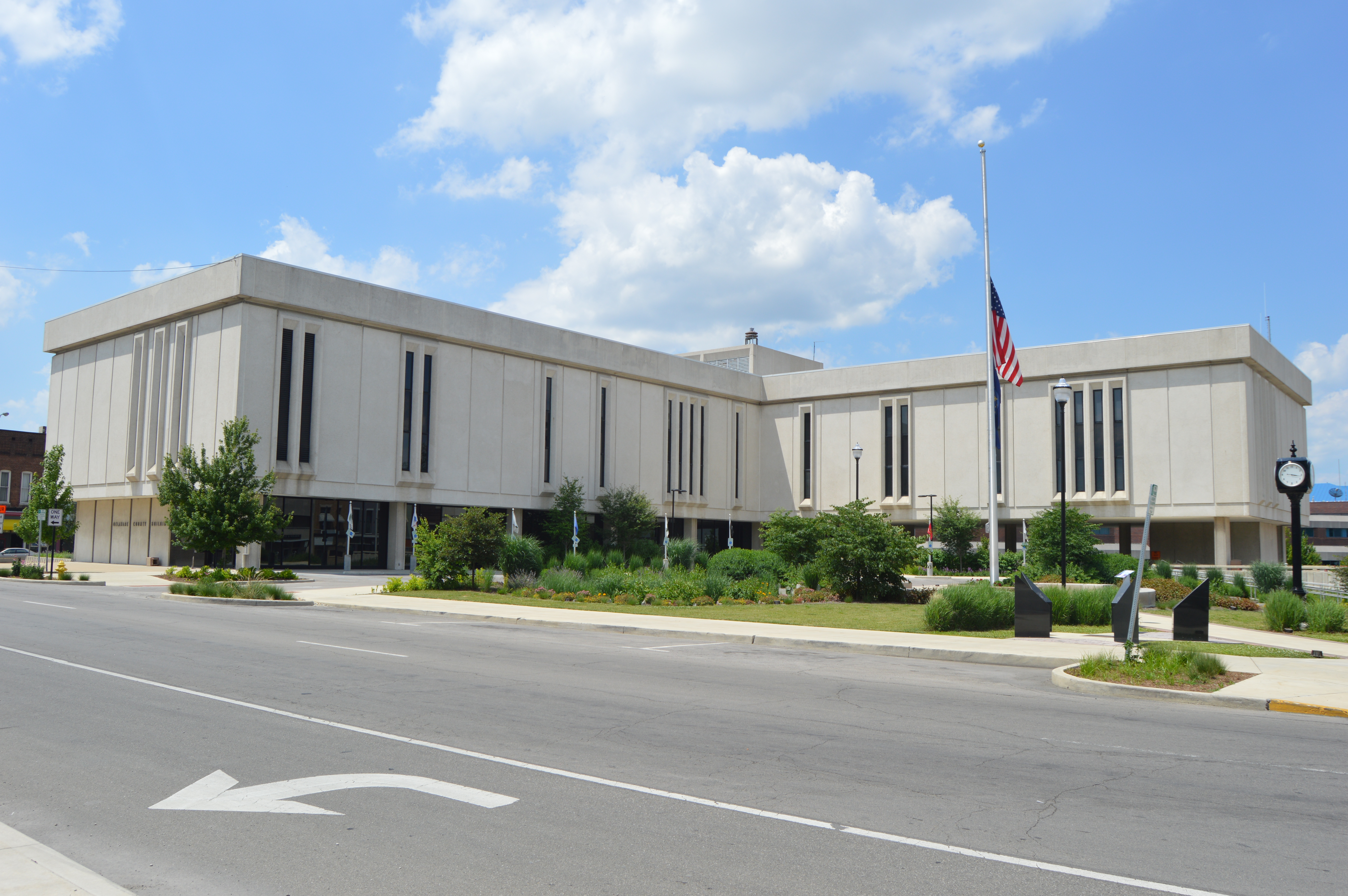
Delaware County Courthouse

The county government is a constitutional body and is granted specific powers by the Constitution of Indiana, and by the Indiana Code.

As a second class city in Indiana (pop. 35,000 to 599,999), Muncie is governed by a Mayor and a nine-member city council as well as a city clerk and city judge. City elections for Mayor, city council, city judge, and city clerk are held in odd years immediately preceding presidential elections (2015, 2019, etc.). The current mayor is Dan Ridenour, a Republican first elected in 2019. The current city clerk is Belinda Munson and the current city judge is Amanda Dunnuck. The nine-members of the city council are divided into six members elected from districts and three members elected at-large. The current members of the city council are:

- District 1: Jeff Green (R)
- District 2: Nora Evans Powell (D)
- District 3: Brandon Garrett (R)
- District 4: Sara Gullion (D)
- District 5: Jerry D. Dishman (R)
- District 6: Harold D. Mason Jr. (D)
- At-Large: Dale Basham (R)
- At-Large: Ro Selvey (R)
- At-Large: William (Billy Mac) McIntosh (D)

== Education ==
=== Higher education ===
- Ball State University - 24,441 students (2022)
- Ivy Tech Community College - 12,400 students (2021)
- Scuba Educators International

=== K-12 education ===
The majority of Muncie is in the Muncie Community Schools. Some pieces extend into other school districts, with western parts in the Mount Pleasant Township Community School Corporation, a few northwestern parts in the Wes-Del Community Schools Corporation school district, a small northern part in the Delaware Community School Corporation, and a small eastern part in the Liberty-Perry Community School Corporation. In 2022, Muncie Community Schools had 5,141 students.

Muncie School Corporation-operated elementary schools:

- East Washington Academy - 469 elementary students (2022)
- Grissom Memorial Elementary School - 469 elementary students (2022)
- Longfellow Elementary School - 328 elementary students (2022)
- North View Elementary School - 315 elementary students (2022)
- South View Elementary School - 448 elementary students (2022)
- West View Elementary School - 422 elementary students (2022)

Muncie School Corporation-operated middle schools:

- Northside Middle School - 577 middle school students (2022)
- Southside Middle School - 498 middle school students (2022)

Muncie School Corporation-operated high schools:

- Muncie Area Career Center
- Muncie Central High School - 1,437 high school students (2022)

Delaware County School Corporation-operated schools (all have postal addresses saying Muncie, Indiana, but all are outside of the city limits):

- Royerton Elementary School - 575 elementary students (2022)
- Delta Middle School - 656 middle school students (2022)
- Delta High School - 783 high school students (2022)

Charter schools:

- Inspire Academy - 113 elementary students (2022)

Other public schools:

- Burris Laboratory School - 228 elementary students, 187 middle school students, and 217 high school students (2022)
- Indiana Academy for Science, Mathematics, and Humanities - 206 high school students (2022)

Private schools:

- Heritage Hall Christian School - 112 elementary students, 41 middle school students, and 30 high school students (2022)
- St. Michael Catholic School - PreK-8 school, 48 elementary students (2022) - It was formed by a merger of St. Mary Catholic School, St. Lawrence Catholic School, and Pope John Paul II Middle School in 2021. St. Lawrence was established in 1881. St. Mary School was established in 1949. Pope John Paul II Middle School was formed in 2008 by the merger of the middle school divisions of St. Mary and St. Lawrence.

The Cowan Community School Corporation operates Cowan Elementary School and Cowan High School, which have Muncie postal addresses but are not in the city limits. No part of the Muncie city limits is in the Cowan district.

== Media ==
=== Newspapers ===
- The Star Press

=== Television ===
As part of the Indianapolis market, Muncie receives Indianapolis' network affiliates. East Central Indiana's PBS member station, WIPB, is located in Muncie. The Joy of Painting was filmed at WIPB.

=== Radio stations ===
- WCRD
- WERK
- WMXQ
- WLBC-FM
- WMUN
- WNAP-FM
- WBST
- WXXC

== Infrastructure ==
=== Transportation ===
==== Air ====
- Delaware County Regional Airport (not a commercial airport)
- Fort Wayne International Airport at 74.4 miles (119.7 km) and Indianapolis International Airport at 75.4 miles (121.3 km) are the nearest commercial airports.

==== Highways ====
- Interstate 69
- U.S. Route 35
- State Road 3
- State Road 32
- State Road 67
- State Road 332

==== Rail ====
Until 1986, Muncie's Wysor Street Depot at 700 East Wysor Street was a passenger train stop on the Chicago-Cincinnati service of Amtrak's Cardinal. Until 1971, Muncie Union Station was a stop on the Penn Central's Indianapolis-Cleveland on the route of the New York Central's former Southwestern Limited (St. Louis-New York City) and Cleveland Special (Indianapolis-Cleveland).

Freight service is provided by CSX and Norfolk Southern. Railroad equipment supplier Progress Rail opened a manufacturing facility in 2011.

==== Mass transit ====
Muncie Indiana Transit System (MITS) provides 14 fixed bus routes daily, except Sundays.

== Notable people ==
Note: This list does not include Ball State University graduates. Please see List of Ball State University alumni for notable alumni.

- Ray Boltz – American singer-songwriter
- Thomas Wayne Crump – American serial killer
- George R. Dale – American mayor and newspaper editor (1867–1936)
- Jim Davis – American cartoonist (born 1945)
- Dave Duerson – American football player (1960–2011)
- Bertha Fry – American supercentarian
- Brandon Gorin – American football player (born 1978)
- Ryan Kerrigan – American football player and coach (born 1988)
- Emily Kimbrough – American novelist
- Jules LaDuron – American physician and football player
- F. William Lawvere – American mathematician and philosopher (1937–2023)
- Cheryl Anne Lorance – American sculptor, painter, goldsmith, and printmaker
- Matt Painter – American basketball coach (born 1970)
- Bonzi Wells – American basketball player (born 1976)

== Sister cities ==
Muncie has five sister cities, as designated by Sister Cities International:

- Changhua, Taiwan
- Deyang, China
- Isparta, Turkey
- Taraz, Kazakhstan
- Zhuji, China

== See also ==
- Academy of Model Aeronautics
- Armed & Famous
- List of sundown towns in the United States
- Muncie Mall – Shopping mall in Muncie, Indiana
- Muncie SM465 transmission – Truck transmission built by GM
