= Greensburg, Ohio =

Unincorporated community in Ohio, U.S.

Coordinates: 40°55′54″N 81°27′53″W

Greensburg is an unincorporated community in Summit County, in the U.S. state of Ohio.

== History ==
Greensburg was laid out in 1828. The community was named after Gardner Green, a Connecticut Land Company agent. A variant name was Inland. A post office called Inland was established in 1838, and the name was changed to Greensburg in 1922.
