= Cowan Community School Corporation =

School district in Indiana, United States

Cowan Community School Corporation is a school district headquartered in Cowan, Indiana, with a Muncie post office address.

Its boundaries are those of Monroe Township, Delaware County. As of 2020 no part of the Muncie city limits extends into this school district. It operates Cowan Elementary School and Cowan Junior-Senior High School.

== History ==
The Monroe Community School Corporation was established in July 1969. This occurred after a State of Indiana commission allowed for the district to form.

In 1980, there was a proposal for this district to consolidate with the Salem Community School Corporation (now the Daleville Community School Corporation) that was promoted by some area residents. Luann W. Mason stated that emotional tensions resulted from the controversy about the proposed merger. The matter was put up for a referendum. Voters rejected the proposal.

On July 1, 1992, the Monroe district changed its name to its current name. The name change was done to prevent confusion with other school districts with the name "Monroe" in the state.

Larry John was superintendent from 1990 to 1999, and began another term as superintendent in 2003.
