= Bethel, Indiana =

Bethel may refer to the following places in the U.S. state of Indiana:

- Bethel, Delaware County, Indiana
- Bethel, Wayne County, Indiana
