= Mount Pleasant Township, Delaware County, Indiana =

Mount Pleasant Township
- Township
- Location of Mount Pleasant Township in Delaware County
- Coordinates: 40°11′12″N 85°30′20″W
- Country: United States
- State: Indiana
- County: Delaware
- Consolidation: January 1, 2013

Government
  - Type: Indiana township

Area
  - Total: 33.94 sq mi (87.9 km^{2})
  - Land: 33.7 sq mi (87 km^{2})
  - Water: 0.24 sq mi (0.62 km^{2})
- Elevation: 912 ft (278 m)

Population (2010)
  - Total: 14,102
  - Density: 418.5/sq mi (161.6/km^{2})
- Area code: 765
- FIPS code: 18-51552
- GNIS feature ID: 453657

Mount Pleasant Township is one of twelve townships in Delaware County, Indiana. According to the 2010 census, its population was 14,102 and it contained 6,157 housing units. The school system is Yorktown Community Schools in Yorktown.

== History ==
The Martin Hofherr Farm was listed on the National Register of Historic Places in 1992.

On January 1, 2013, Mount Pleasant was consolidated with the town of Yorktown so that local taxes will only have to be paid to a single governmental polity.

== Geography ==
According to the 2010 census, the township has a total area of 33.94 square miles (87.9 km^{2}), of which 33.7 square miles (87 km^{2}) (or 99.29%) is land and 0.24 square miles (0.62 km^{2}) (or 0.71%) is water.

=== Towns ===
- Yorktown (coextensive)

=== Unincorporated towns ===
- Cammack
- Reed Station
- West Muncie (Historical)

=== Adjacent townships ===
- Harrison Township (north)
- Center Township (east)
- Monroe Township (southeast)
- Salem Township (south)
- Richland Township, Madison County (west)
- Monroe Township, Madison County (northwest)

=== Major highways ===
- Interstate 69
- State Road 32
- State Road 332

=== Cemeteries ===
- * Yorktown Cemetery, 2367-2399 S Elm St, Yorktown, IN 47396; Downtown Yorktown. Oldest stone 1830. Oldest portion about 1 1/2 acres. Latitude: 40.1725 Longitude: 85.4914
- * Hawk Cemetery, 10501 W Division Rd, Yorktown, IN 47396; Large cemetery. Founded circa 1835. Oldest part over 2 acres. Latitude: 40.1936, Longitude: 85.5108
- Jones/Pleasant Run Cemetery 820 W, Reed Station, IN; Take 332 to 820 W. Go north. Cemetery is on the south side of the curve. 10 acres, older section less than an acre. Large cemetery. Oldest marker 1831. Latitude: 40.2178, Longitude: 85.5461
- * McKinley Cemetery, Cheyenne Cul-De-Sac, Yorktown, IN 47396; More than 30 stones. Founded circa 1832. Relatives of President William McKinley and Benjamin Harrison buried here. Latitude: 40.1989, Longitude: 85.4706
- * Mt. Pleasant Cemetery, 2900-4198 S Highbanks Rd, Daleville, IN 47334; Large cemetery in Mt. Pleasant Township. Earliest monument 1840. Oldest section under one acre. Latitude: 40.1567, Longitude: 85.5508 PDF with more information
- * Stewart Cemetery, west edge of Yorktown; south bank of the White River; exact location unknown within Sections 21 and 22; no roads to cemetery.
- * Van Matre Cemetery, 700 W just north of the White River, Yorktown, IN, Section 20. Two markers 1880. Latitude: 40.1696, Longitude: 85.5191
