= Cammack =

Cammack is a surname. Notable people with the surname include:

- E. E. Cammack (1881–1958), English actuary
- Eric Cammack (born 1975), American baseball player
- Gary Cammack (born 1953), American politician
- James Cammack (born 1956), African American bassist from New York
- Kat Cammack (born 1988), American politician
- Steve Cammack (born 1954), English footballer

== See also ==
- Cammack, Indiana, unincorporated town in Mount Pleasant Township, Delaware County, Indiana, US
- Cammack Village, Arkansas, city in Pulaski County, Arkansas, US
