= Progress, Indiana =

Progress
- Unincorporated community
- Location within Indiana Location within the United States
- Coordinates: 40°07′13″N 85°26′33″W
- Country: United States
- State: Indiana
- County: Delaware
- Township: Monroe
- Founded by: Samford Sharp
- Elevation: 971 ft (296 m)
- ZIP code: 47302
- FIPS code: 18-62118
- GNIS feature ID: 441606

Progress is an unincorporated community in Monroe Township, Delaware County, Indiana.

== History ==
Progress was platted in 1903 by Samford Sharp along the route of the former Central Indiana Railway. The land was previously owned by William Sharp as early as 1887. The town was envisioned as a small settlement consisting of six blocks with ten lots each. It was named "Progress" in order to attract individuals to move there.

A post office was established in Progress in 1900 but remained operational for only nine months, closing in early 1901. Despite its small size, Progress briefly flourished in the early 20th century, featuring a train depot, telegraph station, stockrooms, and a grain elevator. The Improved Order of Red Men established a lodge in Progress in 1900, drawing 400 visitors from Muncie for its christening. The lodge remained active into the 1930s, with anniversary celebrations attended by members and their families.

By 1920, the community had a service station, blacksmith shop, and general store. The Progress General Store stocked goods sourced from Muncie's Goddard Warehouse. However, Progress began to decline following the dismantling of the railroad in 1928. The general store eventually closed, and the lodge merged with a Muncie chapter.

Today, Progress is largely a forgotten community, with its most prominent remaining structure being the former lodge and general store building, now converted into a residence.
