= Cowan Junior-Senior High School =

Cowan High School

Location
- 9401 South Nottingham; Muncie, Indiana 47302; United States; 40.107171°N 85.392453°W

Information
- Type: Public high school
- School district: Cowan Community School Corporation
- Teaching staff: 24.50 (on an FTE basis)
- Grades: 7-12
- Enrollment: 318 (2024–2025)
- Student to teacher ratio: 12.98
- Color
- Team name: Blackhawks
- Website: Official Website

Cowan High School, also known as Cowan Junior/Senior High School, is located in Cowan, Indiana in Southern Delaware County in east central Indiana. It is in the Cowan Community School Corporation.

== Notable alumni ==
- Justin O'Conner - A 2010 graduate, finished his high school baseball career with a state record-tying 51 career home runs and a state record 198 RBIs. O'Conner also was drafted in the first round of the Major League Baseball Draft by the Tampa Bay Rays.

== See also ==
- List of high schools in Indiana
- Mid-Eastern Conference
- Muncie, Indiana
