= Prosperity, Indiana =

- Unincorporated community
- Location within Indiana Location within the United States
- Coordinates: 40°10′45″N 85°40′19″W
- Country: United States
- State: Indiana
- County: Madison
- Township: Lafayette
- Elevation: 886 ft (270 m)
- ZIP code: 46012
- FIPS code: 18-62163
- GNIS feature ID: 441612

Prosperity is an unincorporated community in Lafayette Township, Madison County, Indiana.

== History ==
Prosperity was founded around the time the canal was extended to that point. A post office was established at Prosperity in 1853, and remained in operation until it was discontinued in 1875.

The town of Prosperity appeared on the hit TV show 'Supernatural' season 7, episode 5.
