= Oakville =

Oakville may refer to:

== Australia ==
- Oakville, New South Wales, a suburb of Sydney, Australia

== Canada ==
- Oakville, Manitoba, an unincorporated community
- Oakville, Ontario, a town in Ontario
  - Oakville GO Station, a station in the GO Transit network located in the community
  - Oakville (federal electoral district), a provincial and federal electoral district which includes this town
  - Oakville (provincial electoral district), Ontario, Canada
  - Oakville—Milton, a defunct federal electoral district which included this town

== United States ==
- Oakville, Alabama, an unincorporated community
- Oakville, California, a census-designated place
  - Oakville AVA, an American Viticultural Area centered on the CDP
- Oakville, Connecticut, a census-designated place
- Oakville, Indiana, a census-designated place
- Oakville, Iowa, a city
- Oakville, St. Mary's County, Maryland, an unincorporated community
- Oakville, Michigan, an unincorporated community
- Oakville, Missouri, an unincorporated community
- Oakville, Tennessee, a former unincorporated community, now annexed by Memphis
- Oakville, Texas, an unincorporated community in northeastern Live Oak County
- Oakville, Washington, a city
