= Richwood Evangelical Lutheran Church =

Historic church in Indiana, United States

- U.S. National Register of Historic Places
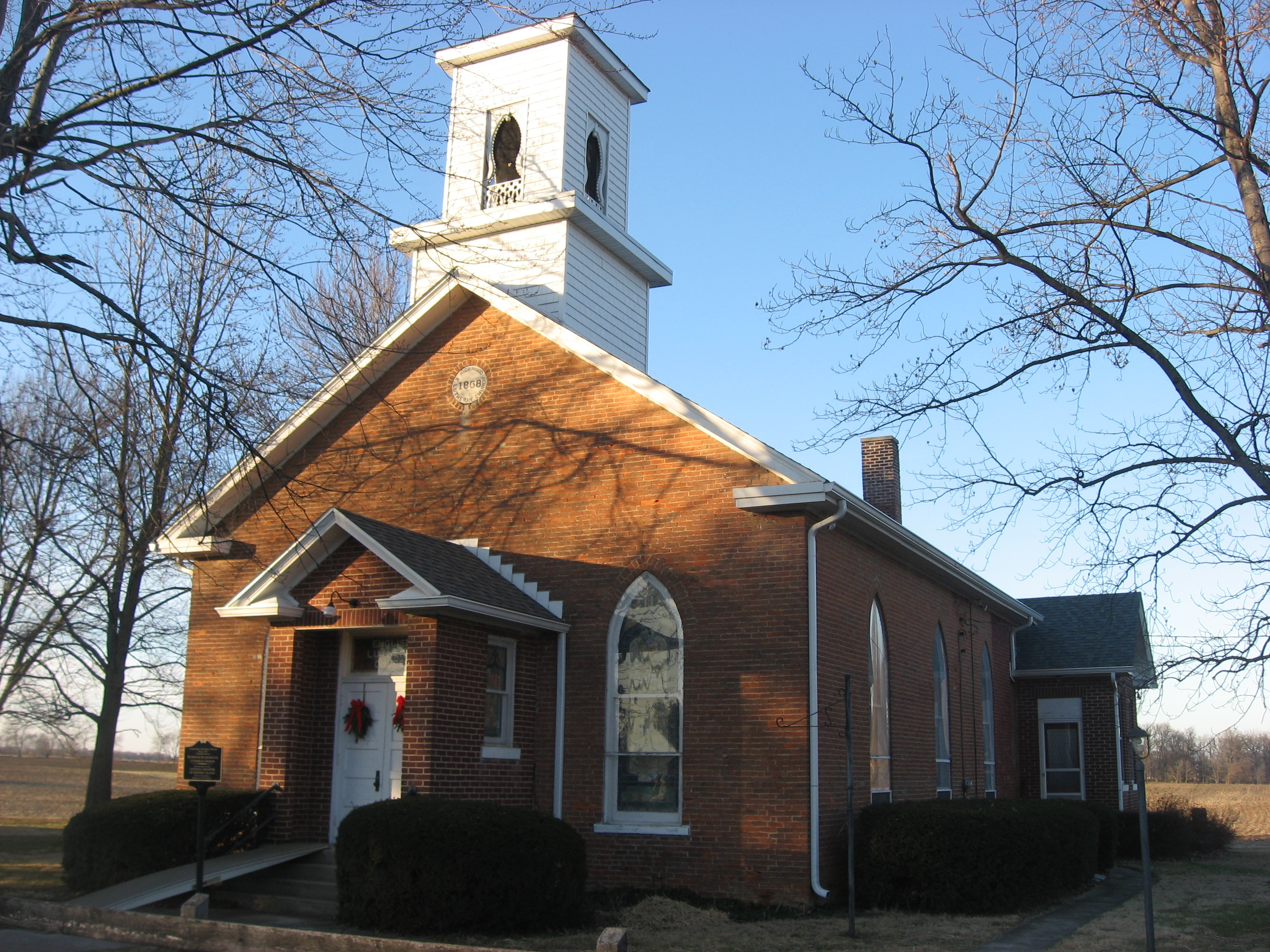

- Location within Indiana Location within the United States
- Location: 9700 West County Road 700 South, near Middleton, Salem Township, Delaware County, Indiana
- Coordinates: 40°5′31″N 85°29′58″W
- Area: less than one acre
- Built: 1868
- Built by: Shoemaker, Joe; Hopper, Garret
- Architectural style: Gothic Revival, Other, T-plan cottage
- NRHP reference No.: 04001314
- Added to NRHP: December 6, 2004

Richwood Evangelical Lutheran Church, also known as Cross Roads Lutheran Church, is a historic Lutheran church at 9700 West County Road 700 South in the unincorporated town of Cross Roads, Delaware County, Indiana, USA. It was built in 1868, and is a one-story, Gothic Revival style brick building with a bell tower. A rear addition, vestibule, and stained glass windows were added in 1915.

It was added to the National Register of Historic Places in 2004.
