= Harrison Township, Delaware County, Indiana =

Harrison Township
- Township
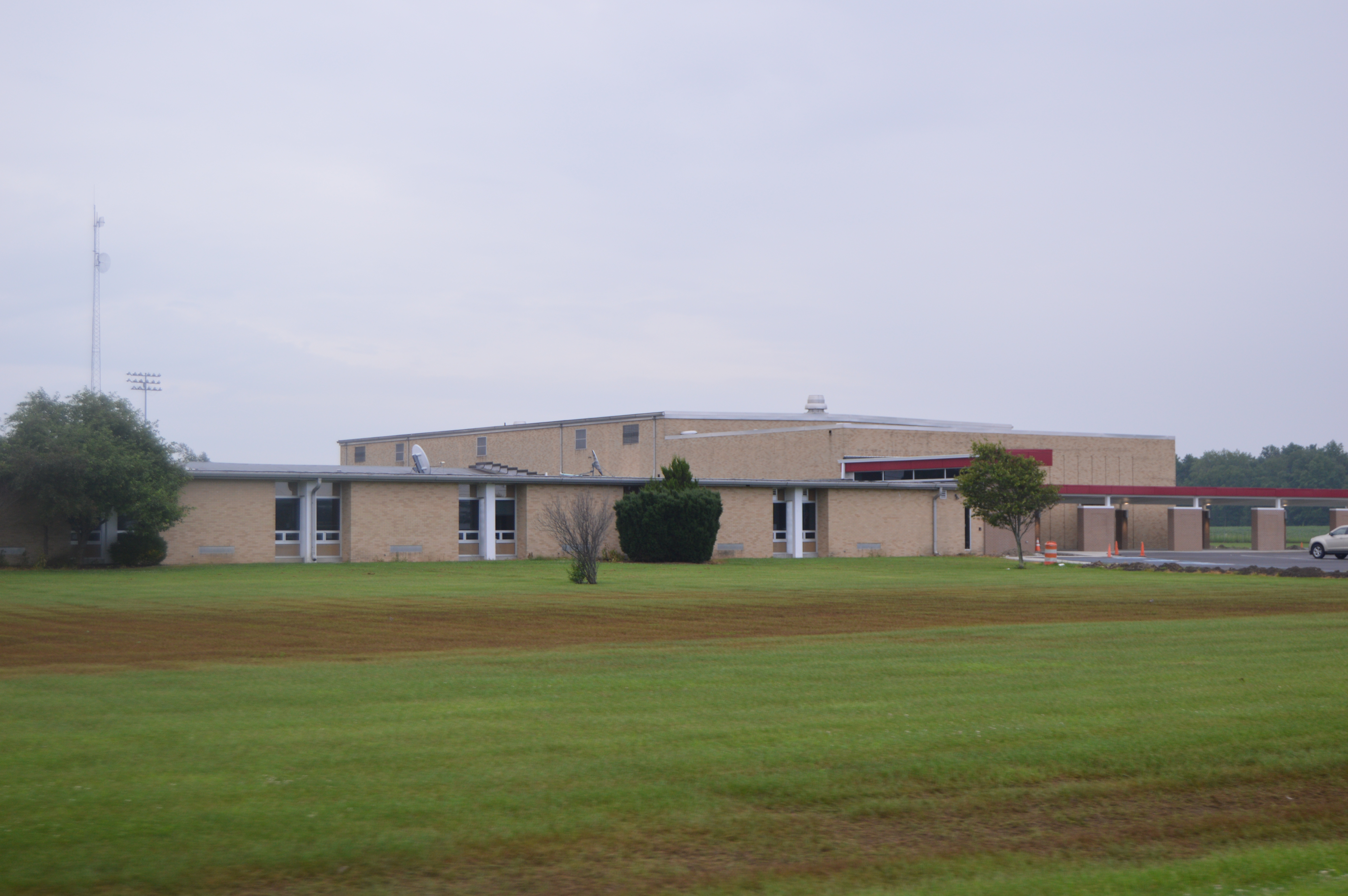
- Wes-Del Middle/High School

- Location of Harrison Township in Delaware County
- Coordinates: 40°15′36″N 85°30′35″W
- Country: United States
- State: Indiana
- County: Delaware

Government
  - Type: Indiana township

Area
  - Total: 42.42 sq mi (109.9 km^{2})
  - Land: 42.3 sq mi (110 km^{2})
  - Water: 0.12 sq mi (0.31 km^{2})
- Elevation: 896 ft (273 m)

Population (2020)
  - Total: 3,463
  - Density: 81.6/sq mi (31.5/km^{2})
- FIPS code: 18-31756
- GNIS feature ID: 453384

Harrison Township is one of twelve townships in Delaware County, Indiana. According to the 2020 census, its population was 3,463 and it contained 1,462 housing units.

== History ==
The Job Garner-Jacob W. Miller House was listed on the National Register of Historic Places in 1986.

== Geography ==
According to the 2010 census, the township has a total area of 42.42 square miles (109.9 km^{2}), of which 42.3 square miles (110 km^{2}) (or 99.72%) is land and 0.12 square miles (0.31 km^{2}) (or 0.28%) is water. Emerald Lake is in this township.

=== Cities and towns ===
- Muncie, northwest edge

=== Unincorporated towns ===
- Bethel

=== Adjacent townships ===
- Washington Township (north)
- Union Township (northeast)
- Hamilton Township (east)
- Center Township (southeast)
- Mount Pleasant Township (south)
- Richland Township, Madison County (southwest)
- Monroe Township, Madison County (west)
- Van Buren Township, Madison County (northwest)

=== Major highways ===
- Interstate 69
- U.S. Route 35
- State Road 28
- State Road 332

=== Cemeteries ===
The township contains one cemetery, Miller.

== Demographics ==
Historical population
| Census | Pop. | Note | %± |
|---|---|---|---|
| 1890 | 2,041 | | — |
| 1900 | 2,106 | | 3.2% |
| 1910 | 1,782 | | −15.4% |
| 1920 | 1,539 | | −13.6% |
| 1930 | 1,513 | | −1.7% |
| 1940 | 1,519 | | 0.4% |
| 1950 | 1,600 | | 5.3% |
| 1960 | 1,927 | | 20.4% |
| 1970 | 2,983 | | 54.8% |
| 1980 | 3,585 | | 20.2% |
| 1990 | 3,336 | | −6.9% |
| 2000 | 3,425 | | 2.7% |
| 2010 | 3,327 | | −2.9% |
| 2020 | 3,463 | | 4.1% |
U.S. Decennial Census

=== 2020 census ===
As of the census of 2020, there were 3,463 people, 1,312 households, and 646 families living in the township. The population density was 81.63 inhabitants per square mile (31.5/km^{2}). There were 1,462 housing units at an average density of 34.46 per square mile (13.3/km^{2}). The racial makeup of the township was 94.4% White, 9.8% African American, 6.4% Asian, 7.2% from other races, and 3.1% from two or more races. Hispanic or Latino of any race were 2.1% of the population.

There were 1,312 households, of which 28.6% had children under the age of 18 living with them, 49.2% were married couples living together, 9.1% had a female householder with no husband present, 3.8% had a male householder with no wife present, and 37.9% were non-families. 12.9% of all households were made up of individuals. The average household size was 2.64 and the average family size was 3.18.

21.5% of the population had never been married. 59.2% of residents were married and not separated, 9.3% were widowed, 10.0% were divorced, and 0.0% were separated.

The median age in the township was 38.9. 12.1% of residents were under the age of 5; 28.6% of residents were under the age of 18; 71.4% were age 18 or older; and 24.8% were age 65 or older. 6.4% of the population were veterans.

The most common language spoken at home was English with 98.4% speaking it at home, 0.5% spoke Spanish at home, 0.9% spoke another Indo-European language at home, and 0.2% spoke some other language. 1.4% of the population were foreign born.

The median household income in Harrison Township was $71,164, 26.7% greater than the median average for the state of Indiana. 13.2% of the population were in poverty, including 21.0% of residents under the age of 18. The poverty rate for the township was 0.3% higher than that of the state. 21.3% of the population were disabled and 6.4% had no healthcare coverage. 37.1% of the population had attained a high school or equivalent degree, 21.5% had attended college but received no degree, 9.9% had attained an associate's degree or higher, 11.6% had attained a bachelor's degree or higher, and 11.0% had a graduate or professional degree. 30.4% had no degree. 49.6% of Harrison Township residents were employed, working a mean of 38.4 hours per week. 150 housing units were vacant at a density of 3.5 per square mile (1.4/km^{2}).
