= Salem Township, Delaware County, Indiana =

Salem Township
- Township
- Location of Salem Township in Delaware County
- Coordinates: 40°07′01″N 85°30′33″W
- Country: United States
- State: Indiana
- County: Delaware

Government
  - Type: Indiana township

Area
  - Total: 35.21 sq mi (91.2 km^{2})
  - Land: 35.08 sq mi (90.9 km^{2})
  - Water: 0.14 sq mi (0.36 km^{2})
- Elevation: 938 ft (286 m)

Population (2020)
  - Total: 3,978
  - Density: 115/sq mi (44/km^{2})
- FIPS code: 18-67356
- GNIS feature ID: 453823

Salem Township is one of twelve townships in Delaware County, Indiana. According to the 2010 census, its population was 4,034 and it contained 1,729 housing units.

== History ==
The Richwood Evangelical Lutheran Church was listed on the National Register of Historic Places in 2004.

== Geography ==
According to the 2010 census, the township has a total area of 35.21 square miles (91.2 km^{2}), of which 35.08 square miles (90.9 km^{2}) (or 99.63%) is land and 0.14 square miles (0.36 km^{2}) (or 0.40%) is water.

=== Cities and towns ===
- Chesterfield (east edge)
- Daleville

=== Unincorporated towns ===
- Cross Roads

=== Adjacent townships ===
- Mount Pleasant Township (north)
- Center Township (northeast)
- Monroe Township (east)
- Jefferson Township, Henry County (southeast)
- Fall Creek Township, Henry County (south)
- Union Township, Madison County (west)
- Richland Township, Madison County (northwest)

=== Major highways ===
- Interstate 69
- State Road 32
- State Road 67

=== Cemeteries ===
The township contains three cemeteries: Saunders, Sharp and Sunderland.
