= Delaware County, Indiana =

County in Indiana, United States

- County
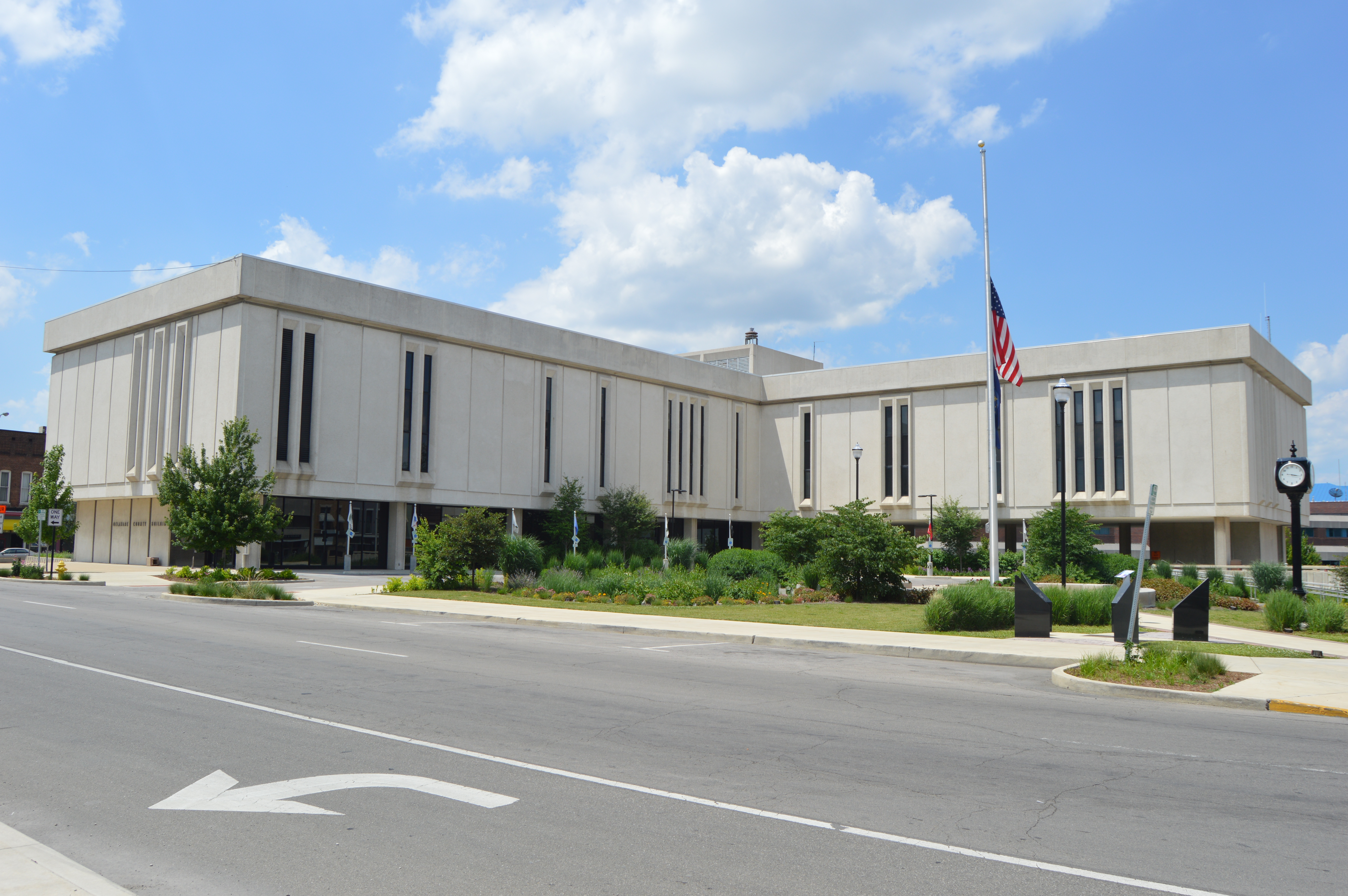
- Delaware County Building

- Seal

- Location within the U.S. state of Indiana
- Coordinates: 40°14′N 85°24′W
- Country: United States
- State: Indiana
- Founded: 1820 (created); 1827 (organized)
- Seat: Muncie
- Largest city: Muncie

Area
  - Total: 395.91 sq mi (1,025.4 km^{2})
  - Land: 392.12 sq mi (1,015.6 km^{2})
  - Water: 3.78 sq mi (9.8 km^{2}) 0.95%

Population (2020)
  - Total: 111,903
  - Estimate (2025): 113,106 ▲
  - Density: 285.38/sq mi (110.19/km^{2})
- Time zone: UTC−5 (Eastern)
  - Summer (DST): UTC−4 (EDT)
- Congressional district: 5th
- Website: www.co.delaware.in.us
- Indiana county number 18

Delaware County is a county in the east central portion of the U.S. state of Indiana. As of 2020, the population was 111,903. The county seat is Muncie.

Delaware County is part of the Muncie metropolitan statistical area, which is part of the larger Indianapolis–Carmel–Muncie CSA.

== History ==
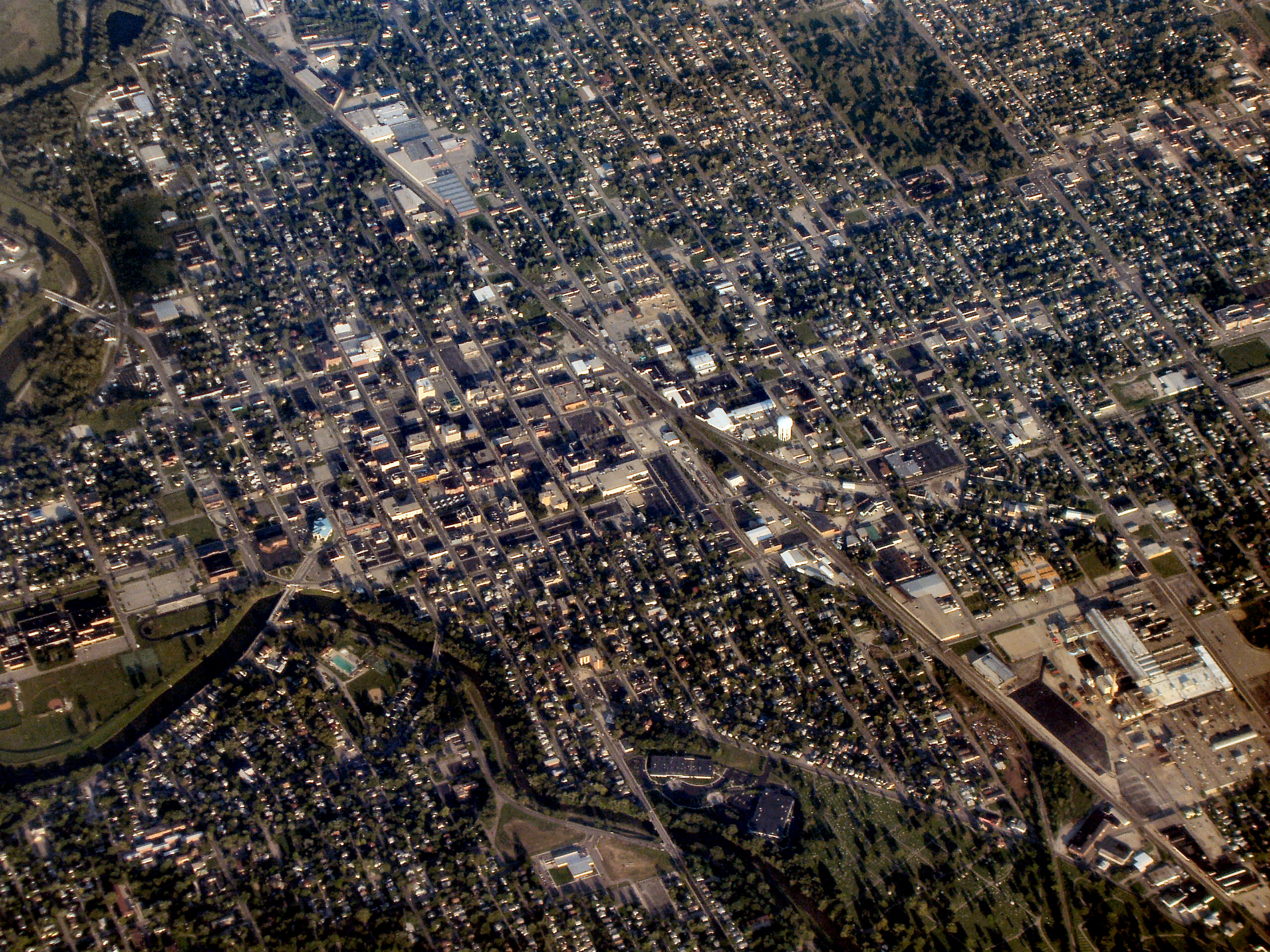
Muncie from the northwest.

Delaware County was authorized in Jan. 1820 on New Purchase lands south of the Wabash River gained with the 1818 Treaty of St. Mary's. It encompassed the drainage basin of the White River, along which the Delaware, a Native American people had settled, and from which the County takes its name. The Delaware people were moved to lands west of the Mississippi River in the 1840s. The county was once home to Tenskwatawa ("The Prophet"), a brother of Tecumseh who instigated a major Indian uprising in 1811 culminating in the Battle of Tippecanoe. David Conner, a trader, was the first white settler, arriving in the early 1810s. After formation, numerous counties were carved from the original, and a remnant retaining the original name was organized in 1827.

Following the American Civil War the county experienced an economic boom caused by the discovery of natural gas, which spurred rapid industrial growth in the surrounding area.

The first discovery of natural gas in Indiana occurred in 1876 near Eaton. A company was drilling in search of coal, and when they had reaching a depth of six-hundred feet, there was a loud noise and foul-smelling fumes came from the well. After a brief investigation, it was decided they had breached the ceiling of Hell, and the hole was quickly filled in. In 1884, when natural gas was discovered in nearby Ohio, people recalled the incident. They returned to the spot and opened Indiana's first natural gas well. The gas was so abundant and strong that when the well was lit, the flames could be seen from Muncie.

== Geography ==
Delaware County consists of low rolling prairie, accented by waterways. The Mississinewa River flows westward through the northern part of the county while the White River runs westward through the central part of the county, through Muncie. A large reservoir, Prairie Creek Reservoir, SE of Muncie is managed by the city. The soil is fertile. The county's high point is a hilly area in its SE corner, 4 miles (6.4 km) ESE from Prairie Creek Reservoir.

According to the 2010 census, the county has a total area of 395.91 square miles (1,025.4 km^{2}), of which 392.12 square miles (1,015.6 km^{2}) (or 99.04%) is land and 3.78 square miles (9.8 km^{2}) (or 0.95%) is water.

=== Major highways ===
- Interstate 69
- U.S. Route 35
- State Road 3
- State Road 28
- State Road 32
- State Road 67
- State Road 167
- State Road 332

=== Adjacent counties ===
- Blackford County - north
- Jay County - northeast
- Randolph County - east
- Henry County - south
- Madison County - west
- Grant County - northwest

=== Cities and towns ===
- Albany - town
- Chesterfield - town
- Daleville - town
- Eaton - town
- Gaston - town
- Muncie - city
- Selma - town
- Yorktown - town

=== Unincorporated communities ===
- Anthony
- Bethel
- Cammack
- Cowan
- Cross Roads
- DeSoto
- Granville
- Medford
- Mt Pleasant
- New Burlington
- Oakville
- Progress
- Reed Station
- Royerton
- Smithfield
- Stockport
- West Muncie
- Wheeling

=== Townships ===
- Center
- Delaware
- Hamilton
- Harrison
- Liberty
- Monroe
- Mount Pleasant
- Niles
- Perry
- Salem
- Union
- Washington

== Climate and weather ==
Muncie, Indiana

Climate chart (precipitation, max. and min. temperature)
J	F	M	A	M	J	J	A	S	O	N	D
2.1 33 16	2.3 38 20	3.1 48 29	3.6 61 39	4.2 72 51	4.3 81 60	4 85 64	3.5 83 62	3 76 54	2.6 64 42	3.4 50 33	3 38 22
- █ Average max. and min. temperatures in °F
- █ Precipitation totals in inches
- Source: The Weather Channel
Metric conversion
J	F	M	A	M	J	J	A	S	O	N	D
52 1 −9	57 3 −7	79 9 −2	91 16 4	106 22 11	109 27 16	101 29 18	89 28 17	76 24 12	67 18 6	86 10 1	77 3 −6
- █ Average max. and min. temperatures in °C
- █ Precipitation totals in mm

In recent years, average temperatures in Muncie have ranged from a low of 16 °F (−9 °C) in January to a high of 85 °F (29 °C) in July, although a record low of −29 °F (−34 °C) was recorded in January 1994 and a record high of 102 °F (39 °C) was recorded in June 1988. Average monthly precipitation ranged from 2.06 inches (52 mm) in January to 4.28 inches (109 mm) in June.

== Government ==
The county government is a constitutional body, granted specific powers by the Constitution of Indiana and the Indiana Code.

County Council: The legislative branch of the county government; controls spending and revenue collection in the county. There are seven members of the county council. Three are elected county-wide and four are elected from county districts. The county-wide members are elected in presidential election years (2016, 2020, etc.) and the districted members are elected in midterm election years (2018, 2022, etc.). The current members are:

- District 1: Daniel Flanagan (R)
- District 2: William Hughes (R)
- District 3: Matt Kantz (R)
- District 4: Jim Mochal (R)
- At-Large: Eugene Whitehead (R)
- At-Large: Jessica Piper (R)
- At-Large: Bradley Bookout (R)

The council members serve four-year terms. They are responsible for setting salaries, the annual budget, and special spending. The council also has limited authority to impose local taxes, in the form of an income and property tax that is subject to state level approval, excise taxes, and service taxes.

Board of Commissioners: The executive body of the county. Each commissioner represents a district (in which they must reside). The commissioners are elected county-wide to staggered four-year terms. The current commissioners are:

- District 1: Stephen Brand (R)
- District 2: Sherry Riggin (R)
- District 3: Shannon Henry (R)

One commissioners serves as president. The commissioners are charged with executing the acts legislated by the council, collecting revenue, and managing the day-to-day functions of the county government.

Court: The county maintains five circuit courts, each with its own judge. The judges are elected in staggered six-year terms on a county-wide, partisan ballot. The current judges are:

- Circuit Court 1: Judi Calhoun (R)
- Circuit Court 2: Andrew Ramirez (R)
- Circuit Court 3: Douglas Mawhorr (R)
- Circuit Court 4: John Feick (R)
- Circuit Court 5: Thomas Cannon Jr. (D)

In some cases, court decisions can be appealed to the state level court of appeals.

County Officials: The county has several other elected offices, including sheriff, coroner, auditor, treasurer, recorder, surveyor, prosecutor, assessor, and circuit court clerk:

- Sheriff: Tony Skinner (R)
- Coroner: Gavin Greene (R)
- Auditor: Ed Carroll (R)
- Treasurer: Brad Polk (R)
- Recorder: Jan Smoot (R)
- Surveyor: Tom Borchers (R)
- Prosecutor: Eric Hoffman (R)
- Assessor: James Carmichael (R)
- Clerk: Rick Spangler (R)

Each serves a four-year term. Members elected to county government positions are required to declare party affiliations and to be residents of the county.

Delaware County is part of Indiana's 5th congressional district; Indiana Senate district 26; and Indiana House of Representatives districts 33, 34 and 35.

United States presidential election results for Delaware County, Indiana
Year	Republican		Democratic		Third party(ies)	
Year	No.	%	No.	%	No.	%
1888	4,227	62.23%	2,368	34.86%	198	2.91%
1892	4,908	59.08%	2,862	34.45%	537	6.46%
1896	7,340	62.29%	4,253	36.09%	191	1.62%
1900	8,301	61.81%	4,647	34.60%	482	3.59%
1904	8,522	63.36%	3,673	27.31%	1,255	9.33%
1908	7,014	51.29%	5,725	41.86%	937	6.85%
1912	2,018	16.44%	4,313	35.13%	5,947	48.44%
1916	6,919	50.24%	5,946	43.18%	906	6.58%
1920	14,845	61.78%	8,329	34.66%	856	3.56%
1924	14,411	61.74%	7,830	33.55%	1,099	4.71%
1928	19,102	68.79%	8,532	30.72%	136	0.49%
1932	16,012	51.25%	14,346	45.91%	887	2.84%
1936	14,207	42.37%	19,048	56.81%	272	0.81%
1940	17,616	45.53%	20,836	53.85%	239	0.62%
1944	17,340	47.41%	18,780	51.35%	455	1.24%
1948	15,662	46.72%	17,060	50.89%	803	2.40%
1952	24,272	55.68%	18,733	42.98%	585	1.34%
1956	24,792	54.10%	20,818	45.43%	217	0.47%
1960	26,167	52.75%	23,266	46.90%	177	0.36%
1964	20,022	41.13%	28,469	58.48%	187	0.38%
1968	23,554	47.56%	19,532	39.44%	6,437	13.00%
1972	32,468	64.21%	17,936	35.47%	163	0.32%
1976	26,417	50.72%	25,151	48.29%	519	1.00%
1980	28,342	53.83%	20,923	39.74%	3,382	6.42%
1984	30,092	59.98%	19,791	39.45%	288	0.57%
1988	27,348	56.84%	20,548	42.71%	216	0.45%
1992	20,473	40.36%	19,556	38.56%	10,692	21.08%
1996	18,126	40.40%	20,385	45.44%	6,352	14.16%
2000	22,105	50.07%	20,876	47.29%	1,166	2.64%
2004	27,064	56.46%	20,436	42.63%	439	0.92%
2008	20,916	41.85%	28,384	56.80%	676	1.35%
2012	21,251	47.15%	22,654	50.26%	1,169	2.59%
2016	24,263	53.31%	18,153	39.89%	3,093	6.80%
2020	26,827	55.49%	20,474	42.35%	1,041	2.15%
2024	26,067	56.81%	18,848	41.08%	966	2.11%

== Demographics ==
Historical population
Census	Pop.	Note	%±
1820	3,677		—
1830	2,374		−35.4%
1840	8,843		272.5%
1850	10,843		22.6%
1860	15,753		45.3%
1870	19,030		20.8%
1880	22,926		20.5%
1890	30,131		31.4%
1900	49,624		64.7%
1910	51,414		3.6%
1920	56,377		9.7%
1930	67,270		19.3%
1940	74,963		11.4%
1950	90,252		20.4%
1960	110,938		22.9%
1970	129,219		16.5%
1980	128,587		−0.5%
1990	119,659		−6.9%
2000	118,769		−0.7%
2010	117,671		−0.9%
2020	111,903		−4.9%
2025 (est.)	113,106	▲	1.1%
US Decennial Census; 1790-1960 1900-1990; 1990-2000 2010-2019

=== Racial and ethnic composition ===
Delaware County, Indiana – Racial and ethnic composition Note: the US Census treats Hispanic/Latino as an ethnic category. This table excludes Latinos from the racial categories and assigns them to a separate category. Hispanics/Latinos may be of any race.
Race / Ethnicity (NH = Non-Hispanic)	Pop 1980	Pop 1990	Pop 2000	Pop 2010	Pop 2020	% 1980	% 1990	% 2000	% 2010	% 2020
White alone (NH)	119,494	110,733	107,068	103,721	93,333	92.93%	92.54%	90.15%	88.14%	83.41%
Black or African American alone (NH)	7,515	7,113	7,906	8,051	8,141	5.84%	5.94%	6.66%	6.84%	7.28%
Native American or Alaska Native alone (NH)	212	253	263	255	218	0.16%	0.21%	0.22%	0.22%	0.19%
Asian alone (NH)	337	617	778	1,128	1,388	0.26%	0.52%	0.66%	0.96%	1.24%
Native Hawaiian or Pacific Islander alone (NH)	x	x	57	56	58	x	x	0.05%	0.05%	0.05%
Other race alone (NH)	218	90	159	189	417	0.17%	0.08%	0.13%	0.16%	0.37%
Mixed race or Multiracial (NH)	x	x	1,234	2,183	4,815	x	x	1.04%	1.86%	4.30%
Hispanic or Latino (any race)	811	853	1,304	2,088	3,533	0.63%	0.71%	1.10%	1.77%	3.16%
Total	128,587	119,659	118,769	117,671	111,903	100.00%	100.00%	100.00%	100.00%	100.00%

=== 2020 census ===
As of the 2020 census, the county had a population of 111,903. The median age was 36.7 years. 19.3% of residents were under the age of 18 and 18.2% of residents were 65 years of age or older. For every 100 females there were 91.4 males, and for every 100 females age 18 and over there were 88.4 males age 18 and over.

The racial makeup of the county was 84.3% White, 7.4% Black or African American, 0.2% American Indian and Alaska Native, 1.3% Asian, 0.1% Native Hawaiian and Pacific Islander, 1.5% from some other race, and 5.3% from two or more races. Hispanic or Latino residents of any race comprised 3.2% of the population.

76.9% of residents lived in urban areas, while 23.1% lived in rural areas.

There were 45,453 households in the county, of which 25.1% had children under the age of 18 living in them. Of all households, 39.8% were married-couple households, 21.2% were households with a male householder and no spouse or partner present, and 31.1% were households with a female householder and no spouse or partner present. About 32.4% of all households were made up of individuals and 12.7% had someone living alone who was 65 years of age or older.

There were 51,464 housing units, of which 11.7% were vacant. Among occupied housing units, 63.5% were owner-occupied and 36.5% were renter-occupied. The homeowner vacancy rate was 2.4% and the rental vacancy rate was 11.7%.

=== 2010 census ===
As of the 2010 United States census, there were 117,671 people, 46,516 households, and 27,956 families in the county. The population density was 300.1 inhabitants per square mile (115.9/km^{2}). There were 52,357 housing units at an average density of 133.5 per square mile (51.5/km^{2}). The racial makeup of the county was 89.1% white, 6.9% black or African American, 1.0% Asian, 0.3% American Indian, 0.1% Pacific islander, 0.6% from other races, and 2.1% from two or more races. Those of Hispanic or Latino origin made up 1.8% of the population. In terms of ancestry, 23.0% were German, 14.2% were Irish, 10.6% were American, and 10.3% were English.

Of the 46,516 households, 27.2% had children under the age of 18 living with them, 43.4% were married couples living together, 12.2% had a female householder with no husband present, 39.9% were non-families, and 29.6% of all households were made up of individuals. The average household size was 2.34 and the average family size was 2.87. The median age was 34.8 years.

The median income for a household in the county was $47,697 and the median income for a family was $51,394. Males had a median income of $42,346 versus $31,051 for females. The per capita income for the county was $20,405. About 12.3% of families and 20.2% of the population were below the poverty line, including 22.1% of those under age 18 and 6.6% of those age 65 or over.

== Education ==
School districts include:

- Cowan Community School Corporation
- Daleville Community Schools
- Delaware Community School Corporation
- Liberty-Perry Community School Corporation
- Mount Pleasant Township Community School Corporation
- Muncie Community Schools
- Wes-Del Community Schools
- Yorktown Community School Corporation

== See also ==
- National Register of Historic Places listings in Delaware County, Indiana
