= Granville, Delaware County, Indiana =

Granville
- Unincorporated community
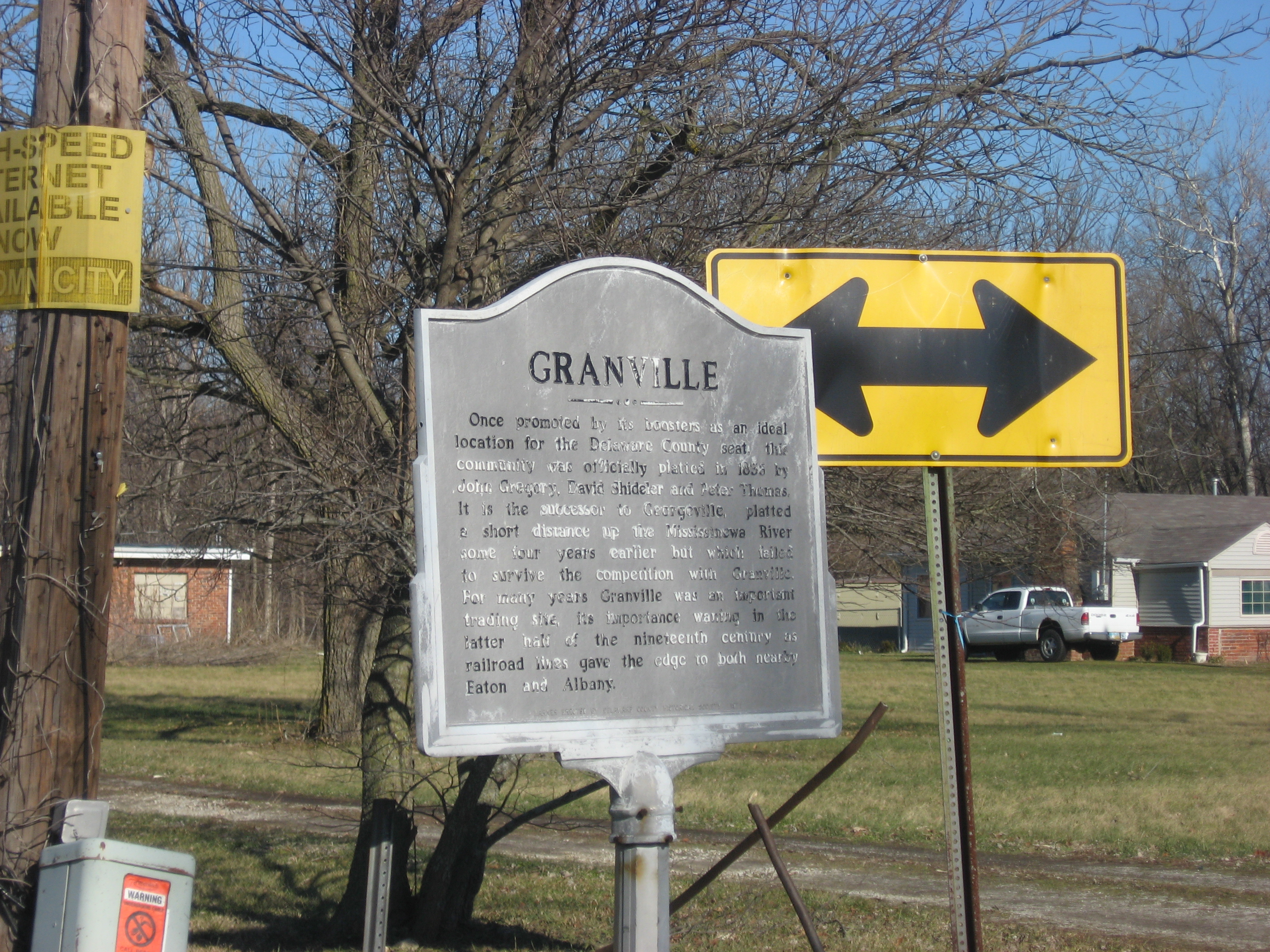
- A historical marker in the center of the community

- Location within Indiana Location within the United States
- Coordinates: 40°19′02″N 85°19′07″W
- Country: United States
- State: Indiana
- County: Delaware
- Township: Niles
- Founded by: John Gregory
- Elevation: 902 ft (275 m)
- ZIP code: 47338
- FIPS code: 18-28926
- GNIS feature ID: 435332

Granville is an unincorporated community in Niles Township, Delaware County, Indiana.

== History ==
Granville was founded in 1836. It was named for Granville Hastings, who held several area business interests.

Granville, Indiana, was founded in 1836. Its early history is closely tied to the nearby settlement of Georgetown, which was established by George Deeds in 1833. Many of Georgetown's residents relocated to the site of Granville by floating their homes down the Mississinewa River. The first house in Georgetown was built in 1833 by Price Thomas, who hewed its logs at that location before the move to Granville.

Granville was officially platted in 1836 and was named after Granville Hastings, who established two mills and a store in the community. The town was founded by John Gregory in the same year. Although a local legend suggests that Granville once competed with Muncietown (now Muncie) for the county seat, this is historically inaccurate, as Muncie was designated the county seat in the 1820s, well before Granville was platted.

Another nearby settlement, Georgeville, existed in the early 1830s in Niles Township, about a mile up the Mississinewa River from Granville. It predated both Granville and Albany, but its residents eventually moved to Granville in search of a more prosperous community. Over time, Granville lost many of its institutions, including its hotel, retail stores, physician's office, Masonic Lodge, blacksmith shop, and sawmill. However, it remains inhabited and is not considered a ghost town.
