= Daleville High School =

Daleville Junior-Senior High School

Location
- 8400 South Bronco Drive; Daleville, Indiana 47334; United States
- Coordinates: 40.118427°N 85.554641°W

Information
- Type: Public high school
- School district: Daleville Community Schools
- Principal: Jeremy Gondol
- Faculty: 30.00 (on an FTE basis)
- Grades: 7-12
- Enrollment: 447 (2023–2024)
- Student to teacher ratio: 14.90
- Color
- Team name: Broncos
- Website: www.daleville.k12.in.us/o/dhs

Daleville Junior-Senior High School is a middle school and high school located in Daleville, Indiana, United States. It is a part of Daleville Community Schools.

The school district includes Daleville and the Delaware County portion of Chesterfield.

== See also ==
- List of high schools in Indiana
- Mid-Eastern Conference
