= Daleville Community Schools =

School district in Indiana

Address
- 14300 W 2nd St Daleville, Indiana, 47334; United States

District information
- Grades: PK–12
- Superintendent: Robert Paul Garrison
- Schools: 2
- NCES District ID: 1809840

Students and staff
- Enrollment: 1,003 (2023–24)
- Teachers: 60.00 (on an FTE basis)
- Student–teacher ratio: 16.72

Other information
- Website: www.daleville.k12.in.us

Daleville Community Schools is a public school district in Salem Township, Delaware County, Indiana, United States, based in Daleville, Indiana.

It includes Daleville and the Delaware County portion of Chesterfield.

The Daleville district was formerly called Salem Community School Corporation.

== History ==
A school board was installed in 1968. At that time, the district became known as the Salem school district.

In 1984, superintendent Robert Mantock took a job at Ball State University and left his position on June 1 of that year.

Prior to 1985, the school district released grades each nine weeks, but that year it changed to six week periods.

There had been confusion with the Salem Community Schools school district in Washington County, with the state government sending the wrong materials to the districts. In 1988 the Salem School District of Delaware County began considering changing its name to end such occurrences. In December of that year, all members of the school board voted to enact the change.

== Schools ==
The Daleville Community Schools School District has one elementary school and one junior/senior high school

- Daleville Elementary School
- Daleville High School
