= Liberty Township, Delaware County, Indiana =

Liberty Township
- Township
- Location of Liberty Township in Delaware County
- Coordinates: 40°11′28″N 85°16′21″W
- Country: United States
- State: Indiana
- County: Delaware

Government
  - Type: Indiana township

Area
  - Total: 35.03 sq mi (90.7 km^{2})
  - Land: 34.88 sq mi (90.3 km^{2})
  - Water: 0.15 sq mi (0.39 km^{2})
- Elevation: 1,014 ft (309 m)

Population (2020)
  - Total: 4,414
  - Density: 126.01/sq mi (48.65/km^{2})
- FIPS code: 18-43236
- GNIS feature ID: 453552

Liberty Township is one of twelve townships in Delaware County, Indiana. According to the 2010 census, its population was 4,414 and it contained 1,997 housing units.

Liberty Township was established in 1825.

== Geography ==
According to the 2010 census, the township has a total area of 35.03 square miles (90.7 km^{2}), of which 34.88 square miles (90.3 km^{2}) (or 99.57%) is land and 0.15 square miles (0.39 km^{2}) (or 0.43%) is water.

=== Cities and towns ===
- Muncie (east edge)
- Selma

=== Unincorporated towns ===
- Hyde Park
- Smithfield
- Woodland Park

=== Adjacent townships ===
- Delaware Township (north)
- Monroe Township, Randolph County (east)
- Stoney Creek Township, Randolph County (southeast)
- Perry Township (south)
- Monroe Township (southwest)
- Center Township (west)
- Hamilton Township (northwest)

=== Major highways ===
- Indiana State Road 32

=== Cemeteries ===
The township contains eight cemeteries: Bortsfield, Freidline, Graham, Mount Tabor, Orr, Sparr, Truitt and White.

== Demographics ==
Historical population
Census	Pop.	Note	%±
1890	1,615		—
1900	1,643		1.7%
1910	1,738		5.8%
1920	1,567		−9.8%
1930	1,784		13.8%
1940	2,250		26.1%
1950	3,003		33.5%
1960	4,033		34.3%
1970	5,620		39.4%
1980	5,487		−2.4%
1990	4,917		−10.4%
2000	4,919		0.0%
2010	4,685		−4.8%
2020	4,414		−5.8%
U.S. Decennial Census

=== 2020 census ===
As of the census of 2020, there were 4,414 people, 1,845 households, and 979 families living in the township. The population density was 126.01 inhabitants per square mile (48.7/km^{2}). There were 1,997 housing units at an average density of 57.01 per square mile (22.0/km^{2}).

The median age in the township was 45.9. 1.7% of residents were under the age of 5; 20.9% of residents were under the age of 18; 79.1% were age 18 or older; and 21.8% were age 65 or older. 5.6% of the population were veterans.

The most common language spoken at home was English with 96.4% speaking it at home, 1.5% spoke Spanish at home, 2.0% spoke an Asian or Pacific Islander language at home, and 0.1% spoke another Indo-European language. 1.2% of the population were foreign born.

The median household income in Liberty Township was $49,778, 11.4% less than the median average for the state of Indiana. 14.2% of the population were in poverty, including 14.5% of residents under the age of 18. The poverty rate for the township was 1.3% higher than that of the state. 46.8% of the population had attained a high school or equivalent degree, 21.6% had attended college but received no degree, 7.9% had attained an Associate's degree or higher, 9.2% had attained a Bachelor's degree or higher, and 5.7% had a graduate or professional degree. 8.8% had no degree. 51.1% of Liberty Township residents were employed, working a mean of 3.47 hours per week. 152 housing units were vacant at a density of 4.34 per square mile (1.7/km^{2}).
