= Daleville, Indiana =

- Town
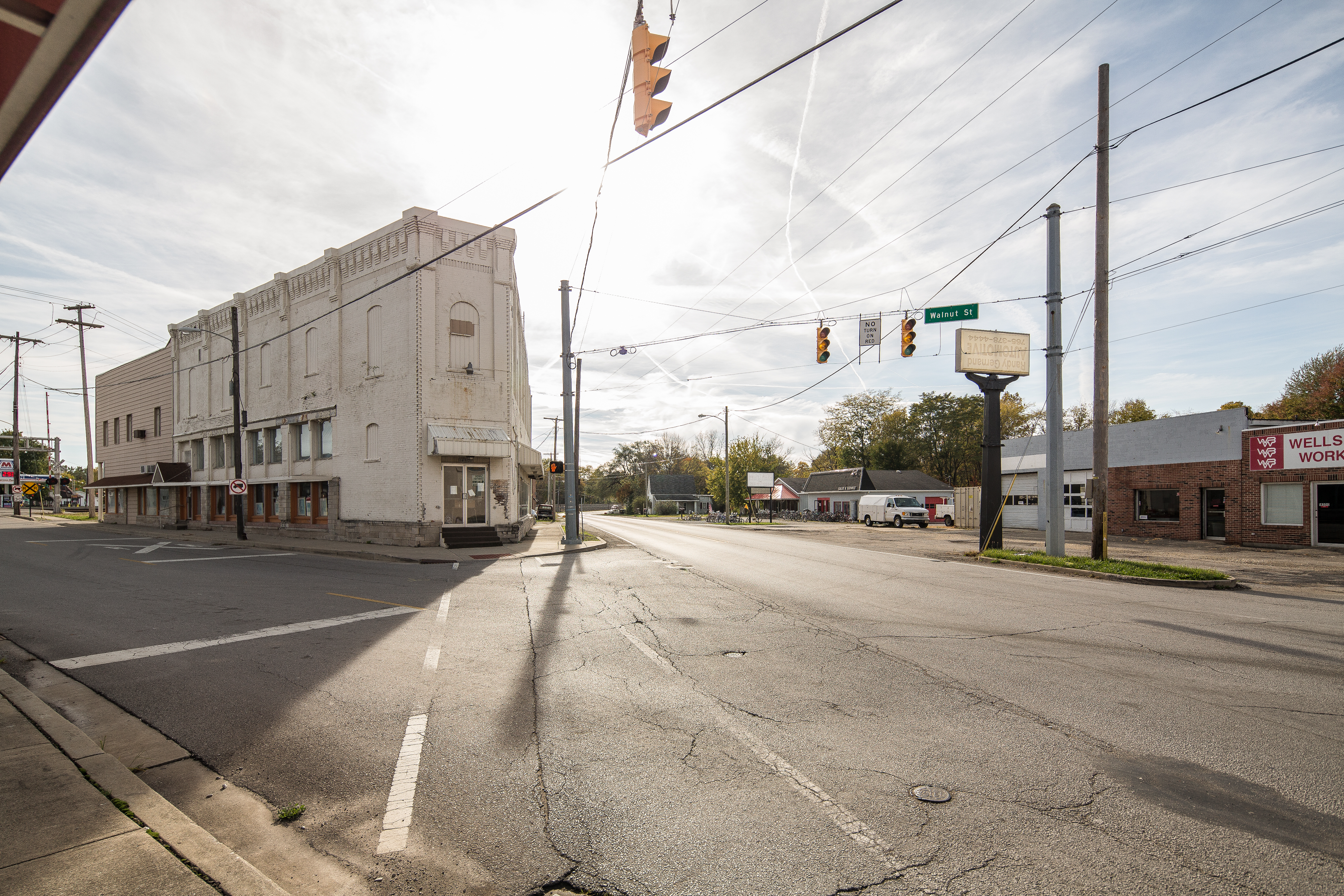
- Downtown Daleville

- Location of Daleville in Delaware County, Indiana.

- Location within Indiana
- Coordinates: 40°07′25″N 85°33′12″W
- Country: United States
- State: Indiana
- County: Delaware
- Township: Salem
- Platted: 1838
- Incorporated: 1982
- Named for: Campbell Dale

Area
  - Total: 2.15 sq mi (5.57 km^{2})
  - Land: 2.13 sq mi (5.51 km^{2})
  - Water: 0.023 sq mi (0.06 km^{2})
- Elevation: 915 ft (279 m)

Population (2020)
  - Total: 1,651
  - Estimate (2025): 1,730 ▲
  - Density: 775.7/sq mi (299.51/km^{2})
- Time zone: UTC-5 (EST)
  - Summer (DST): UTC-5 (EST)
- ZIP code: 47334
- Area code: 765
- FIPS code: 18-16642
- GNIS feature ID: 2396675
- Website: www.dalevilleindiana.org

Daleville is a town in Salem Township, Delaware County, Indiana, United States. The population was 1,651 at the 2020 census. It is part of the Muncie, IN, Metropolitan Statistical Area.

== History ==
Daleville was founded by American Revolutionary War veteran Alexander "Campbell" Dale.

Daleville was named after Campbell Dale, when his family settled at the site in the 1820s. It was platted in 1838.

Daleville is the newest town in Indiana, as it was officially incorporated as a town in 1982 to avoid annexation by its neighbor Chesterfield.

The Daleville Broncos high school baseball team won the 2016 and 2018 Indiana high school athletic association 1a baseball state titles.

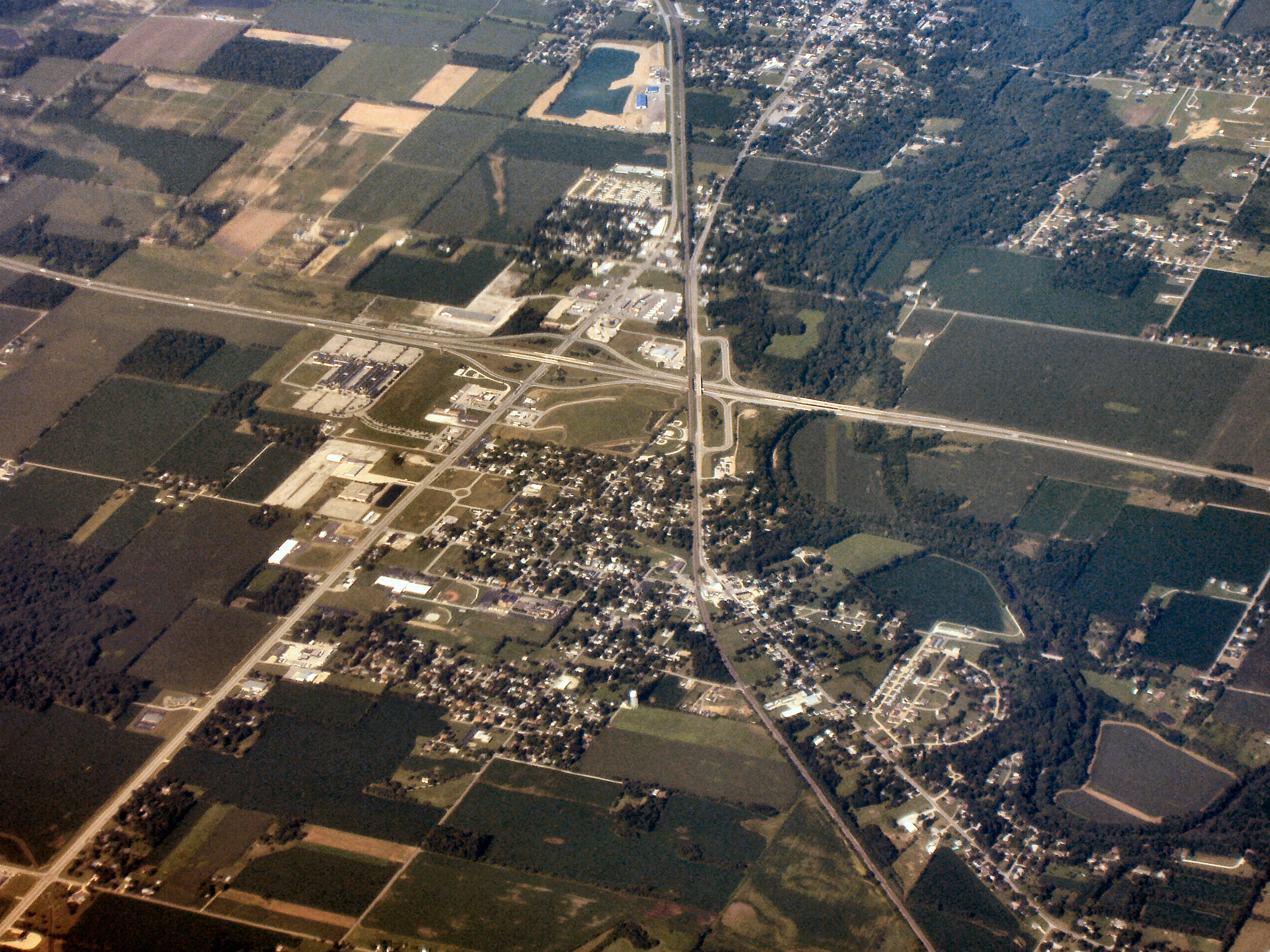
Daleville from above, looking southwest

== Geography ==
According to the 2010 census, Daleville has a total area of 2.07 square miles (5.36 km^{2}), of which 2.05 square miles (5.31 km^{2}) (or 99.03%) is land and 0.02 square miles (0.05 km^{2}) (or 0.97%) is water.

== Demographics ==
Historical population
Census	Pop.	Note	%±
1880	297		—
1990	1,681		—
2000	1,658		−1.4%
2010	1,647		−0.7%
2020	1,651		0.2%
2025 (est.)	1,730	▲	4.8%
U.S. Decennial Census

=== 2020 census ===
As of the 2020 census, there were 1,651 people and 344 families living in the town. The population density was 767.9 inhabitants per square mile (296.5/km^{2}).

The median age was 41.8 years. 6.5% of residents were under the age of 5, 22.2% were under the age of 18, and 17.7% were 65 years of age or older. For every 100 females there were 90.2 males, and for every 100 females age 18 and over there were 90.8 males age 18 and over.

97.8% of residents lived in urban areas, while 2.2% lived in rural areas.

There were 709 households in Daleville, of which 28.5% had children under the age of 18 living in them. Of all households, 41.0% were married-couple households, 20.7% were households with a male householder and no spouse or partner present, and 28.5% were households with a female householder and no spouse or partner present. About 32.0% of all households were made up of individuals, and 12.5% had someone living alone who was 65 years of age or older. The average household size was 2.33 and the average family size was 2.82.

There were 768 housing units, of which 7.7% were vacant. The homeowner vacancy rate was 2.9% and the rental vacancy rate was 2.7%.

Racial composition as of the 2020 census
Race	Number	Percent
White	1,525	92.4%
Black or African American	34	2.1%
American Indian and Alaska Native	1	0.1%
Asian	11	0.7%
Native Hawaiian and Other Pacific Islander	0	0.0%
Some other race	5	0.3%
Two or more races	75	4.5%
Hispanic or Latino (of any race)	34	2.1%

=== Demographic estimates ===
24.2% of the population had never been married. 51.5% of residents were married and not separated, 8.2% were widowed, 14.4% were divorced, and 1.8% were separated.

6.9% of the population were veterans.

The most common language spoken at home was English with 96.8% speaking it at home, 2.5% spoke Spanish at home, 0.5% spoke another Indo-European language at home, and 0.3% spoke an Asian or Pacific Islander language at home. 1.9% of the population were foreign born.

=== Income and poverty ===
The median household income in Daleville was $48,333, 14.0% less than the median average for the state of Indiana. 13.3% of the population were in poverty, including 24.7% of residents under the age of 18. The poverty rate for the town was 0.4% higher than that of the state. 18.3% of the population was disabled and 8.3% had no healthcare coverage. 41.7% of the population had attained a high school or equivalent degree, 24.2% had attended college but received no degree, 10.0% had attained an Associate's degree or higher, 8.9% had attained a Bachelor's degree or higher, and 9.8% had a graduate or professional degree. 5.6% had no degree. 58.5% of Daleville residents were employed, working a mean of 38.2 hours per week. The median gross rent in Daleville was $713 and the homeownership rate was 72.2%.

=== 2010 census ===
As of the census of 2010, there were 1,647 people, 671 households, and 457 families living in the town. The population density was 803.4 inhabitants per square mile (310.2/km^{2}). There were 716 housing units at an average density of 349.3 per square mile (134.9/km^{2}). The racial makeup of the town was 97.6% White, 0.4% African American, 0.1% Native American, 0.7% Asian, 0.1% Pacific Islander, 0.1% from other races, and 1.0% from two or more races. Hispanic or Latino of any race were 0.5% of the population.

There were 671 households, of which 30.8% had children under the age of 18 living with them, 50.4% were married couples living together, 12.1% had a female householder with no husband present, 5.7% had a male householder with no wife present, and 31.9% were non-families. 28.0% of all households were made up of individuals, and 9.4% had someone living alone who was 65 years of age or older. The average household size was 2.45 and the average family size was 2.97.

The median age in the town was 40 years. 22.9% of residents were under the age of 18; 8.6% were between the ages of 18 and 24; 24.2% were from 25 to 44; 29.5% were from 45 to 64; and 14.7% were 65 years of age or older. The gender makeup of the town was 47.8% male and 52.2% female.

=== 2000 census ===
As of the census of 2000, there were 1,658 people, 650 households, and 453 families living in the town. The population density was 832.4 inhabitants per square mile (321.4/km^{2}). There were 688 housing units at an average density of 345.4 per square mile (133.4/km^{2}). The racial makeup of the town was 98.97% White, 0.12% African American, 0.24% Native American, 0.06% Asian, 0.36% from other races, and 0.24% from two or more races. Hispanic or Latino of any race were 0.72% of the population.

There were 650 households, out of which 35.2% had children under the age of 18 living with them, 57.2% were married couples living together, 9.5% had a female householder with no husband present, and 30.2% were non-families. 25.8% of all households were made up of individuals, and 11.5% had someone living alone who was 65 years of age or older. The average household size was 2.55 and the average family size was 3.09.

In the town, the population was spread out, with 28.0% under the age of 18, 8.1% from 18 to 24, 30.3% from 25 to 44, 21.8% from 45 to 64, and 11.8% who were 65 years of age or older. The median age was 35 years. For every 100 females, there were 90.6 males. For every 100 females age 18 and over, there were 89.7 males.

The median income for a household in the town was $40,592, and the median income for a family was $48,289. Males had a median income of $36,500 versus $23,182 for females. The per capita income for the town was $18,020. About 2.3% of families and 2.7% of the population were below the poverty line, including 1.6% of those under age 18 and 6.2% of those age 65 or over.

== Education ==
Daleville Public Schools belong to the Daleville Community Schools school district. The district has one elementary school and one junior/senior high school. Students attend Daleville High School.
