= New Burlington, Indiana =

Unincorporated community in Indiana, U.S.

New Burlington
- Unincorporated community
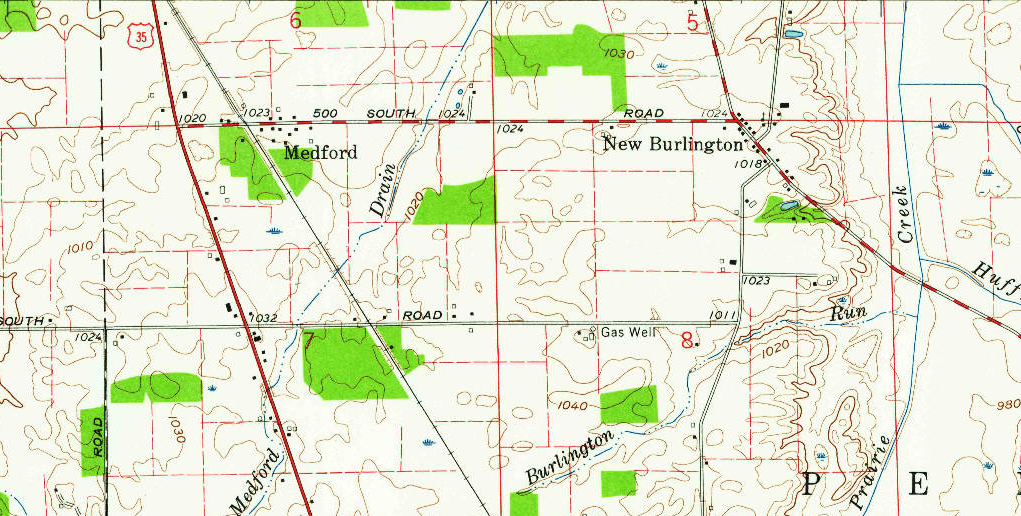
- Excerpt from 1960 USGS map showing Medford and New Burlington, Indiana.

- Location within Indiana Location within the United States
- Coordinates: 40°07′12.22″N 85°18′28.97″W
- Country: United States
- State: Indiana
- County: Delaware
- Township: Perry
- Founded by: George Ribble
- Named after: New Burlington Pike
- ZIP code: 47302
- GNIS feature ID: 440029

New Burlington is an unincorporated community in Delaware County, Indiana, United States.

== History ==
New Burlington, Indiana, was platted in August 1837 by George Ribble, making it the oldest of the three communities in Perry Township. It was soon followed by Mount Pleasant in September 1837 and much later by Medford in 1901. A post office was established at New Burlington in 1838, and remained in operation until it was discontinued in 1901.

The town developed along the New Burlington Pike, a major early road connecting Muncie and Richmond. The area was a significant stop for travelers, with numerous taverns and inns along the route. Additionally, John Newcomb opened the first general store in the community. However, after a railroad was built through Perry Township, the village's economic and transportation activity shifted, contributing to its decline.

Settlers arrived in New Burlington during the 1820s, with the first school in Delaware County built nearby in 1827. Local tradition holds that Isaac Van Arsdall, a native of the area, was the first pioneer child born in the county. The village, which began as a small settlement, grew to serve travelers and farmers, with wagon and blacksmith shops, two general stores, and two taverns. However, the arrival of the railroad in the 1850s bypassed New Burlington, leading to a decline in its commercial prominence.

New Burlington reached its peak activity between 1840 and 1880. The first school, a log structure with greased paper-covered windows, had a troubled history, including an incident where students threw the schoolmaster into Prairie Creek, leading to his death. During this period, the town had two taverns, blacksmiths, a shoemaker, a wagonmaker, and even a photographer's studio. The Presbyterian Church, the first in New Burlington, was constructed during this time, as well as the New Burlington Cemetery (which was active from 1840 to 1910). The Masonic Hall, completed in 1859, served as a community space for various local events. However, as transportation methods improved and businesses shifted to other regions, New Burlington experienced a steady decline. In 1848, Dr. Samuel Vaughn Jump set up a practice in New Burlington, becoming Delaware County's first resident physician. Dr. Jump would later served as New Burlington's postmaster and was also elected to the Indiana General Assembly. His home, the Dr. Samuel Vaughn Jump House (built 1848 in the Greek Revival style), still stands today in Perry Township. The home was added to the National Register of Historic Places in 1982.

A significant turning point for the town came in the late 1950s with the development of the Prairie Creek Reservoir, placing New Burlington near one of the largest bodies of water in Delaware County. The community today consists mainly of private homes, with the New Burlington United Methodist Church, built in 1872, and the Whitney Masonic Lodge, built in 1956, serving as notable landmarks.

In 1994, former resident Clifford Williams left a $350,000 donation that funded the Clifford Williams Community Center, which opened in the early 2000s. This center hosts adult education classes and wedding receptions, with plans for future child-care or preschool facilities.

Throughout the 20th century, New Burlington saw little change. The Masonic Lodge moved to a new building in 1956, while the church remained in its original location. The general store, which had been a staple of the community, closed in the 1960s due to population decline following the construction of the Prairie Creek Reservoir.

The home of Dr. Samuel V. Jump, a prominent physician and Freemason in New Burlington, Indiana, is listed on the National Register of Historic Places. Built in the mid-19th century, the house reflects the architectural style and historical significance of the era. Dr. Jump was instrumental in founding Whitney Lodge No. 229 and played a vital role in the local community. The home's preservation recognizes its importance as both a historical residence and a testament to Dr. Jump's contributions to medicine and Freemasonry in Delaware County.

Whitney Lodge No. 229, one of the earliest Masonic lodges in Delaware County, was established in New Burlington in 1857 by Dr. Samuel V. Jump, Thomas Whitney, and John S. Hutchings. The lodge initially met in a rented space before constructing a two-story hall in 1861, which remained in use for 90 years. Over the years, the lodge played a central role in the community, hosting events such as St. John the Baptist Day observances and social gatherings. In 1956, the lodge moved to a new building, which remains a local landmark. Despite New Burlington's small size, the Masonic membership often exceeded the town's population.
