= Dr. Samuel Vaughn Jump House =

Historic house in Indiana, United States

- U.S. National Register of Historic Places
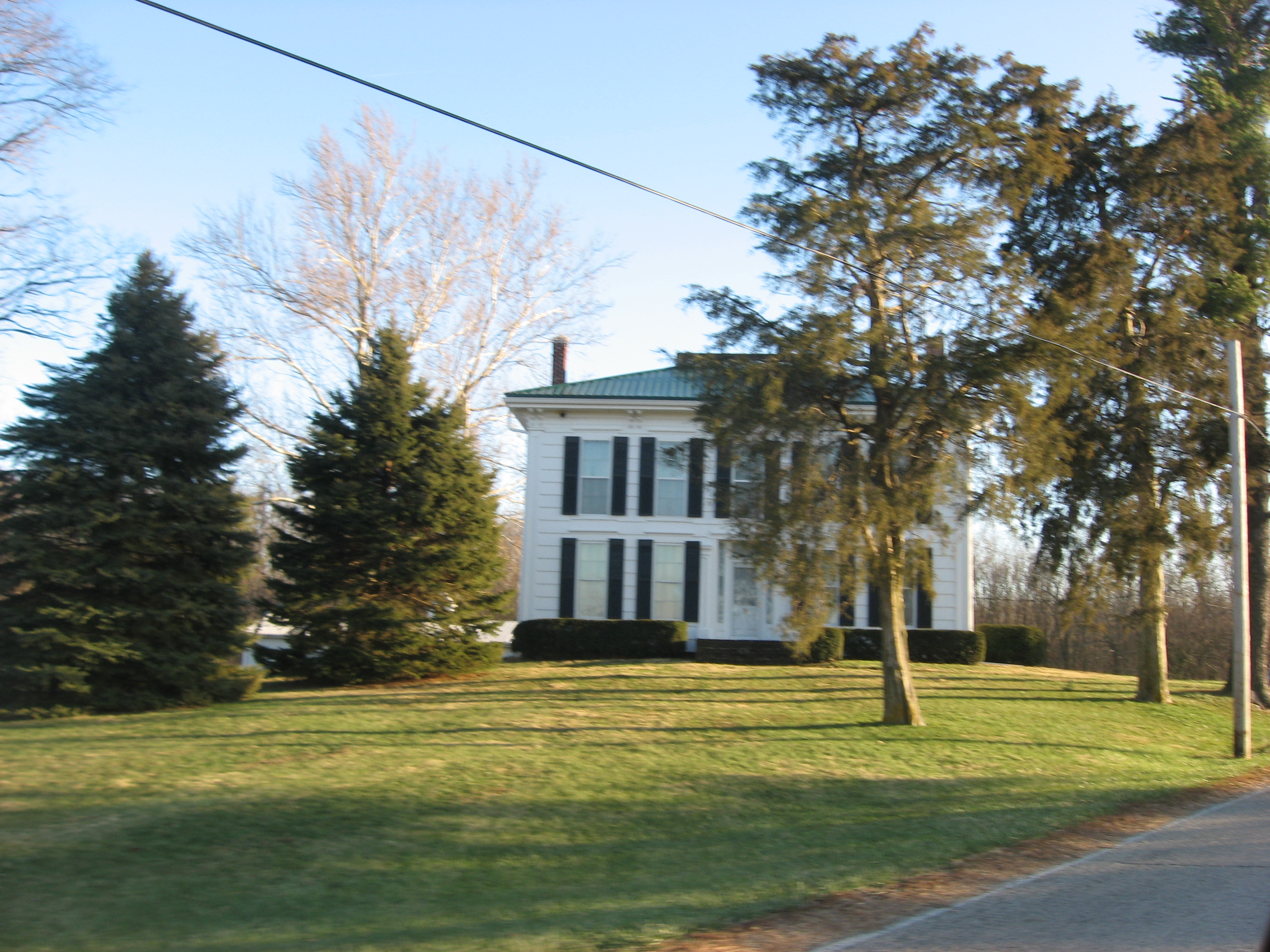
- Dr. Samuel Vaughn Jump House, January 2012

- Location within Indiana Location within the United States
- Location: County Road 462E south of New Burlington and southeast of Muncie, Perry Township, Delaware County, Indiana
- Coordinates: 40°7′13″N 85°17′50″W
- Area: 7.3 acres (3.0 ha)
- Built: 1848
- Architectural style: Greek Revival
- NRHP reference No.: 82000033
- Added to NRHP: November 12, 1982

Dr. Samuel Vaughn Jump House is a historic home located at Perry Township, Delaware County, Indiana. It was built in 1848, and is a two-story, rectangular, Greek Revival style frame dwelling. It has a low hipped roof, small porch, and one-story wing.

The house was named for its most notable resident, Dr. Samuel Vaughn Jump, the first resident physician in Delaware County. Dr. Jump attended Ohio Medical College in Cincinnati before opening his own practice in New Burlington in 1848. He was elected the first president of the Delaware-Blackford County Medical Society and served as a representative to the Medical Society of Indiana. Dr. Jump was also active in politics; he was elected to the Indiana General Assembly in 1869 and later served as Postmaster of New Burlington.

It was added to the National Register of Historic Places in 1982.
