= Medford, Indiana =

Unincorporated community in Indiana, U.S.

Medford
- Unincorporated community
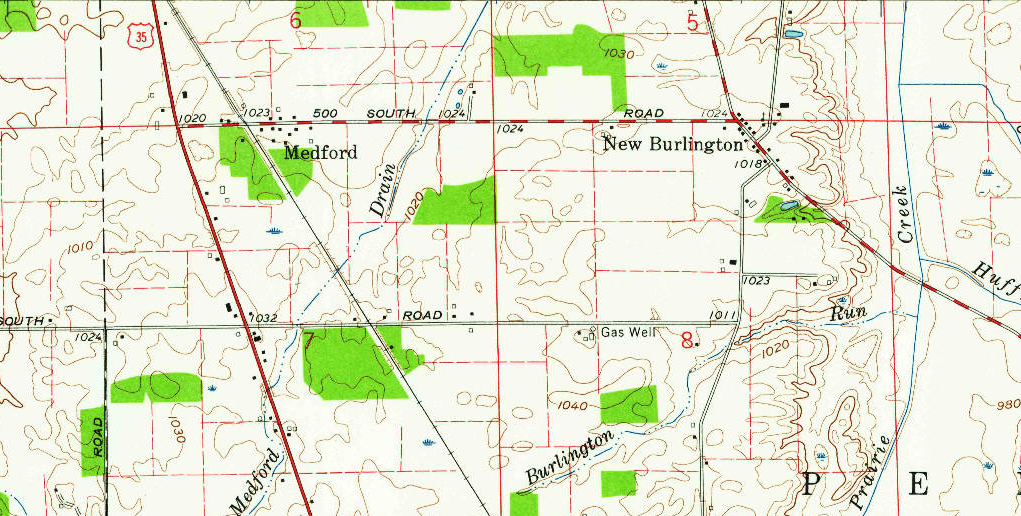
- Excerpt from 1960 USGS map showing Medford and New Burlington, Indiana.

- Location within Indiana Location within the United States
- Coordinates: 40°07′14.22″N 85°19′51.97″W
- Country: United States
- State: Indiana
- County: Delaware
- Township: Perry
- Founded by: Clarissa Phillips
- Named after: Medford, Maine
- ZIP code: 47302

Medford is an unincorporated community in Delaware County, Indiana, United States. It is located about five miles (8.0 km) to the southeast of Muncie, just east of U.S. Route 35, and about 1.2 miles west of New Burlington.

== History ==
Medford, originally named Phillips after its founder Clarissa Phillips, was platted in 1901. The Phillips post office operated from 1903 until 1908. The town's current name may have been inspired by Medford, Maine.

With the construction of the Chesapeake & Ohio Railway (C&O RR) through Perry Township, Medford became home to a telegraph office that operated around the clock, relaying dispatchers' orders to train crews. This office remained in service until the early 1950s.

The establishment of the railroad contributed to the decline of nearby New Burlington, as the small Medford station was developed about two miles west. The local post office continued under the name Phillips.

Medford is now in the 47302 ZIP Code, which has the recommended city name of Muncie. Medford is listed as a city name to avoid.

The Cardinal Greenway runs through Medford, which has a "Medford trailhead" with parking.
