= Job Garner-Jacob W. Miller House =

Historic house in Indiana, United States

- U.S. National Register of Historic Places
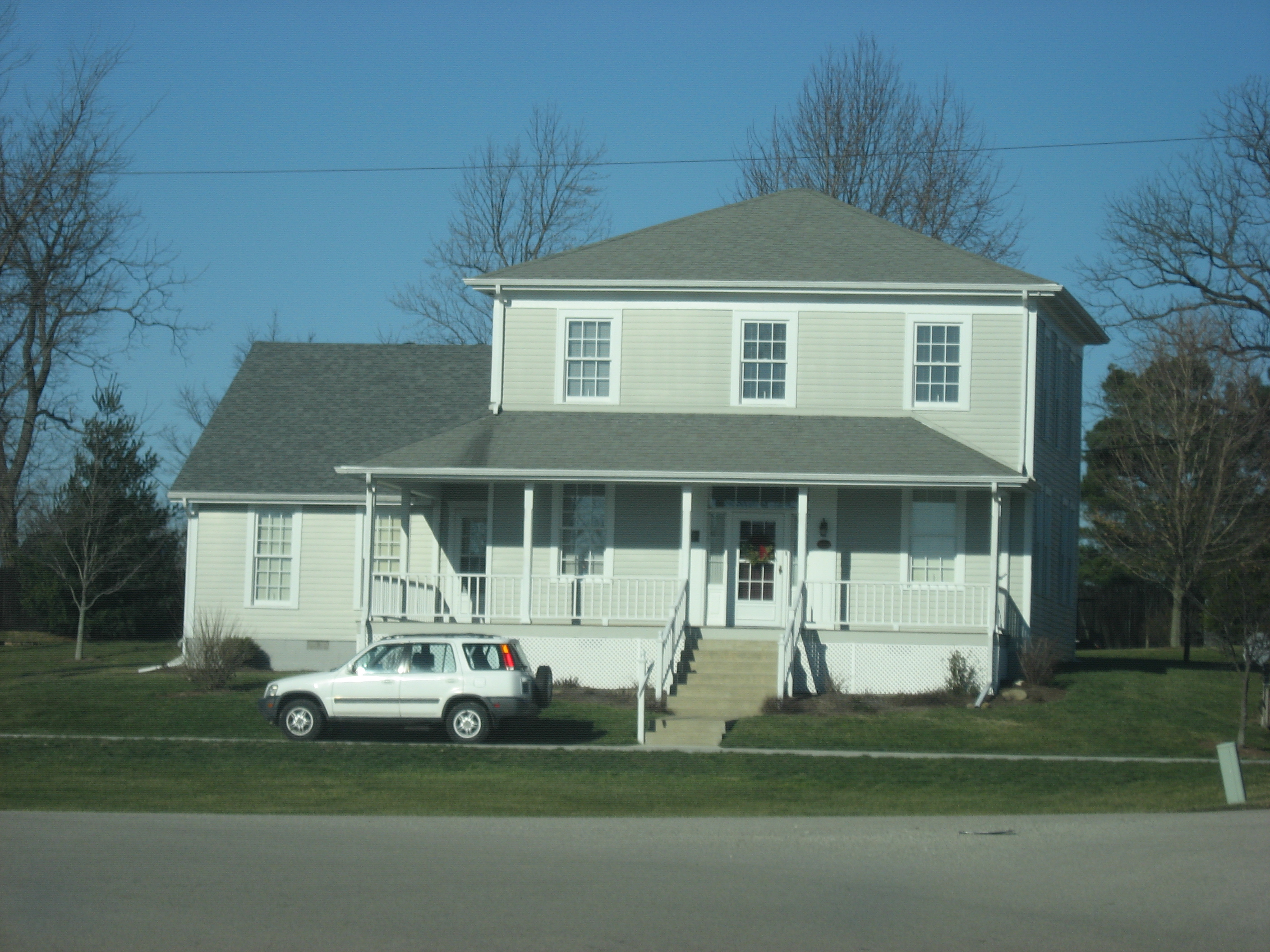
- Job Garner-Jacob W. Miller House, January 2012

- Location within Indiana Location within the United States
- Location: Bethel Pike at County Road 700W, east of Bethel, Delaware County, Indiana
- Coordinates: 40°14′54″N 85°31′11″W
- Area: 1 acre (0.40 ha)
- Built: c. 1842
- Architectural style: Greek Revival
- NRHP reference No.: 86001264
- Added to NRHP: June 13, 1986

Job Garner-Jacob W. Miller House is a historic home located at Harrison Township, Delaware County, Indiana. It was built about 1842, and is a two-story, square, Greek Revival style frame dwelling. It has a hipped roof, wraparound porch, wing and rear addition.

The house is named, in part, for Jacob W. Miller, who lived in the home for many years. A native of Stark County, Ohio, Miller was a prominent businessman in Delaware County, involved in the grocery and livestock industries. Miller joined the Wrought Iron Bridge Company of Canton, Ohio in 1868. He soon became the company's president before withdrawing from the business in 1872.

It was added to the National Register of Historic Places in 1986.
