= Martin Hofherr Farm =

- U.S. National Register of Historic Places
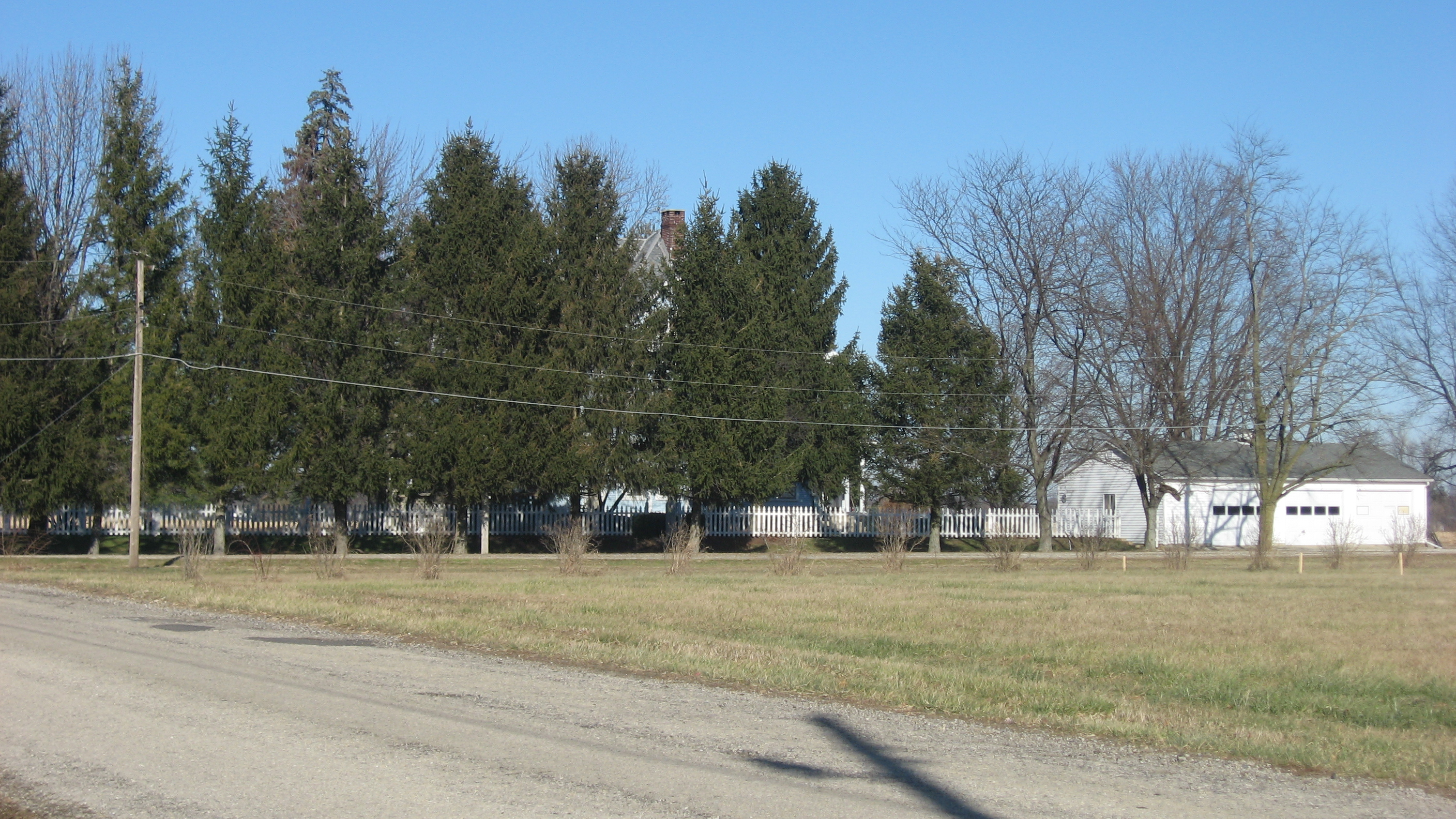
- Martin Hofherr Farm buildings, January 2012

- Location within Indiana Location within the United States
- Location: County Road 650W, north of its junction with Division Rd. and northwest of Yorktown, Mount Pleasant Township, Delaware County, Indiana
- Coordinates: 40°11′42″N 85°30′29″W
- Area: 4 acres (1.6 ha)
- Built: 1904, 1905, 1913
- Built by: Steele, Benton; et al.
- Architectural style: Queen Anne, Round barn; English barn
- NRHP reference No.: 92000677
- Added to NRHP: June 4, 1992

Martin Hofherr Farm is a historic home and farm located at Mount Pleasant Township, Delaware County, Indiana. The main house was built in 1905, and is a 2 1/2-story, Queen Anne style frame dwelling. It has a complex slate covered roof and two brick chimneys. Also on the property is an English barn (1913) and formerly a large round barn (built 1904- collapsed 2000).

It was added to the National Register of Historic Places in 1992.
