= Samuel L. Reed =

American judge and politician (1934–2025)

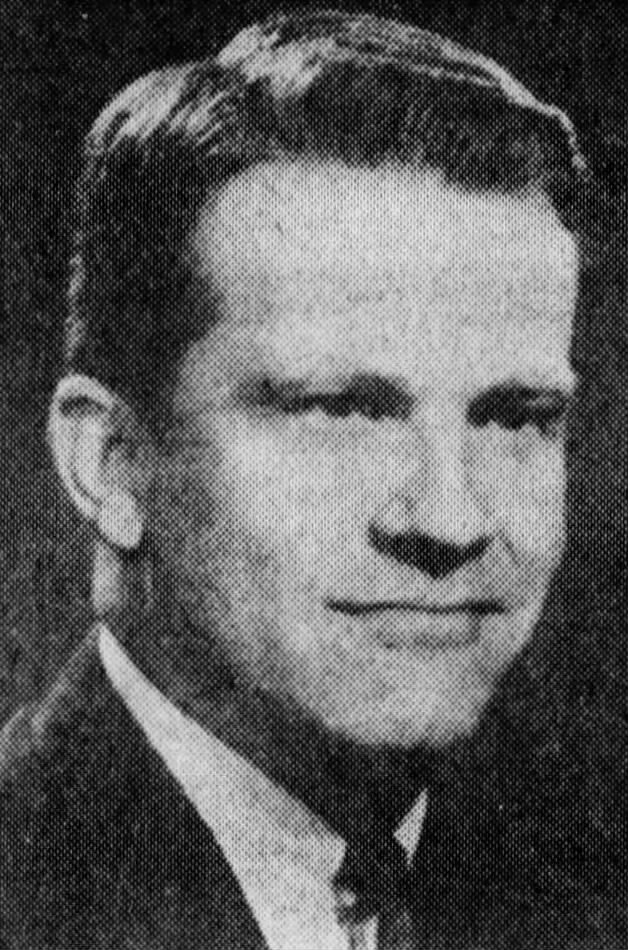
- Reed in 1972

Member of the Indiana House of Representatives from the 37th district
- In office November 8, 1972 – November 3, 1976

Magistrate Judge of the United States District Court for the Southern District of Indiana
- In office 1978–1985

Personal details
- Born: Samuel Lee Reed; July 29, 1934 Selma, Indiana, U.S.
- Died: July 20, 2025 (aged 90) Seabrook Island, South Carolina, U.S.
- Party: Republican
- Spouse: Joan Guinn
- Education: Indiana University
- Occupation: Judge

Samuel Lee Reed (July 29, 1934 – July 20, 2025) was an American judge and politician. A member of the Republican Party, he served in the Indiana House of Representatives from 1972 to 1976 and as magistrate judge of the United States District Court for the Southern District of Indiana from 1978 to 1985.

== Early life and career ==
Reed was born in Selma, Indiana, the son of Merritt Reed and Jane Williams. He attended Selma High School, graduating in 1952. After graduating, he attended Indiana University, earning his BS degree in 1956 and his JD degree in 1959, which after earning his degrees, he worked as an attorney in Indiana.

Reed served in the Indiana House of Representatives from 1972 to 1976. After his service in the House, he served as magistrate judge of the United States District Court for the Southern District of Indiana from 1978 to 1985.

== Personal life and death ==
Reed was married to Joan Guinn. Their marriage lasted until Reed's death in 2025.

Reed died in Seabrook Island, South Carolina on July 20, 2025, at the age of 90.
