= Selma, Indiana =

- Town
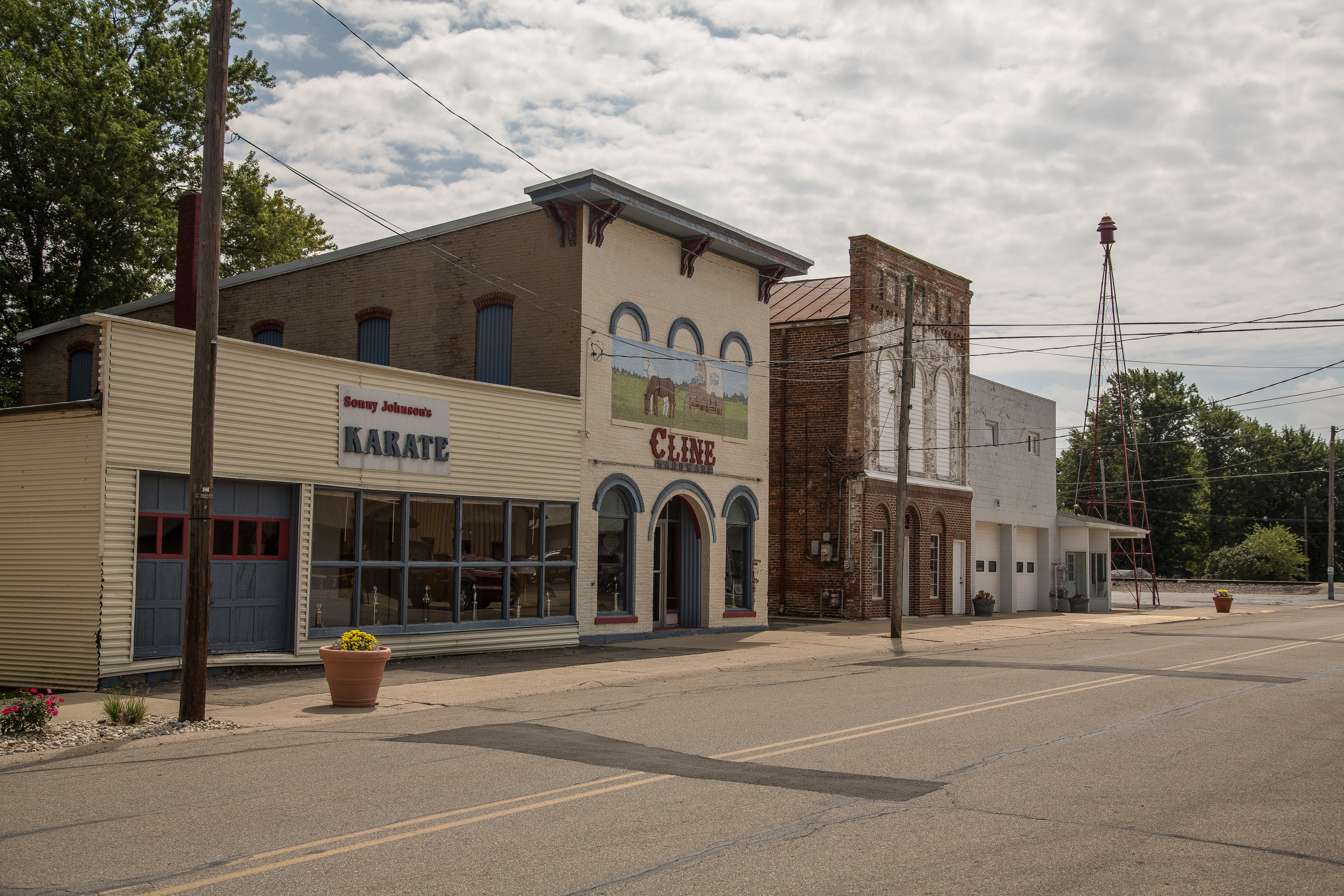
- Main street

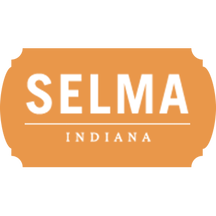
- Logo

- Location of Selma in Delaware County, Indiana.
- Coordinates: 40°11′26″N 85°16′13″W
- Country: United States
- State: Indiana
- County: Delaware
- Township: Liberty
- Founded: 1852
- Incorporated: 1907

Area
  - Total: 0.90 sq mi (2.33 km^{2})
  - Land: 0.90 sq mi (2.32 km^{2})
  - Water: 0.0039 sq mi (0.01 km^{2})
- Elevation: 1,004 ft (306 m)

Population (2020)
  - Total: 747
  - Estimate (2025): 732 ▼
  - Density: 834.4/sq mi (322.17/km^{2})
- Time zone: UTC-5 (Eastern (EST))
  - Summer (DST): UTC-4 (EDT)
- ZIP code: 47383
- Area code: 765
- FIPS code: 18-68706
- GNIS feature ID: 2397650
- Website: townofselma.com

Selma is a town in Liberty Township, Delaware County, Indiana, United States. As of the 2020 census, the town had a total population of 747. It is part of the Muncie, IN Metropolitan Statistical Area.

== History ==
Selma was platted in 1852 when the railroad was extended to that point. The Selma post office was established in 1853.

Affected by the Indiana Gas Boom, gas and oil were the primary industries of Selma in the late 19th and early 20th centuries. Selma was incorporated as a town in 1907.

On March 14, 2024, Selma was hit by a strong EF2 tornado, which mainly hit northern areas of Selma.

=== Selma High School ===
Selma High School was built 1904 and was razed in 1976. It became a middle school from 1967 to 1975.

== Geography ==
Indiana State Road 32 runs along the northern edge of the town.

According to the 2010 census, Selma has a total area of 0.912 square miles (2.36 km^{2}), of which 0.91 square miles (2.36 km^{2}) (or 99.78%) is land and 0.002 square miles (0.01 km^{2}) (or 0.22%) is water.

== Demographics ==
Historical population
Census	Pop.	Note	%±
1880	244		—
1910	350		—
1920	318		−9.1%
1930	344		8.2%
1940	424		23.3%
1950	499		17.7%
1960	562		12.6%
1970	890		58.4%
1980	1,056		18.7%
1990	800		−24.2%
2000	880		10.0%
2010	866		−1.6%
2020	747		−13.7%
2025 (est.)	732		−2.0%
U.S. Decennial Census

=== 2020 census ===
As of the census of 2020, there were 747 people, 313 households, and 91 families living in the town. The population density was 830 inhabitants per square mile (320.5/km^{2}). There were 345 housing units at an average density of 383.3 per square mile (148.0/km^{2}). The racial makeup of the town was 93.3% White, 0.5% African American, 0.4% Native American or Alaskan Native, 0.1% Asian, 0.1% Native Hawaiian or Pacific Islander, 0.2% from other races, and 5.2% from two or more races. Hispanic or Latino of any race were 1.9% of the population.

There were 313 households, of which 25.4% had children under the age of 18 living with them, 49.9% were married couples living together, 28.9% had a female householder with no husband present, 11.5% had a male householder with no wife present, and 9.7% were non-families. 40.4% of all households were made up of individuals. The average household size was 2.39 and the average family size was 3.07.

38.6% of the population had never been married. 47.1% of residents were married and not separated, 5.4% were widowed, 7.7% were divorced, and 1.2% were separated.

The median age in the town was 35.5. 4.8% of residents were under the age of 5; 25.4% of residents were under the age of 18; 74.6% were age 18 or older; and 11.7% were age 65 or older. 6.3% of the population were veterans.

The most common language spoken at home was English with 99.1% speaking it at home, 0.4% spoke Spanish at home and 0.4% spoke another Indo-European language at home. 0.4% of the population were foreign born.

The median household income in Selma was $48,036, 14.5% less than the median average for the state of Indiana. 21.6% of the population were in poverty, including 24.8% of residents under the age of 18. The poverty rate for the town was 8.7% higher than that of the state. 18.4% of the population was disabled and 9.2% had no healthcare coverage. 50.0% of the population had attained a high school or equivalent degree, 23.5% had attended college but received no degree, 6.9% had attained an Associate's degree or higher, 10.0% had attained a Bachelor's degree or higher, and 0.6% had a graduate or professional degree. 9.0% had no degree. 58.6% of Selma residents were employed, working a mean of 35.4 hours per week. The median gross rent in Selma was $611 and the homeownership rate was 65.5%. 32 housing units were vacant at a density of 35.6 per square mile (13.7/km^{2}).

=== 2010 census ===
As of the census of 2010, there were 866 people, 337 households, and 239 families living in the town. The population density was 951.6 inhabitants per square mile (367.4/km^{2}). There were 377 housing units at an average density of 414.3 per square mile (160.0/km^{2}). The racial makeup of the town was 97.2% White, 0.7% African American, 0.5% Native American, 0.2% Asian, 0.2% Pacific Islander, 0.1% from other races, and 1.0% from two or more races. Hispanic or Latino of any race were 0.9% of the population.

There were 337 households, of which 38.6% had children under the age of 18 living with them, 50.1% were married couples living together, 15.7% had a female householder with no husband present, 5.0% had a male householder with no wife present, and 29.1% were non-families. 22.8% of all households were made up of individuals, and 10.7% had someone living alone who was 65 years of age or older. The average household size was 2.55 and the average family size was 2.98.

The median age in the town was 39 years. 26% of residents were under the age of 18; 10.4% were between the ages of 18 and 24; 24.7% were from 25 to 44; 24.8% were from 45 to 64; and 14.2% were 65 years of age or older. The gender makeup of the town was 47.2% male and 52.8% female.

=== 2000 census ===
As of the census of 2000, there were 880 people, 336 households, and 250 families living in the town. The population density was 1,037.2 inhabitants per square mile (400.5/km^{2}). There were 349 housing units at an average density of 411.4 per square mile (158.8/km^{2}). The racial makeup of the town was 97.84% White, 0.57% African American, 0.34% Native American, 0.00% Asian, 0.00% Pacific Islander, 0.11% from other races, and 1.14% from two or more races. 0.34% of the population were Hispanic or Latino of any race.

There were 336 households, out of which 40.2% had children under the age of 18 living with them, 59.2% were married couples living together, 13.1% had a female householder with no husband present, and 25.3% were non-families. 22.0% of all households were made up of individuals, and 10.7% had someone living alone who was 65 years of age or older. The average household size was 2.59 and the average family size was 3.00.

In the town, the population was spread out, with 28.4% under the age of 18, 7.8% from 18 to 24, 31.7% from 25 to 44, 19.3% from 45 to 64, and 12.7% who were 65 years of age or older. The median age was 34 years. For every 100 females there were 88.8 males. For every 100 females age 18 and over, there were 86.9 males.

The median income for a household in the town was $44,423, and the median income for a family was $50,357. Males had a median income of $35,333 versus $23,625 for females. The per capita income for the town was $18,361. 4.7% of the population and 4.5% of families were below the poverty line. Out of the total population, 7.1% of those under the age of 18 and 3.8% of those 65 and older were living below the poverty line.

== Notable people ==
- Jeremy Hazelbaker, professional baseball player
- Samuel L. Reed, judge and politician
