= Reed Station, Indiana =

Reed Station
- Unincorporated community
- Location within Indiana Location within the United States
- Coordinates: 40°12′54″N 85°31′05″W
- Country: United States
- State: Indiana
- County: Delaware
- Township: Mount Pleasant
- Elevation: 925 ft (282 m)
- ZIP code: 47304
- FIPS code: 18-63594
- GNIS feature ID: 441859

Reed Station is an unincorporated community in Mount Pleasant Township, Delaware County, Indiana.

== History ==
The first post office at Reed Station was established in 1876. William Reed was postmaster.
