= Center Township, Delaware County, Indiana =

Center Township
- Township
- Location of Center Township in Delaware County
- Coordinates: 40°11′29″N 85°23′10″W
- Country: United States
- State: Indiana
- County: Delaware

Government
  - Type: Indiana township

Area
  - Total: 34.75 sq mi (90.0 km^{2})
  - Land: 34.48 sq mi (89.3 km^{2})
  - Water: 0.27 sq mi (0.70 km^{2})
- Elevation: 942 ft (287 m)

Population (2020)
  - Total: 64,549
  - Density: 1,857.53/sq mi (717.20/km^{2})
- Area code: 765
- FIPS code: 18-11296
- GNIS feature ID: 453176
- Website: www.centertownshiptrustee.com

Center Township is one of twelve townships in Delaware County, Indiana. According to the 2010 census, its population was 69,199 and it contained 31,368 housing units.

== Geography ==
According to the 2010 census, the township has a total area of 34.75 square miles (90.0 km^{2}), of which 34.48 square miles (89.3 km^{2}) (or 99.22%) is land and 0.27 square miles (0.70 km^{2}) (or 0.78%) is water. Burlington Lake and Phillips Lake are in this township.

=== Cities and towns ===
- Muncie (vast majority)

=== Unincorporated towns ===
- Andersonville
- Aultshire
- Creston
- Drew
- Irvington
- Liberty Corners
- Mayfield
- Morningside

(This list is based on USGS data and may include former settlements.)

=== Adjacent townships ===
- Hamilton Township (north)
- Delaware Township (northeast)
- Liberty Township (east)
- Perry Township (southeast)
- Monroe Township (south)
- Salem Township (southwest)
- Mount Pleasant Township (west)
- Harrison Township (northwest)

=== Major highways ===
- U.S. Route 35
- Indiana State Road 3
- Indiana State Road 32
- Indiana State Road 332

=== Cemeteries ===
- Beech Grove Cemetery, 1400 W Kilgore Ave, Muncie, IN 47305. South bank of the White River. Earliest burial 1841. Over 100 acres. As the only significant burial ground in Muncie for more than a century, Beech Grove Cemetery is a rich source of information for local historians and genealogists.
- Carmichael Cemetery, 200 E. 6th St., Muncie, IN. Earliest burial 1848. 46 Stones.
- Collins Cemetery, Intersection of Harvey and Ethel Ave., Muncie, IN. Earliest burial 1833.
- Tomlinson Cemetery, 5301 S Old State Rd 67, Muncie, IN 47302
- Elm Ridge Memorial Park, 4600 W Kilgore Ave, Muncie, IN 47304. Earliest burial 1927. Link to website.
- Parker-Moore Graveyard, East Memorial Dr., Muncie, IN. Earliest burial 1835. 139 stones.

== Demographics ==
Historical population
Census	Pop.	Note	%±
1890	12,879		—
1900	28,537		121.6%
1910	32,195		12.8%
1920	39,069		21.4%
1930	48,933		25.2%
1940	55,113		12.6%
1950	67,690		22.8%
1960	82,226		21.5%
1970	87,469		6.4%
1980	80,012		−8.5%
1990	74,656		−6.7%
2000	71,120		−4.7%
2010	69,199		−2.7%
2020	64,549		−6.7%
U.S. Decennial Census

=== 2020 census ===
As of the census of 2020, there were 64,549 people, 26,201 households, and 8,389 families living in the township. The population density was 1,857.53 inhabitants per square mile (717.2/km^{2}). There were 30,608 housing units at an average density of 880.81 per square mile (340.1/km^{2}). The racial makeup of the township was 78.1% White, 11.6% African American, 1.3% Asian, 0.3% Native American or Alaskan Native, 0.1% Native Hawaiian or Pacific Islander, 2.1% from other races, and 6.5% from two or more races. Hispanic or Latino of any race were 4.2% of the population.

There were 26,201 households, of which 16.2% had children under the age of 18 living with them, 29.6% were married couples living together, 35.5% had a female householder with no husband present, 26.1% had a male householder with no wife present, and 8.8% were non-families. 61.6% of all households were made up of individuals. The average household size was 2.46 and the average family size was 2.83.

49.6% of the population had never been married. 29.8% of residents were married and not separated, 5.6% were widowed, 13.5% were divorced, and 1.5% were separated.

The median age in the township was 28.9. 4.4% of residents were under the age of 5; 16.2% of residents were under the age of 18; 83.8% were age 18 or older; and 13.8% were age 65 or older. 5.9% of the population were veterans.

The most common language spoken at home was English with 95.7% speaking it at home, 1.7% spoke Spanish at home, 1.4% spoke and Asian or Pacific Islander language, 1.1% spoke another Indo-European language at home, and 0.1% spoke some other language. 2.5% of the population were foreign born.

The median household income in Center Township was $33,928, 39.6% lower than the median average for the state of Indiana. 30.4% of the population were in poverty, including 32.2% of residents under the age of 18. The poverty rate for the township was 17.5% higher than that of the state. 18.8% of the population were disabled and 8.9% had no healthcare coverage. 34.6% of the population had attained a high school or equivalent degree, 19.9% had attended college but received no degree, 8.9% had attained an Associate's degree or higher, 13.8% had attained a Bachelor's degree or higher, and 10.8% had a graduate or professional degree. 12.0% had no degree. 52.8% of Center Township residents were employed, working a mean of 33.9 hours per week. 4,407 housing units were vacant at a density of 126.8 per square mile (49.0/km^{2}).
