= Moonville, Indiana =

Moonsville, Indiana
- Unincorporated town
- Location within Indiana Location within the United States
- Coordinates: 40°11′38″N 85°36′05″W
- Country: United States
- State: Indiana
- County: Madison
- Township: Richland
- Elevation: 896 ft (273 m)
- ZIP code: 46012
- FIPS code: 18-50868
- GNIS feature ID: 439387

Moonsville was an unincorporated town in Richland Township, Madison County, Indiana. It was laid out in 1835 by Zimri Moon, and named for him. It flourished briefly during the abortive construction of the Indiana Central Canal, but by the end of the century it had disappeared into farmland.

== Links ==
- Madison County Cemeteries Commission
