= Mount Pleasant, Delaware County, Indiana =

Mount Pleasant
- Unincorporated community
- Location within Indiana Location within the United States
- Coordinates: 40°05′20″N 85°18′21″W
- Country: United States
- State: Indiana
- County: Delaware
- Township: Perry
- Named after: Mount Pleasant United Brethren Church
- Elevation: 1,027 ft (313 m)
- ZIP code: 47302
- FIPS code: 18-51534
- GNIS feature ID: 439640

Mount Pleasant is an unincorporated community in Perry Township, Delaware County, Indiana.

== History ==
Mount Pleasant was platted in September 1837, shortly after New Burlington, making it one of the earliest communities in Perry Township. The town was named after the nearby Mount Pleasant United Brethren Church, which was originally situated near a cemetery along County Road 396-E before it burned down. In 1893, members of the congregation founded the Pleasant Hill United Brethren Church, which remains active today.

Due to another town in Indiana already using the name "Mount Pleasant," the local post office was instead called "Hazel," named after the daughter of an early resident. Like many rural communities, Mount Pleasant lost its post office shortly after 1900. Over time, the town had various businesses, including a restaurant called "The Barn," a grocery store, and a service station, though most of these establishments no longer exist.

Mount Pleasant also had a country school, identified as No. 5, which remained in operation until the early 20th century when school consolidations began. These consolidations were driven by new educational standards and facilitated by horse-drawn busing. Another wave of school closures occurred in about the 1920s, resulting in Mount Pleasant students being bused to Center School. Later, as consolidation efforts continued, Center School and Selma High School became part of a single district, with Wapahani High School now serving the area.
