= Perry Township, Delaware County, Indiana =

Perry Township
- Township
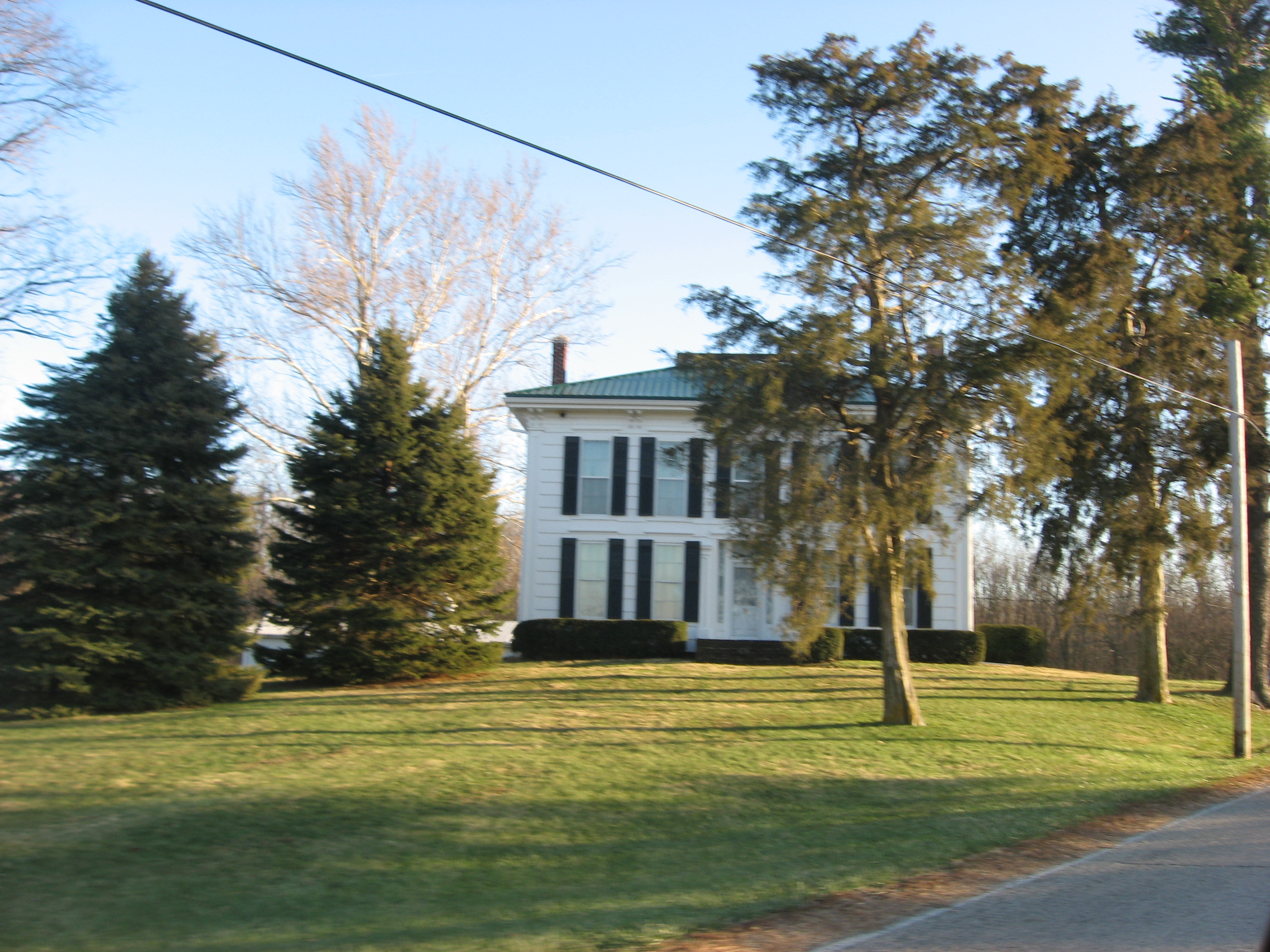
- The Samuel Jump House, a historic site in the township

- Location of Perry Township in Delaware County
- Coordinates: 40°06′52″N 85°16′36″W
- Country: United States
- State: Indiana
- County: Delaware

Government
  - Type: Indiana township

Area
  - Total: 30.16 sq mi (78.1 km^{2})
  - Land: 28.25 sq mi (73.2 km^{2})
  - Water: 1.92 sq mi (5.0 km^{2})
- Elevation: 1,030 ft (314 m)

Population (2020)
  - Total: 1,519
  - Density: 53.5/sq mi (20.7/km^{2})
- FIPS code: 18-59022
- GNIS feature ID: 453719

Perry Township is one of twelve townships in Delaware County, Indiana. According to the 2010 census, its population was 1,511 and it contained 648 housing units.

== History ==
When Cornelius Van Arsdall, James Lee, William Blunt, David and Aaron Richardson entered the township in April 1820, they had to cut a path wide enough for their wagons. After an ox was killed from the fall of a large oak, when White Beaver, Wapach and Jefferson, who probably belonged to the Delaware tribe, gained their confidence by aiding them. The township was named for Oliver Hazard Perry, a hero of the War of 1812. The Dr. Samuel Vaughn Jump House was listed on the National Register of Historic Places in 1982.

== Geography ==
According to the 2010 census, the township has a total area of 30.16 square miles (78.1 km^{2}), of which 28.25 square miles (73.2 km^{2}) (or 93.67%) is land and 1.92 square miles (5.0 km^{2}) (or 6.37%) is water.

=== Unincorporated towns ===
- Medford
- Mount Pleasant
- New Burlington

(This list is based on USGS data and may include former settlements.)

=== Adjacent townships ===
- Liberty Township (north)
- Stoney Creek Township, Randolph County (east)
- Union Township, Randolph County (east)
- Stoney Creek Township, Henry County (south)
- Prairie Township, Henry County (southwest)
- Monroe Township (west)
- Center Township (northwest)

=== Cemeteries ===
The township contains two cemeteries: Felton and Mount Pleasant.
