= Smithfield, Indiana =

Smithfield
- Unincorporated community
- Location within Indiana Location within the United States
- Coordinates: 40°10′12″N 85°16′07″W
- Country: United States
- State: Indiana
- County: Delaware
- Township: Liberty
- Elevation: 984 ft (300 m)
- ZIP code: 47383
- FIPS code: 18-70218
- GNIS feature ID: 443706

Smithfield is an unincorporated community in Liberty Township, Delaware County, Indiana.

== History ==
Smithfield was founded in 1830. A post office was established at Smithfield in 1830, and remained in operation until it was discontinued in 1856.
