= The Stockroom =

BDSM sex shop in Los Angeles, California

The Stockroom is a sex shop in Los Angeles, California, specializing in BDSM. Well-regarded for its fetish fashion products, clothes from the Stockroom have appeared in mainstream popular culture, including in the "Bad Blood" music video by Taylor Swift and a music video by Rihanna.

== History ==
The Stockroom was founded in 1988 by Joel Tucker while he was attending Occidental College. He decided to make his own kink gear, with help from his then-girlfriend who had been taking leatherworking classes, when he found that the gear he wanted to purchase was too expensive for him. They began selling online over email in 1989 and started their website in 1995. In 2001 they acquired Daedalus Publishing, followed by the Syren Latex and Stormy Leather brands in 2006 and 2007 respectively.
