= Monroe Township, Delaware County, Indiana =

Monroe Township
- Township
- Location of Monroe Township in Delaware County
- Coordinates: 40°06′50″N 85°23′16″W
- Country: United States
- State: Indiana
- County: Delaware

Government
  - Type: Indiana township

Area
  - Total: 30.31 sq mi (78.5 km^{2})
  - Land: 30.27 sq mi (78.4 km^{2})
  - Water: 0.04 sq mi (0.10 km^{2})
- Elevation: 991 ft (302 m)

Population (2010)
  - Total: 3,729
  - Density: 123.2/sq mi (47.6/km^{2})
- FIPS code: 18-50292
- GNIS feature ID: 453637

Monroe Township is one of twelve townships in Delaware County, Indiana. According to the 2010 census, its population was 3,729 and it contained 1,507 housing units.

== Geography ==
According to the 2010 census, the township has a total area of 30.31 square miles (78.5 km^{2}), of which 30.27 square miles (78.4 km^{2}) (or 99.87%) is land and 0.04 square miles (0.10 km^{2}) (or 0.13%) is water.

=== Unincorporated towns ===
- Cowan
- Oakville
- Progress

=== Adjacent townships ===
- Center Township (north)
- Liberty Township (northeast)
- Perry Township (east)
- Prairie Township, Henry County (south)
- Jefferson Township, Henry County (southwest)
- Salem Township (west)
- Mount Pleasant Township (northwest)

=== Major highways ===
- U.S. Route 35
- Indiana State Road 3
- Indiana State Road 67

=== Cemeteries ===
The township contains three cemeteries: Fairview, Macedonia and Tomlinson.
