= Oakville, Indiana =

- Unincorporated community and Census-designated place
- Location within Indiana Location within the United States
- Coordinates: 40°04′47″N 85°23′21″W
- Country: United States
- State: Indiana
- County: Delaware
- Township: Monroe
- Established: 1873
- Founded by: John Holsinger
- Elevation: 1,011 ft (308 m)
- ZIP code: 47302
- Area code: 765
- FIPS code: 18-55818
- GNIS feature ID: 2830358

Oakville is an unincorporated community in Monroe Township, Delaware County, Indiana.

== History ==
Oakville, originally known as "Pleasant Hill," was laid out by John Holsinger in December 1873. The town was renamed Oakville around 1880 to avoid confusion with Pleasant Mills in Adams County. The development of Oakville was closely tied to the arrival of the Lake Erie and Western railroad in 1872. By 1880, Oakville had a store, a post office, and a growing community centered around the railway station.

The original Pleasant Hill post office opened in 1876, the Oakville Post Office opened in 1880, and the town's first school was constructed in the early 1890s. This school, a three-room brick building, accommodated grades 1 through 8. As Oakville's population grew, the town saw the establishment of various businesses, including a grain elevator in 1898, a drainage tile operation, and the Neff Washing Machine Company. Despite the town's early growth, the grain elevator was destroyed by fire in 1912 but was rebuilt, only to face another fire in 1939. The Farmers State Bank, founded in 1915, experienced a robbery in 1921. Other notable businesses included a stockyard (closed in 1927), a Ford dealership, and a tractor supply store.

In addition to its economic development, Oakville became known for its cultural contributions. The Oakville Band, formed in 1906, performed at community events such as parades, ice cream socials, and county fairs. The band was a key part of the town's social life until its disbandment around 1911 or 1912. Loren B. Garrett, a former band member, distributed a short history of the band in 1945, recalling the band's impact on the town's communal identity.

Religiously motivated efforts to enforce strict Sunday laws also marked the early 20th century in Oakville. In one instance, local churchgoers pushed for the prosecution of individuals like Harvey West, a barber, and Rufus Williams, a grocer, for working on Sundays. Constable John D. Oaks enforced these laws, leading to fines and arrests as part of an effort to restore Sunday as a day of rest.

Despite its struggles, Oakville thrived as an agricultural community. The Farmers Elevator Co., a grain elevator established in 1919, continues to be the town's largest employer, facilitating the storage and transport of crops, particularly corn, to southeastern states. Oakville remains an unincorporated community with a population of around 200 people, maintaining its small-town charm while continuing to depend on agriculture for economic stability.

=== 1884 Tornado ===
Oakville experienced a devastating F5 tornado on April 1, 1884, which left the town nearly obliterated. Prior to the storm, Oakville was a thriving village with about 25 houses and a population of approximately 100. The storm destroyed nearly all of the town's structures, leaving only four houses standing, three of which were severely damaged. The cyclone resulted in multiple fatalities and many others sustained severe injuries.

The destruction was so extreme that much of the debris was unrecognizable. Buildings were scattered across large distances, and some household items were found in treetops or miles away from their original locations. The storm impacted businesses, such as the Replogle & Weaver sawmill and J.T. Holsinger's tile mill, and damaged public infrastructure, including a railroad warehouse. The town's total damage was estimated at $18,810, equivalent to approximately $560,000 in 2025 after adjusting for inflation.

Survival stories emerged from the wreckage, such as one of a family whose house was lifted into the air, leaving them sitting on the floor while the walls and roof were torn away. Other bizarre reports included a child being found dead half a mile from where the storm had taken them, and a chicken being dashed to pieces with its entrails scattered.

In the aftermath, immediate relief efforts were organized by local residents and a committee led by A. E. Lyman, D. V. Buchanan, and J. E. Mellette. Contributions poured in, including a $100 donation from Gen. Thomas J. Brady. The survivors faced significant challenges, as many were left homeless and without food or clothing, while efforts to rebuild were slow due to limited resources. Despite the storm's overwhelming impact, the community gradually began to recover, and Oakville remains marked by this catastrophic event in its history.

== Demographics ==
The United States Census Bureau defined Oakville as a census designated place in the 2022 American Community Survey.
