= Cross Roads, Delaware County, Indiana =

Cross Roads
- Unincorporated community
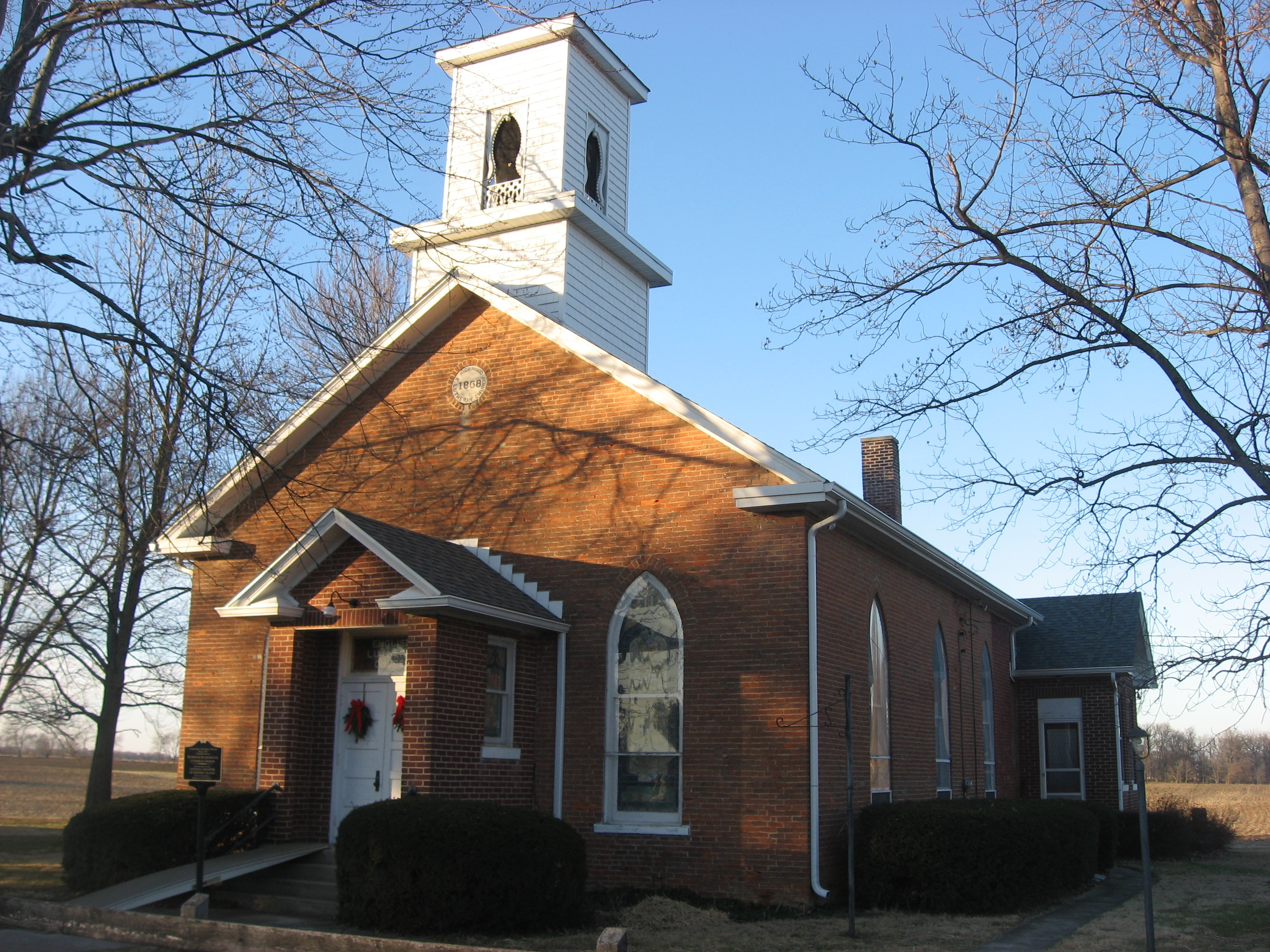
- Richwood Evangelical Lutheran Church, a historic site at Cross Roads

- Location within Indiana Location within the United States
- Coordinates: 40°05′30″N 85°29′59″W
- Country: United States
- State: Indiana
- County: Delaware
- Township: Salem
- Elevation: 974 ft (297 m)
- ZIP code: 47334
- FIPS code: 18-16050
- GNIS feature ID: 433188

Cross Roads is an unincorporated community in Salem Township, Delaware County, Indiana.

== History ==
Crossroads, one of Delaware County's oldest settlements, was established in the 1830s at the intersection of what are now County Roads 600 West and 700 South. The hamlet developed as a natural meeting point along early dirt roads connecting local settlements, including the Yorktown Road and the Muncie and Middletown Road. By the late 19th century, Crossroads had several public and commercial establishments, including Salem Township School #10 (1891–1901), a blacksmith shop, and a post office (1879–1901). Various general stores operated in the community, with the Snodgrass family running a grocery and filling station in the 1940s, and the Shroyer family later opening the Richwood House Restaurant in a historic barn.

The first store at Cross Roads opened in 1832. The community was named for the fact two roads meet at the town site.

A post office was established at Cross Roads in 1879, and remained in operation until it was discontinued in 1901.

The Crossroads Lutheran Church, originally known as Richwoods Evangelical Lutheran Church, (built in 1868) remains the focal point of the community. Though it ceased hosting an active congregation in 1999, it continues to serve as a community center under the care of the Crossroads Lutheran Church Historical Preservation Society. The church is also the site of the annual Old Fashioned Ice Cream Social, a longstanding local tradition.

Crossroads was home to the parents of U.S. Congressman George W. Cromer, who moved into the area in the 1850s. The congressman himself was raised in the small community. briefly home to a notable figure, Taylor Frakes, a handyman and clairvoyant who gained local fame in the late 19th century for his fortune-telling abilities. His cabin burned down in 1902, after which he disappeared from historical records.

In the 1940s, Crossroads was considered as the site for the proposed Tri-City Airport, intended to serve Muncie, Anderson, and New Castle. Despite initial support, the project was ultimately abandoned due to funding challenges and local opposition. Today, Crossroads remains a small, rural hamlet known for its historic charm and tight-knit community.
