= Bethel, Delaware County, Indiana =

Bethel
- Unincorporated community
- Location within Indiana Location within the United States
- Coordinates: 40°15′01″N 85°32′02″W
- Country: United States
- State: Indiana
- County: Delaware
- Township: Harrison
- Founded by: Charles Lindley
- Elevation: 896 ft (273 m)
- ZIP code: 47396
- Area code: 765
- FIPS code: 18-04996
- GNIS feature ID: 430880

Bethel is an unincorporated community in Harrison Township, Delaware County, Indiana.

== History ==
Bethel was platted in 1837 by Charles Lindley under the name "Bethlin," possibly a rural corruption of the word "Bethlehem." After the nearby ghost town of Harrison ceased to exist less than a mile to the west, Isaac Stout established a post office in Bethel, naming it after himself, "Stout" and operating it out of a store at the southwest corner of Bethel Pike and Langdon Road. One of the town's earliest landmarks was the Bethel Schoolhouse, which served as a key educational institution for local children in the mid-19th century. Initially a one-room schoolhouse, it later expanded into a two-story building, becoming a central feature of the town. The schoolhouse remained open until 1923 when it closed due to the consolidation of schools, but it remains an important historical landmark and was set for demolition in 2023. Bethel was also home to a children's singing school in the early 1900s, part of a tradition that valued the arts in the community. This tradition continued with the founding of the Old Folks Singing Society, which preserved ancient hymns through unique musical notation known as "buckwheat" notes. Though well known at the time, the society died out in the 1920s.

Between the 1880s and early 1900s, the local schoolhouse also served as a gathering place for political figures and constituents in the local Republican Party, reflecting its significance in local civic life. Bethel is also known for its tradition of pottery making. The Bethel Pike Potters continue to create pottery using techniques passed down through generations, producing functional and artistic pieces highly regarded by collectors and historians alike. The town is also notable for being home to Alexander McKinley, the second cousin of President William McKinley, adding a layer of national historical significance to the town's legacy.

Additionally, Bethel was home to a boys’ home. This institution played a role in the town's history of providing social services and support for vulnerable youth. A prominent historical structure in Bethel is the Job Garner-Jacob W. Miller House, which is listed on the National Register of Historic Places. This house stands as a key example of the architectural and cultural heritage of the town. Despite its small size, Bethel's deep involvement in education, politics, craftsmanship, and social services ensures its place as an important chapter in Delaware County's history. Its historical landmarks and cultural contributions continue to be celebrated by its residents, ensuring that the town's story is remembered for generations to come.
