= Cammack, Indiana =

Cammack
- Unincorporated community
- Location within Indiana Location within the United States
- Coordinates: 40°12′35″N 85°29′33″W
- Country: United States
- State: Indiana
- County: Delaware
- Township: Mount Pleasant
- Founded by: David Cammack
- Named after: David Cammack
- Elevation: 932 ft (284 m)
- ZIP code: 47304
- FIPS code: 18-09928
- GNIS feature ID: 432004

Cammack is an unincorporated community in Mount Pleasant Township, Delaware County, Indiana.

== History ==
Cammack was originally called "Switch A" in relation to the Erie and Western Railroad. It was renamed after David Cammack, a lumber dealer from Cambridge City. Cammack was founded in 1882 and a sawmill was constructed the same year, contributing to the town's economic growth. However, this sawmill was destroyed by fire one year later in 1883, rebuilt, and then destroyed in a fire again in 1898. A post office was established at Cammack in 1882, and remained in operation until it was discontinued in 1907.

=== Economy & Social Life ===
Railroads also contributed to Cammack's growth. The Norfolk & Western and Erie & Western Railroad lines, constructed in 1872, enhanced trade and transportation, particularly for grain and coal businesses. In the late 19th century, Cammack experienced significant industrial activity, having a lumber mill and a canning facility.

A key community landmark is the Cammack United Methodist Church, founded in 1893. The church originated from Tuesday night prayer meetings, started by a local man known as "Long Joe" Reed in 1839, who started a Sunday School that same year. As religious interest grew, a formal congregation was established, and land was donated by Betty S. Dragoo and Sam H. Dragoo to construct a church.

Cammack has long been a hub for local businesses and industry. The Reed Brothers Feed and Coal store, operated by Mike and Robert Reed, served the community until 1970. Before the feed store, the location was home to a grain elevator originally built on the site of David Cammack's sawmill. Over time, industries shifted, and by the 1970s, a fishing lure company occupied the old elevator space.

One of the most well-known establishments in Cammack is Pete's Grocery, which has been a gathering place for locals since it was built in 1931. Owned by Pete Davis since 1959, the store remains largely unchanged and maintains a nostalgic atmosphere. It serves as an informal town center, where residents gather to discuss local events and reminisce about the past. Davis was even named honorary mayor by the late Gib Fuller, a former Delaware County official.

Despite the decline of some businesses such as mills and blacksmith shops, Cammack has seen continued investment. Dick Howe, a former resident, has restored several key buildings, including the old grocery store, which he converted into a diner called Cammack Station. This diner serves sandwiches and ice cream and aims to attract more visitors to the area. Howe has also undertaken the restoration of Carpenter's Hardware and several other business buildings, working to modernize the town while preserving its historic charm. Cammack also continues to host businesses like a shoe repair shop and a salon.

=== Disasters ===
Cammack has faced multiple fires and disasters that significantly impacted its growth and development. In 1883, a fire destroyed Cammack's sawmill, believed to be incendiary, resulting in a loss of $6,000, with only $2,000 in insurance. Another fire struck the sawmill in 1898, destroying the mill and machinery, with damages again totaling $6,000. Cammack chose not to rebuild after this loss.

A major fire in 1888 destroyed part of the Cammack lumber mill, which had been instrumental in the town's economy. The fire, believed to have been sparked by smoldering ashes, threatened to destroy the entire town and caused injuries to nearby children but was eventually brought under control by the swift efforts of the community and firefighters.

In 1971, a major fire devastated the local landscaping company. The newspaper at the time called it "the worst fire in the little community's history." Residents of the nearby towns flocked to the area to witness the fire. The 1981 explosion and fire at the BIC Inc. warehouse destroyed the building and posed challenges due to a lack of municipal water supply. A fire in 2000 destroyed another warehouse, with explosions complicating firefighting efforts.

In 2024, a rare land spout caused significant damage, though no injuries were reported. The storm, initially not predicted as a threat, led to what was immediately believed to have been a tornado. The land spout caused the collapse of a local warehouse.
