= Cowan, Indiana =

- Unincorporated community and Census-designated place
- Location within Indiana Location within the United States
- Coordinates: 40°06′21″N 85°23′27″W
- Country: United States
- State: Indiana
- County: Delaware
- Township: Monroe
- Founded: 1869
- Named after: Charles McCowan
- Elevation: 991 ft (302 m)
- ZIP code: 47302
- Area code: 765
- FIPS code: 18-15526
- GNIS feature ID: 2830357

Cowan is an unincorporated community in Monroe Township, Delaware County, Indiana.

== History ==
Cowan was founded in 1869, when the railroad was extended to that point. It was named for Charles McCowan, a longtime resident who donated funds to build a church and school building.

== Overview ==
The Cowan Street Light Festival was an annual event held in Cowan to raise money to pay for the electricity used by the town's street lights, with most funds raised by selling booths to vendors. However, currently the festival no longer exists.

Public education is administered by the Cowan Community School Corporation (formerly the Monroe Community School Corporation). The elementary (K–6) was ranked 8/10. The high school (7–12) was ranked 5/10.

== Geography ==
The Norfolk Southern Railway passes from north to south through town. Cowan is located one mile north of Oakville.

== Demographics ==
The United States Census Bureau delineated Cowan as a census designated place in the 2022 American Community Survey.

== Notable people ==
- Orville Harrold, opera singer
