= Richland Township, Madison County, Indiana =

Richland Township
- Township
- Seal

- Location in Madison County
- Coordinates: 40°10′31″N 85°37′22″W
- Country: United States
- State: Indiana
- County: Madison
- Organized: March 4, 1834

Government
  - Type: Indiana township
  - Trustee: Doug Stein

Area
  - Total: 27.91 sq mi (72.3 km^{2})
  - Land: 27.7 sq mi (72 km^{2})
  - Water: 0.2 sq mi (0.52 km^{2}) 0.72%
- Elevation: 889 ft (271 m)

Population (2020)
  - Total: 5,076
  - Density: 172.4/sq mi (66.6/km^{2})
- Time zone: UTC-5 (Eastern (EST))
  - Summer (DST): UTC-4 (EDT)
- ZIP codes: 46001, 46012
- GNIS feature ID: 453796
- Website: Official website

Richland Township is one of fourteen townships in Madison County, Indiana, United States. At the 2010 census, its population was 4,775 and it contained 2,109 housing units.

== Geography ==
According to the 2010 census, the township has a total area of 27.91 square miles (72.3 km^{2}), of which 27.7 square miles (72 km^{2}) (or 99.25%) is land and 0.2 square miles (0.52 km^{2}) (or 0.72%) is water.

=== Cities, towns, villages ===
- Anderson (northeast edge)

=== Unincorporated towns ===
- Moonville at 40.193931°N 85.601364°W

== History ==
Richland was organized in 1834. It was named from their productive farmland.

== Volunteer Fire Department ==
The Richland Township Volunteer Fire Department was located on County Road 500 N, just east of Alexandria Pike on the west-central side of the township. The fire department provided fire suppression, rescue, and basic life support services to all of Richland Township and mutual aid services to surrounding areas. The fire department was staffed by approximately 35 volunteer members who are trained in fire suppression, emergency medical services, and rescue. The fire department had seven pieces of apparatus: one fire engine (Engine 48), two 3,000-gallon tankers (Engine/Tanker 40 & Tanker 44), one Medium Rescue (Rescue 49), one Grass truck (Grass 47) and two transporting BLS ambulances (Ambulances 45 and 46). Richland is also the home of the Madison County Hazardous Materials Decontamination Team (Decon 40), which has a fully equipped decon trailer, including a mass decontamination tent. The fire department responded to approximately 400-450 calls for service per year.

The Richland Township Fire Department was established in 1970.

The fire department was merged into what is now the East Madison Fire Territory.

The Richland Township Volunteer has had one line-of-duty death, in the 1980s; Donald Lindzy.

== Cemeteries ==
The township contains these six cemeteries: Funk, Heagy, Holson, Moonville, Nelson, and Wesley Chapel.

== Major highways ==
- Indiana State Road 9

== Waterways and bodies of water ==
- Killbuck Creek

Running SW through the township, enters Richland Township near County Road 500 E and County Road 700 N and exits the township near County Road 240 North and Scatterfield Road, just before emptying into the White River.

- Little Killbuck Creek

Running SSW through the township, enters Richland Township near County Road 800 N and County Road 200 E and empties into the Killbuck Creek near County Road 240 N and Scatterfield Road.

- Prosperity Lake

Located just north of County Road 500 N and just east of Alexandria Pike; situated along Little Killbuck Creek.

- Several private ponds

== School districts ==
- Anderson Community School Corporation

== Golf course ==
- Killbuck Golf Course - CLOSED

== Political districts ==
- Indiana's 5th congressional district
- State House District 35
- State House District 36
- State Senate District 26
