= National Register of Historic Places listings in Delaware County, Indiana =

Location of Delaware County in Indiana

Delaware County, Indiana, has 45 properties and districts listed on the National Register of Historic Places. Another three properties were once listed but have been removed.

Latitude and longitude coordinates are provided below for many National Register properties and districts; these locations may be seen together in a map.

Properties and districts located in incorporated areas display the name of the municipality, while properties and districts in unincorporated areas display the name of their civil township. Properties and districts split between multiple jurisdictions display the names of all jurisdictions.

This National Park Service list is complete through NPS recent listings posted May 1, 2026.

== Current listings ==
	Name on the Register	Image	Date listed	Location	City or town	Description
1	Beech Grove Cemetery	Beech Grove Cemetery	June 25, 1999 (#99000734)	1400 W. Kilgore Ave. 40°11′20″N 85°24′20″W	Muncie	
2	Boyce Block	Boyce Block	March 1, 1984 (#84001015)	216-224 E. Main St. 40°11′38″N 85°23′05″W	Muncie	
3	Otto Carmichael House	Otto Carmichael House	January 6, 2000 (#99001596)	900 W. Kilgore Ave. 40°11′32″N 85°23′46″W	Muncie	
4	Cincinnati, Richmond, & Muncie Depot	Cincinnati, Richmond, & Muncie Depot	April 14, 1997 (#97000304)	Wysor St. at the Broadway junction 40°11′51″N 85°22′45″W	Muncie	
5	City Hall	City Hall	November 14, 1988 (#88002114)	220 E. Jackson St. 40°11′34″N 85°23′04″W	Muncie	
6	Felt's Farm	Felt's Farm	August 28, 1975 (#75000015)	Race St., southeast of Eaton; 40°20′04″N 85°20′48″W	Union Township	
7	Fire Station No. 1	Fire Station No. 1	February 17, 1989 (#88002126)	421 E. Jackson St. 40°11′33″N 85°22′55″W	Muncie	
8	First Baptist Church	First Baptist Church	November 14, 1988 (#88002125)	309 E. Adams St. 40°11′30″N 85°23′02″W	Muncie	
9	Forest Park Elementary School		May 30, 2023 (#100009020)	2517 West 8th St. 40°10′54″N 85°24′57″W	Muncie	
10	Job Garner-Jacob W. Miller House	Job Garner-Jacob W. Miller House	June 13, 1986 (#86001264)	Bethel Pike at County Road 700W, east of Bethel; 40°14′54″N 85°31′11″W	Harrison Township	
11	Goldsmith C. Gilbert Historic District	Goldsmith C. Gilbert Historic District	November 14, 1988 (#88002113)	Roughly bounded by Wysor St., N. Madison St., E. Washington St., and Mulberry St. 40°11′43″N 85°22′58″W	Muncie	
12	Hamilton Township Schoolhouse No. 4	Hamilton Township Schoolhouse No. 4	December 27, 1984 (#84000487)	State Road 67, northeast of Muncie; 40°15′17″N 85°20′27″W	Hamilton Township	
13	Hathaway-Parker House		February 15, 2022 (#100007444)	1116 West Beechwood Ave. 40°11′58″N 85°23′55″W	Muncie	
14	Martin Hofherr Farm	Martin Hofherr Farm	June 4, 1992 (#92000677)	County Road 650W, north of its junction with Division Rd. and northwest of Yorktown; 40°11′41″N 85°30′32″W	Mount Pleasant Township	
15	Eli Hoover House and Confectionary	Eli Hoover House and Confectionary	November 14, 1988 (#88002128)	316 W. Main St. 40°11′38″N 85°23′21″W	Muncie	
16	Margaret and George Riley Jones House	Margaret and George Riley Jones House	September 27, 1984 (#84001017)	315 E. Charles St. 40°11′27″N 85°23′01″W	Muncie	
17	Judson Building	Judson Building	November 14, 1988 (#88002127)	300 W. Main St. 40°11′38″N 85°23′20″W	Muncie	
18	Dr. Samuel Vaughn Jump House	Dr. Samuel Vaughn Jump House	November 12, 1982 (#82000033)	County Road 462E south of New Burlington and southeast of Muncie; 40°07′03″N 85°17′53″W	Perry Township	
19	Emily Kimbrough Historic District	Emily Kimbrough Historic District	November 13, 1980 (#80000032)	Bounded by Monroe, East Washington, Hackley, and East Charles Sts.; also roughly E. Gilbert, Beacon St., E. Charles St., and Madison St. 40°11′34″N 85°22′43″W	Muncie	Second set of boundaries represents a boundary increase of June 29, 1989
20	Kirby Historic District	Kirby Historic District	September 9, 1999 (#99001110)	Roughly bounded by Jackson, Wolfe, Lincoln, and Main Sts. 40°11′34″N 85°22′12″W	Muncie	
21	Alva Kitselman House	Alva Kitselman House	September 8, 1994 (#94001105)	1400 W. University Ave. 40°11′54″N 85°24′04″W	Muncie	
22	William Henry Luick Farmhouse	William Henry Luick Farmhouse	June 10, 1994 (#94000588)	2304 Burlington Dr. 40°10′30″N 85°20′43″W	Muncie	
23	Grace Keiser Maring Library	Grace Keiser Maring Library	September 15, 2005 (#05001011)	1808 S. Madison St. 40°10′44″N 85°22′50″W	Muncie	
24	Masonic Temple	Masonic Temple	September 27, 1984 (#84001020)	520 E. Main St. 40°11′38″N 85°22′52″W	Muncie	
25	Meeks Avenue Historic District	Meeks Avenue Historic District	September 9, 1999 (#99001105)	200-331 N. Meeks Ave. 40°11′45″N 85°23′36″W	Muncie	
26	Minnetrista Boulevard Historic District	Minnetrista Boulevard Historic District	April 10, 2012 (#12000184)	400-650 Minnetrista Boulevard; 40°12′13″N 85°23′30″W	Muncie	
27	Moore-Youse-Maxon House	Moore-Youse-Maxon House	May 24, 1984 (#84001022)	122 E. Washington St. 40°11′41″N 85°23′08″W	Muncie	
28	Mount Zion Methodist Episcopal Church	Mount Zion Methodist Episcopal Church	September 17, 2008 (#08000915)	1701 W. Eaton-Wheeling Pike, west of Eaton; 40°20′57″N 85°24′27″W	Union Township	
29	Muncie Public Library	Muncie Public Library	June 17, 1976 (#76000019)	301 E. Jackson St. 40°11′33″N 85°23′02″W	Muncie	
30	Muncie Trade School		September 3, 2019 (#100004363)	1491 West Kilgore Ave. 40°11′12″N 85°24′13″W	Muncie	
31	Old West End Historic District	Old West End Historic District	September 22, 1986 (#86002721)	Roughly bounded by the White River and Washington St., Liberty St., Howard St., Orchard Pl., and Kilgore Ave. 40°11′31″N 85°23′35″W	Muncie	
32	Peacock Apartments	Peacock Apartments	November 14, 1988 (#88002119)	414 S. Jefferson St. 40°11′27″N 85°23′03″W	Muncie	
33	Richwood Evangelical Lutheran Church	Richwood Evangelical Lutheran Church	December 6, 2004 (#04001314)	9700 W. County Road 700S, northeast of Middletown; 40°05′31″N 85°30′00″W	Salem Township	
34	Riverside Historic District	Riverside Historic District	June 25, 1999 (#99000733)	Roughly bounded by University Ave. and Dicks, Gilbert, and Light Sts. 40°11′47″N 85°24′04″W	Muncie	
35	Roberts Hotel	Roberts Hotel	July 15, 1982 (#82000034)	420 S. High St. 40°11′26″N 85°23′15″W	Muncie	
36	Francis T. Roots Building	Francis T. Roots Building	March 21, 1985 (#85000605)	115-119 E. Charles St. 40°11′27″N 85°23′09″W	Muncie	
37	F.D. Rose Building	F.D. Rose Building	March 1, 1984 (#84001023)	121 E. Charles St. 40°11′27″N 85°23′08″W	Muncie	
38	Shaffer Chapel A. M. E. Church		March 3, 2025 (#100011477)	1501 East Highland Avenue; 40°12′13″N 85°22′13″W	Muncie	
39	W.W. Shirk Building	W.W. Shirk Building	November 14, 1988 (#88002116)	219 E. Jackson St. 40°11′33″N 85°23′04″W	Muncie	
40	Walnut Street Historic District	Walnut Street Historic District	February 17, 1989 (#88002112)	Roughly Walnut St. from Washington to Victor Sts. 40°11′31″N 85°23′11″W	Muncie	
41	West Washington Street Bridge	West Washington Street Bridge	March 19, 2008 (#08000187)	W. Washington St. over the west fork of the White River; 40°11′42″N 85°23′29″W	Muncie	
42	Westwood Historic District	Westwood Historic District	April 3, 1992 (#92000186)	Roughly bounded by Briar, Petty, and Warwick Rd. and Riverside Ave. 40°12′09″N 85°24′44″W	Muncie	
43	Wilson Junior High School	Wilson Junior High School	September 16, 2001 (#01000992)	2000 S. Franklin St. 40°10′36″N 85°23′20″W	Muncie	
44	Wysor Heights Historic District	Wysor Heights Historic District	November 1, 1988 (#88001217)	Roughly bounded by Highland Ave., the White River, N. Elm St. and N. Walnut St. 40°12′18″N 85°23′01″W	Muncie	
45	YWCA	YWCA	February 17, 1989 (#88002117)	310 E. Charles St. 40°11′28″N 85°23′02″W	Muncie	

== Former listings ==
	Name on the Register	Image	Date listed	Date removed	Location	City or town	Description
1	Goddard Warehouse	Goddard Warehouse	November 14, 1988 (#88002121)	July 7, 1993	215 W. Seymour St. 40°11′22″N 85°23′17″W	Muncie	Demolished in 1993
2	J.C. Johnson House	J.C. Johnson House	July 15, 1982 (#82000032)	September 11, 2018	322 E. Washington St. 40°11′41″N 85°23′00″W	Muncie	Destroyed by fire in 2007
3	John Valentine House	John Valentine House	January 4, 1983 (#83000026)	March 22, 2014	1101 Riverside Ave. 40°12′00″N 85°23′54″W	Muncie	Destroyed by fire in 1994

== See also ==
- List of National Historic Landmarks in Indiana
- National Register of Historic Places listings in Indiana
- Listings in neighboring counties: Blackford, Grant, Henry, Jay, Madison, Randolph
- List of Indiana state historical markers in Delaware County
