= Kimbrough =

Kimbrough is both a surname and a given name. Notable people with the name include:

Surname:

- Charles Kimbrough (1936–2023), American actor
- Clint Kimbrough (1933–1996), American actor
- Elbert Kimbrough (born 1938), American football player
- Emily Kimbrough (1899–1989), American author and journalist
- Frank Kimbrough (1956–2020), American jazz pianist
- Frank Kimbrough (American football) (1904–1971), American football player
- John Kimbrough (1918–2006), American athlete and politician
- Junior Kimbrough (1930–1998), American blues musician
- Lottie Kimbrough (1900–unknown), American country blues singer
- Mary Craig Sinclair (1882–1961), née Kimbrough, writer, wife of Upton Sinclair
- Shane Kimbrough (born 1967), American astronaut
- Seth Kimbrough (born 1982), American musician and BMX rider
- Shatori Walker-Kimbrough (born 1995), American basketball player
- Stan Kimbrough (born 1966), American basketball player
- Tony Kimbrough (born 1964), American football player
- Will Kimbrough (born 1964), American singer-songwriter and musician

Given name:

- James Kimbrough Jones (1839–1908), United States Senator
- Duke Kimbrough McCall (1914–2013), American religious leader
- Kimbrough Stone (1875–1958), United States federal judge

== See also ==
- Kimbrough, Alabama, unincorporated community in Alabama, United States
- Emily Kimbrough Historic District, in Muncie, Indiana
- Kimbrough Memorial Stadium, at West Texas A&M University
- Tom Kimbrough Stadium, in Murphy, Texas, USA
- William Kimbrough Pendleton House, in Eustis, Florida
- Kimbrough v. United States, a United States Supreme Court case about criminal sentencing
- Kimbra
- Kimbro (disambiguation)
