= Kimbro =

Kimbro may refer to:

- Kimbro (surname)
- Kimbro, Texas, small unincorporated community in northeast Travis County, Texas, United States
- Hayle Kimbro Pool, wetland on The Lizard, Cornwall
- USNS Sgt. Truman Kimbro (T-AK-254), Boulder Victory-class cargo ship built for the U.S. Maritime Commission in World War II

== See also ==
- Kimbra (born 1990), New Zealand singer and actress
- Kimbrough
