= Rose Building =

Rose Building may refer to:

in the United States (by state):

- Rose Building (Fairbanks, Alaska), listed on the National Register of Historic Places (NRHP)
- Rose Building (Little Rock, Arkansas), NRHP-listed
- F. D. Rose Building, Muncie, Indiana, NRHP-listed in Delaware County
- Adolph Rose Building, Vicksburg, Mississippi, NRHP-listed in Warren County
- Rose Realty-Securities Building, Omaha, Nebraska, NRHP-listed
- Rose Building (Cleveland, Ohio)
- Visitors Information Center (Portland, Oregon), or the Rose Building
