= West Washington Street Bridge =

West Washington Street Bridge may refer to:

- West Washington Street Bridge (Springfield, Illinois), listed on the National Register of Historic Places in Sangamon County, Illinois
- West Washington Street Bridge (Muncie, Indiana), listed on the National Register of Historic Places in Delaware County, Indiana
