= Hotel Roberts =

Hotel Roberts may refer to:

- Hotel Roberts (Pratt, Kansas), listed on the National Register of Historic Places (NRHP)
- Hotel Roberts (Provo, Utah), a former hotel, previously listed on the NRHP

== See also ==
- Roberts Hotel, Muncie, Indiana, listed on the NRHP
