= List of Indiana state historical markers in Delaware County =

Location of Delaware County in Indiana

This is a list of the Indiana state historical markers in Delaware County.

This is intended to be a complete list of the official state historical markers placed in Delaware County, Indiana, United States by the Indiana Historical Bureau. The locations of the historical markers and their latitude and longitude coordinates are included below when available, along with their names, years of placement, and topics as recorded by the Historical Bureau. There are 7 historical markers located in Delaware County.

== Historical markers ==
Marker title	Image	Year placed	Location	Topics
First Indiana Gas Well		1981	Norsemen Park in front of the town hall at 600 E. Harris Street in Eaton; 40°20′32″N 85°20′57″W	Business, Industry, and Labor, Nature and Natural Disasters
Shaffer Chapel African Methodist Episcopal Church		1996	1501 E. Highland Avenue and Wolf Street, 3 blocks east of McCullough Park, in Muncie; 40°12′12.6″N 85°22′13.4″W	African American, Religion
Slickville Tile Works		1996	Near the Delaware/Madison county line, about 1.2 miles northwest of exit 145 from Interstate 69 via U.S. Route 35/State Road 28, west to County Line Road, then north to County Road 650N, then 100 yards east to the vicinity of a farm, west of Gaston; 40°17′4.2″N 85°34′30″W	Business, Industry, and Labor, Agriculture
Ball Brothers Glass Manufacturing Company		2008	1401 E. Memorial Drive, near a white brick batch tower, in Muncie; 40°10′41″N 85°22′16″W	Business, Industry, and Labor
Hemingray Glass Company		2011	1610 and 1620 S. Macedonia Ave., Muncie; 40°10′49″N 85°22′02″W	Business, Industry, and Labor
Ball State University		2020	Near 2000 W. University Ave., Muncie; 40°11′52″N 85°24′32″W	
James Grover McDonald		2022	Albany Community Library, 105 Broadway St., Albany; 40°17′58″N 85°14′22″W	Political, Religion, Immigration

== See also ==
- List of Indiana state historical markers
- National Register of Historic Places listings in Delaware County, Indiana
