= Masonic Temple (Muncie, Indiana) =

- U.S. National Register of Historic Places
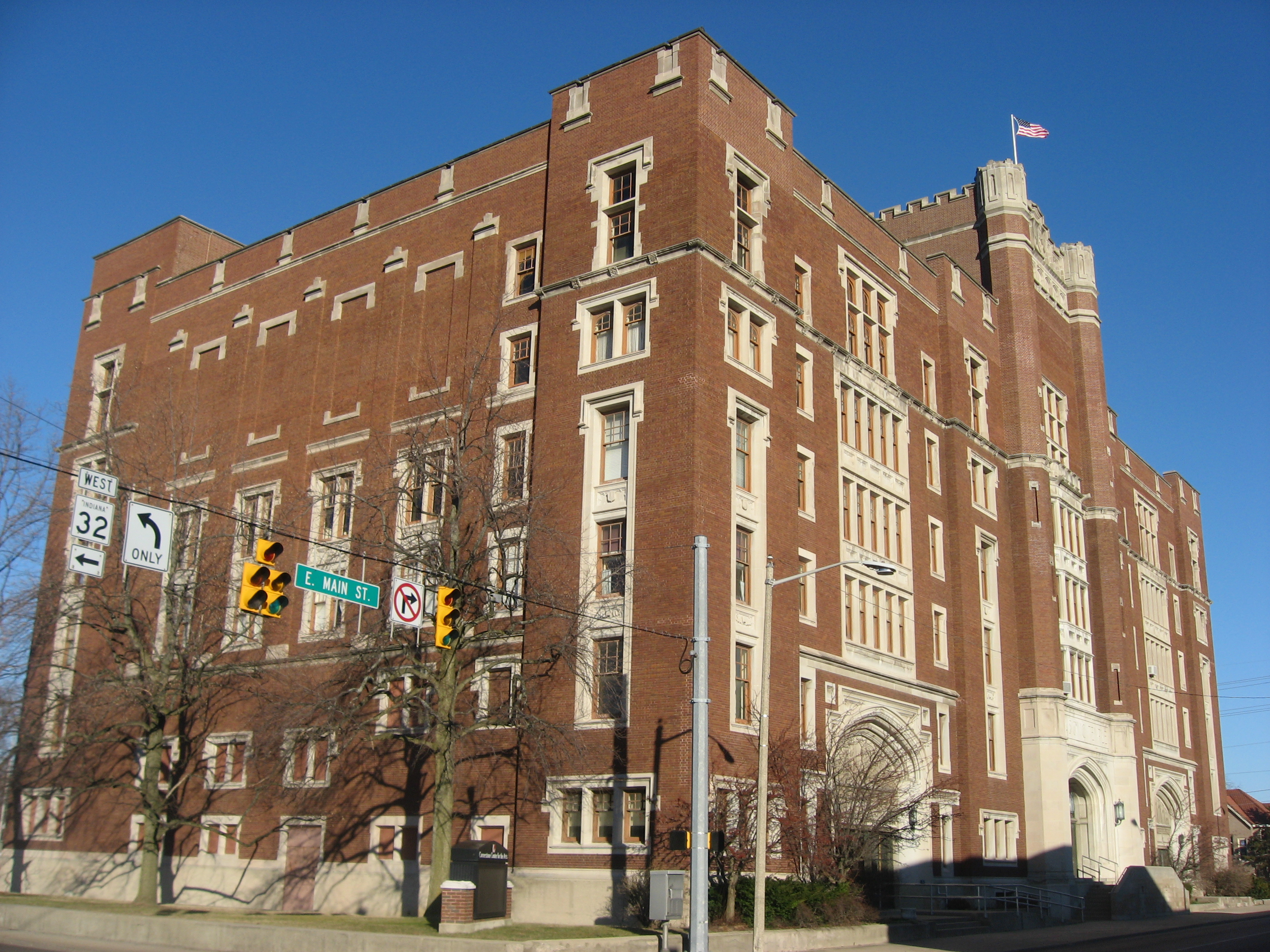
- Front and side of the temple

- Location within Indiana Location within the United States
- Location: 520 E. Main St., Muncie, Indiana
- Coordinates: 40°11′38″N 85°22′52″W
- Area: less than one acre
- Built: 1920
- Architect: Kibele & Garrard; Multiple
- Architectural style: Late Gothic Revival
- NRHP reference No.: 84001020
- Added to NRHP: September 27, 1984

Muncie's Masonic Temple is a historic fraternal lodge building located in Muncie, Indiana. The building is now only used by the Cornerstone Center for the Arts. The Muncie Masonic Temple is in the Gothic Revival style, and was designed and built during the height of the City Beautiful Movement.

== History ==
This six-story Masonic Temple is the third meeting hall constructed by the Freemasons in the city of Muncie, and well-known Muncie architect Cuno Kibele was commissioned for the project. The land was acquired by the Masons to accommodate a new building that would handle the rapid increase in membership during the period known as the Golden Age of Fraternalism. The cornerstone was laid according to Masonic tradition on 30 October 1920, and construction was completed in 1926 at a final cost of around $1 million.

== Construction ==
The first rough estimates for the construction were around $250,000. Each organization within the fraternity was to have its own assembly room. Plans were changed, however, when the Ball brothers offered up a $150,000 donation in order to add an auditorium to the structure. Frank C. Ball, in particular, stated that his hope was to provide a place for high-level entertainments to be held in Muncie and that he saw the construction of the new Masonic temple as a perfect place.

"Several years ago when our brothers Will and Ed were with us we talked several times of providing an auditorium for the benefit of the citizens of Muncie, where recitals, lectures, concerts, and entertainments of various kinds, of a high order, could be given. The control and management of such an auditorium was a difficult one to decide, and it was not decided until the time when the Masonic Order was planning to build a new temple. Ed, who was deeply interested in Masonry (he being Thirty-third Degree Mason), suggested that we build an auditorium in connection with the temple and place it under control of the Masonic Order."

The six stories are divided into three main levels, each with a corresponding mezzanine above it. The first level originally contained a banquet hall and 1,600-seat auditorium, which were intended for use by the community. The second and third levels featured ceremonial meeting rooms reserved for Masonic lodges and appendant organizations that included the York Rite (Royal Arch, Cryptic Masons, and the Masonic Order of the Knights Templar), Order of the Eastern Star, DeMolay for boys, and Job's Daughters for girls. A large assembly hall on the third floor was designed so that the marching drill teams of the Knights Templar could practice their maneuvers indoors during inclement weather.

== Artwork ==
German-born mural artist Gustave A. Brand (1862–1944) was commissioned to create twenty-two giant paintings for the two Masonic lodge meeting rooms of the Muncie Temple. These huge 12' x 14' paintings depict scenes from both the Old and New Testaments of the Bible, and several feature King Solomon and Solomon's Temple in Jerusalem. The scenes were painted on canvas and are permanently affixed to the walls on all four sides of the lodge rooms.

Brand came to prominence as an artist in America in 1887 after assisting his former art teacher, the French artist Paul Philippoteaux, in painting a massive panoramic cyclorama of the Battle of Gettysburg that was made a permanent tourist attraction in Chicago in 1890. When the German government agreed to sponsor a pavilion at Chicago's 1893 World's Columbian Exposition, Brand was hired to paint its several impressive murals depicting German industry, art, and culture. After the end of the fair, he remained in Chicago for the rest of his life and created hundreds of paintings and murals for schools, churches and other public buildings. The Muncie Masonic Temple was one of several Masonic buildings Brand created original paintings for. He generally signed his paintings with only his first name, Gustave, followed by three dots in a triangular pattern, a symbol known by Freemasons to indicate he was a Master Mason.

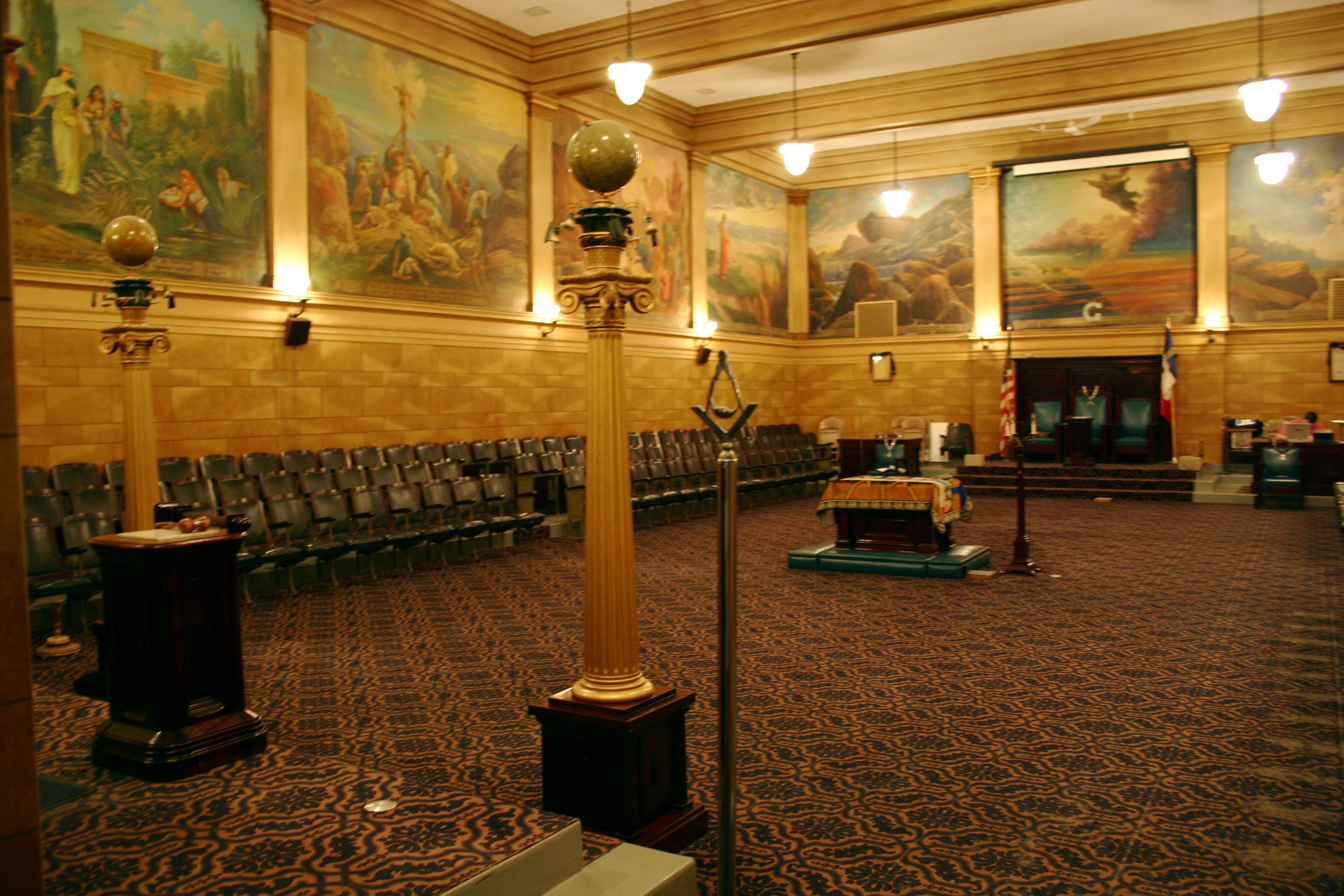
Former meeting room of Delaware Lodge 46 in the Muncie Masonic Temple, one of two lodge rooms on the top floor. Each room features 11 unique murals painted by artist Gustave Brand (c. 1922), depicting scenes from the Old and New Testaments of the Bible. The murals remain today.

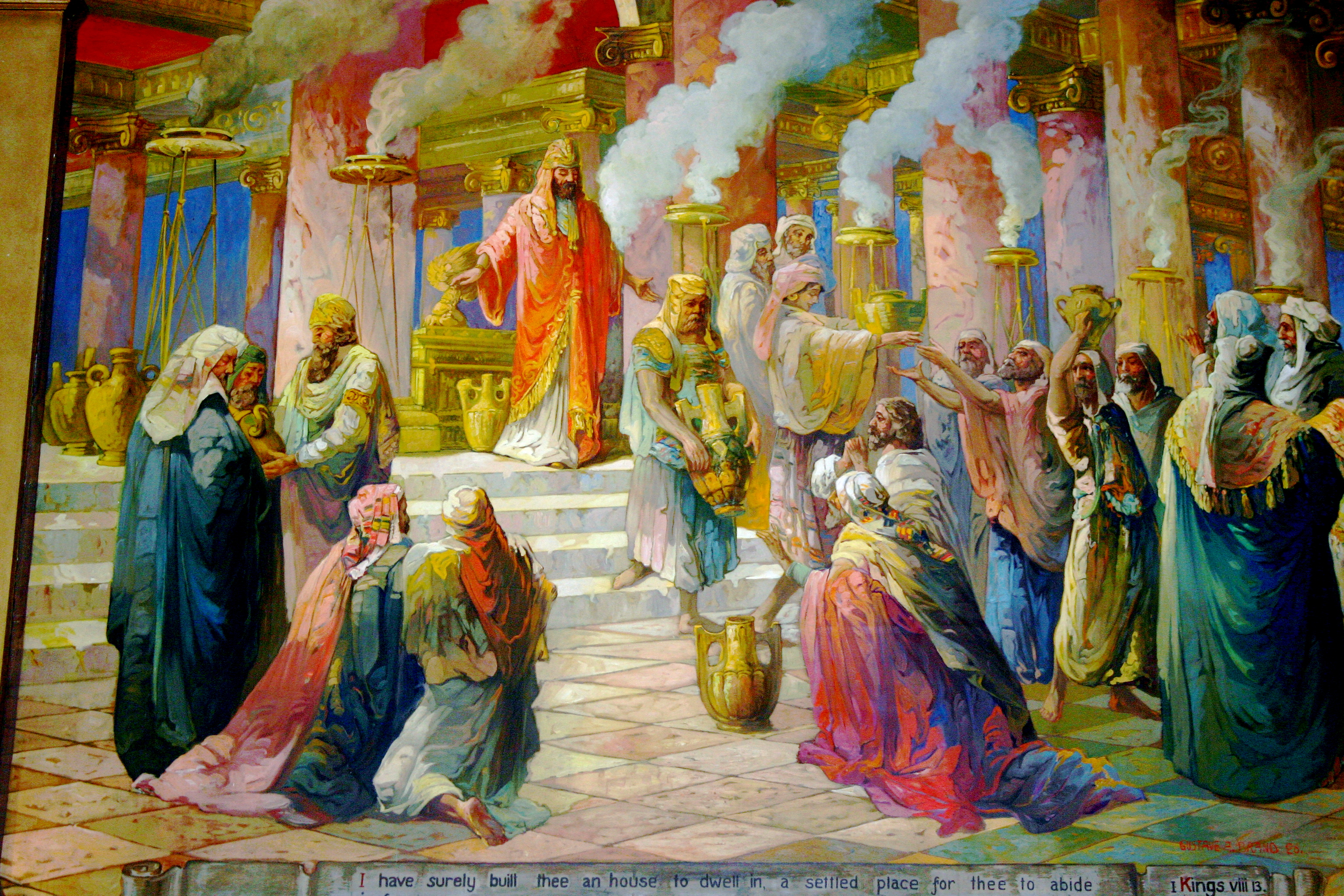
One of 22 biblically inspired murals by German muralist Gustave Brand, commissioned especially for the Muncie Masonic Temple

== Historical significance ==
The construction of the Muncie Masonic Temple was considered a major event for a number of different reasons. For one, the building was widely considered to be a crowning achievement in the city of Muncie. This was due to its architectural styling. While simple, it was still considered to be one of the most beautiful and highly recognizable landmarks in the city upon completion. Second, there was also a large draw in terms of the mystery and intrigue that surrounded the fraternal order of the Freemasons. More specifically, the people's interest in the building's cornerstone garnered much attention. The addition of the auditorium to its original plans also gave the city of Muncie one of its first major entertainment venues.

While the architecture of the building was not especially unusual for its period, the addition of the Gustave Brand murals in the Temple's two lodge meeting rooms was quite unique, especially since the Biblical scenes depicted in the colossal paintings weren't all specifically related to the biblical passages that were the basis of Masonic rituals. It remains the only Masonic temple in Indiana originally decorated in this manner, and few American Masonic halls anywhere in the country had this type of permanent custom artwork on such a grand scale.

It was listed on the National Register of Historic Places in 1984.

== See also ==
- List of Masonic buildings in Indiana
- National Register of Historic Places listings in Delaware County, Indiana
