= Moore–Youse–Maxon House =

Historic house in Indiana, United States

- U.S. National Register of Historic Places
- U.S. Historic district – Contributing property
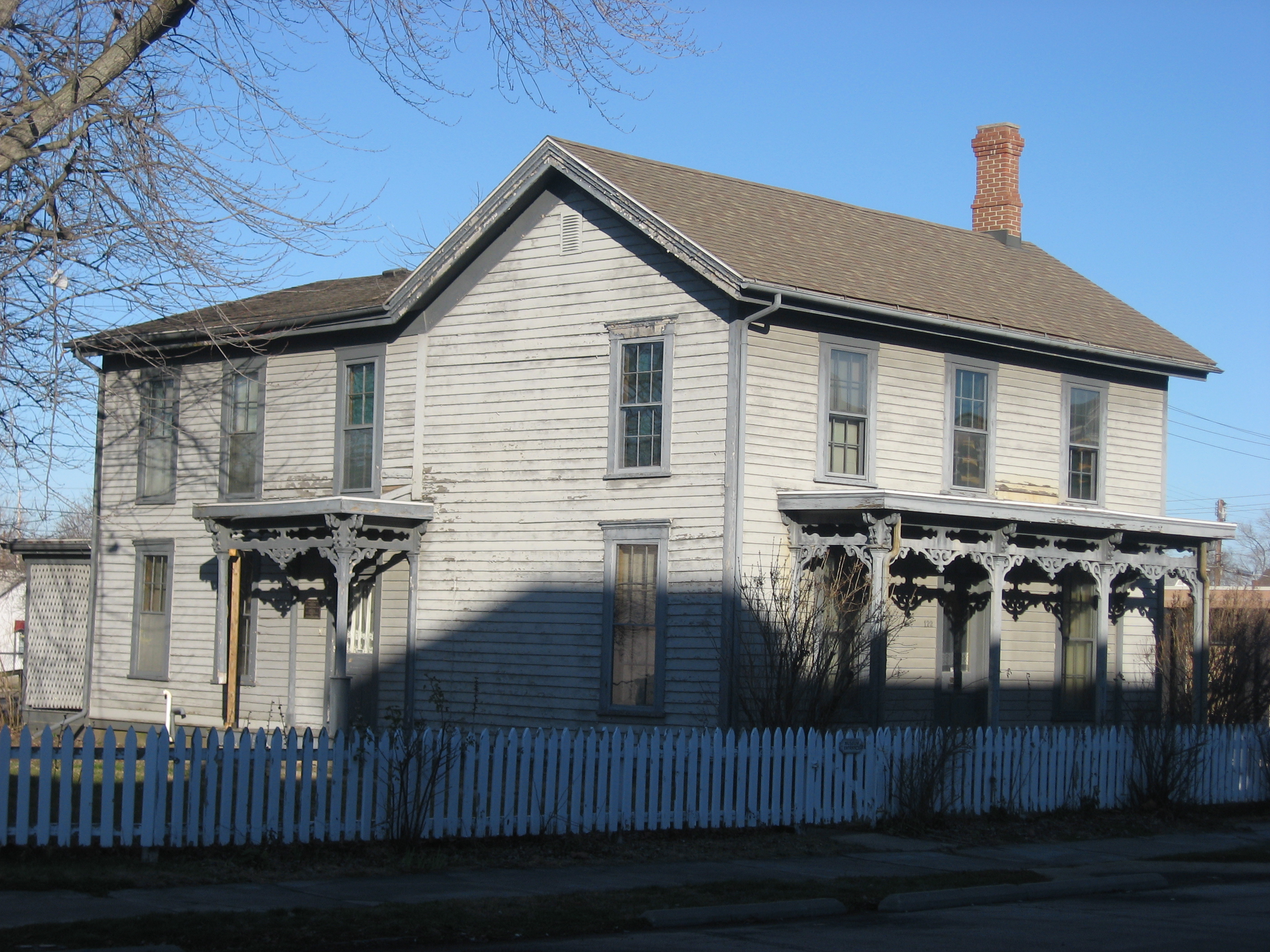
- Moore–Youse–Maxon House, January 2012

- Location within Indiana Location within the United States
- Location: 122 E. Washington St., Muncie, Indiana
- Coordinates: 40°11′41″N 85°23′7″W
- Area: 0.3 acres (0.12 ha)
- Built: c. 1860
- Architectural style: Greek Revival
- NRHP reference No.: 84001022
- Added to NRHP: May 24, 1984

The Moore–Youse–Maxon House, also known as the Moore–Youse Home Museum, is a historic home located at Muncie, Indiana. It was built about 1860, and is a two-story, three-bay, vernacular Greek Revival style frame dwelling. It features a rebuilt front porch with sawnwork and brackets. It has a two-story rear addition. The house remained in the same family from 1864 to 1982. The building is operated by the Delaware County Historical Society as a historic house museum.

The home was built on land belonging to Daniel Andrews and Mary Jane Andrews (daughter of Goldsmith C. Gilbert, a prominent resident in Muncie's early history). In 1864, the home was purchased by Charles Moore (a lawyer) and Clara Moore. Clara's daughter, Mary Youse, inherited the home, and lived there with her husband, John Maxon (a local industrialist). Mary remained in the home until her death in 1982.

It was added to the National Register of Historic Places in 1984. It is located in the Walnut Street Historic District.
