= Kirby Historic District =

Historic district in Indiana, United States

- U.S. National Register of Historic Places
- U.S. Historic district
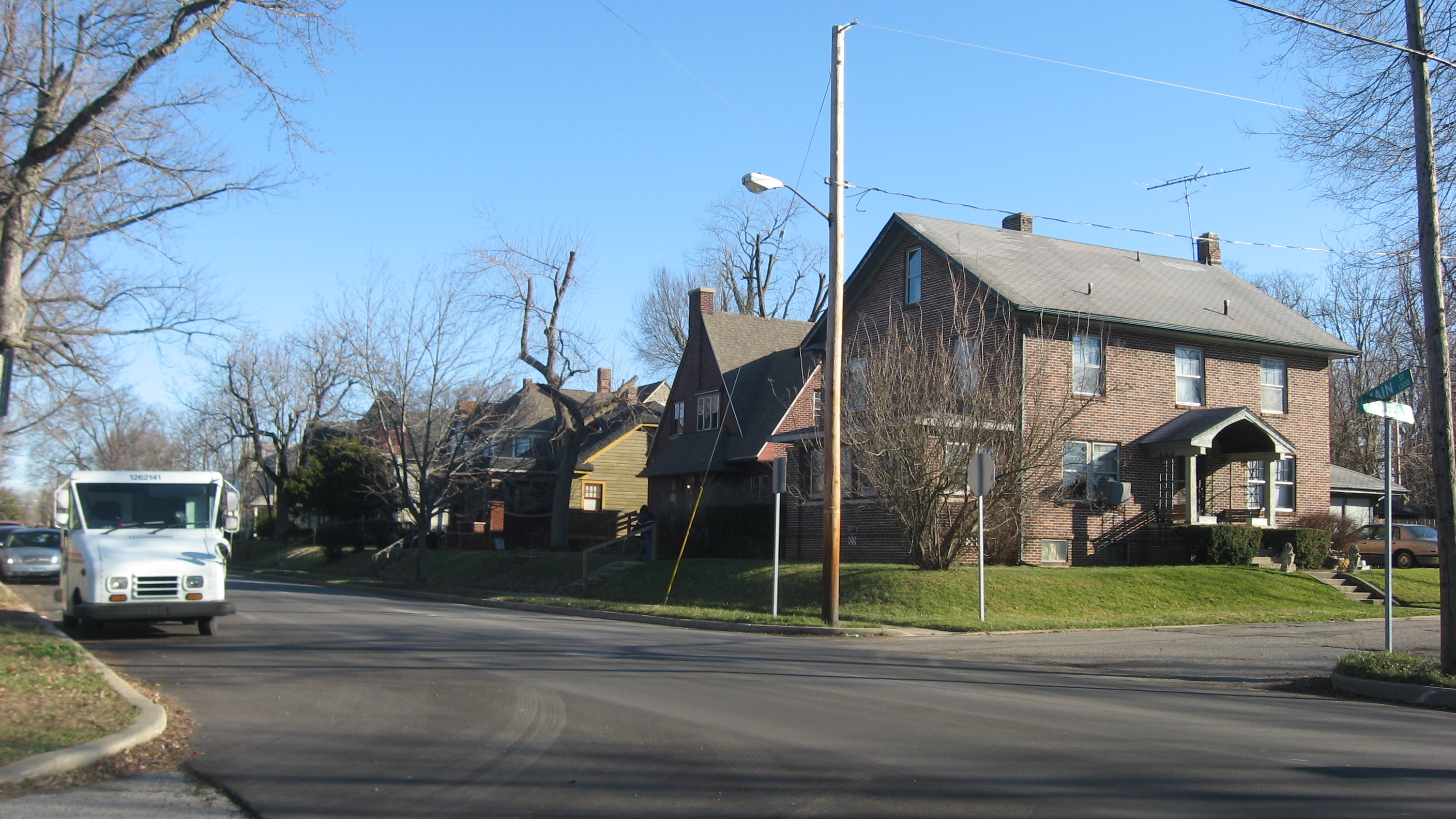
- Main and Wolfe, January 2012

- Location within Indiana Location within the United States
- Location: Roughly bounded by Jackson, Wolfe, Lincoln, and Main Sts., Muncie, Indiana
- Coordinates: 40°11′34″N 85°22′12″W
- Area: 10.5 acres (4.2 ha)
- Built: 1839
- Architect: Kibele, Cuno
- Architectural style: Greek Revival, Colonial Revival
- NRHP reference No.: 99001110
- Added to NRHP: September 9, 1999

Kirby Historic District is an American national historic district located at Muncie, Indiana. It encompasses 25 contributing buildings in a predominantly residential section of Muncie. The district developed between about 1839 and 1930, and includes notable examples of Greek Revival and Colonial Revival style architecture. Notable buildings include the Thomas Kirby House (1839), William F. Spencer House (1909), John Fitzgibbons House (1918), Theopharia A. Hough House (1909), Pearl Hopkins House (1893), and Edward R. Templar House (1905). This are said to be oldest homes in the district.

It was added to the National Register of Historic Places in 1999.

HISTORY

The district is named for the Kirby family, with Thomas Kirby being one of the founding fathers of Muncie, Indiana.
