= J.C. Johnson House =

Historic house in Indiana, United States

- J. C. Johnson House
- Formerly listed on the U.S. National Register of Historic Places
- U.S. Historic district – Contributing property
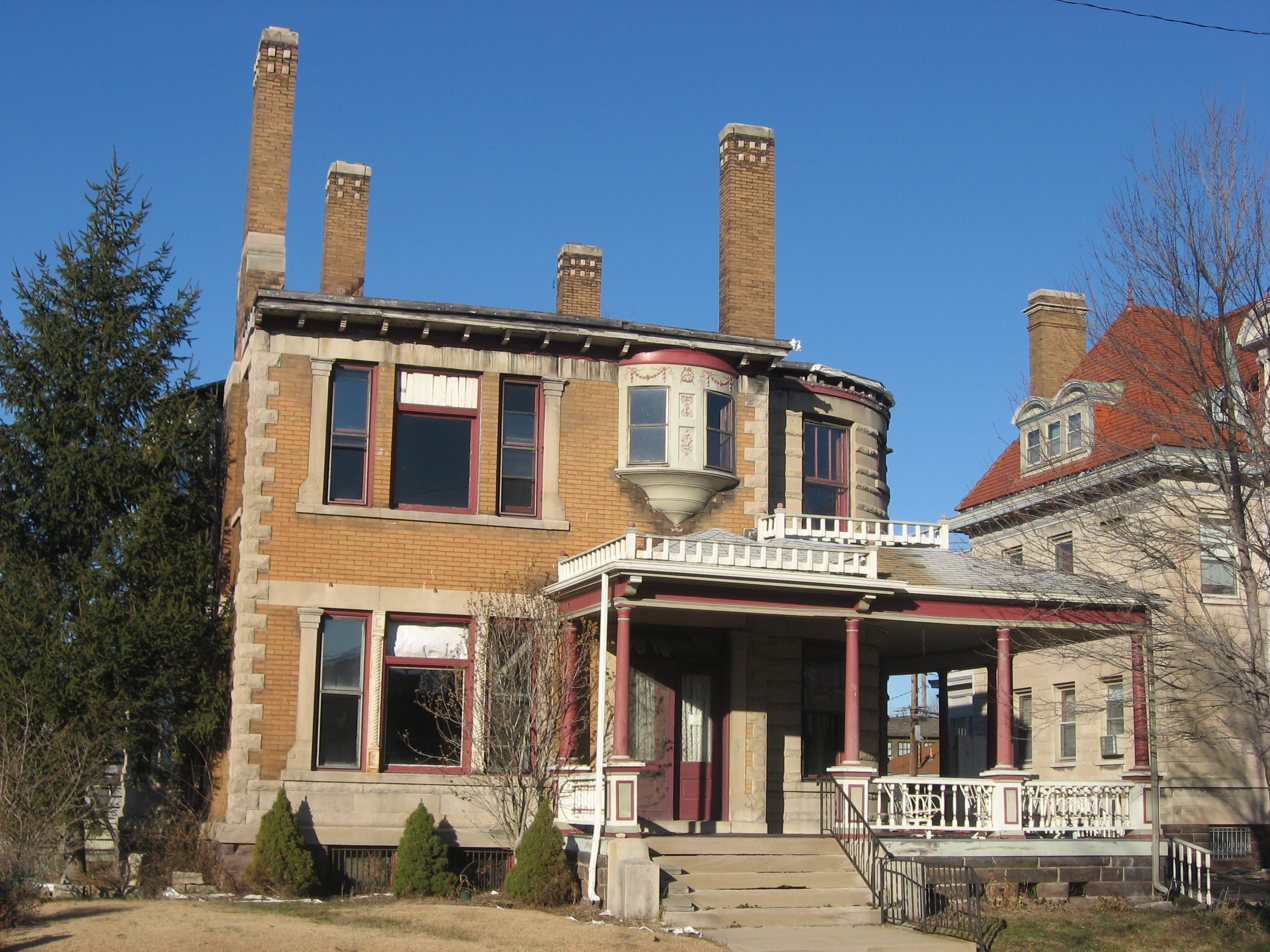
- J.C. Johnson House, January 2012

- Location within Indiana Location within the United States
- Location: 322 E. Washington, Muncie, Indiana
- Coordinates: 40°11′40″N 85°23′1″W
- Area: Less than one acre
- Built: 1897
- Architect: Grindle & Weatherhogg
- Architectural style: Queen Anne, Romanesque
- NRHP reference No.: 82000032

Significant dates
- Added to NRHP: July 15, 1982
- Removed from NRHP: September 11, 2018

J. C. Johnson House was a historic home located at Muncie, Indiana. It was designed by the noted Fort Wayne architectural firm Grindle & Weatherhogg and built in 1897. It is a two-and-a-half-story brick dwelling with Queen Anne and Romanesque Revival style design elements. It features a projecting tower, two-story bay constructed of limestone, four slender chimneys, and a slate roof with decorative ridge trim.

The home is named for its most famous resident, John C. Johnson, a prominent local businessman originally from New York. His brother and business partner, Abbott Johnson, founded the Warner Gear Company, which later formed BorgWarner.

It was added to the National Register of Historic Places in 1982, and delisted in 2018. It is located in the Goldsmith C. Gilbert Historic District.
