= Kimbro (surname) =

Kimbro is a surname. Notable people with the surname include:

- Henry Kimbro (1912–1999), American Negro league outfielder
- Truman Kimbro (1919–1944), United States Army soldier and a recipient of the Medal of Honor for actions in World War II
- Warren Kimbro (1934–2009), Black Panther Party member in New Haven, Connecticut who was found guilty of murder
