= Kimbro, Texas =

Kimbro
- Unincorporated community
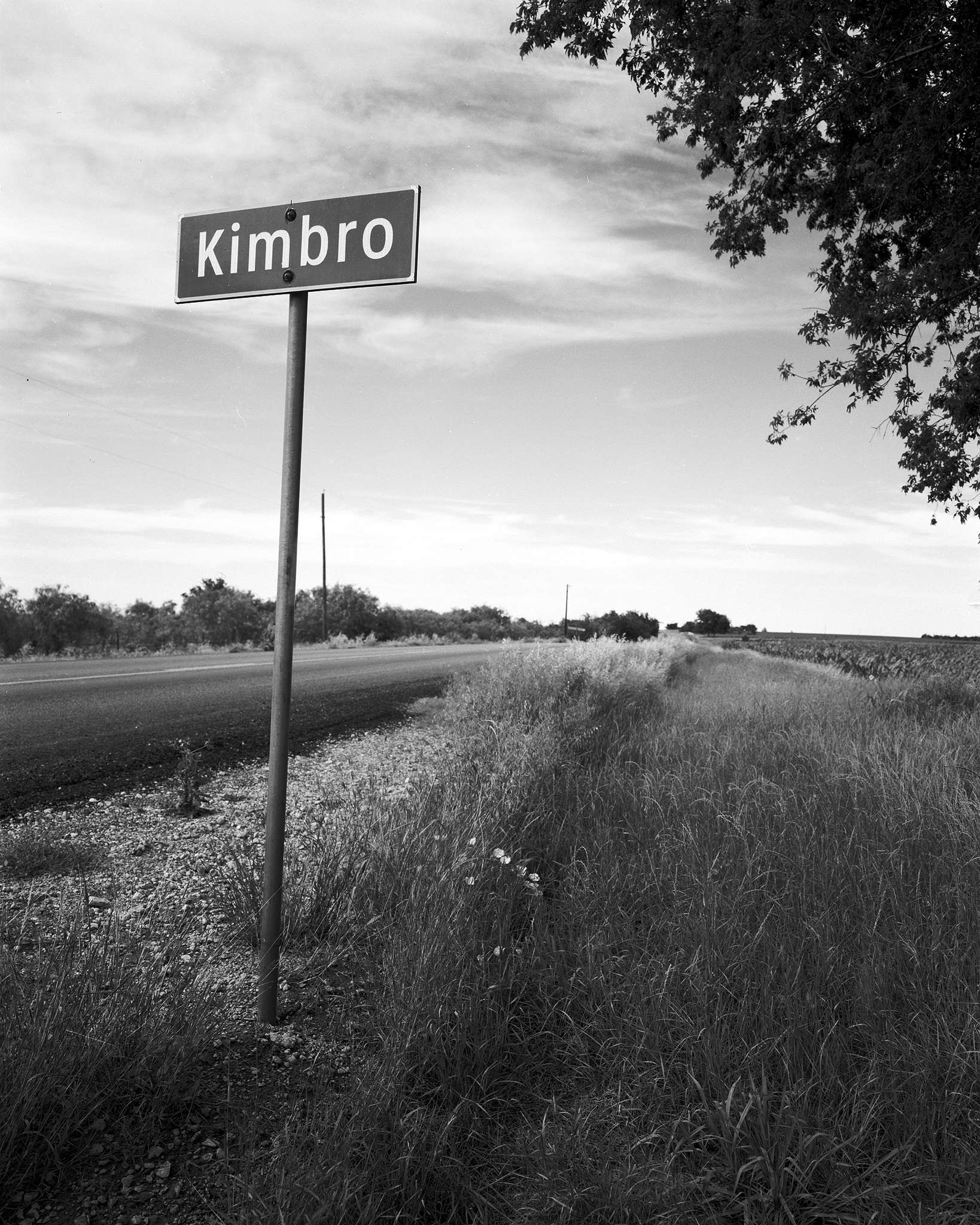
- Kimbro, Texas sign

- Location within the state of Texas Kimbro (the United States)
- Coordinates: 30°23′19″N 97°28′17″W
- Country: United States
- State: Texas
- County: Travis

Population (1990)
  - Total: 50
- Time zone: UTC-6 (Central (CST))
  - Summer (DST): UTC-5 (CDT)

Kimbro is an unincorporated community in northeast Travis County, Texas, United States.

== History ==
Situated on Farm to Market Road 1100, the community was named for landowner Lemuel Kimbro. Originally named Cottonwood for its vicinity to Cottonwood Creek. was first settled in the 1870s by families from Sweden, Norway, and Germany. Most families engaged in cotton farming. A post office opened in 1901 and closed the following year. In 1947, the community's school closed and was consolidated into the Manda Consolidated School District. In 1954, the Swedish Evangelical Free Church of Kimbro moved to nearby Elgin. As of 1990, its population is 50.
