= Francis T. Roots Building =

- U.S. National Register of Historic Places
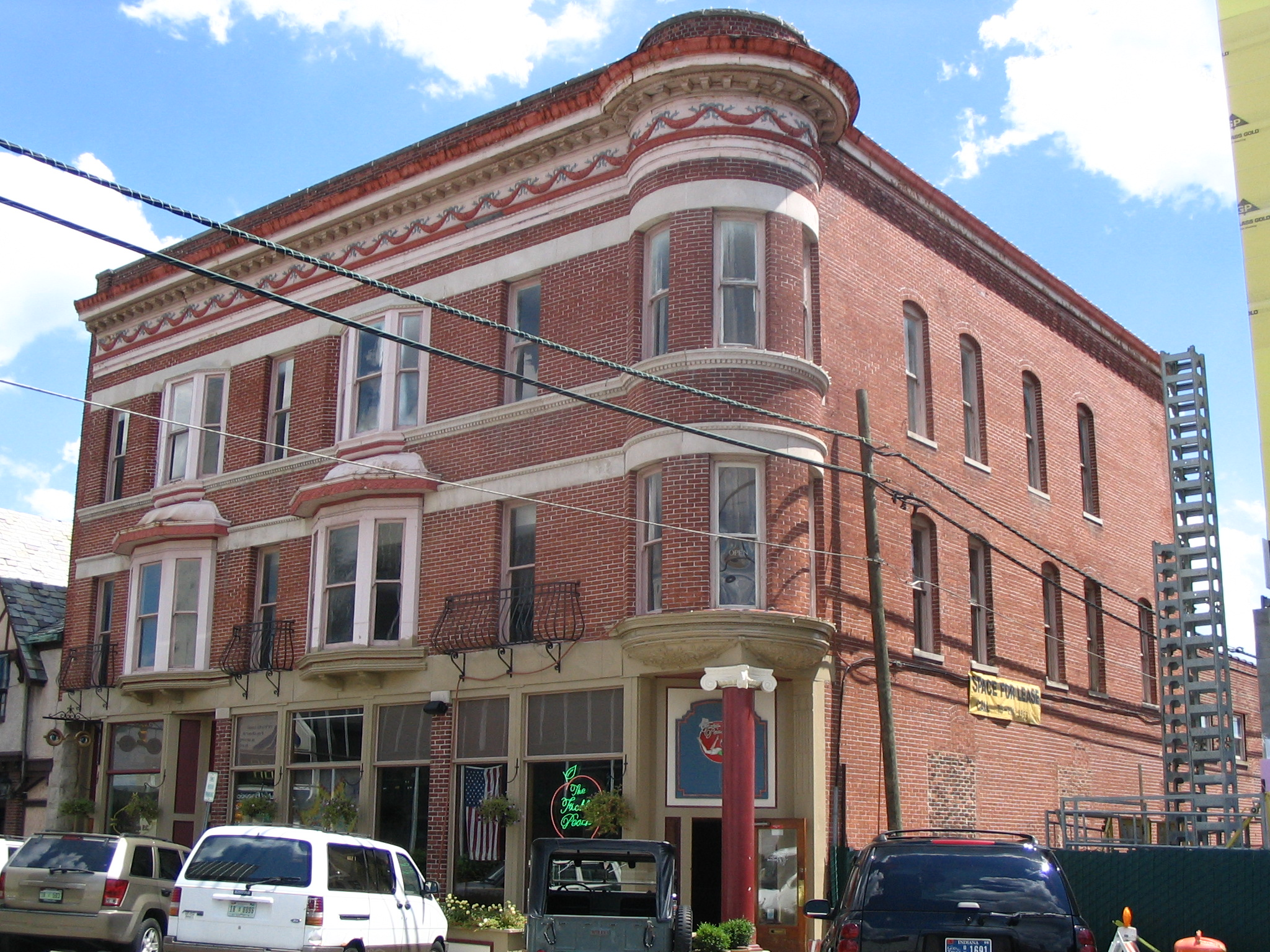
- Roots Building, July 2007

- Location within Indiana Location within the United States
- Location: 115-119 E. Charles St., Muncie, Indiana
- Coordinates: 40°11′27″N 85°23′9″W
- Area: less than one acre
- Built: 1895
- Architectural style: Queen Anne
- NRHP reference No.: 85000605
- Added to NRHP: March 21, 1985

Francis T. Roots Building, also known as the Roots Building, is a historic commercial building located at Muncie, Indiana. It was built in 1895, and is a three-story, square plan, Queen Anne style brick building. The building features marble and limestone panels, projecting bays, and a corner turret. The building was remodeled about 1940 and restored in the 1980s.

It was added to the National Register of Historic Places in 1984.
