= Walnut Street Historic District (Muncie, Indiana) =

Historic district in Indiana, United States

- U.S. National Register of Historic Places
- U.S. Historic district
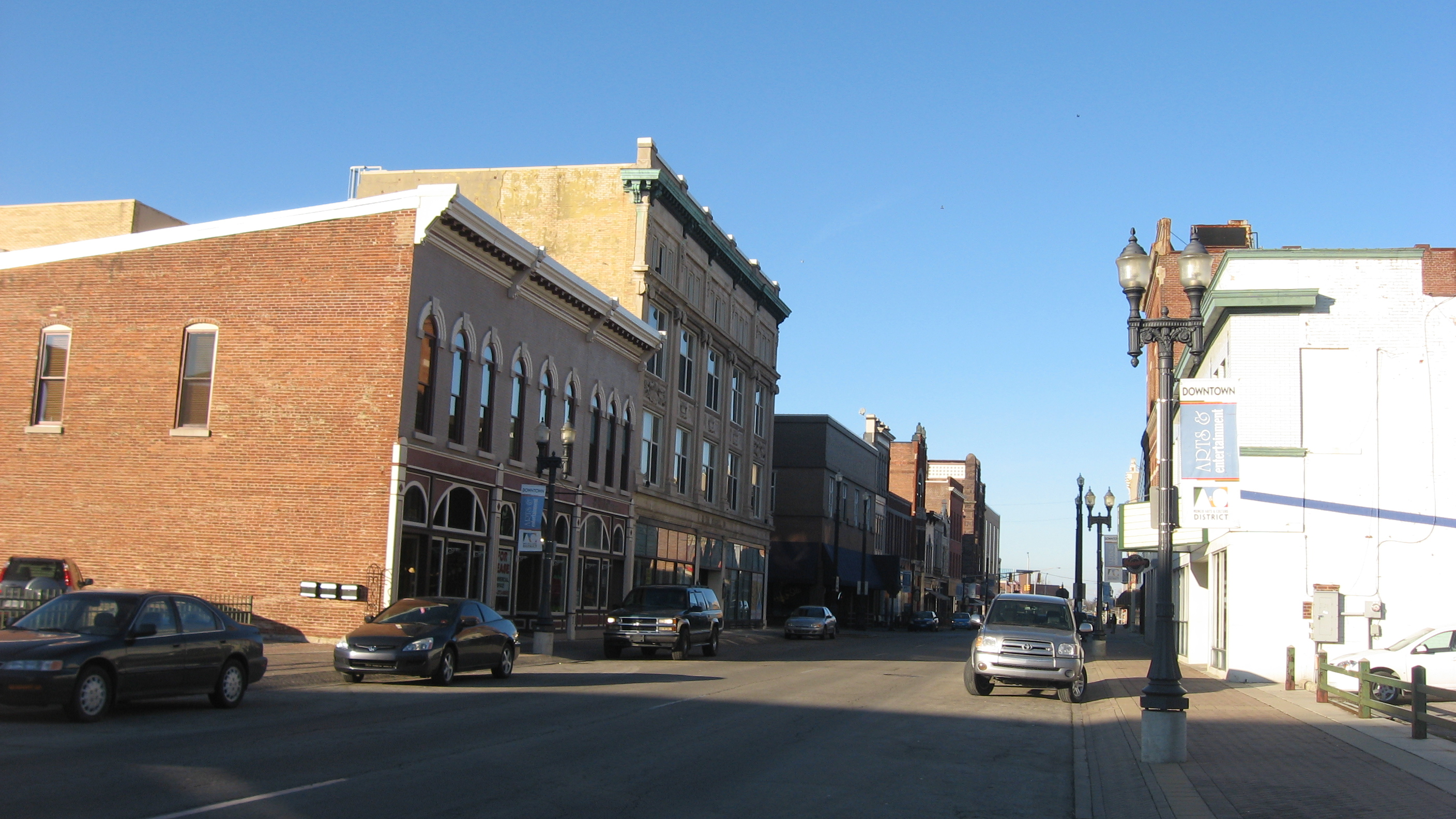
- South Walnut Street, January 2012

- Location within Indiana Location within the United States
- Location: Roughly Walnut St. from Washington to Victor Sts., Muncie, Indiana
- Coordinates: 40°11′31″N 85°23′11″W
- Area: 18 acres (7.3 ha)
- Architect: Taylor, James Knox; Et al.
- Architectural style: Late 19th And 20th Century Revivals, Late Victorian, 20th Century Functional
- MPS: Downtown Muncie MRA
- NRHP reference No.: 88002112
- Added to NRHP: February 17, 1989

Walnut Street Historic District is a national historic district located at Muncie, Indiana. It encompasses 66 contributing buildings and 1 contributing object, and is located in the central business district of Muncie. The district includes notable examples of Italianate, Late Victorian, Colonial Revival, and Beaux-Arts style architecture. Located in the district are the separately listed Moore-Youse-Maxon House, Roberts Hotel, and Goddard Warehouse. Other notable buildings include the Patterson Bock (c. 1876), McNaughton Block (1901–1903), Mitchell Block (1909), American National Bank Building (1924), Marsh Block (1888), and the Old Post Office designed by the Office of the Supervising Architect under James Knox Taylor (1907, 1930).

It was added to the National Register of Historic Places in 1989.
