= Old West End Historic District (Muncie, Indiana) =

Historic district in Indiana, United States

- U.S. National Register of Historic Places
- U.S. Historic district
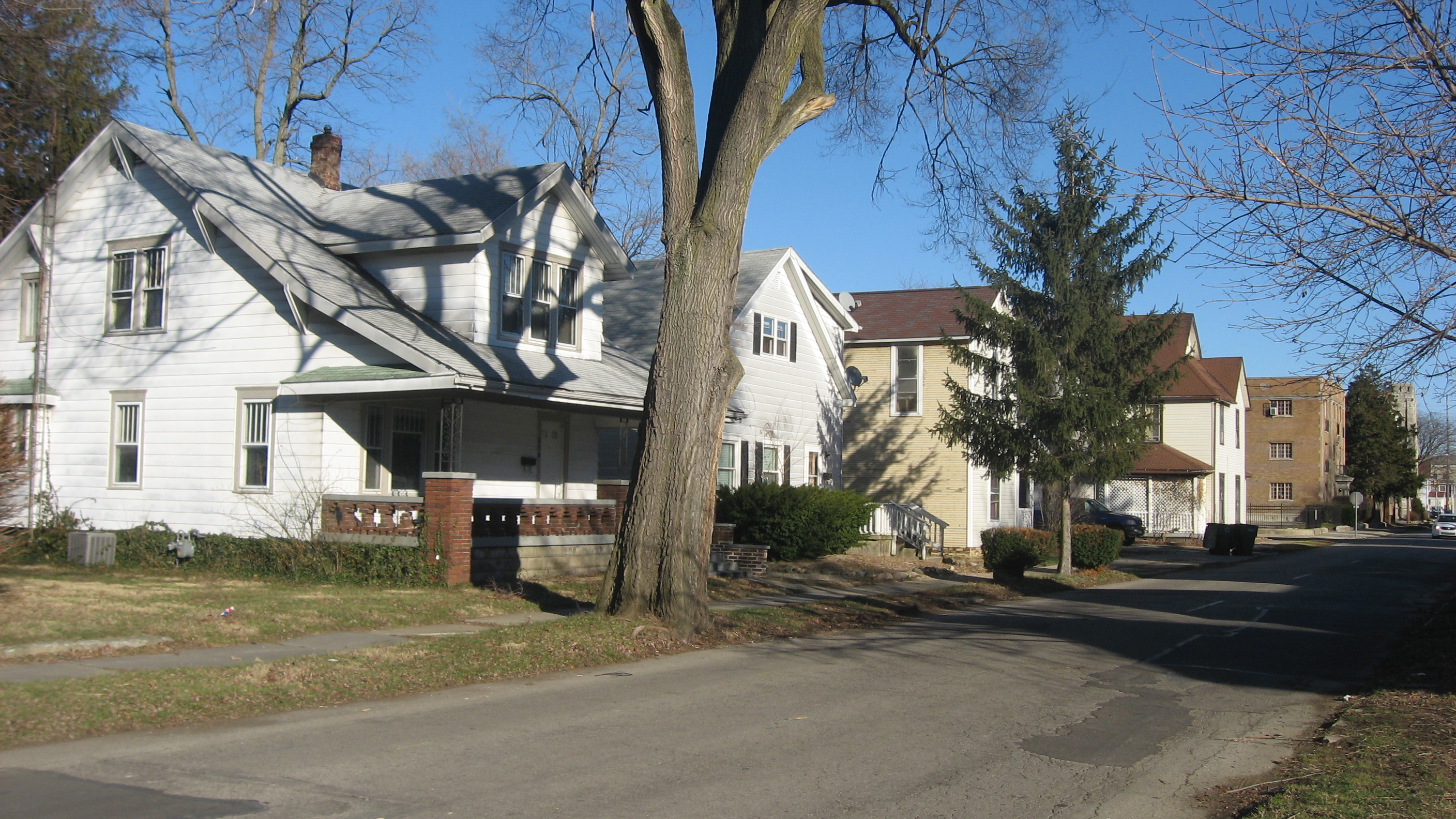
- Adams Street in West End, January 2012

- Location within Indiana Location within the United States
- Location: Roughly bounded by the White River and Washington St., Liberty St., Horward St. and Orchard Pl., and Kilgore Ave., Muncie, Indiana
- Coordinates: 40°11′31″N 85°23′35″W
- Area: 55 acres (22 ha)
- Architect: Smenner & Houck; Et al.
- Architectural style: Late Victorian
- NRHP reference No.: 86002721
- Added to NRHP: September 22, 1986

Old West End Historic District is a national historic district located at Muncie, Indiana. It encompasses 273 contributing buildings in a predominantly residential section of Muncie. The district largely developed between about 1880 and 1915, and includes notable examples of Late Victorian style architecture. Notable buildings include Temple Beth-El (1922), First Church of Christ Scientist, Wittmore Apartments (c. 1910), Martin Sisters House (1879–1880), Christian Church / Wesleyan Chapel (1875), Vandercook House (1887), First English Lutheran Church (c. 1891), Muncie Hospital and Invalids Home (1890), and Ira Hunter House (c. 1865).

It was added to the National Register of Historic Places in 1986.
