= Meeks Avenue Historic District =

Historic district in Indiana, United States

- U.S. National Register of Historic Places
- U.S. Historic district
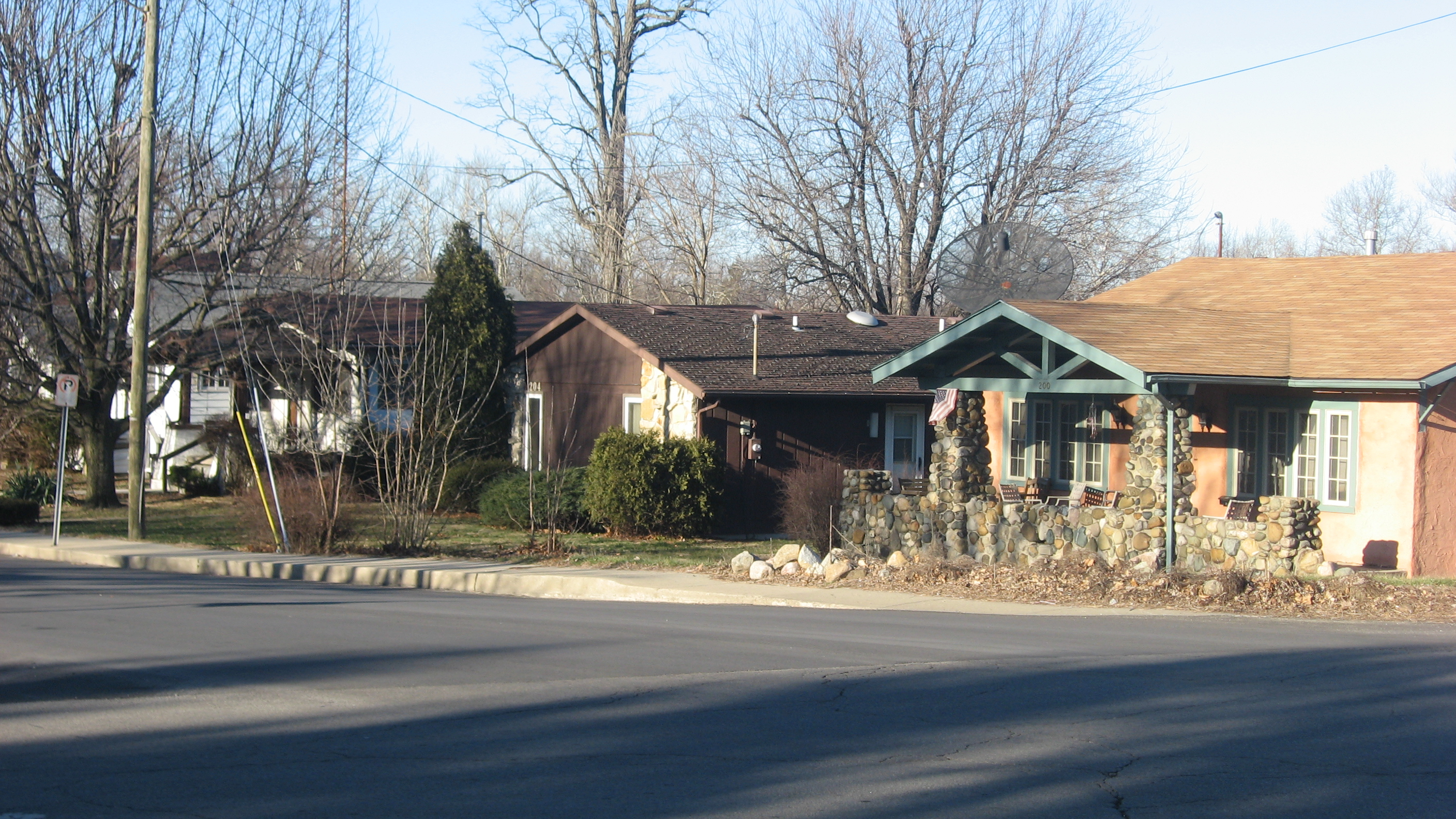
- Houses in the Meeks Avenue Historic District, January 2012

- Location within Indiana Location within the United States
- Location: 200-331 N. Meeks Ave., Muncie, Indiana
- Coordinates: 40°11′45″N 85°23′36″W
- Area: 4.5 acres (1.8 ha)
- Built: 1904
- Architectural style: Bungalow/craftsman, Early Commercial
- NRHP reference No.: 99001105
- Added to NRHP: September 9, 1999

Meeks Avenue Historic District is a national historic district located at Muncie, Indiana, USA. It encompasses 25 contributing buildings in a predominantly residential section of Muncie. The district developed between about 1904 and 1939, and includes notable examples of Bungalow / American Craftsman style architecture. A notable building is a service station constructed in 1939.

It was added to the National Register of Historic Places in 1999.
