= Grace Keiser Maring Library =

- U.S. National Register of Historic Places
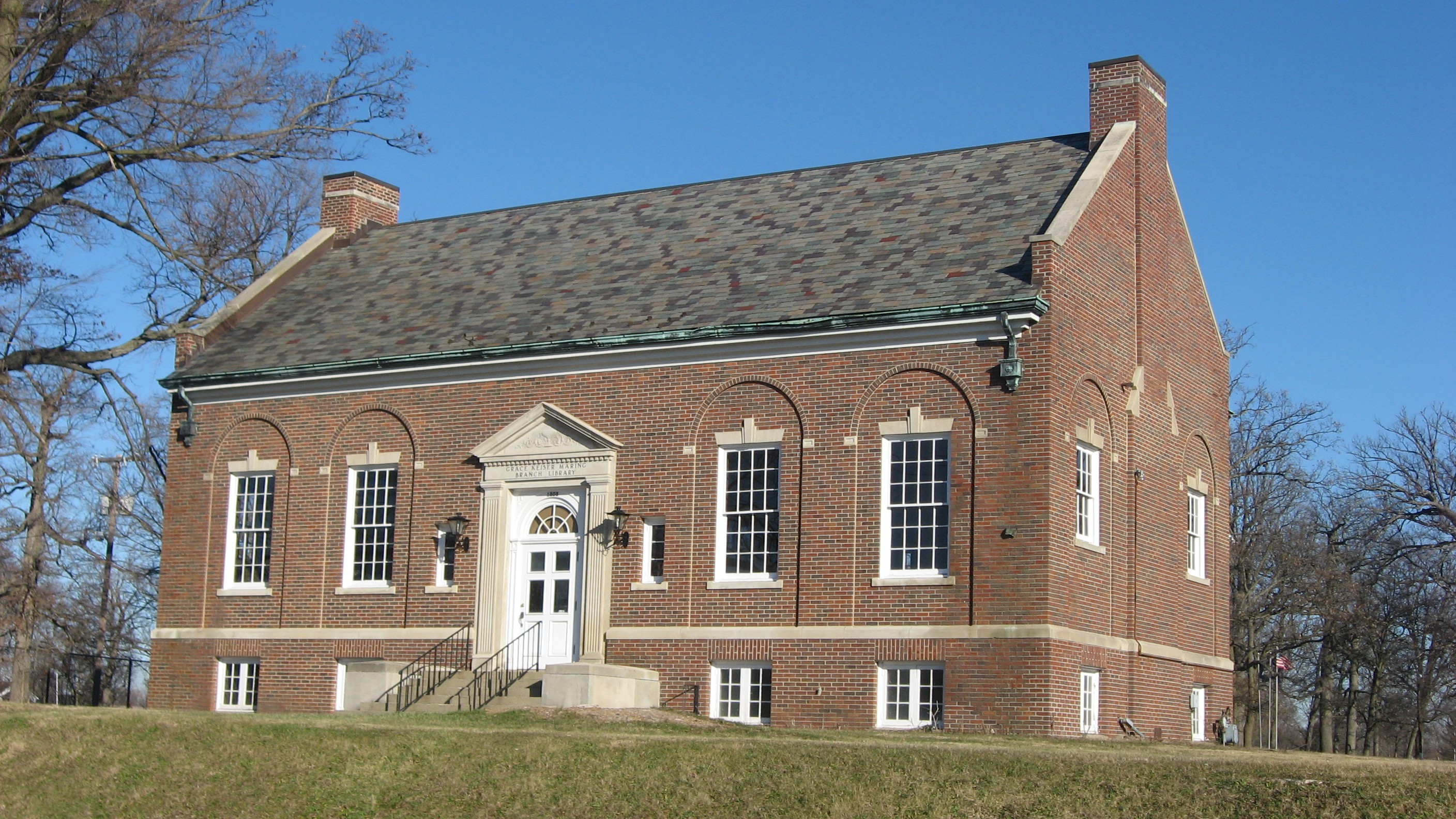
- Front and southern end of the library

- Location within Indiana Location within the United States
- Location: 1808 S. Madison St., Muncie, Indiana
- Coordinates: 40°10′44″N 85°22′50″W
- Area: Less than 1 acre (0.40 ha)
- Architect: Houck and Smenner; A.J. Glaser
- Architectural style: Colonial Revival
- NRHP reference No.: 05001011
- Added to NRHP: September 15, 2005

The Grace Keiser Maring Library is located on the south side of Muncie, Indiana, USA. Built at 1808 South Madision Street, the library is next to Heekin Park, the largest and oldest community park in Muncie. The library was the first branch library built in the city.

== History ==
Grace Maring was the wife of Joel Maring, founder of glass factories throughout Muncie. A philanthropist and advocate for education, she gave the city of Muncie $25,000 on her death to develop a public library system. In 1930, the Grace Keiser Maring Library was dedicated and began serving the south side of Muncie. The library was posted to the National Register of Historic Places on September 15, 2005.

== Architecture ==
The library was designed by architects Herbert Smenner and Charles Houck. The architectural style is a variation of colonial revival, a popular style in the early 20th century. Built from brick and trimmed with limestone, it is the only remaining civic building of this style in Muncie.
