= Riverside Historic District (Muncie, Indiana) =

Historic district in Indiana, United States

- U.S. National Register of Historic Places
- U.S. Historic district
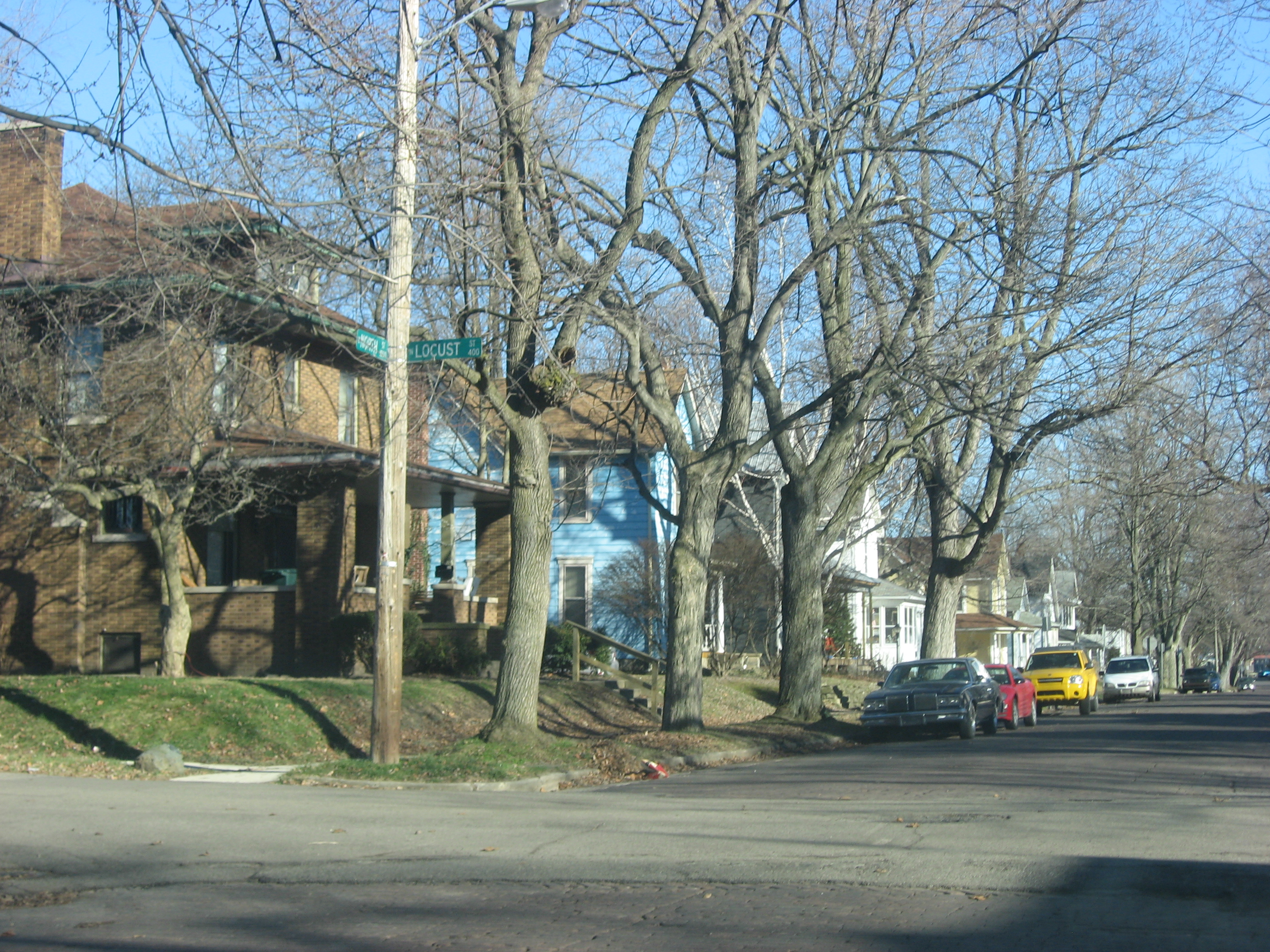
- Locust and North, January 2012

- Location within Indiana Location within the United States
- Location: Roughly bounded by University Ave., Dicks, Gilbert and Light Sts., Muncie, Indiana
- Coordinates: 40°11′47″N 85°24′04″W
- Area: 21 acres (8.5 ha)
- Built: 1895
- Architectural style: Greek Revival, Tudor Revival, et al.
- NRHP reference No.: 99000733
- Added to NRHP: June 25, 1999

Riverside Historic District is a national historic district located at Muncie, Indiana. It encompasses 74 contributing buildings and 1 contributing structure in a predominantly residential section of Muncie. The district developed between about 1895 and 1949, and includes notable examples of Colonial Revival, Tudor Revival, and Bungalow / American Craftsman style architecture.

It was added to the National Register of Historic Places in 1999.
