= W. W. Shirk Building =

- U.S. National Register of Historic Places
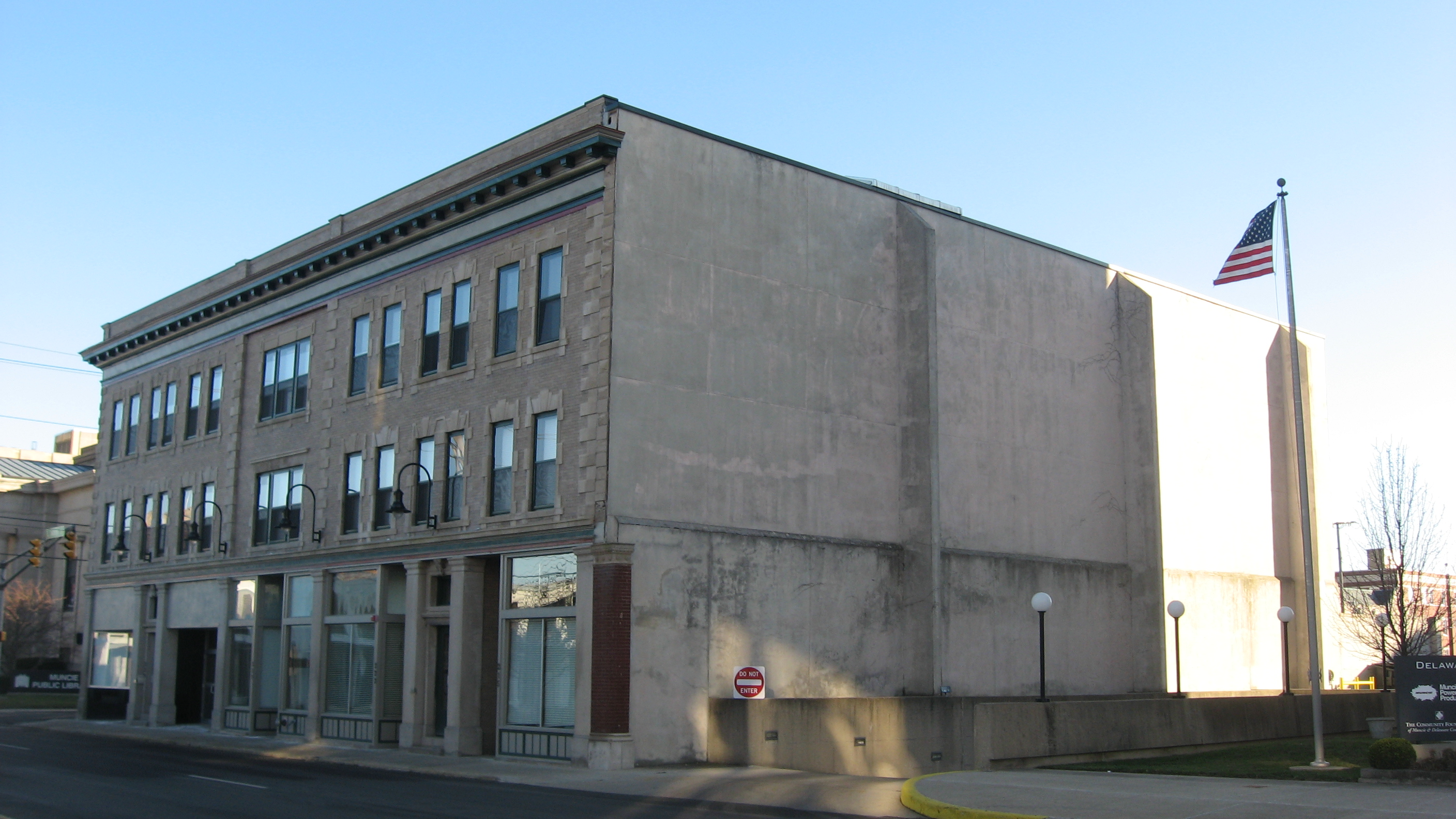
- Front and side of the building

- Location within Indiana Location within the United States
- Location: 219 E. Jackson St., Muncie, Indiana
- Coordinates: 40°11′33″N 85°23′4″W
- Area: Less than 1 acre (0.40 ha)
- Built: 1896
- Architectural style: Late 19th and 20th Century Revivals, Italian Renaissance
- MPS: Downtown Muncie MRA
- NRHP reference No.: 88002116
- Added to NRHP: November 14, 1988

The W. W. Shirk Building, also known as the Canopic Apartments, is located at 219 E. Jackson St. in Muncie, Indiana. The original building was designed for a combination of commercial and residential space. After a 21st-century remodeling led by Flaherty and Collins, the building became solely residential.

== History ==
The Shirk Building was constructed in 1906, with some portions originally dating back to 1889. The apartment building was popular in the early 20th century, but fell into disrepair during the 1980s and 1990s, when the building went almost completely vacant.

It was added to the National Register of Historic Places in 1988.

By 2005, the W. W. Shirk Building had been tagged by city building inspectors as potentially needing demolition, due to the deterioration over the years of little usage. The Indianapolis-based developing firm of Flaherty and Collins began a heavy remodeling of the building in 2008 and brought the W. W. Shirk to its current status in 2009.

== Architecture ==
The W. W. Shirk Building is a three-story apartment building in the Italian Renaissance Revival style. The brick and limestone construction of the building is similar to other flats and apartments built in Muncie during the same time period.

== Renovation ==
In 2008, the developer Flaherty and Collins began renovating the building. The project was granted historic building tax credits, which helped the developers begin the renovation with a more manageable budget. The first floor of the building, which was originally designed for commercial use, was turned into residential apartments, while the upper level apartments were completely renovated and restored.

Flaherty and Collins' project also included the renovation of nine historic homes in downtown Muncie, Indiana. The cost of the W. W. Shirk renovation alone came in at $3.1 million. The project altogether, including the nine historic homes, came in at $6 million.

== Current status ==
The Canopic Apartments include 24 living units ranging from one to two bedroom apartments, as well as one efficiency unit. The modern apartments in this 19th-century building include all the modern living needs, ranging from a high-tech security system to computer and internet access, as well as classic design features, including 10-foot ceilings and hardwood floors. Although these residential units were renovated in 2008, Flaherty & Collins salvaged as many of the classic and original features as possible, including the original built-ins, flooring, crown molding, and fireplaces.
