= Judson Building =

- U.S. National Register of Historic Places
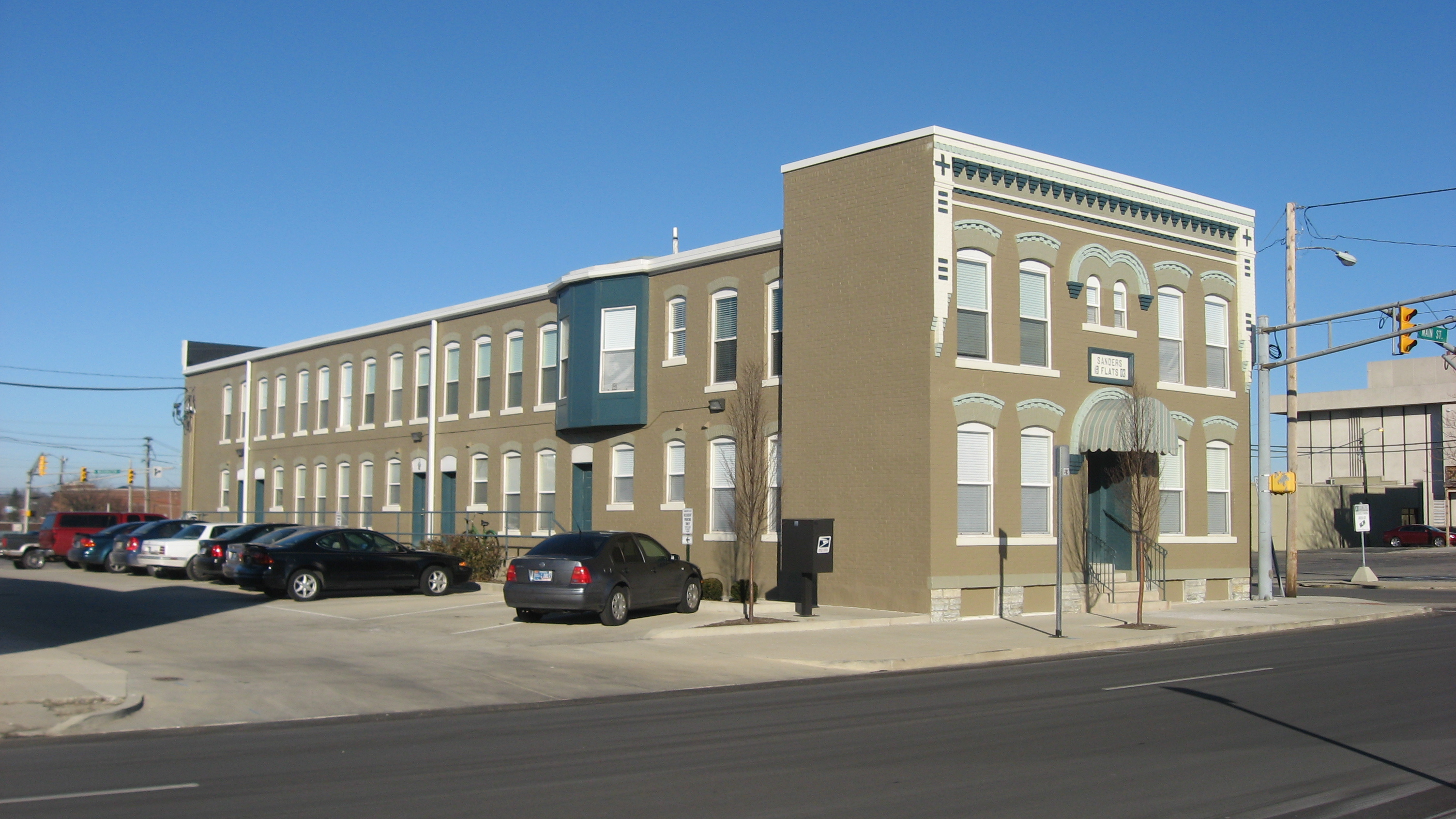
- Judson Building, January 2012

- Location within Indiana Location within the United States
- Location: 300 W. Main St., Muncie, Indiana
- Coordinates: 40°11′38″N 85°23′20″W
- Area: less than one acre
- Built: c. 1900
- Architectural style: Romanesque
- MPS: Downtown Muncie MRA
- NRHP reference No.: 88002127
- Added to NRHP: November 14, 1988

Judson Building is a historic apartment building located at Muncie, Indiana. It was built about 1900, and is a two-story, five bay by nine bay, Romanesque Revival style red brick building. It has a flat roof, segmental arch openings, and projecting angular bays.

It was added to the National Register of Historic Places in 1988.
