= William Kimbrough Pendleton House =

Historic house in Florida, United States

- U.S. National Register of Historic Places
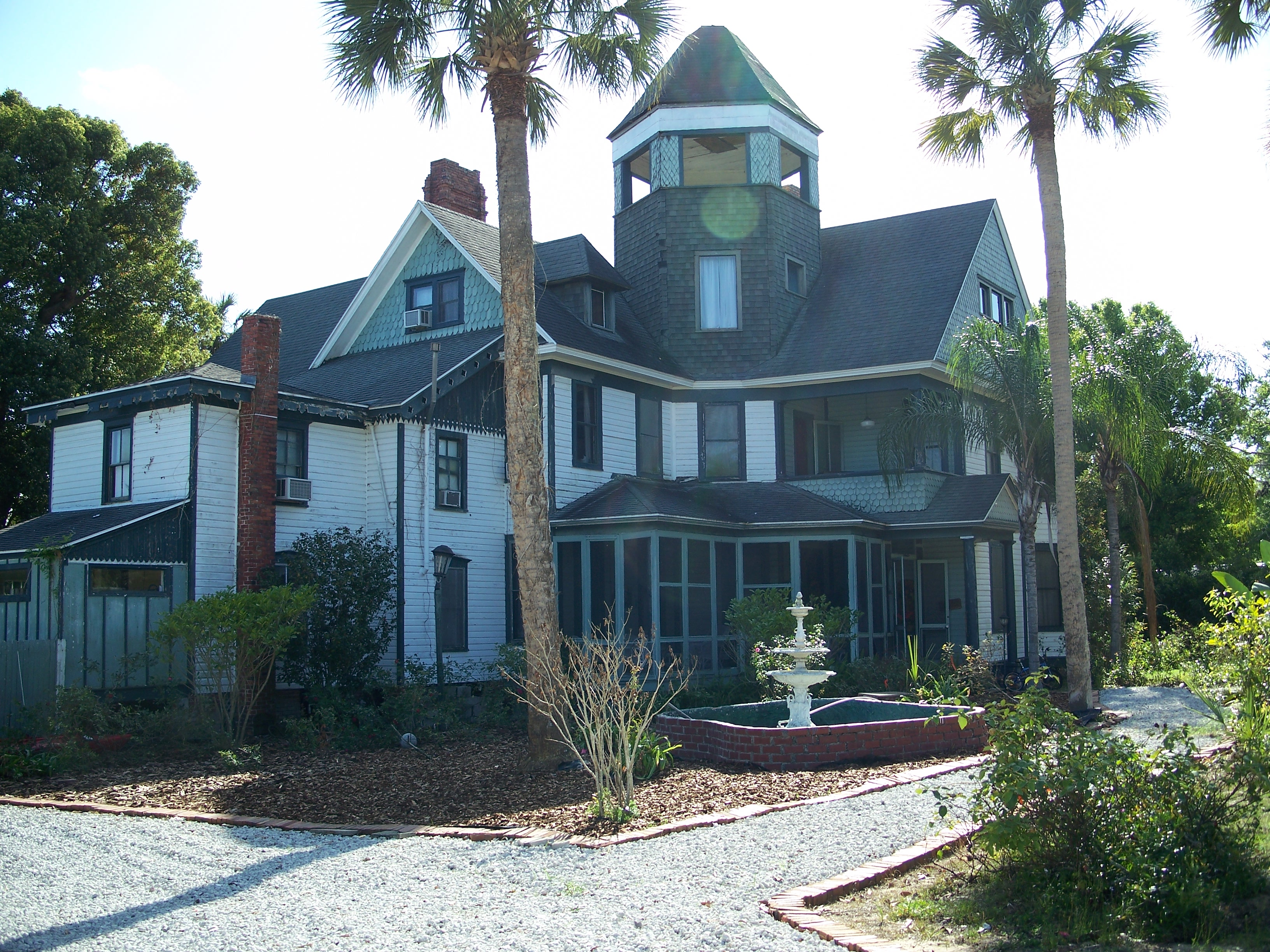

- Location within Florida Location within the United States
- Location: Eustis, Florida
- Coordinates: 28°50′26″N 81°40′35″W
- Area: 1 acre (0.40 ha)
- Built: c. 1876
- Architect: William Kimbrough Pendleton
- Architectural style: Queen Anne
- NRHP reference No.: 83001427
- Added to NRHP: January 13, 1983

The William Kimbrough Pendleton House (also known as The Palms) is a historic house located at 1208 Chesterfield Court in Eustis, Florida. On January 13, 1983, it was added to the National Register of Historic Places.

== Description and history ==
The home is named for its most illustrious owner, William Kimbrough Pendleton, who moved here in 1886 in retirement; the house served as his home until his death. The house was expanded during his ownership and retains the look of that 1886 remodeling to this day.

Pendleton had served as the Second President of Bethany College. He was born in Yanceyville, Virginia, September 7, 1817, and died at Bethany, West Virginia, on September 1, 1899.
