= Goldsmith C. Gilbert Historic District =

Historic district in Indiana, United States

- U.S. National Register of Historic Places
- U.S. Historic district
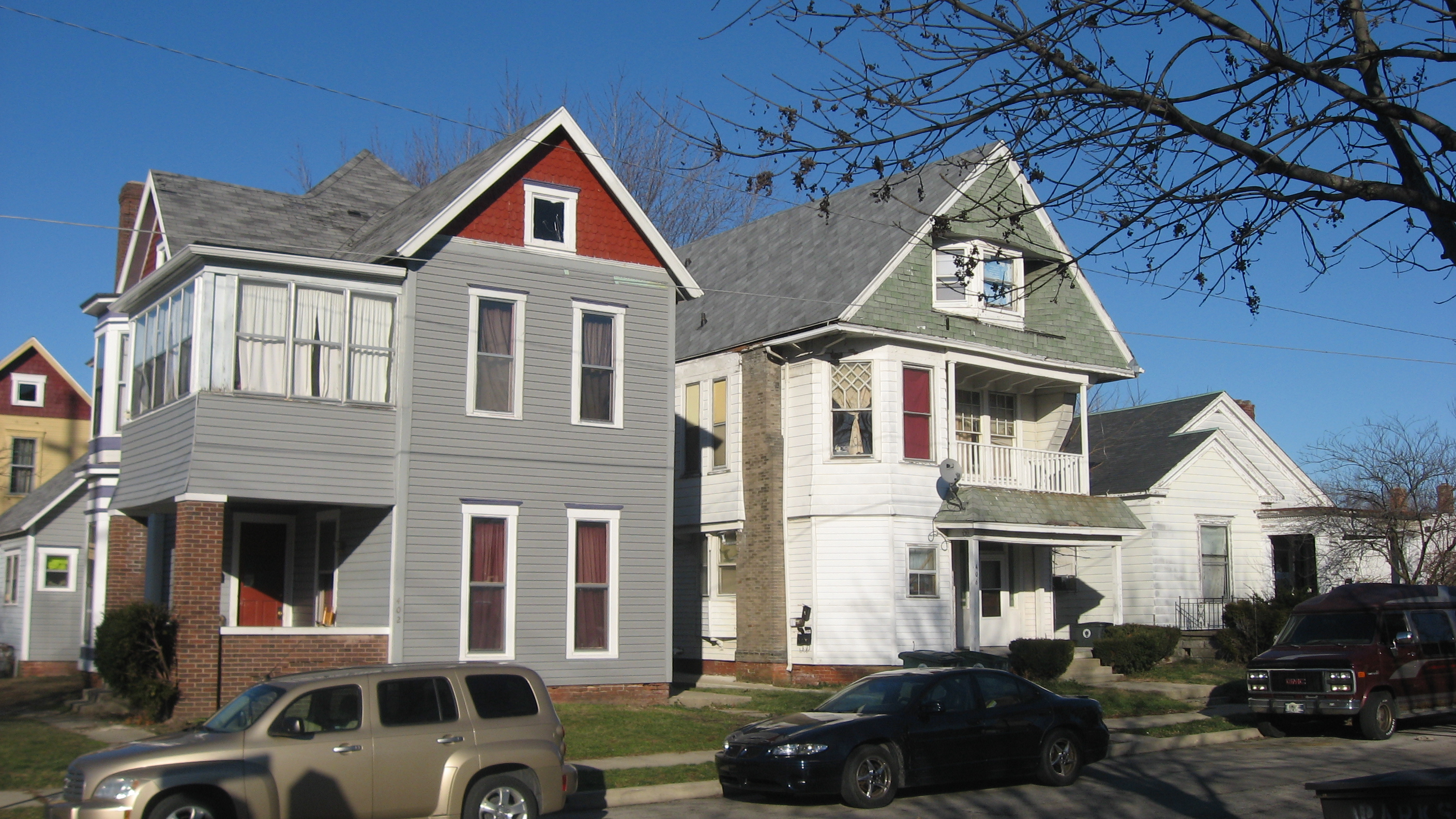
- Houses in the Goldsmith Gilbert Historic District, January 2012

- Location within Indiana Location within the United States
- Location: Roughly bounded by Wysor St., N. Madison St., E. Washington St., and Mulberry St., Muncie, Indiana
- Coordinates: 40°11′43″N 85°22′58″W
- Area: 20 acres (8.1 ha)
- Architectural style: Late 19th And 20th Century Revivals, Bungalow/craftsman, Late Victorian
- MPS: Downtown Muncie MRA
- NRHP reference No.: 88002113
- Added to NRHP: November 14, 1988

Goldsmith C. Gilbert Historic District is a national historic district located at Muncie, Indiana. It encompasses 75 contributing buildings and is located in the oldest residential section of Muncie. The district includes notable examples of Late Victorian, Colonial Revival, and Bungalow / American Craftsman style architecture. Located in the district is the separately listed J.C. Johnson House. Other notable buildings include the A.L. Johnson House, Meeks Mortuary Building, Joseph Hummel House, and Miller Livery (1916).

The district is named for Goldsmith C. Gilbert, a prominent resident in Muncie's early history. Arriving in the area in 1823, Gilbert built a log cabin (partially within the modern boundaries of the District) as well as a trading post (in northern Delaware County, outside of the District).

The J.C. Johnson and A.L. Johnson Houses were lived in by brothers and local businessmen, John C. Johnson and Abbott L. Johnson, originally from New York. Abbott Johnson founded the Warner Gear Company, which later formed BorgWarner.

Meeks Mortuary, founded in 1844, is still open today, making it Delaware County's oldest operational business. The Meeks family is one of Delaware County's oldest families and owned various other businesses in the county. Members of another of Muncie's "pioneer families", the Lefflers, also resided in the District.

It was added to the National Register of Historic Places in 1988.
