= Emily Kimbrough Historic District =

Historic district in Indiana, United States

- Emily Kimbrough Historic District and Boundary Increase
- U.S. National Register of Historic Places
- U.S. Historic district
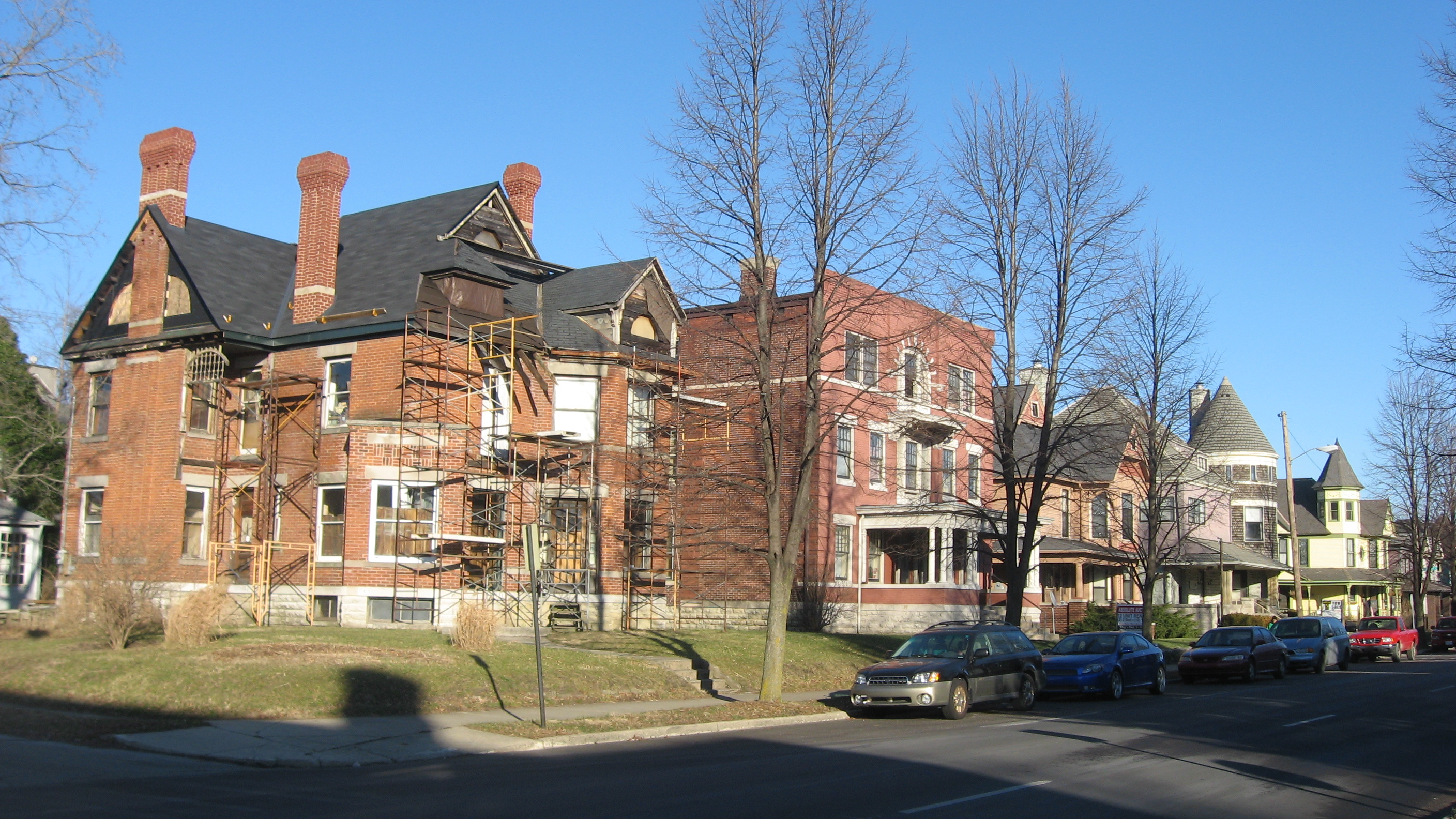
- Houses in the district

- Location within Indiana Location within the United States
- Location: Bounded by Monroe, E. Washington, Hackley, and E. Charles Sts., and roughly by E. Gilbert, Beacon, E. Charles, and Madison Sts., Muncie, Indiana
- Coordinates: 40°11′34″N 85°22′43″W
- Area: 30.1 acres (12.2 ha); 25.6 acres (10.4 ha)
- Built: 1880
- Architect: Multiple
- Architectural style: Italianate, Queen Anne, Neoclassical, American Craftsman, bungalow
- NRHP reference No.: 80000032; 89000779
- Added to NRHP: November 13, 1980; June 29, 1989

The Emily Kimbrough Historic District is a historical neighborhood in downtown Muncie, Indiana, USA. Established as a Muncie local historical district in 1976, it was eventually added to the National Register of Historic Places on November 13, 1980. The district is bounded by Monroe, East Washington, Hackley and East Charles Streets. The boundaries were later increased to roughly East Gilbert, Beacon Street, East Charles Street and Madison Street on June 29, 1989.

== History ==
The district was named after the author and journalist Emily Kimbrough, who spent much of her childhood there. Her former home, located at 715 East Washington, is still standing. Muncie and her old "East End" neighborhood are reflected in much of her writing.

Muncie became a commercial and industrial center of east central Indiana after the discovery of natural gas in 1886. Most houses in the district were built after the discovery; citizens who profited from the natural gas enterprise built many of the houses. The district soon became the neighborhood of Muncie's socially elite and prosperous citizens.

The Great Depression brought a decline in Muncie's economy, and many of the homes in the district fell into decay. The neighborhood experienced even more neglect after the end of World War II, some even being demolished. In the late 20th century, the city of Muncie began redeveloping the downtown area and also began restoring the historic neighborhood. Many homes in the district have now been renovated and restored to their original state.

== Architecture ==
The district contains several of Muncie's significant late Victorian architecture and Post-Victorian houses, many of which were designed by local architects. Many of the homes built after 1886 were more Italianate, which was a largely popular style in Indiana during the 1870s and 1880s. Styles such as Queen Anne, Free Classic, and Colonial Revival are also very popular in the neighborhood.

== Contemporary significance ==
The district remains a significant part of Muncie history and culture. Since 1976, the East Central Neighborhood Association in Muncie has sponsored the Old Washington Street Festival. The festival is held annually in the neighborhood, promoting the historical gas boom days and the unique architecture of the homes. The festival offers house tours of the many homes in the district.

== Notable residents ==
Many of Muncie's most famous residents resided in the district.

- Emily Kimbrough - author and journalist; spent much of her childhood in the district and included the neighborhood in many of her writings
- C. M. Kimbrough - president of the Indiana Bridge Company
- John F. Wildman - owner of Muncie Times newspaper
- Charles Over - owner of Over Glass Works
- Cathy Day - novelist and short story writer
