= West Washington Street Bridge (Muncie, Indiana) =

- U.S. National Register of Historic Places
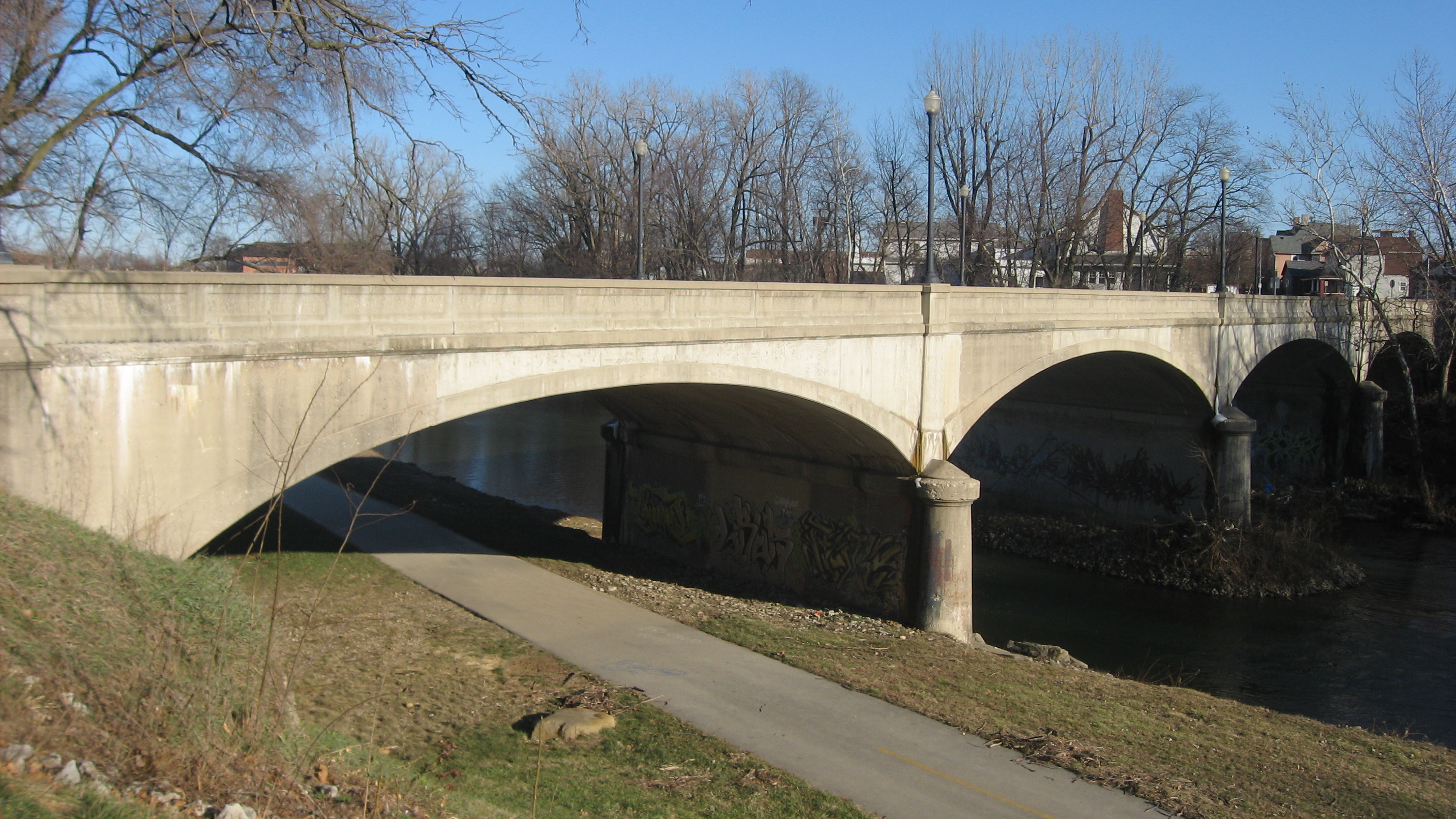
- Downstream side of the bridge

- Location within Indiana Location within the United States
- Location: W. Washington St. over the West Fork White River in Muncie, Indiana
- Coordinates: 40°11′42″N 85°23′29″W
- Area: Less than 1 acre (0.40 ha)
- Architect: Burk Construction Co.; Charles M. Armintrout
- Architectural style: Concrete Arch
- NRHP reference No.: 08000187
- Added to NRHP: March 19, 2008

The West Washington Street Bridge is a historic concrete arch bridge in Muncie, Indiana, United States. It spans the White River, connecting Washington Street and Meeks Avenue. It was designed by Charles Armintrout, who was the Delaware County Engineer at the time. The bridge has four elliptical arch spans. The steel reinforcements of the arch rings extend deep into the bridge's piers and abutments, allowing the piers to be substantially thinner. This design was inspired by the works of Edwin Thacher. Although this bridge is made of concrete, a series of recessed panels, which have the aggregate exposed, provides texture and contrast.

Three plaques are embedded into the railing of the bridge. Two of the plaques include the names of the Delaware County Commissioners, the County Auditor, the original construction company, the restoration contractor, and the Delaware County Council. The third plaque includes a commendation regarding the bridge's restoration in 1996.

== History ==
In the late 1920s, the borders of Muncie had expanded. Development associated with Ball State Teachers College and Ball General Hospital created new suburban districts. The various areas of the city and its suburbs had previously been linked by streetcars, but this service was discontinued when automobiles became the main mode of transportation. With this, the West Washington Street Bridge became more important to the community as a route connecting the suburbs with downtown. Originally, a metal truss bridge spanned the White River; however, due to the increased traffic, it was considered unsafe. Plans and specifications for a new bridge were prepared by Charles Armintrout, and they were approved in 1927. At the time, the bridge was estimated to cost $95,000. After delays due to the state's approval process, construction began in 1929 and was completed in 1930, by Burk Construction Company, at a cost of $85,949.

== Design ==
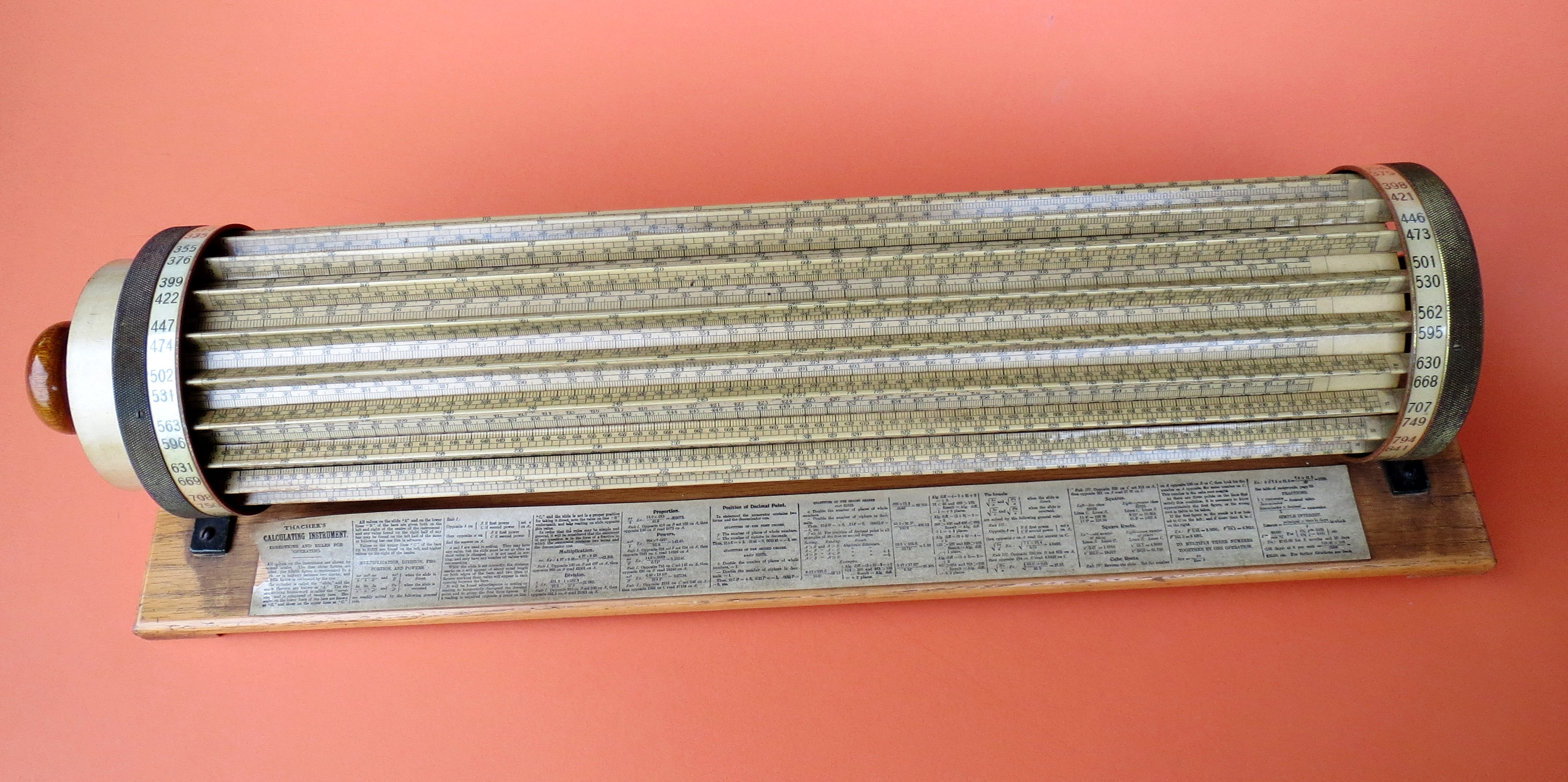
Edwin Thacher's slide rule developed to assist with the calculations required for bridge design.

The design of the West Washington Street Bridge was influenced by the work of Edwin Thacher. Thacher was an engineer who built military bridges during the Civil War. To solve many of the complex mathematical calculations required in designing bridges, Thacher invented and patented a cylindrical slide rule. One of his lasting legacies is his design of the reinforcing system for concrete bridges that was used in the West Washington Street Bridge.

== Historical significance ==
The West Washington Street Bridge has historical significance because of its association with Muncie's growth during the automobile age. The bridge's engineering is also of significance because of its use of the period's engineering innovations. The periods of significance include 1925–1949 and 1950–1974. The West Washington Street Bridge was listed on the National Register of Historic Places in 2008.

== Sources ==
- Slider, Chad (2007). "National Register of Historic Places Inventory/Nomination: West Washington Street Bridge" (PDF). National Park Service.
