= Roberts Hotel =

- U.S. National Register of Historic Places
- U.S. Historic district – Contributing property
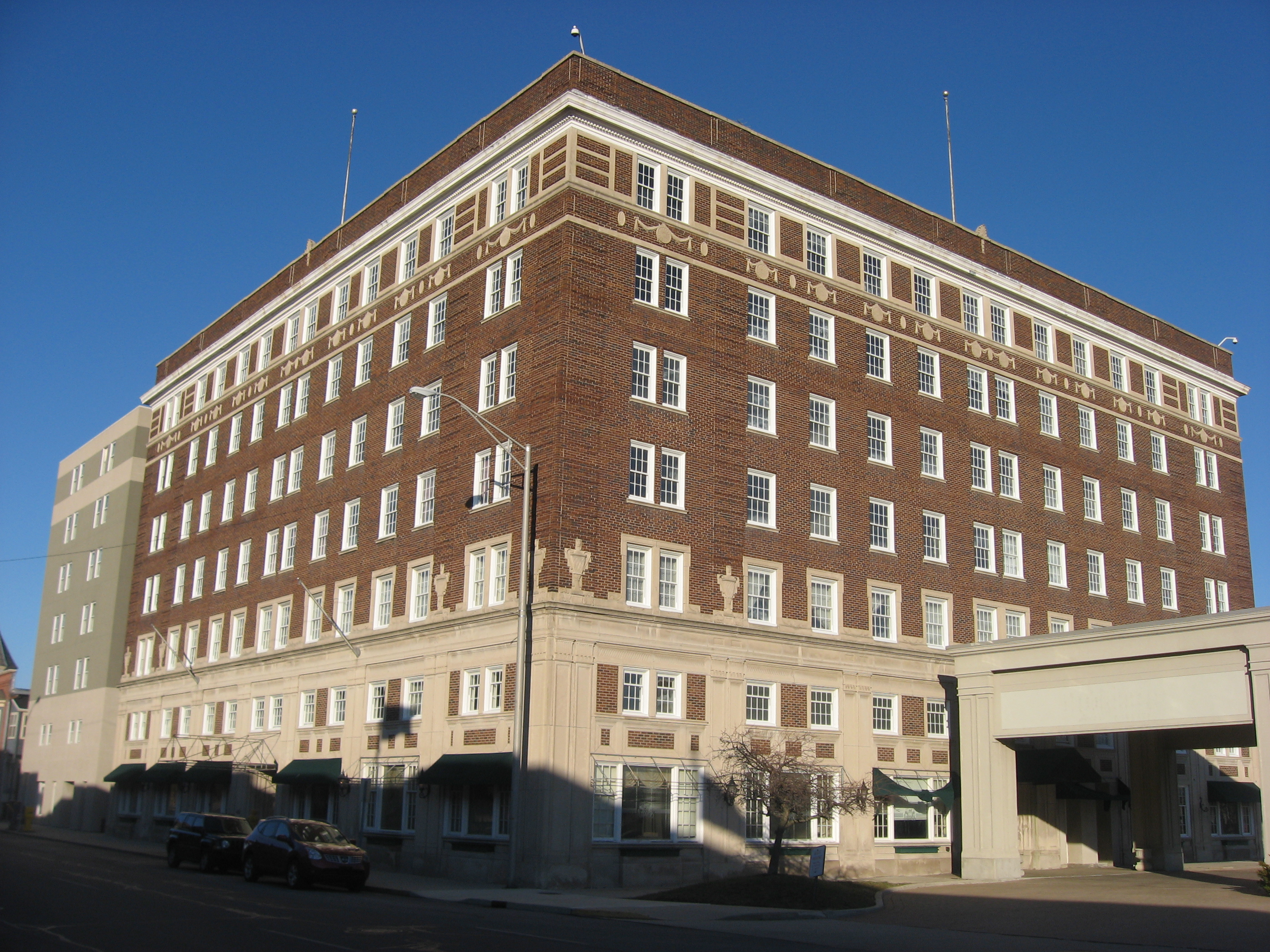
- Roberts Hotel, January 2012

- Location within Indiana Location within the United States
- Location: 420 S. High St., Muncie, Indiana
- Coordinates: 40°11′25″N 85°23′10″W
- Area: 0.6 acres (0.24 ha)
- Built: 1921
- Architect: Nicol, Charles W.; Stoolman, A. W.
- Architectural style: Colonial Revival
- NRHP reference No.: 82000034
- Added to NRHP: July 15, 1982

Roberts Hotel is a historic hotel located at Muncie, Indiana. It was built in 1921, and is a six-story, Colonial Revival style steel-frame building sheathed in red brick with limestone detailing. The basement, first, and mezzanine floors measure 120 feet by 125 feet, where the second through sixth floors above are L-shaped. It has a flat roof behind a parapet. The hotel closed in 1972, but reopened in 1976. The building has been renovated into loft apartments.

It was added to the National Register of Historic Places in 1982. It is located in the Walnut Street Historic District.

George Roberts, the hotel's proprietor, was a Jew who fled from Russia to the United States in the late 1890s, among others from his native village, in order to avoid being drafted into the Russian Czar's army. In Muncie, he also started and owned a dry goods store. George Roberts lost everything in the Depression, entered the oil business, then died of a heart attack in a tent in the oil fields of Tulsa, Oklahoma. His grandson is Henry Kravis.
