= F. D. Rose Building =

- U.S. National Register of Historic Places
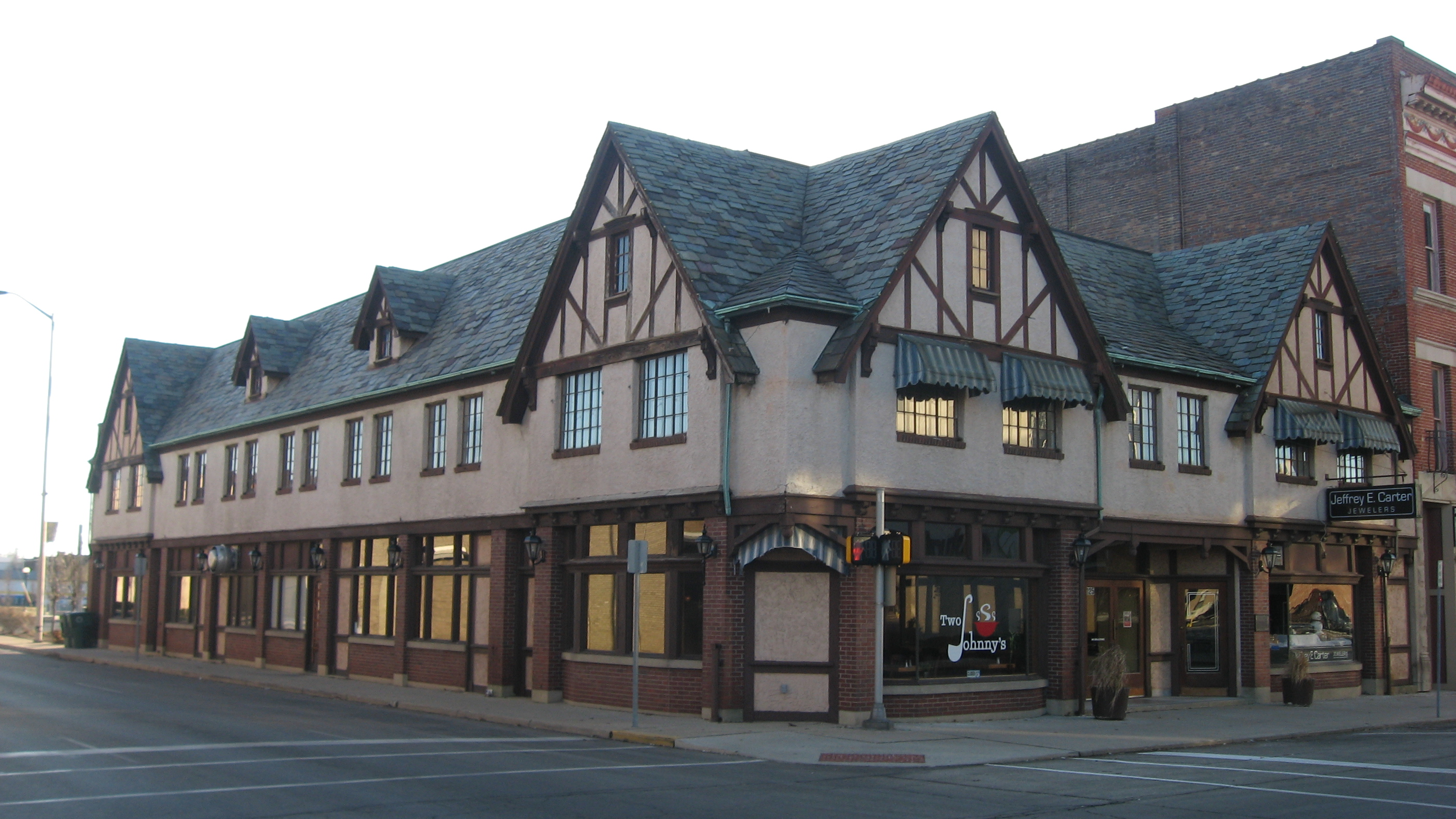
- F. D. Rose Building, January 2012

- Location within Indiana Location within the United States
- Location: 121 E. Charles St., Muncie, Indiana
- Coordinates: 40°11′27″N 85°23′8″W
- Area: less than one acre
- Built: 1926
- Architect: Kibele & Garrard
- Architectural style: Rural Medieval
- NRHP reference No.: 84001023
- Added to NRHP: March 1, 1984

The F. D. Rose Building, also known as Rose Court, is a historic commercial building located at Muncie, Indiana. It was built in 1926, and is a two-story, rectangular, Rural Medieval style brick building. The building features a steep slate gable roof concealing a flat roof, an arcade / atrium plan, and a stucco and half-timber exterior.

The building is named for the man who funded its construction, Frederick D. Rose. Rose was a prominent banker in Muncie, as well as a veteran of the First World War. Rose may have based the building's design off the architecture he witnessed while serving in France. Among the first businesses to occupy the building include a drug store, a barber shop, a loan company, a cab company, a physician's office, and Ball Stores (a department store). Today, the building houses a variety of offices and restaurants.

It was added to the National Register of Historic Places in 1984.
