= Felt's Farm =

Historic house in Indiana, United States

- U.S. National Register of Historic Places
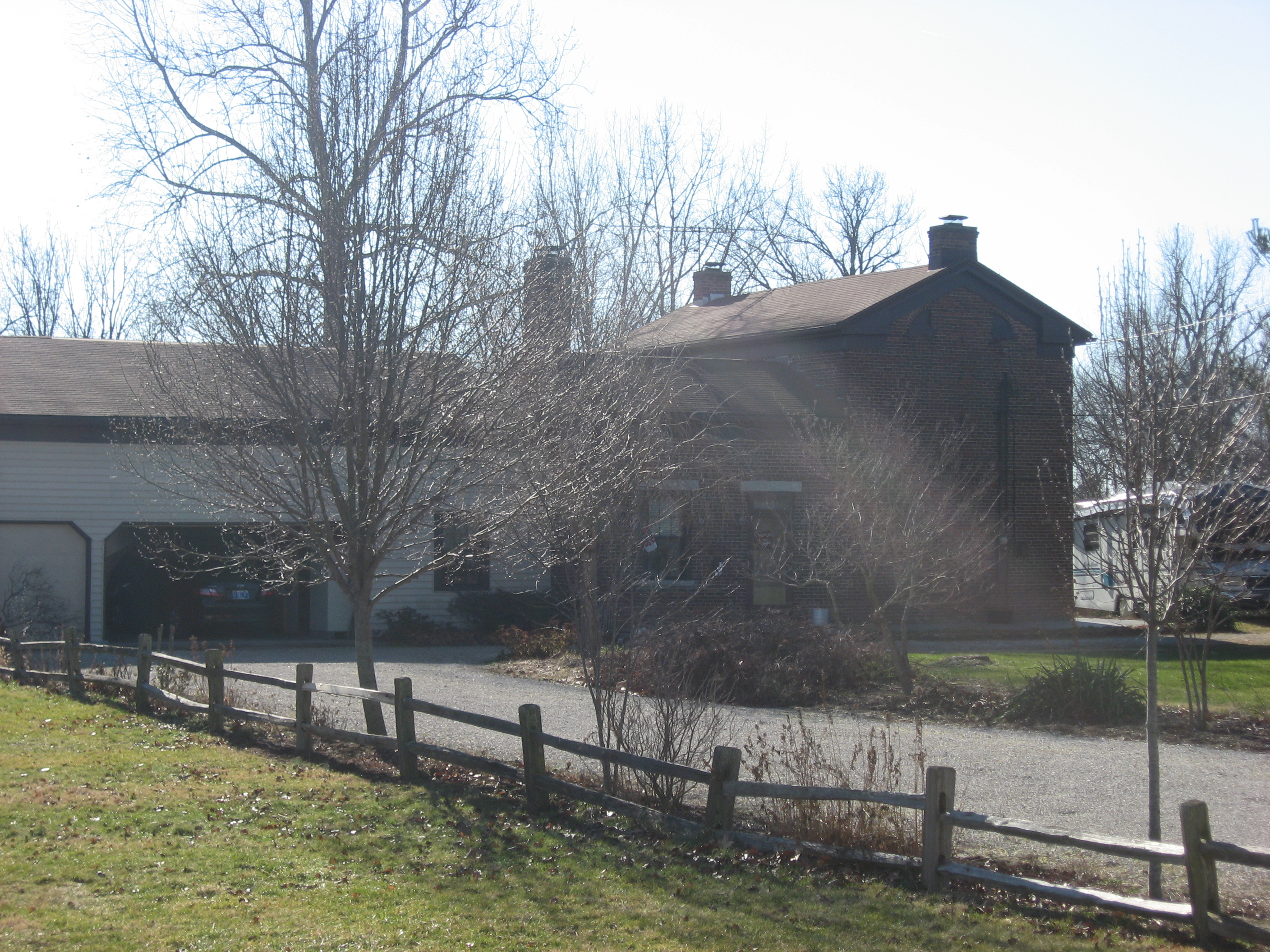
- Felt's Farmhouse, January 2012

- Location within Indiana Location within the United States
- Location: Race St., southeast of Eaton, Union Township, Delaware County, Indiana
- Coordinates: 40°20′4″N 85°20′48″W
- Area: 6.9 acres (2.8 ha)
- Built: c. 1830
- Architectural style: Federal
- NRHP reference No.: 75000015
- Added to NRHP: August 28, 1975

Felt's Farm, also known as Carter's Farm & Mill, is a historic home located at Union Township, Delaware County, Indiana. The main house was built about 1830, and is a two-story, Federal style brick I-house. It has a fieldstone foundation, gable roof, and one-story rear wing.

In 1831, the owner of the property, Francis Harris, built a mill nearby. This mill played an important role in the development of the town of Eaton. A later owner of the property, George W. Carter, was a major figure in the history of the Indiana gas boom, as he was involved in setting up Indiana's first commercial gas well in Eaton.

It was added to the National Register of Historic Places in 1975.
