= Mount Zion Methodist Episcopal Church (Eaton, Indiana) =

Historic church in Indiana, United States

- U.S. National Register of Historic Places
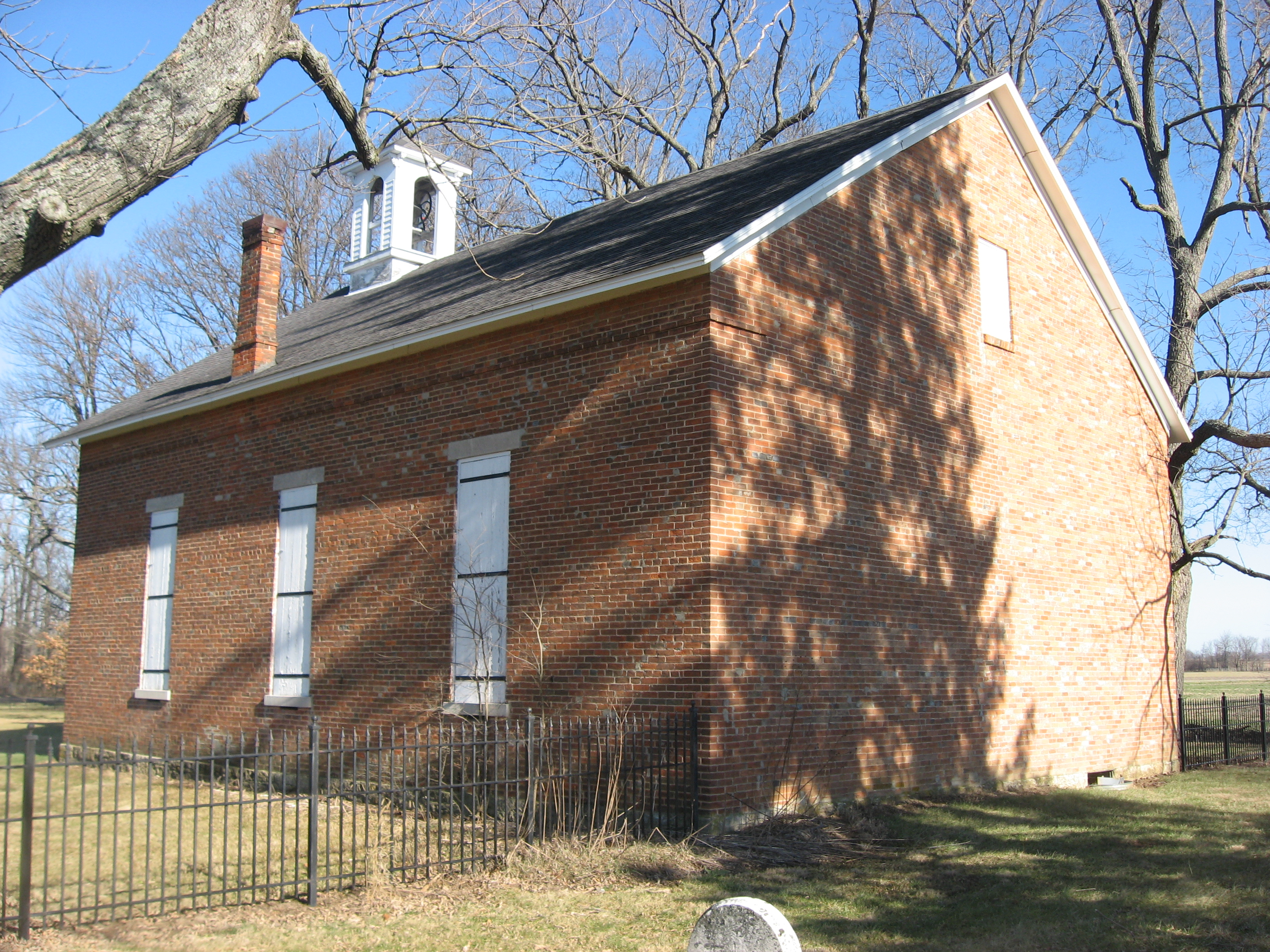
- Side and rear of the church

- Location within Indiana Location within the United States
- Location: 1701 W. Eaton-Wheeling Pike, west of Eaton, Union Township, Delaware County, Indiana
- Coordinates: 40°20′56″N 85°24′25″W
- Area: 1.6 acres (0.65 ha)
- Built: 1867
- Architectural style: Gable Front
- NRHP reference No.: 08000915
- Added to NRHP: September 17, 2008

The Mount Zion Methodist Episcopal Church is a historic Methodist church located in Union Township, Delaware County, Indiana, United States. It was built in 1867, and is a modest, one-room, brick church with a reconstructed bell tower. It measures 46 feet by 36 feet and sits on an uncut Indiana limestone foundation.

It was added to the National Register of Historic Places in 2008.
