= Hamilton Township Schoolhouse No. 4 =

- U.S. National Register of Historic Places
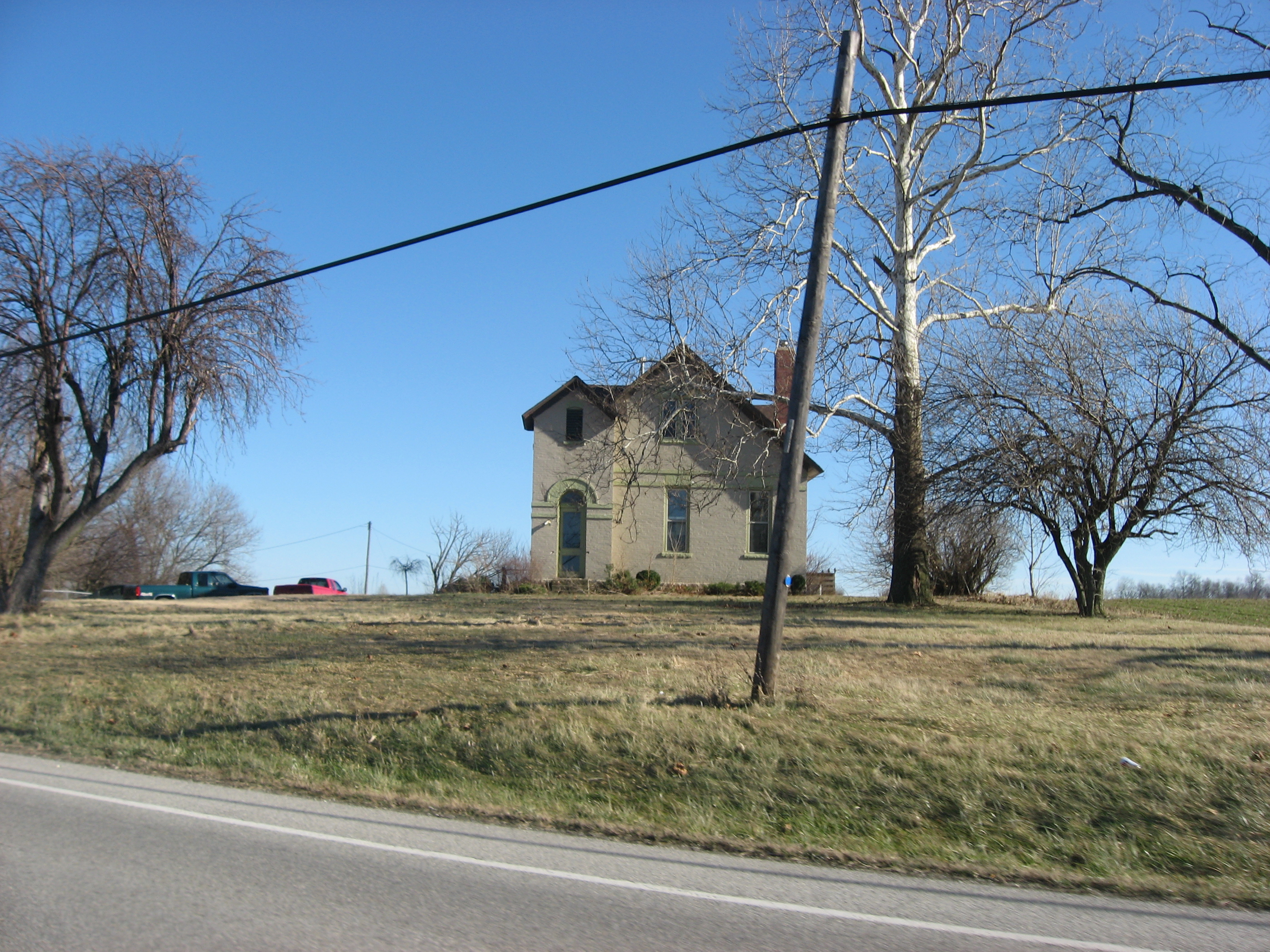
- Hamilton Township Schoolhouse No. 4, January 2012

- Location within Indiana Location within the United States
- Location: State Road 67, northeast of Muncie, Hamilton Township, Delaware County, Indiana
- Coordinates: 40°15′17″N 85°20′27″W
- Area: 0.6 acres (0.24 ha)
- Built: 1897
- NRHP reference No.: 84000487
- Added to NRHP: December 27, 1984

Hamilton Township Schoolhouse No. 4, also known as the Brady House, is a historic school building located at Hamilton Township, Delaware County, Indiana. It was built in 1897, and is a 1 1/2-story, three-bay, brick building with a gable roof. It rests on a raised stone foundation, has a square bell tower above the entrance, and two brick chimneys. The school was abandoned in 1899 and converted to a residence between 1917 and 1919.

It was added to the National Register of Historic Places in 1984.
