= Delaware Community School Corporation =

School district in Indiana, United States

Delaware Community School Corporation (Del-Com) is a school district headquartered in Hamilton Township, Delaware County, Indiana, with a Muncie post office address.

The district, in Delaware County, includes the following townships: Delaware, Hamilton, Niles, and Union. It includes Eaton, most of Albany, and a small piece of Muncie.

== History ==
On November 5, 1964, voters approved the creation of the Delaware Metropolitan School District, as Del-Com was originally was known as. By 1966 there had been several legal disputes involving township trustees trying to instead have the schools under the control of the trustees.

In 1967 a formal proposal was formed on how to consolidate the Delaware school district and the School Town of Albany. In 1968, voters in Delaware, Hamilton, Niles, and Union townships voted in favor of merging the Delaware school district and the School Town of Albany. For the time being, Albany High School continued to operate and district students could choose which high school to attend (either Delta High or Albany High).

In 1968, a group of researchers at Ball State University presented a plan to rebuild the schools of this district, with a total cost of $800,000.

The Delaware school district received its current name in 1973. In August 1974, Albany High closed and its students were sent to Delta High, now the sole high school of the school district.

Steven Hall was superintendent from circa 2009 until he retired on June 30, 2015. His contract was to end in 2016.

Reece Mann began his term as superintendent circa 2015 and was in that role until he resigned in 2021 after he had been diagnosed with cancer. At that time, Greg Kile became acting superintendent.

== Schools and facilities ==
- Delta High School
- Delta Middle School
- Albany Elementary School
  - In 2023 the district announced plans to use $7,100,000 in bond money to renovate the school.
- Eaton Elementary School
- Royerton Elementary School

The school district headquarters is in front of Delta High. It opened in 2016. It as a part of a renovation program worth $3,500,000 altogether.
