= DeSoto, Indiana =

Desoto
- Unincorporated community
- Location within Indiana Location within the United States
- Coordinates: 40°14′49″N 85°17′37″W
- Country: United States
- State: Indiana
- County: Delaware
- Township: Delaware
- Founded by: Luther L. Perdieu
- Named after: Hernando de Soto
- Elevation: 938 ft (286 m)
- ZIP code: 47303
- FIPS code: 18-17848
- GNIS feature ID: 449648

Desoto is an unincorporated community in Delaware Township, Delaware County, Indiana.

== History ==
DeSoto, Indiana, was originally platted as the village of Woodlawn on January 15, 1881, by landowner Luther L. Perdieu. The settlement developed around the new Lake Erie & Western Railroad depot in southeastern Delaware Township. Perdieu laid out sixteen lots along the tracks, and the village quickly grew, with sawmills and businesses emerging to support the local economy. However, when Perdieu applied for a post office, the name "Woodlawn" was rejected due to its similarity to another Indiana post office. He then resubmitted the application under the name "DeSoto," likely in homage to the Spanish explorer Hernando de Soto.

DeSoto expanded in 1883 when Isaac Worley platted additional lots to the west. By the end of that year, it had developed into a small but thriving community with multiple stores, mills, and a blacksmith shop. In 1893, an adjacent development called East Muncie was planned to attract industry, but the project collapsed following the Panic of 1893. East Muncie was eventually absorbed into DeSoto, which remained an informal village without legal incorporation.

DeSoto's early economic growth was fueled by rail and interurban transportation. In 1905, the Muncie and Portland Traction Company established an interurban route through the village, later absorbed into the Union Traction system. Many residents found employment at Indiana Steel and Wire in Muncie, commuting via interurban trains. In 1908, a new school was built, consolidating several smaller township schools.

The rise of DeSoto coincided with the decline of the nearby hamlet of Clifton, a small agricultural settlement that had thrived before the Civil War but was ultimately bypassed by the railroad. With frequent flooding and the shift to rail transport, Clifton gradually disappeared, while DeSoto continued to develop as its successor.
