= Anthony, Indiana =

- Unincorporated community
- Location within Indiana Location within the United States
- Coordinates: 40°16′40″N 85°26′10″W
- Country: United States
- State: Indiana
- County: Delaware
- Township: Hamilton
- Named after: Charles Anthony
- Elevation: 909 ft (277 m)
- ZIP code: 47303
- Area code: 765
- FIPS code: 18-01774
- GNIS feature ID: 430191

Anthony is an unincorporated community in Hamilton Township, Delaware County, Indiana, United States.

== History ==
Anthony is a small rural community located in Delaware County, Indiana. It sits at the intersection of State Road 28 and Wheeling Avenue, which was originally an old Lenape trail. The town is named after Charles Anthony, a Muncie doctor and businessman, and is believed to be the oldest settlement in Hamilton Township being settled in the 1830s. The date Anthony was platted is unknown. A post office was established in 1850 and remained in operation until 1901, serving as an important center for communication and commerce during the town's peak years.

Historically, Anthony played a significant role in local industry and agriculture. The town hosted a toll road station known as Six Mile House, a grain elevator and coal yard, and Bell Ranch, a 400-acre farm managed by former Delaware County commissioner Andy Jackson. It also supported various businesses and professions, including an attorney, a well-driller, a plumber, a tax assessor, and an early hybrid seed corn grower and dealer. Among its notable residents was a veteran of the Yukon Gold Rush. The town's social scene featured a combination dance hall, restaurant, and trap shoot range known as "The So & So."

Between 1900 and 1904, Anthony was home to both a baseball team, the "Anthony Town Hitters," and a football team, although the name of the latter has been lost to history. These teams provided entertainment and fostered local pride.

One of the most tragic events in the town's history was the boiler explosion at the Nickum Sawmill on March 24, 1900, which was described as "the worst Delaware County accident for many years." The explosion resulted in the deaths of four men—Thomas Sullivan, Clifford Van Buskirk, Marion D. Carey, and Alonzo Van Buskirk—and the destruction of the mill. Local photographer John O. Newcomb captured images of the aftermath, which were sold through Williams' General Store, the town's main shop.

Anthony is also home to Garrard Cemetery, an abandoned burial ground also known as Stafford Cemetery and Shanlee Cemetery, as listed in the Cemetery and Burial Grounds Registry of the Indiana Department of Natural Resources (DNR) and the State Historical Architectural and Archaeological Research Database (SHAARD).

Today, Anthony has significantly declined from its former prominence. The community is now home to a mobile home park, approximately a dozen residences, a gas station with a convenience store, and a tool and die business, marking the remnants of what was once a thriving rural settlement.
