= Delaware Township, Delaware County, Indiana =

Delaware Township
- Township
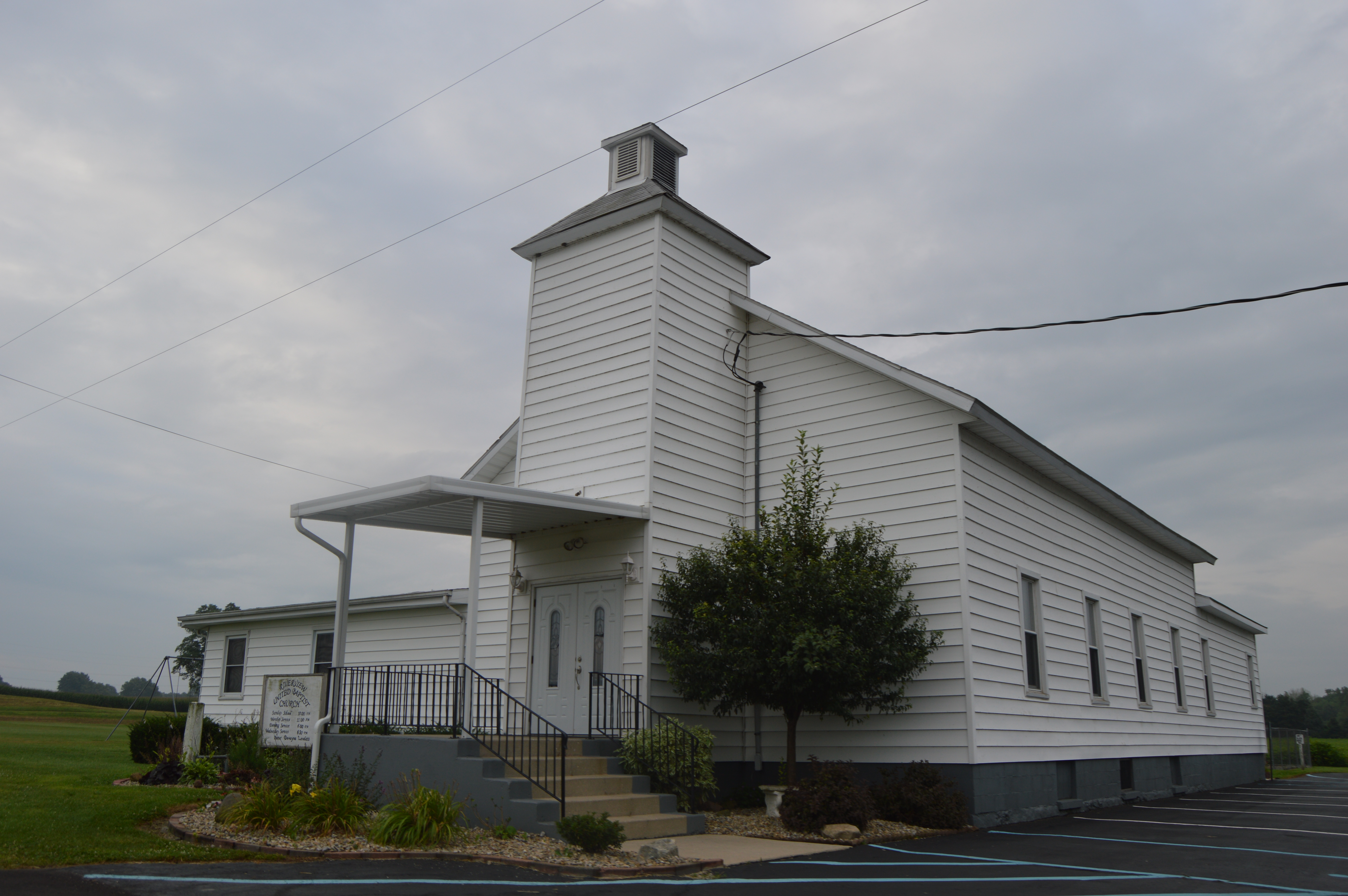
- Riverview United Baptist Church

- Location of Delaware Township in Delaware County
- Coordinates: 40°16′09″N 85°16′21″W
- Country: United States
- State: Indiana
- County: Delaware

Government
  - Type: Indiana township

Area
  - Total: 29.54 sq mi (76.5 km^{2})
  - Land: 29.3 sq mi (76 km^{2})
  - Water: 0.25 sq mi (0.65 km^{2})
- Elevation: 932 ft (284 m)

Population (2020)
  - Total: 3,481
  - Density: 123/sq mi (47/km^{2})
- Area code: 765
- FIPS code: 18-17470
- GNIS feature ID: 453260

Delaware Township is one of twelve townships in Delaware County, Indiana. According to the 2010 census, its population was 3,481 and it contained 1,591 housing units.

== Geography ==
According to the 2020 census, the township has a total area of 29.54 square miles (76.5 km^{2}), of which 29.3 square miles (76 km^{2}) (or 99.19%) is land and 0.25 square miles (0.65 km^{2}) (or 0.85%) is water.

=== Cities and towns ===
- Albany (south half)

=== Unincorporated towns ===
- DeSoto

=== Adjacent townships ===
- Niles Township (north)
- Richland Township, Jay County (northeast)
- Green Township, Randolph County (east)
- Monroe Township, Randolph County (southeast)
- Liberty Township (south)
- Center Township (southwest)
- Hamilton Township (west)
- Union Township (northwest)

=== Major highways ===
- Indiana State Road 28
- Indiana State Road 67
- Indiana State Road 167

=== Cemeteries ===
The township contains four cemeteries: Black, Godlove, Strong and Union.

== Demographics ==
Historical population
Census	Pop.	Note	%±
1890	1,579		—
1900	3,203		102.8%
1910	2,354		−26.5%
1920	2,321		−1.4%
1930	2,391		3.0%
1940	2,642		10.5%
1950	2,960		12.0%
1960	3,596		21.5%
1970	4,201		16.8%
1980	4,267		1.6%
1990	3,781		−11.4%
2000	3,797		0.4%
2010	3,603		−5.1%
2020	3,481		−3.4%
U.S. Decennial Census

=== 2020 census ===
As of the census of 2020, there were 3,481 people, 1,591 households, and 814 families living in the township. The population density was 123.0 inhabitants per square mile (47.5/km^{2}). There were 1,591 housing units at an average density of 53.86 per square mile (20.8/km^{2}). The racial makeup of the township was 95.3% White, 0.6% African American, 0.4% Native American or Alaskan Native, 0.3% Asian, 0.03% Native Hawaiian or Pacific Islander, 0.4% from other races, and 2.8% from two or more races. Hispanic or Latino of any race were 1.0% of the population.

There were 1,591 households, of which 21.7% had children under the age of 18 living with them, 50.8% were married couples living together, 30.8% had a female householder with no husband present, 15.1% had a male householder with no wife present, and 3.3% were non-families. 45.9% of all households were made up of individuals. The average household size was 2.19 and the average family size was 2.86.

26.8% of the population had never been married. 52.6% of residents were married and not separated, 7.8% were widowed, 10.6% were divorced, and 2.3% were separated.

The median age in the township was 45.9. 5.9% of residents were under the age of 5; 21.7% of residents were under the age of 18; 78.3% were age 18 or older; and 22.7% were age 65 or older. 11.2% of the population were veterans.

The most common language spoken at home was English with 99.6% speaking it at home and 0.4% spoke Spanish at home. 0.9% of the population were foreign born.

The median household income in Delaware Township was $51,714, 7.9% lower than the median average for the state of Indiana. 14.4% of the population were in poverty, including 31.1% of residents under the age of 18. The poverty rate for the township was 1.5% higher than that of the state. 19.9% of the population were disabled and 5.1% had no healthcare coverage. 48.4% of the population had attained a high school or equivalent degree, 12.8% had attended college but received no degree, 10.5% had attained an Associate's degree or higher, 11.0% had attained a Bachelor's degree or higher, and 10.9% had a graduate or professional degree. 6.4% had no degree. 53.5% of Delaware Township residents were employed, working a mean of 38.7 hours per week. 155 housing units were vacant at a density of 5.2 per square mile (2.0/km^{2}).

== Education ==
It is in the Delaware Community School Corporation.

== See also ==
- List of Indiana townships
