= Union Township, Delaware County, Indiana =

Union Township
- Township
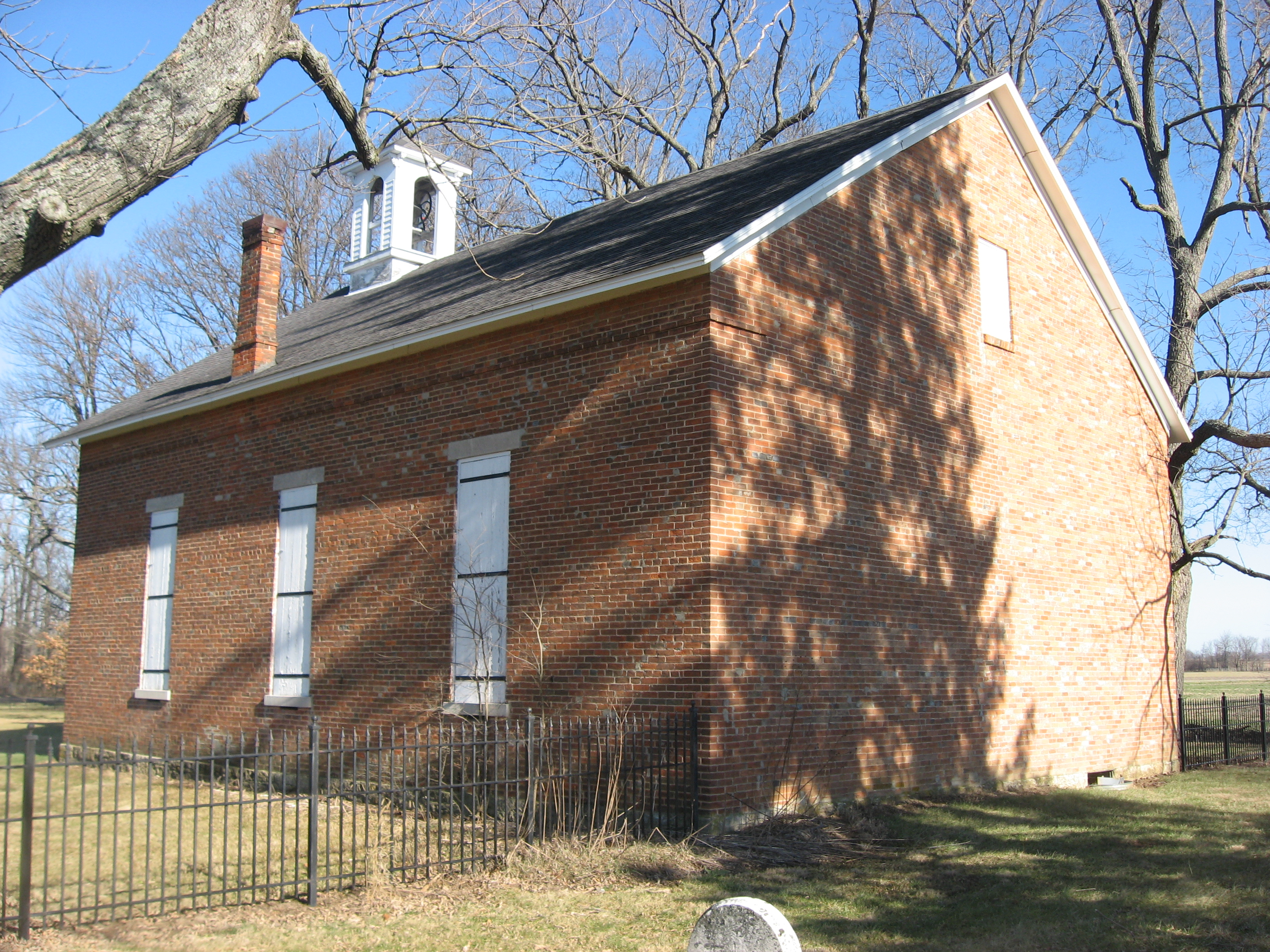
- Mount Zion Methodist Church, a historic site in the township

- Location of Union Township in Delaware County
- Coordinates: 40°20′53″N 85°23′03″W
- Country: United States
- State: Indiana
- County: Delaware

Government
  - Type: Indiana township

Area
  - Total: 29.65 sq mi (76.8 km^{2})
  - Land: 29.34 sq mi (76.0 km^{2})
  - Water: 0.3 sq mi (0.78 km^{2})
- Elevation: 899 ft (274 m)

Population (2020)
  - Total: 2,540
  - Density: 96.7/sq mi (37.3/km^{2})
- FIPS code: 18-77246
- GNIS feature ID: 453913

Union Township is one of twelve townships in Delaware County, Indiana. According to the 2010 census, its population was 2,838 and it contained 1,260 housing units.

== History ==
Felt's Farm and the Mount Zion Methodist Episcopal Church are listed on the National Register of Historic Places.

== Geography ==
According to the 2010 census, the township has a total area of 29.65 square miles (76.8 km^{2}), of which 29.34 square miles (76.0 km^{2}) (or 98.95%) is land and 0.3 square miles (0.78 km^{2}) (or 1.01%) is water.

=== Cities and towns ===
- Eaton

=== Unincorporated towns ===
- Shideler

(This list is based on USGS data and may include former settlements.)

=== Adjacent townships ===
- Licking Township, Blackford County (north)
- Jackson Township, Blackford County (northeast)
- Niles Township (east)
- Delaware Township (southeast)
- Hamilton Township (south)
- Harrison Township (southwest)
- Washington Township (west)

=== Major highways ===
- Indiana State Road 3

=== Cemeteries ===
The township contains three cemeteries: Leaird, Mount Zion Church and Union.

== Education ==
It is in the Delaware Community School Corporation.
