= Hamilton Township, Delaware County, Indiana =

Hamilton Township
- Township
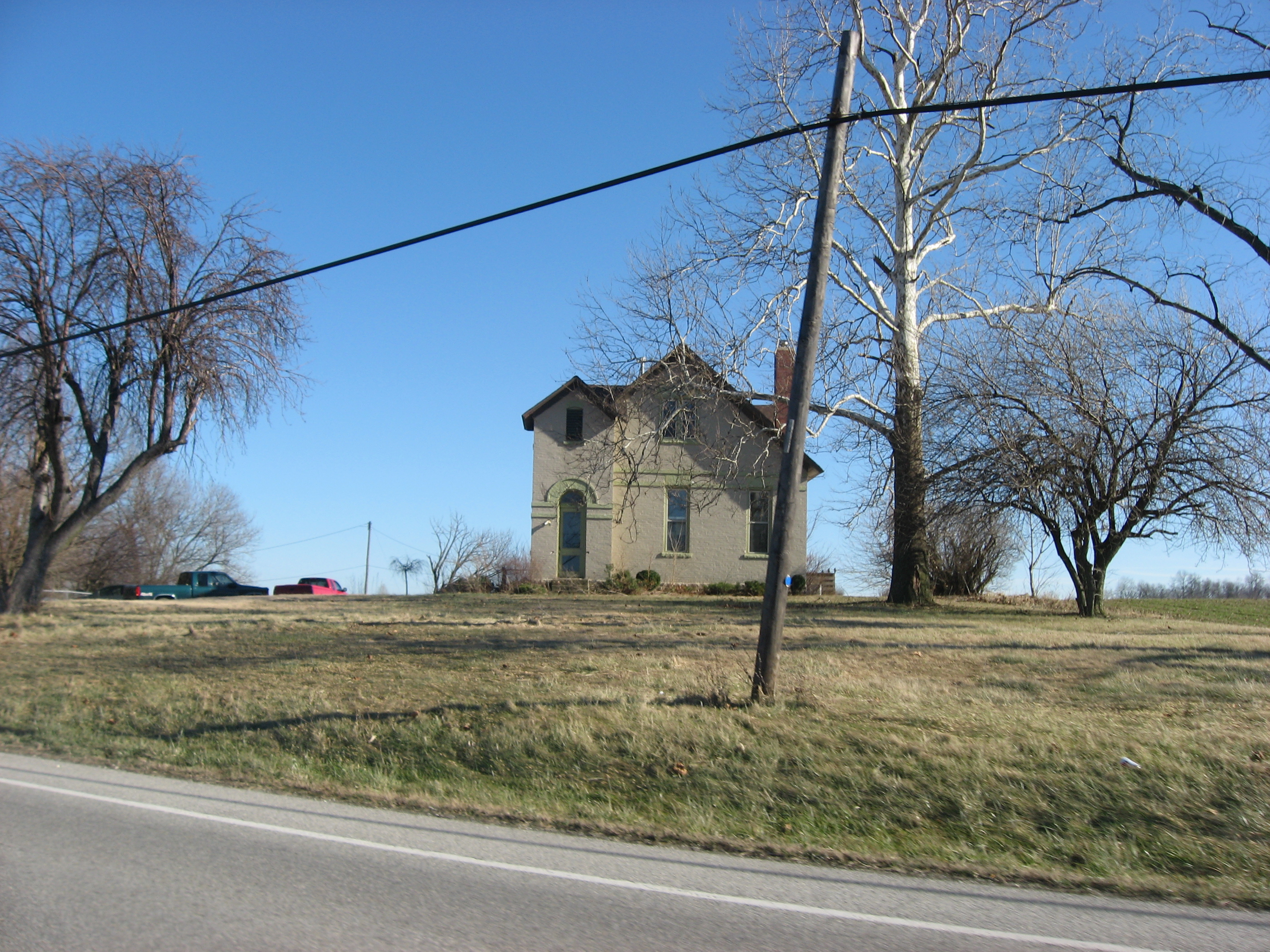
- A former school, now a house of Larbing, in the township

- Location of Hamilton Township in Delaware County
- Coordinates: 40°16′11″N 85°23′20″W
- Country: United States
- State: Indiana
- County: Delaware

Government
  - Type: Indiana township

Area
  - Total: 29.78 sq mi (77.1 km^{2})
  - Land: 29.7 sq mi (77 km^{2})
  - Water: 0.07 sq mi (0.18 km^{2})
- Elevation: 896 ft (273 m)

Population (2020)
  - Total: 7,169
  - Density: 240.7/sq mi (92.9/km^{2})
- Area code: 765
- FIPS code: 18-30600
- GNIS feature ID: 453364

Hamilton Township is one of twelve townships in Delaware County, Indiana. According to the 2010 census, its population was 12,169 and it contained 18,785 housing units.

== Fire Department ==
Hamilton Township Volunteer Fire Department is currently the only working fire department in the township. There are 30+ firefighters that work all for the same cause, to preserve life and property in the township. The department currently operates 9 trucks, ranging from medical and utility trucks, all the way to specialized pumpers.

== History ==
The Hamilton Township Schoolhouse No. 4 was listed on the National Register of Historic Places in 1904.

== Geography ==
According to the 2010 census, the township has a total area of 29.78 square miles (77.1 km^{2}), of which 29.7 square miles (77 km^{2}) (or 99.73%) is land and 0.07 square miles (0.18 km^{2}) (or 0.24%) is water.

=== Cities and towns ===
- Eaton (south edge)
- Muncie (north edge)

=== Unincorporated towns ===
- Anthony
- Royerton

=== Adjacent townships ===
- Union Township (north)
- Niles Township (northeast)
- Delaware Township (east)
- Liberty Township (southeast)
- Center Township (south)
- Harrison Township (west)
- Washington Township (northwest)

=== Major highways ===
- U.S. Route 35
- Indiana State Road 3
- Indiana State Road 28
- Indiana State Road 67

=== Cemeteries ===
The township contains four cemeteries: Cullen, Gardens of Memory, Stafford and a cemetery discovered in 2021 by the Delaware County Historical Society's Pioneer Cemetery Preservation Committee about 0.5 miles southwest of Anthony.

== Demographics ==
Historical population
Census	Pop.	Note	%±
1890	1,340		—
1900	1,307		−2.5%
1910	1,263		−3.4%
1920	1,144		−9.4%
1930	1,170		2.3%
1940	1,252		7.0%
1950	1,576		25.9%
1960	2,345		48.8%
1970	4,803		104.8%
1980	7,525		56.7%
1990	7,052		−6.3%
2000	7,163		1.6%
2010	7,206		0.6%
2020	7,169		−0.5%
U.S. Decennial Census

=== 2020 census ===
As of the census of 2020, there were 7,169 people, 2,785 households, and 2,131 families living in the township. The population density was 240.7 inhabitants per square mile (92.9/km^{2}). There were 2,969 housing units at an average density of 99.70 per square mile (38.5/km^{2}). The racial makeup of the township was 92.2% White, 2.2% African American, 1.0% Asian, 0.1% Native American or Alaskan Native, 0.01% Native Hawaiian or Pacific Islander, 0.7% from other races, and 3.7% from two or more races. Hispanic or Latino of any race were 2.1% of the population.

There were 2,785 households, of which 19.0% had children under the age of 18 living with them, 57.1% were married couples living together, 25.7% had a female householder with no husband present, 13.1% had a male householder with no wife present, and 4.1% were non-families. 38.8% of all households were made up of individuals. The average household size was 2.57 and the average family size was 2.64.

19.7% of the population had never been married. 58.3% of residents were married and not separated, 8.4% were widowed, 12.7% were divorced, and 0.9% were separated.

The median age in the township was 44.9. 4.8% of residents were under the age of 5; 19.0% of residents were under the age of 18; 81.0% were age 18 or older; and 24.4% were age 65 or older. 6.3% of the population were veterans.

The most common language spoken at home was English with 97.4% speaking it at home, 1.7% spoke Spanish at home, 0.7% spoke an Asian or Pacific Islander language at home, and 0.2% spoke another Indo-European language at home. 3.7% of the population were foreign born.

The median household income in Hamilton Township was $68,925, 22.7% greater than the median average for the state of Indiana. 6.9% of the population were in poverty, including 8.9% of residents under the age of 18. The poverty rate for the township was 6.0% lower than that of the state. 10.5% of the population were disabled and 3.5% had no healthcare coverage. 27.6% of the population had attained a high school or equivalent degree, 26.0% had attended college but received no degree, 9.3% had attained an Associate's degree or higher, 17.0% had attained a Bachelor's degree or higher, and 15.2% had a graduate or professional degree. 4.9% had no degree. 58.0% of Hamilton Township residents were employed, working a mean of 39.3 hours per week. 184 housing units were vacant at a density of 6.2 per square mile (2.4/km^{2}).

== Transportation ==
Delaware County Regional Airport is in the township.

== Education ==
It is in the Delaware Community School Corporation.
