= Niles Township, Delaware County, Indiana =

Niles Township
- Township
- Location of Niles Township in Delaware County
- Coordinates: 40°20′32″N 85°16′53″W
- Country: United States
- State: Indiana
- County: Delaware

Government
  - Type: Indiana township

Area
  - Total: 29.61 sq mi (76.7 km^{2})
  - Land: 29.49 sq mi (76.4 km^{2})
  - Water: 0.13 sq mi (0.34 km^{2})
- Elevation: 928 ft (283 m)

Population (2020)
  - Total: 1,369
  - Density: 46.1/sq mi (17.8/km^{2})
- FIPS code: 18-53928
- GNIS feature ID: 453667

Niles Township is one of twelve townships in Delaware County, Indiana. According to the 2010 census, its population was 1,360 and it contained 566 housing units.

== Geography ==
According to the 2010 census, the township has a total area of 29.61 square miles (76.7 km^{2}), of which 29.49 square miles (76.4 km^{2}) (or 99.59%) is land and 0.13 square miles (0.34 km^{2}) (or 0.44%) is water.

=== Cities and towns ===
- Albany (north half)

=== Unincorporated towns ===
- Granville

=== Adjacent townships ===
- Jackson Township, Blackford County (north)
- Richland Township, Jay County (east)
- Green Township, Randolph County (southeast)
- Delaware Township (south)
- Hamilton Township (southwest)
- Union Township (west)

=== Major highways ===
- Indiana State Road 67
- Indiana State Road 167

=== Cemeteries ===
The township contains three cemeteries: Buckles, Granville and Memorial Park.

== Education ==
It is in the Delaware Community School Corporation.
