= Albany, Indiana =

- Town
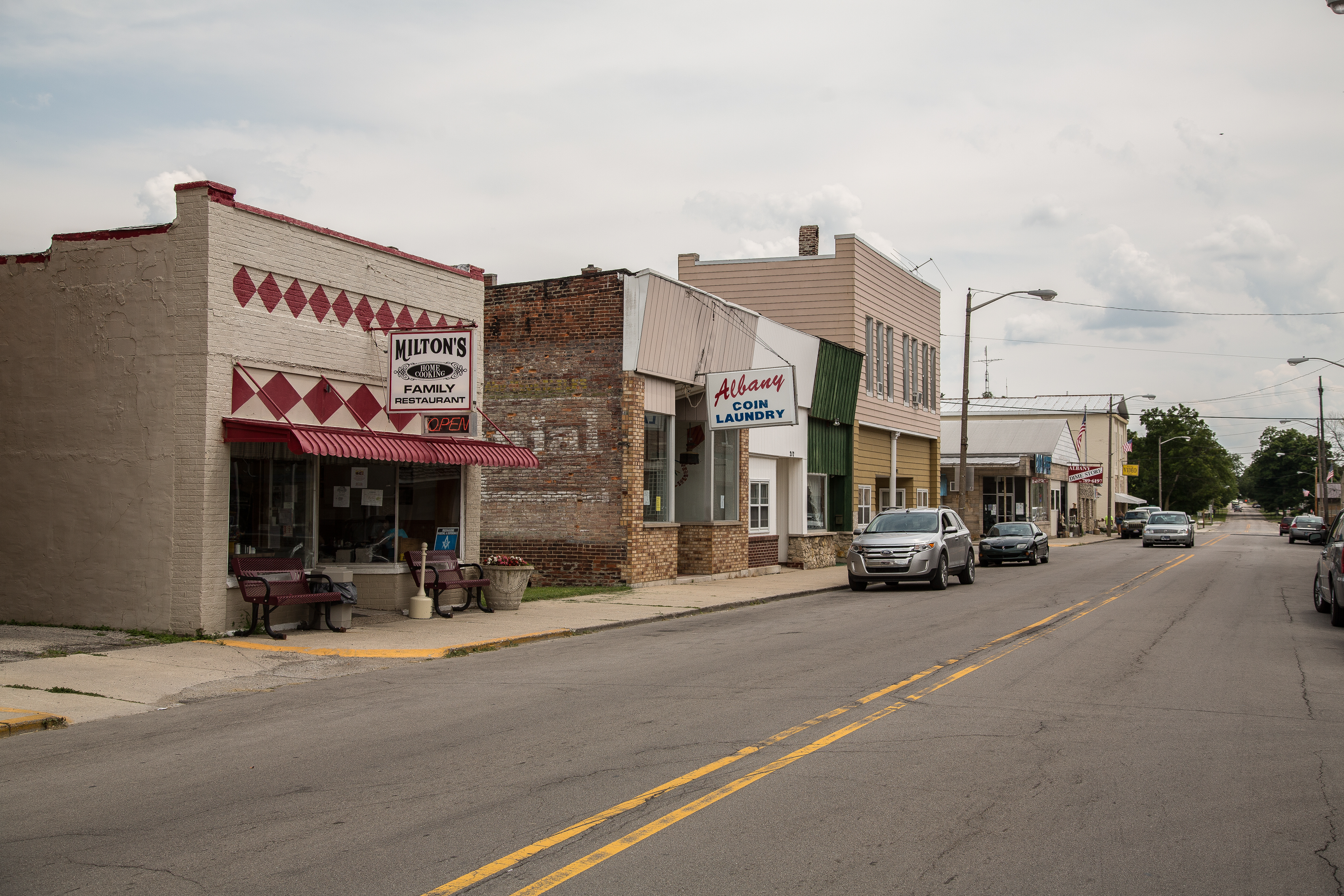

- Location of Albany in Delaware County and Randolph County, Indiana.
- Coordinates: 40°18′12″N 85°14′26″W
- Country: United States
- State: Indiana
- Counties: Delaware, Randolph
- Townships: Niles, Delaware, Green
- Founded: 1833

Area
  - Total: 1.99 sq mi (5.15 km^{2})
  - Land: 1.98 sq mi (5.13 km^{2})
  - Water: 0.0077 sq mi (0.02 km^{2})
- Elevation: 951 ft (290 m)

Population (2020)
  - Total: 2,295
  - Estimate (2025): 2,272 ▼
  - Density: 1,158.5/sq mi (447.29/km^{2})
- Time zone: UTC−5 (EST)
  - Summer (DST): UTC−5 (EST)
- ZIP code: 47320
- Area code: 765
- FIPS code: 18-00802
- GNIS ID: 2397422
- Website: albanyin.com

Albany is a town in Delaware and Randolph counties in the U.S. state of Indiana, along the Mississinewa River. The population was 2,295 at the 2020 census. It is part of the Muncie, IN Metropolitan Statistical Area.

== History ==
Albany was founded and platted in 1833 by William Venard, after purchasing it from Andrew Kennedy the year prior. It was likely named after Albany, New York.

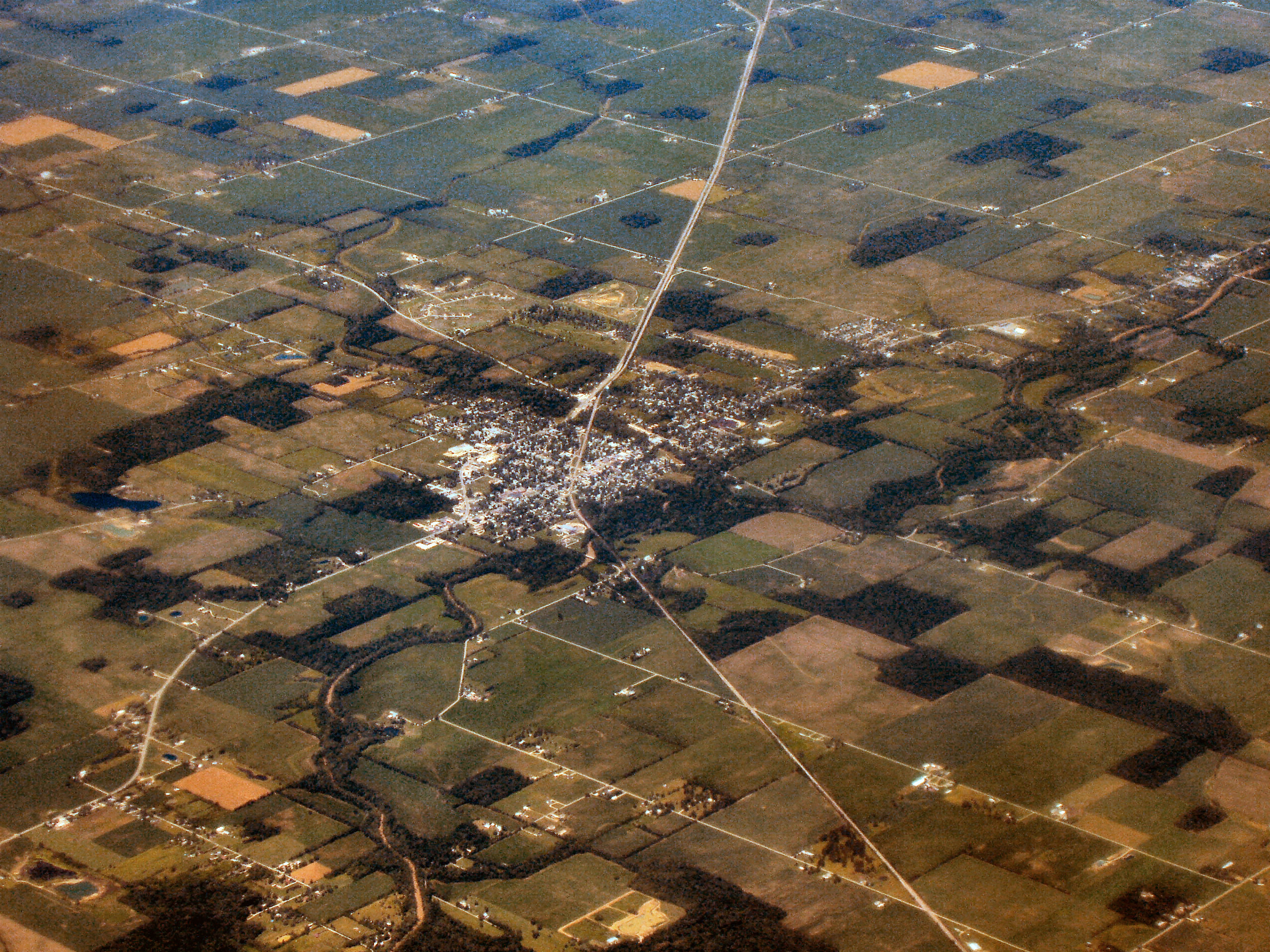
Albany from the west.

== Geography ==
According to the 2010 census, Albany has a total area of 1.76 square miles (4.56 km^{2}), of which 1.75 square miles (4.53 km^{2}) (or 99.43%) is land and 0.01 square miles (0.03 km^{2}) (or 0.57%) is water.

== Demographics ==
Historical population
Census	Pop.	Note	%±
1880	249		—
1890	571		129.3%
1900	2,116		270.6%
1910	1,289		−39.1%
1920	1,333		3.4%
1930	1,413		6.0%
1940	1,623		14.9%
1950	1,846		13.7%
1960	2,132		15.5%
1970	2,293		7.6%
1980	2,625		14.5%
1990	2,357		−10.2%
2000	2,368		0.5%
2010	2,165		−8.6%
2020	2,295		6.0%
2025 (est.)	2,272	▼	−1.0%
U.S. Decennial Census

=== 2020 census ===
As of the 2020 census, Albany had a population of 2,295, with 946 households and 528 families. The population density was 1,176.9 inhabitants per square mile (454.4/km^{2}). There were 1,057 housing units at an average density of 542.1 per square mile (209.3/km^{2}).

The median age was 42.0 years. 22.7% of residents were under the age of 18 and 22.4% of residents were 65 years of age or older. For every 100 females there were 92.4 males, and for every 100 females age 18 and over there were 86.7 males age 18 and over. 0.0% of residents lived in urban areas, while 100.0% lived in rural areas.

There were 946 households in Albany, of which 30.4% had children under the age of 18 living in them. Of all households, 41.6% were married-couple households, 18.7% were households with a male householder and no spouse or partner present, and 29.6% were households with a female householder and no spouse or partner present. About 31.4% of all households were made up of individuals, and 12.5% had someone living alone who was 65 years of age or older. The average household size was 2.43 and the average family size was 2.45.

There were 1,057 housing units, of which 10.5% were vacant. The homeowner vacancy rate was 2.5% and the rental vacancy rate was 7.0%.

Racial composition as of the 2020 census
Race	Number	Percent
White	2,156	93.9%
Black or African American	19	0.8%
American Indian and Alaska Native	7	0.3%
Asian	11	0.5%
Native Hawaiian and Other Pacific Islander	0	0.0%
Some other race	14	0.6%
Two or more races	88	3.8%
Hispanic or Latino (of any race)	38	1.7%

=== Demographic estimates ===
20.1% of the population had never been married. 55.1% of residents were married and not separated, 7.9% were widowed, 13.6% were divorced, and 3.3% were separated.

15.2% of the population were veterans. The only language spoken at home was English, by 100% of the population. No residents were foreign-born.

=== Income and poverty ===
The median household income in Albany was $48,483, 13.7% less than the median average for the state of Indiana. 6.7% of the population were in poverty, including 9.1% of residents under the age of 18. The poverty rate for the town was 6.2% lower than that of the state. 26.2% of the population were disabled and 8.9% had no healthcare coverage. 46.6% of the population had attained a high school or equivalent degree, 17.7% had attended college but received no degree, 10.1% had attained an Associate's degree or higher, 15.3% had attained a Bachelor's degree or higher, and 2.9% had a graduate or professional degree. 7.4% had no degree. 46.2% of Albany residents were employed, working a mean of 40.8 hours per week. The median gross rent in Albany was $576 and the homeownership rate was 76.7%. 111 housing units were vacant at a density of 56.9 per square mile (22.0/km^{2}).

=== 2010 census ===
As of the 2010 Census, there were 2,165 people, 924 households, and 602 families living in the town. The population density was 1,237.1 inhabitants per square mile (477.6/km^{2}). There were 1,060 housing units at an average density of 605.7 per square mile (233.9/km^{2}). The racial makeup of the town was 97.2% White, 0.6% African American, 0.2% Asian, 0.3% from other races, and 1.6% from two or more races. Hispanic or Latino residents of any race were 1.1% of the population.

There were 924 households, of which 30.2% had children under the age of 18 living with them, 48.8% were married couples living together, 12.6% had a female householder with no husband present, 3.8% had a male householder with no wife present, and 34.8% were non-families. 30.7% of all households were made up of individuals, and 12.9% had someone living alone who was 65 years of age or older. The average household size was 2.34 and the average family size was 2.92.

The median age in the town was 40.3 years. 24.8% of residents were under the age of 18; 7.7% were between the ages of 18 and 24; 24.3% were from 25 to 44; 27.8% were from 45 to 64; and 15.5% were 65 years of age or older. The gender makeup of the town was 47.5% male and 52.5% female.

=== 2000 census ===
As of the 2000 Census, there were 2,368 people, 958 households, and 646 families living in the town. The population density was 1,434.2 inhabitants per square mile (553.7/km^{2}). There were 1,038 housing units at an average density of 628.7 per square mile (242.7/km^{2}). The racial makeup of the town was 98.44% White, 0.42% African American, 0.08% Native American, 0.04% Asian, 0.08% from other races, and 0.93% from two or more races. Hispanic or Latino residents of any race were 0.13% of the population.

There were 958 households, out of which 30.8% had children under the age of 18 living with them, 53.8% were married couples living together, 10.3% had a female householder with no husband present, and 32.5% were non-families. 28.8% of all households were made up of individuals, and 13.7% had someone living alone who was 65 years of age or older. The average household size was 2.39 and the average family size was 2.95.

In the town, 24.4% of the population was under the age of 18, 7.9% was from 18 to 24, 28.2% from 25 to 44, 22.3% from 45 to 64, and 17.3% was 65 years of age or older. The median age was 38 years. For every 100 females, there were 83.4 males. For every 100 females age 18 and over, there were 83.1 males.

The median income for a household in the town was $33,314, and the median income for a family was $40,893. Males had a median income of $33,929 versus $24,286 for females. The per capita income for the town was $16,620. About 4.5% of families and 5.9% of the population were below the poverty line, including 7.9% of those under age 18 and 1.3% of those age 65 or over.

== Education ==
The majority of the city, in Delaware County, is in the Delaware Community School Corporation. The comprehensive high school of that district is Delta High School.

The portion in Randolph County is in the Monroe Central School Corporation.

In August 1974, Albany High School closed, and its students were sent to Delta High.

== Notable persons ==
- Jim Davis, cartoonist of (Garfield); Davis and his company Paws, Inc. reside between Albany and Muncie, Indiana.
- James Grover McDonald (November 29, 1886 -– September 25, 1964), United States diplomat, League of Nations High Commissioner for Refugees Coming from Germany, and first U.S. Ambassador to Israel; Albany was his hometown.
- Bernard Kilgore, Managing Editor of The Wall Street Journal. and President of Dow Jones & Company. Born November 9, 1908, in Albany, IN. He built the small business newspaper into an acclaimed international newspaper with the largest circulation of all publications. A 1929 graduate of DePauw University, a Phi Beta Kappa, and an economics major, he was editor of The DePauw, Indiana's oldest college newspaper, while in college. Source: Indiana Journalism Hall of Fame
