= Trenton Gas Field =

Oil field in Indiana and Ohio, USA

Coordinates: 40°0′N 85°30′W

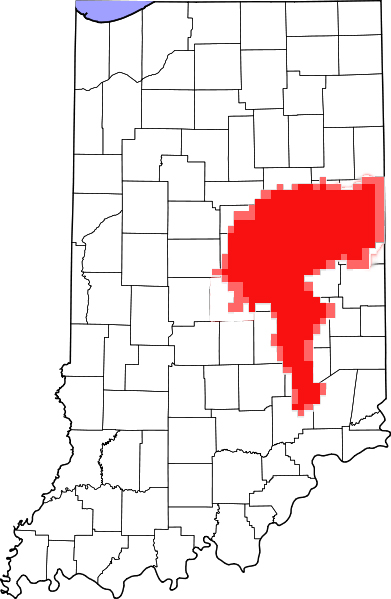
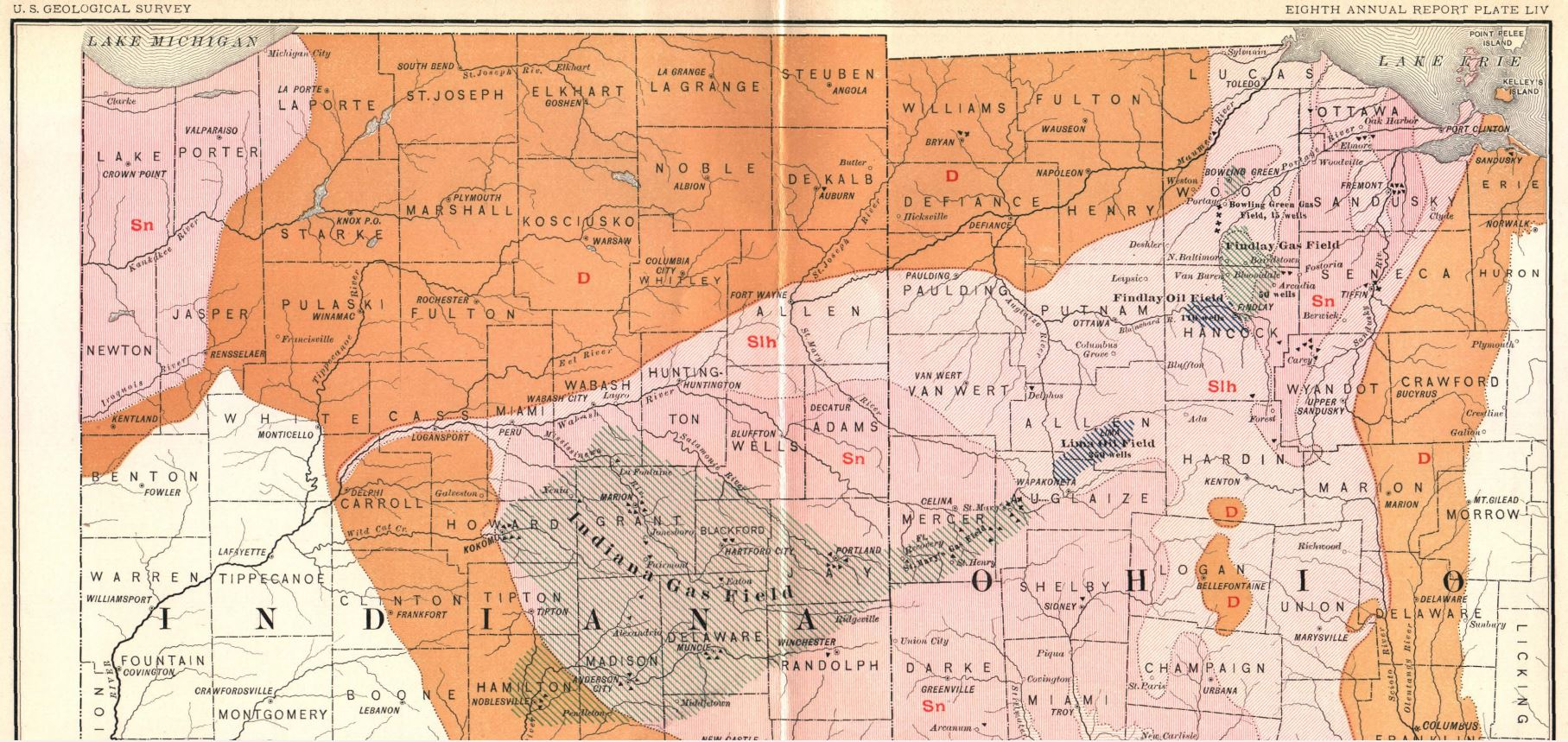
Location of the Trenton Gas Field

The Trenton Gas Field is located in east central Indiana and the most western portion of west central Ohio. The field was discovered in 1876, but the size and magnitude of the field was not known until the 1880s. The field was the largest natural gas discovery up to that time, with an area of 5,120 square miles (13,300 km^{2}), somewhat smaller in area than the state of Connecticut, containing over 1 trillion cubic feet (28×10^{9} m^{3}) of natural gas. The field also contained the first giant oil reserve discovered in the United States, with an estimated 1 billion barrels (160×10^{6} m^{3}) of oil. The discovery led to the Indiana Gas Boom.

Almost all of the natural gas was removed from the field by 1910, but only about 10% of the oil had been removed at that point. The lack of pressure caused by the removal of the gas led to a complete stoppage of oil production, even though an estimated 900 million barrels (140,000,000 m^{3}) of oil remained in the field. Beginning in the late 20th century, oil production resumed at a slow pace after advances in artificial lift technology.

Oil and gas production from this field led the Standard Oil Company to establish refinery operations in Indiana. The firm's production and refinery interests led, in turn, to Standard's Indiana interests being grouped together after the 1911 breakup of the firm due to antitrust action, leading to the formation of the Standard Oil Company of Indiana.

== See also ==
- Trenton Limestone
- Petroleum industry in Ohio

== Sources ==
- Glass, James A. & Kohrman, David (2005). The Gas Boom of East Central Indiana. Arcadia Publishing. ISBN 0-7385-3963-5.
- Gray, Ralph D (1995). Indiana History: A Book of Readings. Indiana: Indiana University Press. ISBN 0-253-32629-X.
