= Richland Township, Jay County, Indiana =

Richland Township
- Township
- Location in Jay County
- Coordinates: 40°20′36″N 85°10′36″W
- Country: United States
- State: Indiana
- County: Jay

Government
  - Type: Indiana township

Area
  - Total: 27.26 sq mi (70.6 km^{2})
  - Land: 27.23 sq mi (70.5 km^{2})
  - Water: 0.03 sq mi (0.078 km^{2}) 0.11%
- Elevation: 955 ft (291 m)

Population (2020)
  - Total: 4,005
  - Density: 147.1/sq mi (56.79/km^{2})
- GNIS feature ID: 0453795

Richland Township is one of twelve townships in Jay County, Indiana, United States. As of the 2020 census, its population was 4,005 (down from 4,518 at 2010) and it contained 1,948 housing units.

== History ==
Richland Township was organized in 1838.

== Geography ==
According to the 2010 census, the township has a total area of 27.26 square miles (70.6 km^{2}), of which 27.23 square miles (70.5 km^{2}) (or 99.89%) is land and 0.03 square miles (0.078 km^{2}) (or 0.11%) is water. The streams of Boot Run, Redkey Run and Thong Run run through this township.

=== Cities and towns ===
- Dunkirk (vast majority)
- Redkey

=== Adjacent townships ===
- Knox Township (north)
- Greene Township (northeast)
- Jefferson Township (east)
- Green Township, Randolph County (south)
- Delaware Township, Delaware County (southwest)
- Niles Township, Delaware County (west)
- Jackson Township, Blackford County (northwest)

=== Cemeteries ===
The township contains one cemetery, Hillcrest.

=== Major highways ===
- SR 1
- SR 67
- SR 167
