= Eaton, Indiana =

- Town
- Town of Eaton
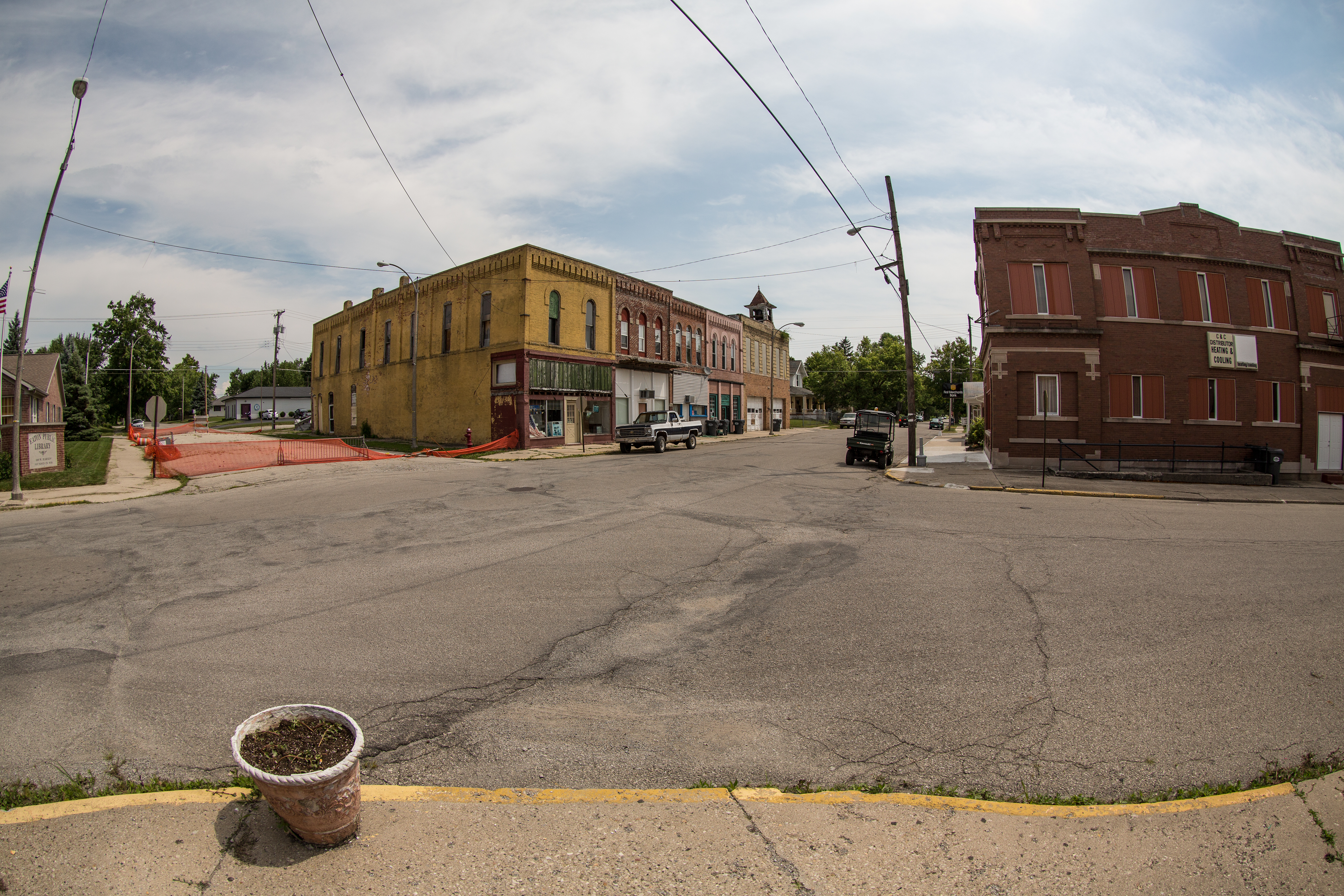
- Downtown Eaton

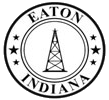
- Seal

- Location of Eaton in Delaware County, Indiana.
- Coordinates: 40°19′19″N 85°21′33″W
- Country: United States
- State: Indiana
- County: Delaware
- Township: Hamilton, Union
- Platted: 1854
- Incorporated: September 10, 1873

Area
  - Total: 3.79 sq mi (9.82 km^{2})
  - Land: 3.73 sq mi (9.65 km^{2})
  - Water: 0.062 sq mi (0.16 km^{2})
- Elevation: 919 ft (280 m)

Population (2020)
  - Total: 1,595
  - Estimate (2025): 1,584 ▼
  - Density: 428.0/sq mi (165.25/km^{2})
- Time zone: UTC-5 (EST)
  - Summer (DST): UTC-5 (EST)
- ZIP code: 47338
- Area code: 765
- FIPS code: 18-20080
- GNIS feature ID: 2396918
- Website: eatonindiana.org

Eaton is a town in Union Township, Delaware County, Indiana, along the Mississinewa River. The population was 1,595 at the 2020 census. It is part of the Muncie Metropolitan Statistical Area.

== History ==
Eaton was laid out and platted in 1854. The town was incorporated September 10, 1873, soon after the railroad had been built through the neighborhood.

The first discovery of natural gas in Indiana occurred in the town of Eaton in 1876. The discovery set off the Indiana Gas Boom, leading to two decades of rapid regional growth.

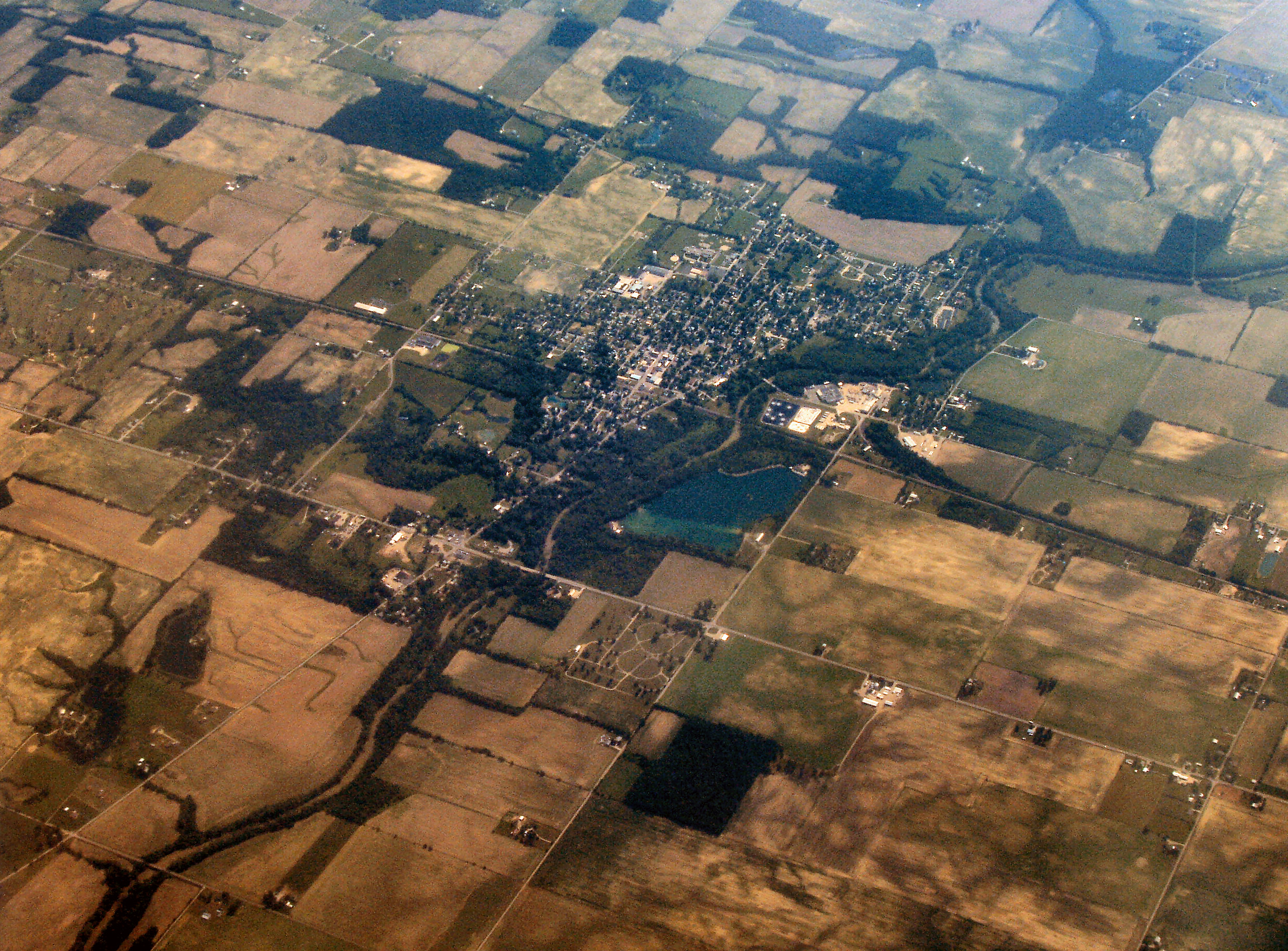
Eaton from the air, looking northeast.

== Geography ==
According to the 2010 census, Eaton has a total area of 3.76 square miles (9.74 km^{2}), of which 3.7 square miles (9.58 km^{2}) (or 98.4%) is land and 0.06 square miles (0.16 km^{2}) (or 1.6%) is water.

== Demographics ==
Historical population
Census	Pop.	Note	%±
1880	208		—
1900	1,567		—
1910	1,428		−8.9%
1920	1,214		−15.0%
1930	1,273		4.9%
1940	1,453		14.1%
1950	1,598		10.0%
1960	1,529		−4.3%
1970	1,594		4.3%
1980	1,804		13.2%
1990	1,614		−10.5%
2000	1,603		−0.7%
2010	1,805		12.6%
2020	1,595		−11.6%
2025 (est.)	1,584	▼	−0.7%
U.S. Decennial Census

=== 2020 census ===
As of the 2020 census, there were 1,595 people, 661 households, and 379 families living in the town. The population density was 420.8 inhabitants per square mile (162.5/km^{2}). There were 779 housing units at an average density of 205.5 per square mile (79.3/km^{2}).

The median age was 39.4 years. 24.3% of residents were under the age of 18 and 18.5% were 65 years of age or older. For every 100 females there were 95.5 males, and for every 100 females age 18 and over there were 93.4 males age 18 and over.

0.0% of residents lived in urban areas, while 100.0% lived in rural areas.

Of households in the town, 32.1% had children under the age of 18 living in them. Of all households, 46.1% were married-couple households, 19.5% were households with a male householder and no spouse or partner present, and 26.0% were households with a female householder and no spouse or partner present. About 27.9% of all households were made up of individuals and 13.5% had someone living alone who was 65 years of age or older. The average household size was 2.41 and the average family size was 3.01.

Of housing units in the town, 15.1% were vacant. The homeowner vacancy rate was 3.5% and the rental vacancy rate was 9.7%.

Racial composition as of the 2020 census
Race	Number	Percent
White	1,535	96.2%
Black or African American	6	0.4%
American Indian and Alaska Native	4	0.3%
Asian	1	0.1%
Native Hawaiian and Other Pacific Islander	0	0.0%
Some other race	6	0.4%
Two or more races	43	2.7%
Hispanic or Latino (of any race)	18	1.1%

=== Demographic estimates ===
An additional demographic profile reported that 27.5% of the population had never been married, 41.7% were married and not separated, 8.1% were widowed, 18.9% were divorced, and 3.6% were separated.

The same profile reported that 6.8% of residents were under the age of 5 and 9.4% of the population were veterans. The only language spoken at home was English at 100%, and none of the population were foreign born.

The median household income in Eaton was $45,385, 19.2% less than the median average for the state of Indiana. 10.4% of the population were in poverty, including 13.9% of residents under the age of 18. The poverty rate for the town was 2.5% lower than that of the state. 17.0% of the population was disabled and 6.1% had no healthcare coverage. 40.8% of the population had attained a high school or equivalent degree, 25.7% had attended college but received no degree, 13.6% had attained an Associate's degree or higher, 6.4% had attained a Bachelor's degree or higher, and 3.7% had a graduate or professional degree. 9.8% had no degree. 56.0% of Eaton residents were employed, working a mean of 39.7 hours per week. The median gross rent in Eaton was $648 and the homeownership rate was 73.6%.

=== 2010 census ===
As of the census of 2010, there were 1,805 people, 696 households, and 508 families living in the town. The population density was 487.8 inhabitants per square mile (188.3/km^{2}). There were 824 housing units at an average density of 222.7 per square mile (86.0/km^{2}). The racial makeup of the town was 97.8% White, 0.1% African American, 0.3% Native American, 0.1% Asian, 0.4% from other races, and 1.3% from two or more races. Hispanic or Latino of any race were 1.8% of the population.

There were 696 households, of which 37.8% had children under the age of 18 living with them, 52.6% were married couples living together, 14.1% had a female householder with no husband present, 6.3% had a male householder with no wife present, and 27.0% were non-families. 23.3% of all households were made up of individuals, and 10.5% had someone living alone who was 65 years of age or older. The average household size was 2.59 and the average family size was 3.03.

The median age in the town was 36.3 years. 27.4% of residents were under the age of 18; 8.8% were between the ages of 18 and 24; 25.7% were from 25 to 44; 23.9% were from 45 to 64; and 14.2% were 65 years of age or older. The gender makeup of the town was 51.1% male and 48.9% female.

=== 2000 census ===
As of the census of 2000, there were 1,603 people, 619 households, and 459 families living in the town. The population density was 1,432.0 inhabitants per square mile (552.9/km^{2}). There were 661 housing units at an average density of 590.5 per square mile (228.0/km^{2}). The racial makeup of the town was 98.75% White, 0.25% Native American, 0.06% Asian, 0.12% from other races, and 0.81% from two or more races. Hispanic or Latino of any race were 0.81% of the population.

There were 619 households, out of which 40.2% had children under the age of 18 living with them, 57.2% were married couples living together, 11.0% had a female householder with no husband present, and 25.7% were non-families. 23.6% of all households were made up of individuals, and 9.2% had someone living alone who was 65 years of age or older. The average household size was 2.59 and the average family size was 3.00.

In the town, the population was spread out, with 30.6% under the age of 18, 7.7% from 18 to 24, 29.8% from 25 to 44, 19.8% from 45 to 64, and 12.0% who were 65 years of age or older. The median age was 33 years. For every 100 females, there were 96.7 males. For every 100 females age 18 and over, there were 91.4 males.

The median income for a household in the town was $31,563, and the median income for a family was $35,625. Males had a median income of $31,573 versus $20,645 for females. The per capita income for the town was $13,833. About 9.5% of families and 11.1% of the population were below the poverty line, including 13.9% of those under age 18 and 3.5% of those age 65 or over.

== Education ==
It is in the Delaware Community School Corporation. Eaton Elementary School is a public elementary school located in Eaton. The school is a part of the Delaware Community School Corporation and serves around 275 students in grades kindergarten to 5th grade. There is Delta Middle School, and the comprehensive high school of that district is Delta High School.

Eaton Public Library is a non-profit library funded wholly by memberships and donations. Through the support of volunteer staff, the library is open 7 days a week. The library offers family and individual memberships for the year, 3 months, or even just the day for an individual. Memberships are open to all residents of East-Central Indiana.
