= Indiana Garfield statues =

Public art project based in Indiana, US

Firefighter Garfield

Several East Central Indiana counties have erected statues of the comic strip character Garfield. The cartoonist who created him, Jim Davis, donated the artwork as royalty-free statues. As such, most of them are located near his hometown, Marion.

== Locations ==
- A "James Dean Garfield", dressed in an open-button collar and denim jeans, was unveiled outside the Fairmount Historical Museum in Fairmount, Indiana, in 2005.
- A "Popcorn Eating Garfield" in tribute to Van Buren, Indiana, was unveiled at the Popcorn Festival in August 2006.
- A "College-bound Garfield" was unveiled along the Sweetser Switch Trail in Sweetser, Indiana, in October 2006. Its lower left arm was repaired in 2007 after being cut off.
- Marion's first statue, a "Health and Fitness Garfield", dressed in running attire in the colors of Marion High School and carrying a water bottle, was placed along the Mississinewa River in July 2006. Its head was repaired after it fell off when a man hugged it too tightly. During the Oktoberfest celebrations in 2009, City officials moved the statue to Matters Park.
- Marion's second statue, a "Doctor Garfield" wearing surgical scrubs, holding a stethoscope and resting one foot on a first aid kit, was unveiled at Marion General Hospital on May 11, 2007. It was funded by hospital staff members.
- A "Speedkings Garfield" dressed in a #9 jersey, representing the number of overtime periods played in the record-setting basketball game against Liberty Center in 1964, was erected on Washington Street in Swayzee, Indiana in June 2008.
- A "Fisherman Garfield" was erected near the Cumberland Covered Bridge in Matthews, Indiana, in 2009 as an homage to the local river and bridges.
- A "Firefighter Garfield" was erected on 7 W Street in Jonesboro, Indiana, in 2009 to commemorate the city establishing the first organized fire department in the county.
- An "Ice Cream Lover Garfield" was installed near Ivanhoe's Restaurant in Upland, Indiana, in 2009.
- A "Gas Worker Garfield" with a derrick reminiscent of the natural gas boom at the turn of the 19th century was installed in front of the local library in Gas City, Indiana, in May 2011.
- A statue of Garfield dressed in a British redcoat was erected outside Payne's restaurant in Gas City.
- Muncie, Indiana, has several Garfield statues throughout the city, many of which are situated on and around the Ball State University campus.
- While not an official part of the project, a wooden "Golfer Garfield" was commissioned by Arbor Trace Golf Club in Marion and placed in the clubhouse.
