= Marion Community Schools =

School district in Indiana, United States

Marion Community Schools is a school district headquartered in Marion, Indiana.

It is in Grant County and covers the following townships: all of Center and portions of Franklin, Pleasant, and Washington. It covers the vast majority of the Marion city limits and a piece of the Gas City city limits; no residential parts of Gas City are in the Marion district.

== History ==
In the period 1993 to 2013, the district had ten individuals who had been superintendent.

Brad Lindsay became the superintendent in July 2013. He held that role until he said that he was going to resign effective 2022.

Keith Burke later became superintendent. He retired in December 2024. Stephanie Lockwood became the superintendent effective January 4, 2025. Her contract was renewed in 2026.

== Schools ==
Secondary schools

- Marion High School
- McCulloch Junior High School

Primary schools

- Justice Intermediate School

Elementary schools:
- Allen Elementary School
- Kendall Elementary School
- Riverview Elementary School
- Frances Slocum Elementary School

Preschool

- Little Giants Preschool

Adult education

- Grant Regional Adult Education

== District facilities ==
- Grant Regional Career Center
- Walton Performing Arts Center
