= Mississinewa =

Mississinewa may refer to:

- Mississinewa River in Indiana
- USS Mississinewa may refer to:
  - USS Mississinewa (AO-59), a Cimarron-class fleet oiler, was launched 28 March 1944 and sunk 15 November 1944.
  - USS Mississinewa (AO-144), a Neosho-class fleet oiler, was in service from 1955 to 1991.
- Mississinewa High School
- Treaty of Mississinewas, 1826
- Mississinewa Lake Dam
- The Battle of the Mississinewa
- Mississinawa Township, Darke County, Ohio
