= John Harvey Baldwin =

American lawyer and politician

John Harvey Baldwin (April 4, 1851 – June 19, 1924) was an American lawyer and politician.

Baldwin was born in Jonesboro, Grant County, Indiana and went to Spiceland Academy in Spiceland, Indiana. He was admitted to the Indiana bar in 1876 and practiced law in Grant County, Indiana. In 1882, Baldwin moved to Hand County, Dakota Territory and continued to practice law. He served as the South Dakota State Water Engineer for four years. In 1900, Baldwin moved to Frazee, Becker County, Minnesota and continued to practice law. He served in the Minnesota Senate, from 1915 to 1922, and was a Republican.
