= USS Mississinewa =

USS Mississinewa refers to two ships for the US Navy, both named for the Mississinewa River in eastern Indiana:

- USS Mississinewa (AO-59), a Cimarron-class fleet oiler, was launched 28 March 1944 and sunk 20 November 1944
- USS Mississinewa (AO-144), a Neosho-class fleet oiler, was in service from 1955 to 1991
