= Dr. Richard Davis House =

Historic house in Indiana, United States

- Woodside
- U.S. National Register of Historic Places
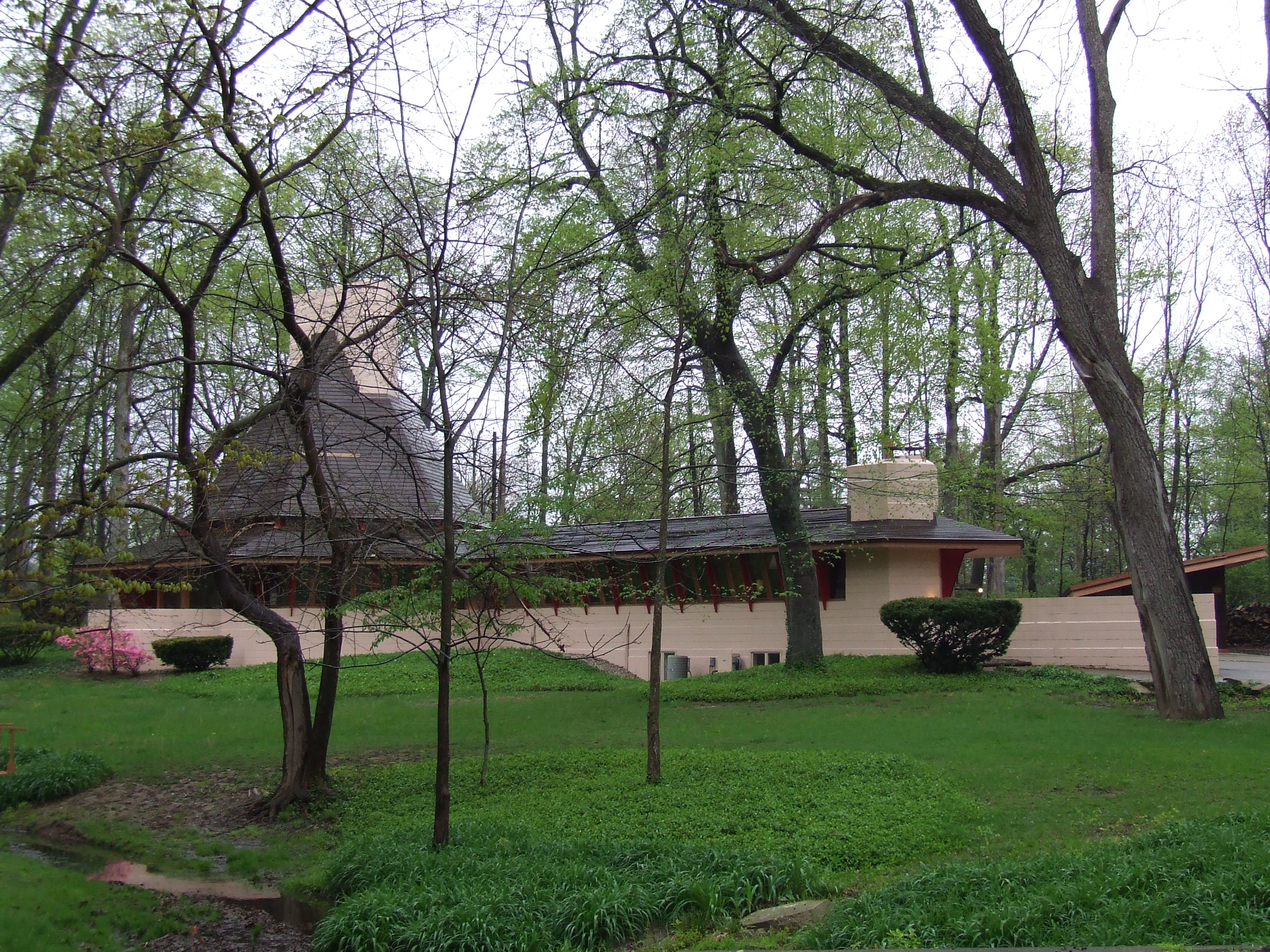

- Location within Indiana Location within the United States
- Location: 1119 Overlook Rd., north of Marion, Washington Township, Grant County, Indiana
- Coordinates: 40°35′19.28″N 85°40′26.78″W
- Area: 2 acres (0.81 ha)
- Built: Main house in 1955; addition completed in 1960
- Architect: Frank Lloyd Wright, Davidson, Alan
- Architectural style: Usonian
- NRHP reference No.: 97001538
- Added to NRHP: December 24, 1997

The Dr. Richard Davis House, also known as "Woodside", is a historic Frank Lloyd Wright designed home in the Shady Hills neighborhood in Washington Township, just north of Marion in Grant County, Indiana. The Usonian style home was constructed in 1955. An addition was completed in 1960.

It was listed on the National Register of Historic Places in 1997.

== See also ==
- List of Frank Lloyd Wright works
- National Register of Historic Places listings in Grant County, Indiana
