= Mill Township, Grant County, Indiana =

Mill Township
- Township
- Location of Mill Township in Grant County
- Coordinates: 40°28′53″N 85°37′05″W
- Country: United States
- State: Indiana
- County: Grant

Government
  - Type: Indiana township

Area
  - Total: 23.19 sq mi (60.1 km^{2})
  - Land: 23.18 sq mi (60.0 km^{2})
  - Water: 0.01 sq mi (0.026 km^{2}) 0.04%
- Elevation: 850 ft (259 m)

Population (2020)
  - Total: 10,497
  - Density: 189.4/sq mi (73.1/km^{2})
- GNIS feature ID: 0453626
- Website: Mill Township

Mill Township is one of thirteen townships in Grant County, Indiana, United States. As of the 2010 census, its population was 10,882 and it contained 4,809 housing units.

== Geography ==
According to the 2010 census, the township has a total area of 23.19 square miles (60.1 km^{2}), of which 23.18 square miles (60.0 km^{2}) (or 99.96%) is land and 0.01 square miles (0.026 km^{2}) (or 0.04%) is water. The streams of Bean Run, City Run, Ethel Run, Long Branch, Octain Creek, Regular Run and Shell Run run through this township.

=== Cities and towns ===
- Gas City (south three-quarters)
- Marion (southeast edge)
- Jonesboro

=== Adjacent townships ===
- Center Township (north)
- Monroe Township (east)
- Jefferson Township (southeast)
- Fairmount Township (south)
- Liberty Township (southwest)
- Franklin Township (west)

=== Cemeteries ===
The township contains two cemeteries: Riverside and Walnut Creek.

=== Major highways ===
- US 35
- SR 9
- SR 15
- SR 22

== Education ==
It is in the Mississinewa Community School Corporation. The district's comprehensive high school is Mississinewa High School.

Mill Township residents may obtain a library card from the Gas City-Mill Township Public Library in Gas City.
