= Landess, Indiana =

- Census-designated place
- Location of Landess in Grant County, Indiana.

- Location within Indiana Location within the United States
- Coordinates: 40°36′45″N 85°33′33″W
- Country: United States
- State: Indiana
- County: Grant
- Townships: Washington, Van Buren

Area
  - Total: 1.41 sq mi (3.64 km^{2})
  - Land: 1.41 sq mi (3.64 km^{2})
  - Water: 0 sq mi (0.00 km^{2})
- Elevation: 863 ft (263 m)

Population (2020)
  - Total: 153
  - Density: 109.0/sq mi (42.07/km^{2})
- ZIP code: 46991
- FIPS code: 18-41994
- GNIS feature ID: 2583458

Landess is an unincorporated community and census-designated place (CDP) in Washington and Van Buren townships, Grant County, Indiana, in the United States. As of the 2020 census, Landess had a population of 153.

== History ==
Landess was founded in 1882 by William Landess. A post office was established at Landess in 1884, and remained in operation until it was discontinued in 1996.

== Geography ==
Landess is located in northeastern Grant County, 9 miles (14 km) northeast of Marion, the county seat, and 3 miles (5 km) west of Van Buren. Interstate 69 forms the southeastern edge of the Landess CDP, but there is no access to the highway at this point. The closest interchanges are Exit 264 (Indiana State Road 18), 4 miles (6 km) to the south, and Exit 273 (State Road 5), 7 miles (11 km) to the northeast.

According to the U.S. Census Bureau, the Landess CDP has an area of 1.4 square miles (3.6 km^{2}), all of it land.

== Demographics ==
Historical population
Census	Pop.	Note	%±
2020	153		—
U.S. Decennial Census
