= Jalapa, Indiana =

- Census-designated place
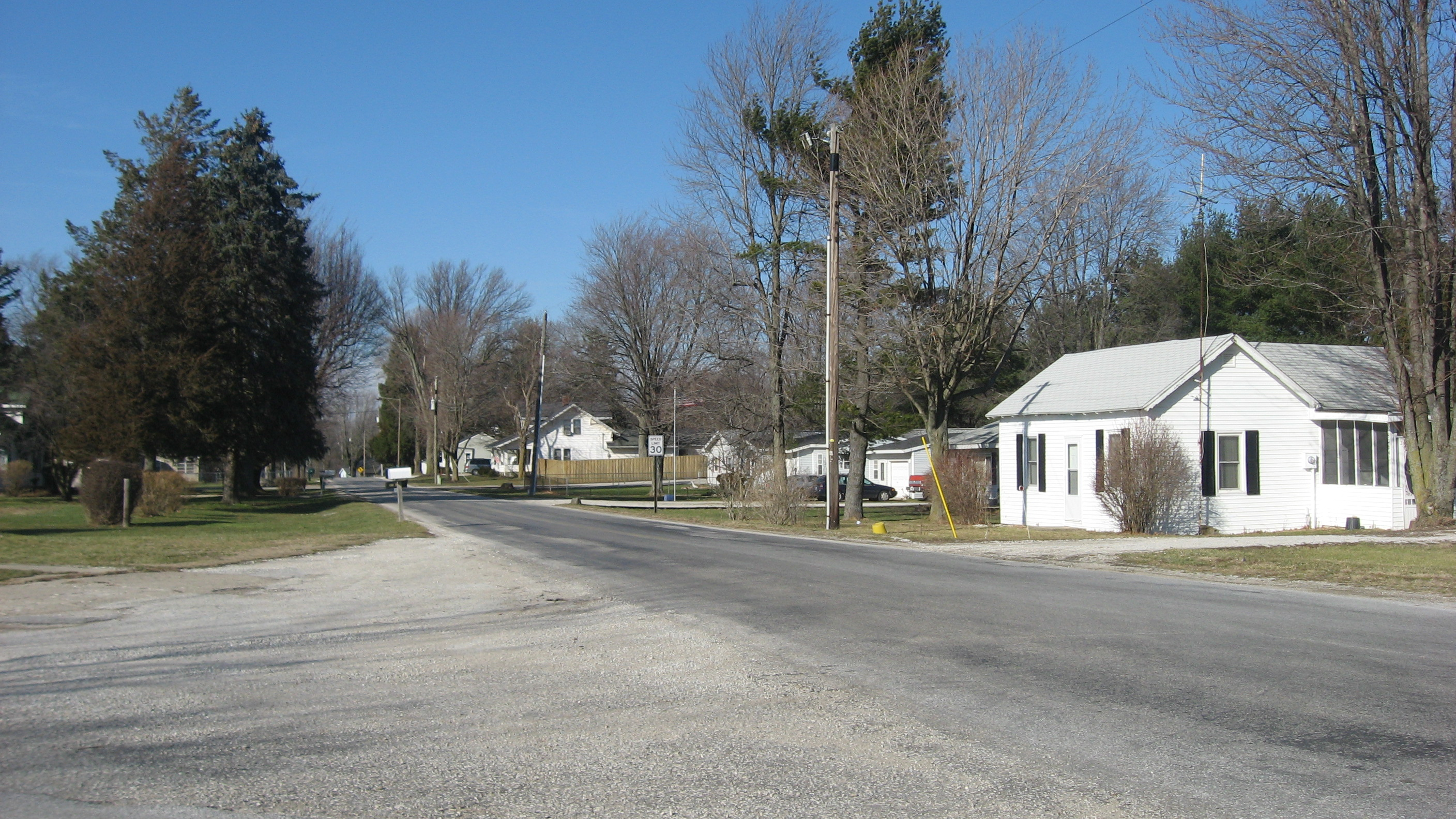
- Houses on the Frances Slocum Trail at Jalapa

- Location of Jalapa in Grant County, Indiana.

- Location within Indiana Location within the United States
- Coordinates: 40°37′40″N 85°44′44″W
- Country: United States
- State: Indiana
- County: Grant
- Township: Pleasant

Area
  - Total: 0.57 sq mi (1.48 km^{2})
  - Land: 0.57 sq mi (1.48 km^{2})
  - Water: 0 sq mi (0.00 km^{2})
- Elevation: 820 ft (250 m)

Population (2020)
  - Total: 182
  - Density: 318.0/sq mi (122.79/km^{2})
- ZIP code: 46952
- FIPS code: 18-37674
- GNIS feature ID: 2583457

Jalapa is an unincorporated community and census-designated place (CDP) in Pleasant Township, Grant County, Indiana, United States. As of the 2020 census, Jalapa had a population of 182.

== History ==
The first post office in Jalapa, called "Dallas", operated from 1848 until 1849. The post office was renamed "Jalapa" in 1849, and remained in operation until it was discontinued in 1900. The community was named after Jalapa, in Mexico.

== Geography ==
Jalapa is located in northwestern Grant County on high ground just southwest of the Mississinewa River, a northwest-flowing tributary of the Wabash River. Jalapa is 7 miles (11 km) northwest of Marion, the Grant County seat.

According to the U.S. Census Bureau, the Jalapa CDP has an area of 3.2 square miles (8.2 km^{2}), all of it land.

== Demographics ==
Historical population
Census	Pop.	Note	%±
2020	182		—
U.S. Decennial Census
