= Shady Hills =

Shady Hills may refer to:

- Shady Hills, Florida, a census-designated place in Pasco County, Florida, United States
- Shady Hills, Indiana, a neighborhood north of Marion, Grant County, Indiana, United States
