= Michaelsville, Indiana =

- Unincorporated community
- Location within Indiana Location within the United States
- Coordinates: 40°31′25″N 85°42′07″W
- Country: United States
- State: Indiana
- County: Grant
- Township: Franklin
- Elevation: 850 ft (260 m)
- ZIP code: 46953
- FIPS code: 18-48730
- GNIS feature ID: 439077

Michaelsville is an unincorporated community in Franklin Township, Grant County, Indiana.

== History ==
Michaelsville once contained a post office, called Michael, which operated from 1892 until 1902. William Michael served as postmaster.
