= Marion High School (Indiana) =

Location
- 750 West 26th Street; Marion, Grant County, Indiana 46953; United States; 40.538736°N 85.668924°W

Information
- Type: Public high school
- Motto: “Giants Fight Never Die”
- Established: 1891
- School district: Marion Community Schools
- Principal: Javon Washington
- Teaching staff: 61.83 (FTE)
- Grades: 9–12
- Enrollment: 1,052 (2023–2024)
- Student to teacher ratio: 17.01
- Colors: Purple and gold
- Fight song: Were ‘loyal to you Marion High
- Athletics conference: North Central Conference
- Mascot: Giants
- Rivals: Mississinewa,Kokomo
- Website: mhs.marion.k12.in.us

Marion High School is a high school in Marion, Indiana, United States, with more than 1,000 students. It is a part of Marion Community Schools.

== History ==
Marion High School's first campus opened in September 1891. In 1902, the building burned to the ground. The next building stood for six years, being burned in 1908 in a possible arson attack. The second campus opened in 1910 on West Nelson Street where it would remain open until 1967.

Marion High School's current campus opened in 1964 on 26th Street. The school was split into two campuses, North & South. The North campus held ninth graders, while the South campus held tenth through twelfth graders. But, the North campus was closed for the 1966–1967 school year. Plans began early for the next parts of Marion High School's South Campus. A total of $1,225,000 was appropriated for the building of a kitchen and cafeteria building and the building of a vocational unit. Bids opened for both of these parts, along with a second academic unit, on October 10, 1964.

The second academic unit, or "Building Two," was under construction but not finished for the 1964–1965 school year. It would open for the 1965–1966 school year. On May 2, 1970, Marion High School opened the Physical Education wing. It was built on with an extension of "Building Two" with ten additional classrooms and a planetarium that was completed in 1971.

In late-1970 the school district decided to add another necessary addition to campus. The Auditorium wing was set to open for the 1972–1973 school year. But because of a brutally cold winter, the opening was set back to the 1973–1974 school year. The Auditorium has become one of the most important parts of the school and the city.

== Athletics ==
The name of the students and the athletic teams is the "Giants," and their teams compete in Indiana's North Central Conference. The school is best known for its basketball teams, which have won eight IHSAA state championships. Former Marion basketball coach Bill Green holds the state record with six state championships, of which the back-to-back-to-back crowns of '85, '86 and '87 became known as "Purple Reign."

== Performing arts ==
MHS' swing choir, "26th Street Singers," won the 1975 Bishop Luers High School Swing Choir Invitational, regarded by some as the first true show choir competition. They also took home top honors in the 1976 and 1977 editions of the event.

== Notable alumni ==
- James Blackmon Sr., former University of Kentucky basketball player
- James Blackmon Jr., former Indiana University basketball and NBA player
- Jay Edwards, Indiana University and NBA basketball player
- Ralph Isselhardt, American football player
- Zach Randolph, former Michigan State University basketball player; retired professional basketball player and two-time NBA all-star
- Ann Vermilion, member of the Indiana House of Representatives

== See also ==
- List of high schools in Indiana
