= Roseburg, Grant County, Indiana =

- Unincorporated community
- Location within Indiana Location within the United States
- Coordinates: 40°31′19″N 85°43′46″W
- Country: United States
- State: Indiana
- County: Grant
- Township: Franklin
- Elevation: 850 ft (260 m)
- ZIP code: 46953
- FIPS code: 18-65898
- GNIS feature ID: 449721

Roseburg is an unincorporated community in Franklin Township, Grant County, Indiana.

== History ==
A post office was established as Roseburgh in 1854, and remained in operation until it was discontinued in 1902.
