= Normal, Indiana =

Unincorporated community in Indiana, U.S.

Coordinates: 40°27′54″N 85°49′31″W

Normal is an unincorporated community in Grant County, Indiana, in the United States.

== History ==
The first post office opened at Normal, in 1852, was called Slash. The post office was renamed Normal in 1880, and remained in operation until it was discontinued in 1902.
