= Farrville, Indiana =

- Unincorporated community
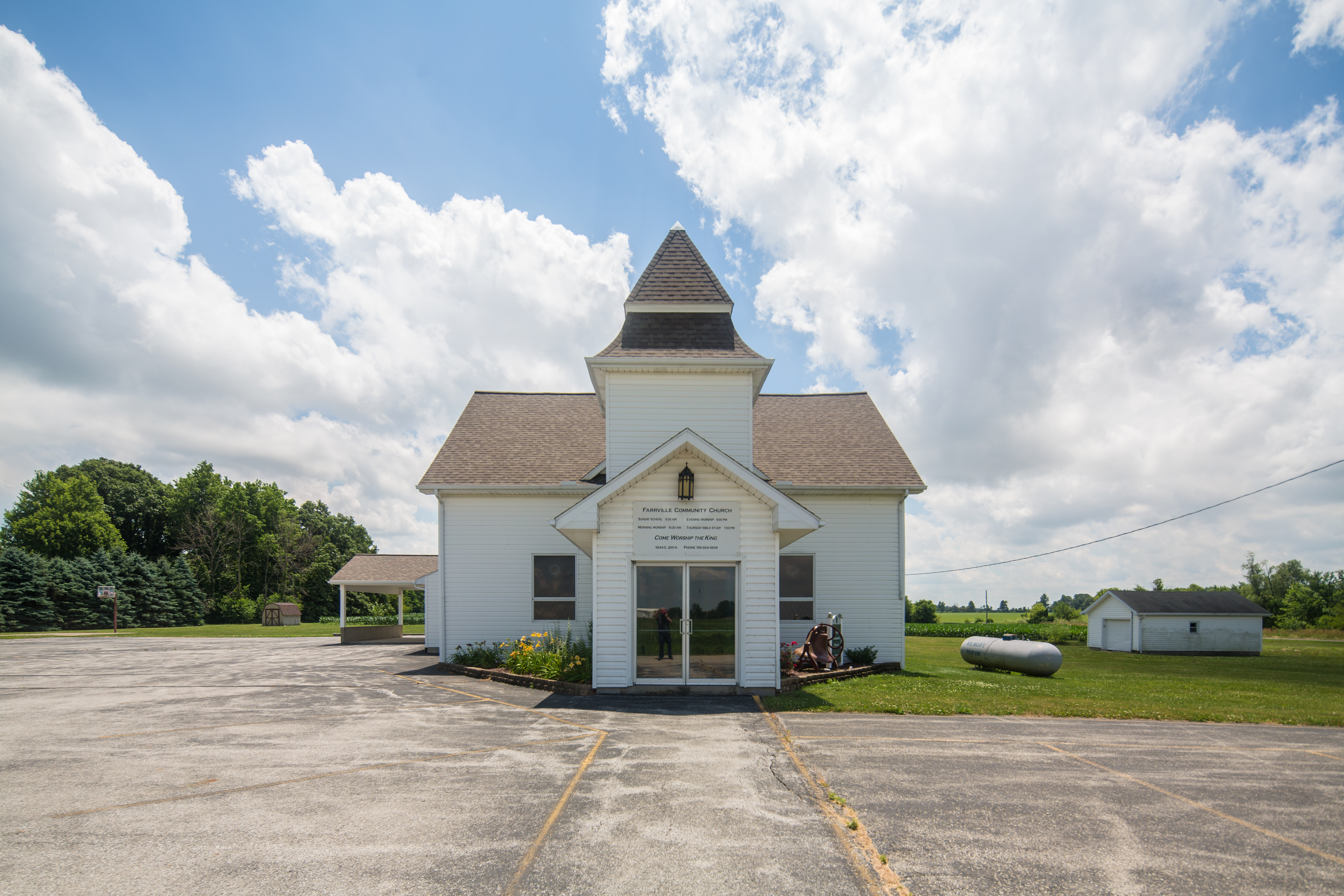

- Location within Indiana Location within the United States
- Coordinates: 40°34′52″N 85°27′59″W
- Country: United States
- State: Indiana
- County: Grant
- Township: Van Buren
- Elevation: 846 ft (258 m)
- ZIP code: 46991
- FIPS code: 18-22828
- GNIS feature ID: 434415

Farrville is an unincorporated community in Van Buren Township, Grant County, Indiana.

== History ==
A post office was established at Farrville in 1887, and remained in operation until it was discontinued in 1902. Alfred Farr served as first postmaster.
