= Meshingomesia Cemetery and Indian School Historic District =

Historic district in Indiana, United States

- U.S. National Register of Historic Places
- U.S. Historic district
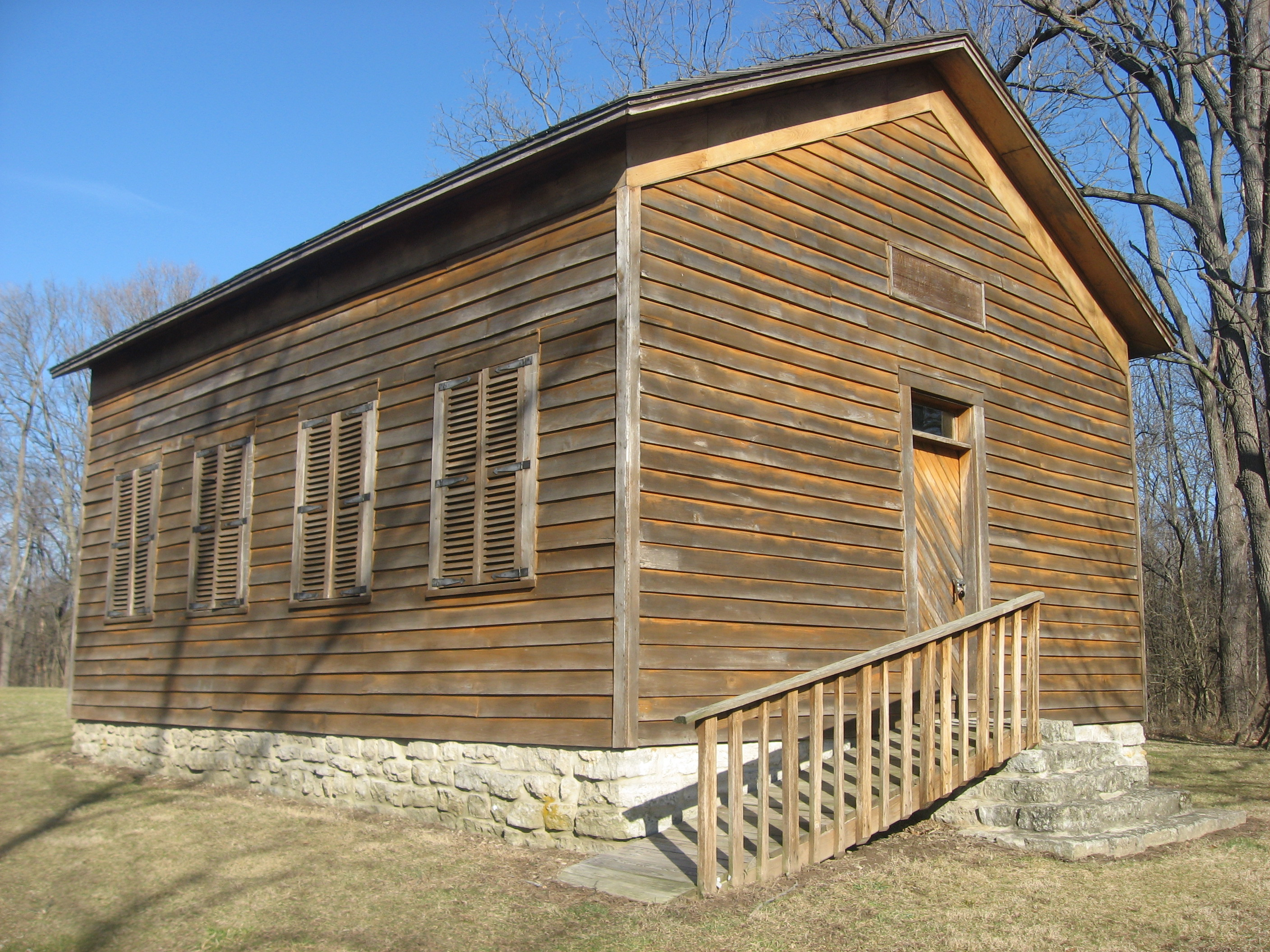
- Meshingomesia Indian School, January 2013

- Location within Indiana Location within the United States
- Location: 3820 W600N, northeast of Jalapa, Pleasant Township, Indiana
- Coordinates: 40°38′28″N 85°43′50″W
- Area: 1.7 acres (0.69 ha)
- Built: 1795–1881
- Architectural style: Greek Revival
- NRHP reference No.: 12001149
- Added to NRHP: January 9, 2013

Meshingomesia Cemetery and Indian School Historic District is a historic Indian school, cemetery, and national historic district located in Pleasant Township, Grant County, Indiana. This site was historically used for a variety of purposes including education, recreation, cultural, civic and government, and ceremonial. It is also known as Mihsiinkweemisa Cemetery and Indian School Historic District. It was listed on the National Register of Historic Places in 2013.

== History ==
It encompasses a school building (c. 1870), a cemetery, and grave markers located on a portion of land reserved by the Miami Nation during the period of treaty making between 1794 and 1840. The property has been continuously owned by the Miami (Myaamia) people.

The school building was moved to its present location about 1944 and restored in 1998. It is not known how many people were buried here. Not all of the burial markers are intact, with roughly 65 visible gravestones.
