= Israel Jenkins House =

Historic house in Indiana, United States

- U.S. National Register of Historic Places
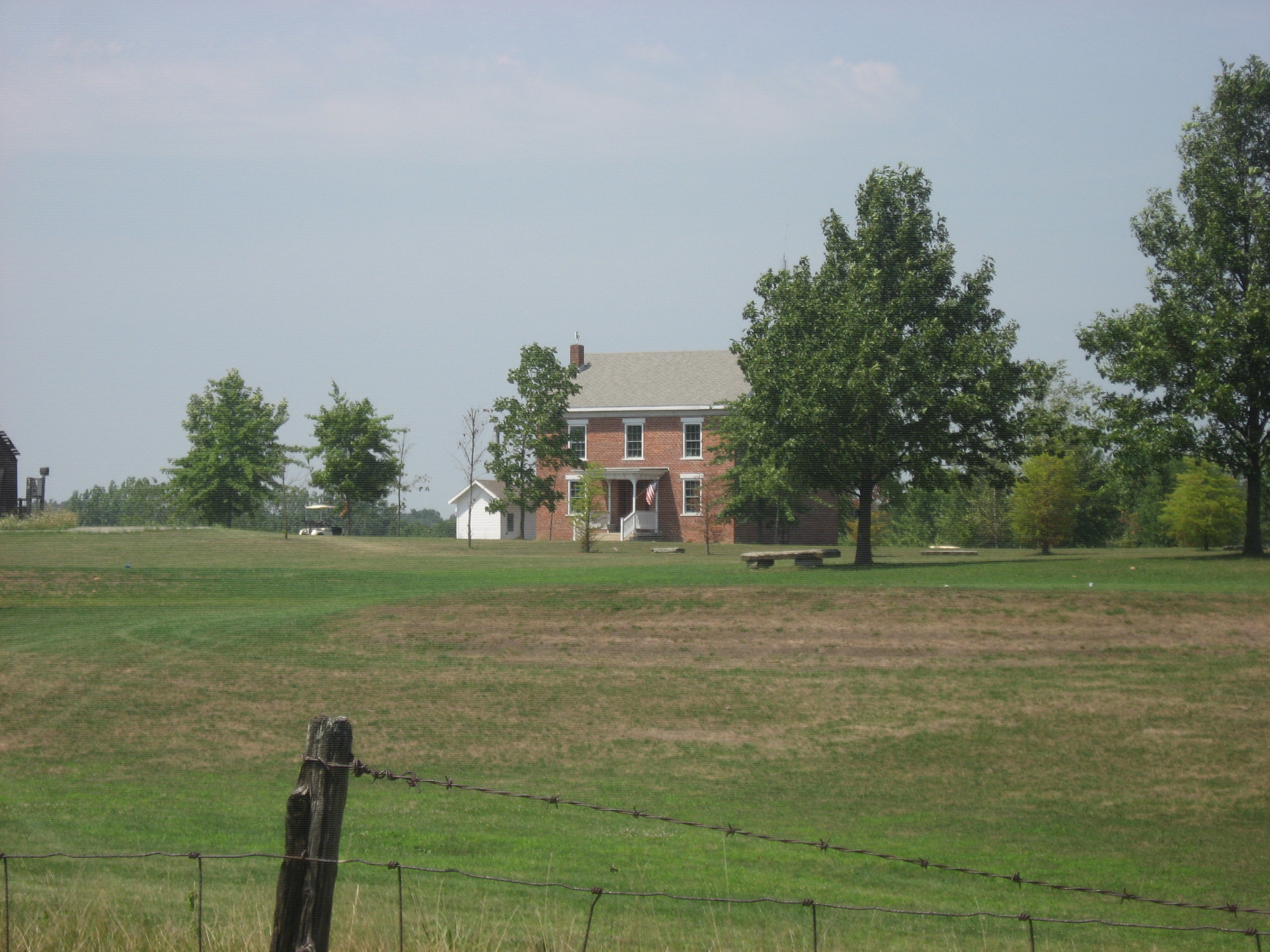
- Israel Jenkins House, July 2012

- Location within Indiana Location within the United States
- Location: 7453 E 400 S, Monroe Township, Indiana
- Coordinates: 40°29′49″N 85°31′40″W
- Area: Less than 1 acre (0.40 ha)
- Built: c. 1840
- Architectural style: Greek Revival
- NRHP reference No.: 03000139
- Added to NRHP: March 26, 2003

Israel Jenkins House, also known as The Elms, is a historic home located near Marion, in Monroe Township, Grant County, Indiana. It was built about 1840, and is a 2 1/2-story, vernacular Greek Revival style, double pile brick dwelling. It has a side gable roof. Also on the property is a contributing 19th century English barn, silo, and long storage shed.

It was listed on the National Register of Historic Places in 2003.
