= Hanfield, Indiana =

Unincorporated community in Grant County, Indiana, United States

- Unincorporated community
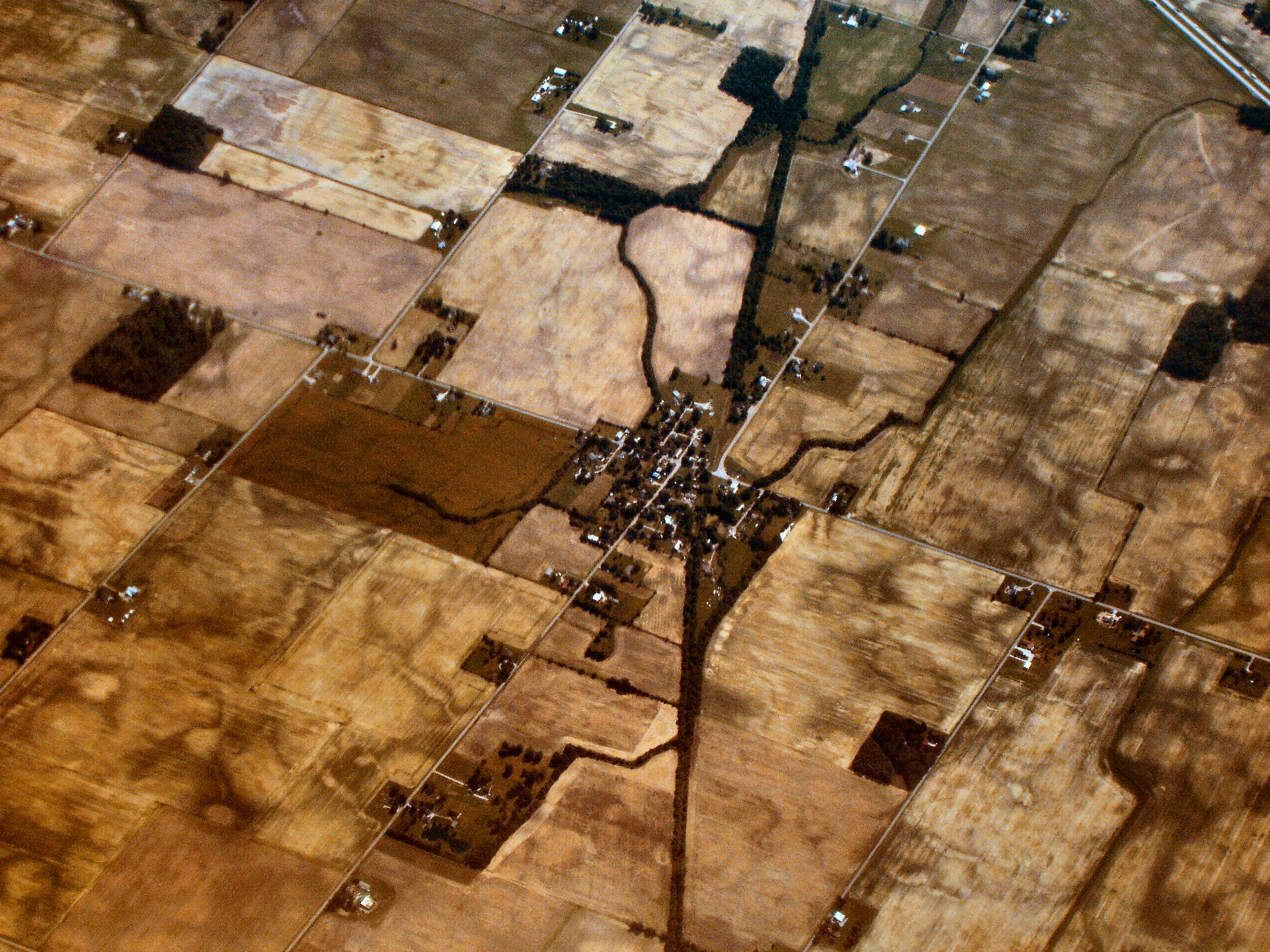

- Location within Indiana Location within the United States
- Coordinates: 40°36′16″N 85°34′49″W
- Country: United States
- State: Indiana
- County: Grant
- Township: Washington
- Elevation: 873 ft (266 m)
- ZIP code: 46952
- FIPS code: 18-31126
- GNIS feature ID: 435674

Hanfield is an unincorporated community in Washington Township, Grant County, Indiana.

== History ==
A post office was established at Hanfield in 1881, and remained in operation until it was discontinued in 1929. Hanfield is likely a conjoin of the surnames Hancock and Garfield.
