= Herbst, Indiana =

- Census-designated place
- Location of Herbst in Grant County, Indiana.

- Location within Indiana Location within the United States
- Coordinates: 40°30′50″N 85°47′15″W
- Country: United States
- State: Indiana
- County: Grant
- Township: Franklin

Area
  - Total: 0.14 sq mi (0.35 km^{2})
  - Land: 0.14 sq mi (0.35 km^{2})
  - Water: 0 sq mi (0.00 km^{2})
- Elevation: 856 ft (261 m)

Population (2020)
  - Total: 99
  - Density: 728.3/sq mi (281.19/km^{2})
- ZIP code: 46953
- FIPS code: 18-33178
- GNIS feature ID: 2583455

Herbst is an unincorporated census-designated place in Franklin Township, Grant County, Indiana, in the United States. As of the 2020 census, Herbst had a population of 99.

== History ==
A post office was established at Herbst in 1880, and remained in operation until it was discontinued in 1962. August H. Herbst served as the first postmaster.

== Geography ==
Herbst is located in western Grant County 9 miles (14 km) southwest of Marion, the county seat, and 2 miles (3 km) east of Swayzee.

According to the U.S. Census Bureau, the Herbst CDP has an area of 1.31 square miles (3.38 km^{2}), all of it land.

== Demographics ==
Historical population
Census	Pop.	Note	%±
2020	99		—
U.S. Decennial Census
