= Center Township, Grant County, Indiana =

Center Township
- Township
- Location of Center Township in Grant County
- Coordinates: 40°32′19″N 85°37′15″W
- Country: United States
- State: Indiana
- County: Grant

Government
  - Type: Indiana township

Area
  - Total: 25.05 sq mi (64.9 km^{2})
  - Land: 24.93 sq mi (64.6 km^{2})
  - Water: 0.12 sq mi (0.31 km^{2}) 0.48%
- Elevation: 837 ft (255 m)

Population (2020)
  - Total: 21,583
  - Density: 938.7/sq mi (362.4/km^{2})
- GNIS feature ID: 453178
- Website: marioncentertownship.in

Center Township is one of the thirteen townships in Grant County, Indiana, United States. As of the 2010 census, its population was 23,406 and it contained 10,189 housing units. It is home to the Veterans Administration Medical Center.

== Geography ==
According to the 2010 census, the township has a total area of 25.05 square miles (64.9 km^{2}), of which 24.93 square miles (64.6 km^{2}) (or 99.52%) is land and 0.12 square miles (0.31 km^{2}) (or 0.48%) is water. The streams of Boots Creek, Deer Creek, Lugar Creek, Massey Creek and Walnut Creek run through this township.

=== Cities and towns ===
- Marion (east half)
- Gas City (north edge)

=== Unincorporated towns ===
- Bethevan
- Brookhaven
- Dooville
- Home Corner
- Lake Wood
- Shady Hills

(This list is based on USGS data and may include former settlements.)

=== Adjacent townships ===
- Washington Township (north)
- Van Buren Township (northeast)
- Monroe Township (east)
- Mill Township (south)
- Franklin Township (west)
- Pleasant Township (northwest)

=== Cemeteries ===
The township contains three cemeteries: Burson, Independent Order of Odd Fellows and Marion National.

=== Major highways ===
- SR 9
- SR 15
- SR 18
