= Van Buren Township, Grant County, Indiana =

Van Buren Township
- Township
- Seal

- Location of Van Buren Township in Grant County
- Coordinates: 40°36′31″N 85°30′17″W
- Country: United States
- State: Indiana
- County: Grant

Government
  - Type: Indiana township

Area
  - Total: 35.51 sq mi (92.0 km^{2})
  - Land: 35.48 sq mi (91.9 km^{2})
  - Water: 0.03 sq mi (0.078 km^{2}) 0.08%
- Elevation: 843 ft (257 m)

Population (2020)
  - Total: 1,836
  - Density: 54.5/sq mi (21.0/km^{2})
- GNIS feature ID: 0453946
- Website: Official website

Van Buren Township is one of thirteen townships in Grant County, Indiana, United States. As of the 2020 census, its population was 1,836 (down from 1,934 at 2010), and it contained 785 housing units.

== Geography ==
According to the 2010 census, the township has a total area of 35.51 square miles (92.0 km^{2}), of which 35.48 square miles (91.9 km^{2}) (or 99.92%) is land and 0.03 square miles (0.078 km^{2}) (or 0.08%) is water. The streams of Brushy Run, Little Black Creek and Roods Run run through this township.

=== Cities and towns ===
- Van Buren

=== Unincorporated towns ===
- Doyle Ferguson
- Farrville
- Landess (part)

(This list is based on USGS data and may include former settlements.)

=== Adjacent townships ===
- Jefferson Township, Huntington County (north)
- Salamonie Township, Huntington County (northeast)
- Jackson Township, Wells County (east)
- Washington Township, Blackford County (southeast)
- Monroe Township (south)
- Center Township (southwest)
- Washington Township (west)
- Wayne Township, Huntington County (northwest)

=== Cemeteries ===
The township contains six cemeteries: Cory, Doyle, Farrville, Landess, Lee and Masonic.

=== Major highways ===
- I-69
- SR 5

== Education ==
Van Buren Township residents may obtain a free library card from the Van Buren Public Library in Van Buren.
