= Monroe Township, Grant County, Indiana =

Monroe Township
- Township
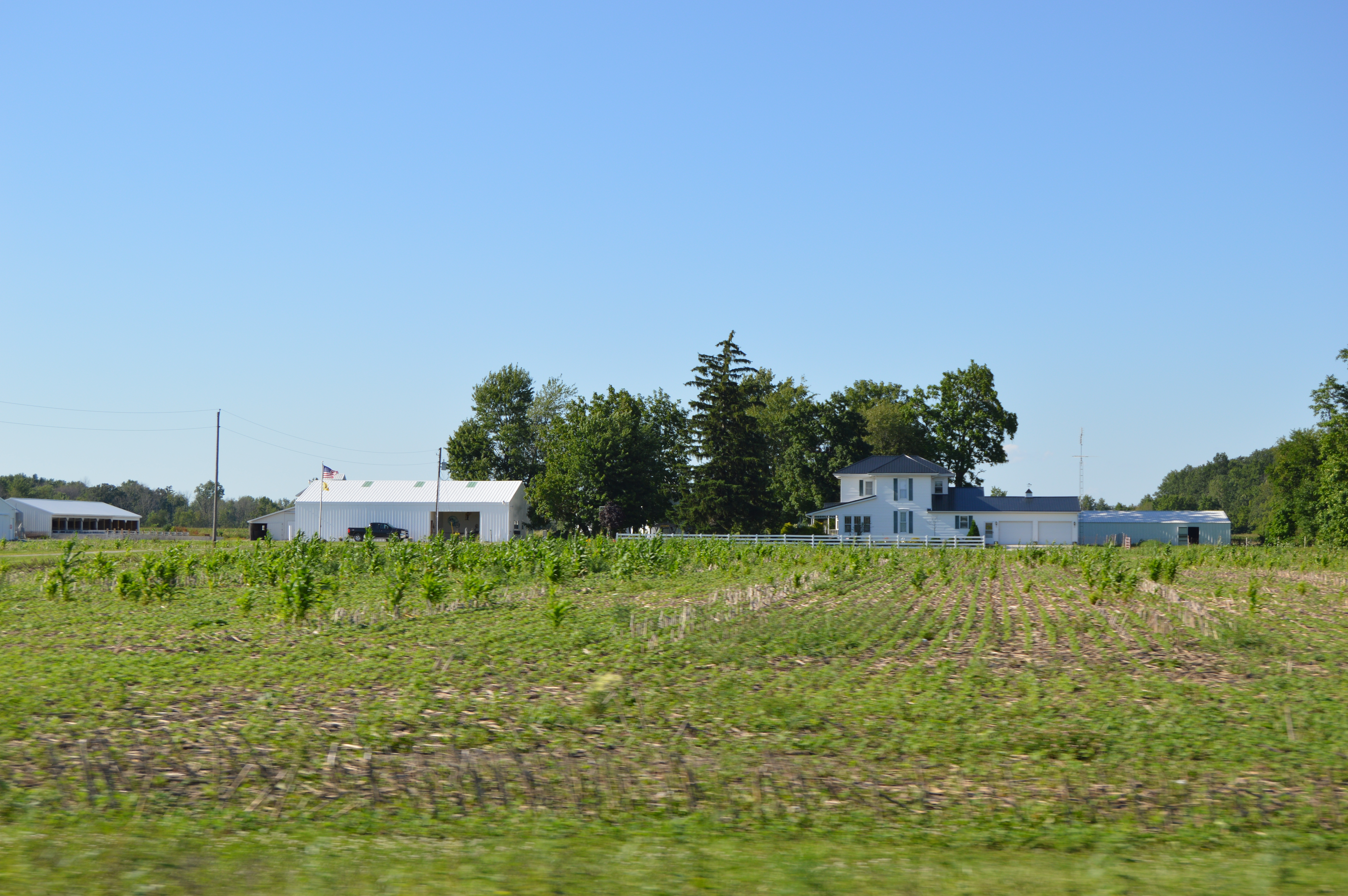
- Small farm scene on State Road 18 east of Marion

- Location of Monroe Township in Grant County
- Coordinates: 40°31′51″N 85°29′59″W
- Country: United States
- State: Indiana
- County: Grant

Government
  - Type: Indiana township

Area
  - Total: 35.55 sq mi (92.1 km^{2})
  - Land: 35.51 sq mi (92.0 km^{2})
  - Water: 0.05 sq mi (0.13 km^{2}) 0.14%
- Elevation: 869 ft (265 m)

Population (2020)
  - Total: 1,649
  - Density: 47.2/sq mi (18.2/km^{2})
- GNIS feature ID: 0453638

Monroe Township is one of thirteen townships in Grant County, Indiana, United States. As of the 2010 census, its population was 1,677 and it contained 669 housing units.

== History ==
The Israel Jenkins House was listed on the National Register of Historic Places in 2003.

== Geography ==
According to the 2010 census, the township has a total area of 35.55 square miles (92.1 km^{2}), of which 35.51 square miles (92.0 km^{2}) (or 99.89%) is land and 0.05 square miles (0.13 km^{2}) (or 0.14%) is water. Lakes in this township include Lake Marion. The streams of Ball Run, Club Run, Little Walnut Creek, Monroe Prairie Creek and Sports Run run through this township.

=== Cities and towns ===
- Marion (the county seat)
- Gas City (east edge)

=== Unincorporated towns ===
- Friendly Corner

(This list is based on USGS data and may include former settlements.)

=== Adjacent townships ===
- Van Buren Township (north)
- Jackson Township, Wells County (northeast)
- Washington Township, Blackford County (east)
- Licking Township, Blackford County (southeast)
- Jefferson Township (south)
- Center Township (west)
- Mill Township (west)
- Washington Township (northwest)

=== Cemeteries ===
The township contains one cemetery, Atkinson.

=== Major highways ===
- I-69
- SR 5
- SR 18
- SR 22

== Education ==
Monroe Township residents may obtain a free library card from the Barton Rees Pogue Memorial Public Library in Upland.
