= Mary Eleanor Spear =

American statistician

- from her books
- Born: Mary Eleanor Hunt; March 4, 1897; Jonesboro, Indiana
- Died: January 22, 1986 (aged 88)
- Occupation: Statistician
- Spouse: Albert Austin Spear (m. 1921)

Mary Eleanor Hunt Spear (March 4, 1897 – January 22, 1986) was an American data visualization specialist and author, known in part for devising an early version of the box plot.

== Early life and education ==
Mary Eleanor Hunt was born in Jonesboro, Indiana, the daughter of Amos Zophar Hunt and Mabel Elizabeth Ewry Hunt. She attended Peabody Elementary School, Washington D.C., followed by Eastern High School. She then studied at Strayer's Business College and George Washington University. She married Albert Austin Spear in September 1921.

== Career ==
Spear worked as a graphic analyst for many United States Federal Government agencies between the 1920s and the 1960s, including for the Internal Revenue Service and the Bureau of Labor Statistics. She also operated her own studio for 22 years, and taught Graphic Representation of Statistics at the American University. She wrote two books, Charting Statistics in 1952 and Practical Charting Techniques in 1969, which described detailed techniques to design and create various types of statistical charts and graphs. She also explained the roles needed for successful development and presentation of charts: a graphic analyst, a draftsman, and a communicator. The same team-based approach is recommended by 21st century author and presentations expert Nancy Duarte.

Spear has been recognised, by statisticians Edward Tufte and Hadley Wickham among others, as having presented the first formulation of the box plot. This was shown in Charting Statistics , which on page 166 shows a diagram of a range bar chart featuring an interquartile range box. The box plot was further developed seventeen years later by American mathematician John Tukey.

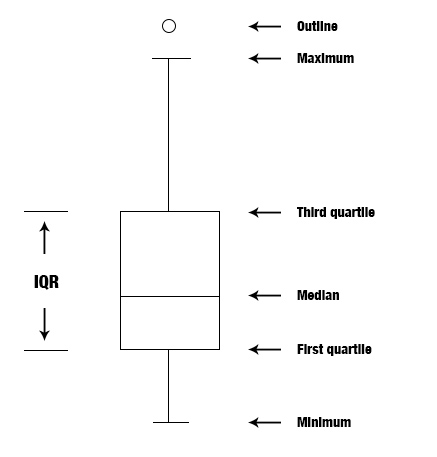
Box plot nomenclature

Reviewers of her first book noted approvingly Spear's inclusion of tips about presenting data in graphic form on television. Several reviewers felt that the book could have been longer, that more instructions about equipment and tools would have been useful, that the explanations were too short, and, although they were "thankful for a book containing many excellent illustrations, [were] regretful that author Spear did not impart more of her fund of knowledge." An Italian reviewer felt it would be very successful in popularising the basic types of graphic data displays, while a French reviewer thought that economics teachers, administrators and entrepreneurs would all benefit from reading it. A review in Journal of Marketing highlighted three rules: "keep the presentations simple ... know your audience, know your material." The Analysts Journal pointed out that, as well as being useful to those needing to create their own presentations of statistical information, it would be valuable for assessing those made by others.

Spear's second book was an updated version of her first. It was also longer, although at least one reviewer still thought that parts were too short. It contained a chapter titled, "Cheating by Charting", on how not to mislead an audience, but made no reference to the growing field of plotting data by computer.

== Works ==
- 1952 Charting Statistics
- 1969 Practical Charting Techniques
