= Franklin Township, Grant County, Indiana =

Franklin Township
- Township
- Location of Franklin Township in Grant County
- Coordinates: 40°31′23″N 85°43′51″W
- Country: United States
- State: Indiana
- County: Grant

Government
  - Type: Indiana township

Area
  - Total: 36.07 sq mi (93.4 km^{2})
  - Land: 36.06 sq mi (93.4 km^{2})
  - Water: 0.01 sq mi (0.026 km^{2}) 0.03%
- Elevation: 843 ft (257 m)

Population (2020)
  - Total: 7,082
  - Density: 200/sq mi (77/km^{2})
- GNIS feature ID: 0453302

Franklin Township is one of thirteen townships in Grant County, Indiana, United States. As of the 2010 census, its population was 7,211 and it contained 3,553 housing units.

== Geography ==
According to the 2010 census, the township has a total area of 36.07 square miles (93.4 km^{2}), of which 36.06 square miles (93.4 km^{2}) (or 99.97%) is land and 0.01 square miles (0.026 km^{2}) (or 0.03%) is water. Lakes in this township include Crane Pond. The stream of Bell Creek runs through this township.

=== Cities and towns ===
- Marion (west quarter)
- Sweetser (southeast quarter)

=== Unincorporated towns ===
- Herbst
- Kiley
- Michaelsville
- Roseburg
- Westwood Square

(This list is based on USGS data and may include former settlements.)

=== Adjacent townships ===
- Pleasant Township (north)
- Center Township (east)
- Mill Township (east)
- Liberty Township (south)
- Green Township (southwest)
- Sims Township (west)
- Richland Township (northwest)

=== Cemeteries ===
The township contains two cemeteries: Grant Memorial Park and Rowland.

=== Major highways ===
- US 35
- SR 9
- SR 15
- SR 18
- SR 37

=== Airports and landing strips ===
- Marion Municipal Airport

== Bibliography ==
- "Franklin Township, Grant County, Indiana". Geographic Names Information System. United States Geological Survey, United States Department of the Interior.
- United States Census Bureau cartographic boundary files
