= Shady Hills, Indiana =

Neighborhood in Indiana, United States

Coordinates: 40°35′22″N 85°40′27″W

Shady Hills is a neighborhood just north of Marion, Indiana in Grant County, Indiana. Like Marion, it is right off of Interstate 69. It was built throughout the 1940s and 1950s on the rolling hills just north of town. There is a golf course (Shady Hills Golf Club) adjoining the neighborhood. Nearby churches include First Friends and First Christian (Disciples of Christ). Marion's Matter Park is also very close. Originally children from Shady Hills attended Oak Hill Schools, but they now attend Marion Community Schools.

A notable architectural attraction is the Dr. Richard Davis House, "Woodside" designed by Frank Lloyd Wright located on Overlook Drive that runs through Shady Hills from Indiana 15 to North River Drive. Dr. Davis and his wife Madelyn Pugh (a writer for the I Love lucy TV show) had the home built, but after a short stay in Indiana, opted to move permanently to the west coast.

Shady hills is also about 30 miles east of the Kokomo Metropolitan Area
