= USS Mississinewa (AO-59) =

Oiler of the United States Navy

Coordinates: 9°58′44.22″N 139°39′45.43″E

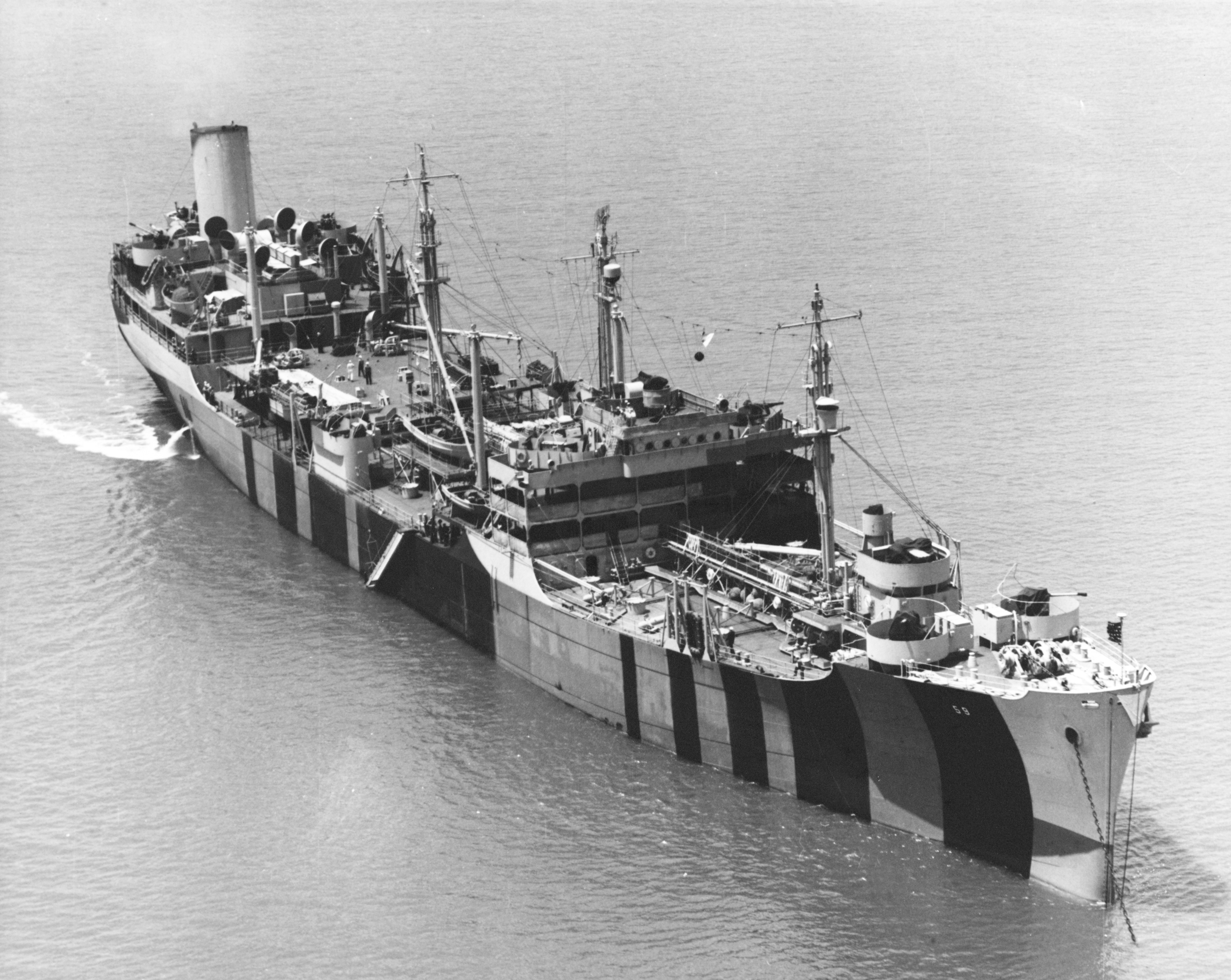
- The USS Mississinewa in May 1944.

History

United States
- Name: USS Mississinewa
- Namesake: Mississinewa River in Indiana
- Builder: Bethlehem Sparrows Point Shipyard
- Laid down: 5 October 1943
- Launched: 28 March 1944
- Commissioned: 19 May 1944
- Honors and awards: 4 battle stars (WWII)
- Fate: Sunk by Japanese Kaiten manned torpedo off the western Caroline Islands on 20 November 1944

General characteristics
- Class & type: Cimarron-class fleet replenishment oiler
- Type: T3-S2-A1 tanker
- Displacement: 25,425 long tons (25,833 t)
- Length: 553 ft (169 m)
- Beam: 75 ft (23 m)
- Draft: 32 ft (9.8 m)
- Installed power: 30,400 shp (22,700 kW)
- Propulsion: 2 × geared steam turbines; 2 × shafts
- Speed: 18 kn (33 km/h; 21 mph)
- Capacity: 146,000 barrels (23,200 m^{3})
- Complement: 21 officers and 278 enlisted
- Armament: 2 × 5 in (130 mm)/38 cal dual-purpose gun (1x2); 4 × 3-inch/50-caliber guns; 4 × 40 mm anti-aircraft guns; 4 × 20 mm anti-aircraft cannons

USS Mississinewa (AO-59) was the first of two United States Navy ships of the name. She was a T3-S2-A1 auxiliary oiler of the US Navy, laid down on 5 October 1943 by the Bethlehem Sparrows Point Shipyard, Inc., Sparrows Point, Maryland; launched on 28 March 1944; sponsored by Miss Margaret Pence; and commissioned on 18 May 1944. Mississinewa was commanded by Captain Philip G. Beck. The ship is named for the Mississinewa River of eastern Indiana.

== World War II ==
Mississinewa began her brief but active wartime service on 18 May 1944. Having completed shakedown in the Chesapeake Bay, she sailed for Aruba, Netherland West Indies, to take on her first cargo. Filling her cargo tanks on 23–24 June she continued on to the Pacific Ocean, arriving Pearl Harbor on 10 July. As a unit of Service Squadron 10 (ServRon 10), she then steamed to Eniwetok where she first fueled ships of the 3rd Fleet. On 25 August, she got underway for Manus where she supplied fuel and stores and delivered mail to ships of TF 38, the fast carrier force, 32 and 31 during the assault and occupation of the Palaus.

Returning to Manus on 30 September, she replenished her tanks and again headed north to refuel TF 38 as that force struck at Japanese shipping and shore installations in the Philippines, on Taiwan, and in the Ryukyus in preparation for the Philippine campaign. On 19 October, having emptied her tanks into ships scheduled to take part in the landings at Leyte, she sailed to Ulithi in the Caroline Islands, her new base. In early November, Mississinewa sailed her last fueling at sea assignment, returning on the 15th.

The next day, she replenished her cargo tanks, filling them almost to capacity with 404,000 US gallons (1,530 m^{3}) of aviation gas, 9,000 barrels (1,400 m^{3}) of diesel fuel, and 90,000 barrels (14,000 m^{3}) of fuel oil. Four days later, 20 November, she was still anchored in berth No. 131. At 05:47, shortly after reveille, a heavy explosion rocked the oiler. Seconds later, fumes in an aviation gas cargo tank ignited, causing a second explosion. Massive flames immediately burst from midship forward. Bunker C oil immediately engulfed the ship, with aviation gas on top of that. The aviation gas acted like a wick. Fanned by a light wind, the fire spread aft quickly. A few minutes later the fires reached the after magazine and caused yet another explosion to tear through the ship. The ship was abandoned and soon enveloped in flames over 100 ft (30 m) high. Fleet tugs were immediately brought in to try to extinguish the fire, but in spite of their efforts, at about 09:00 the ship slowly turned over and disappeared. Fifteen minutes later, the fire on the water was out and Ulithi anchorage was again quiet. This ship was the first to be hit by a Japanese Kaiten manned torpedo. The ship sank with a loss of 63 hands as well as the kaiten pilot.

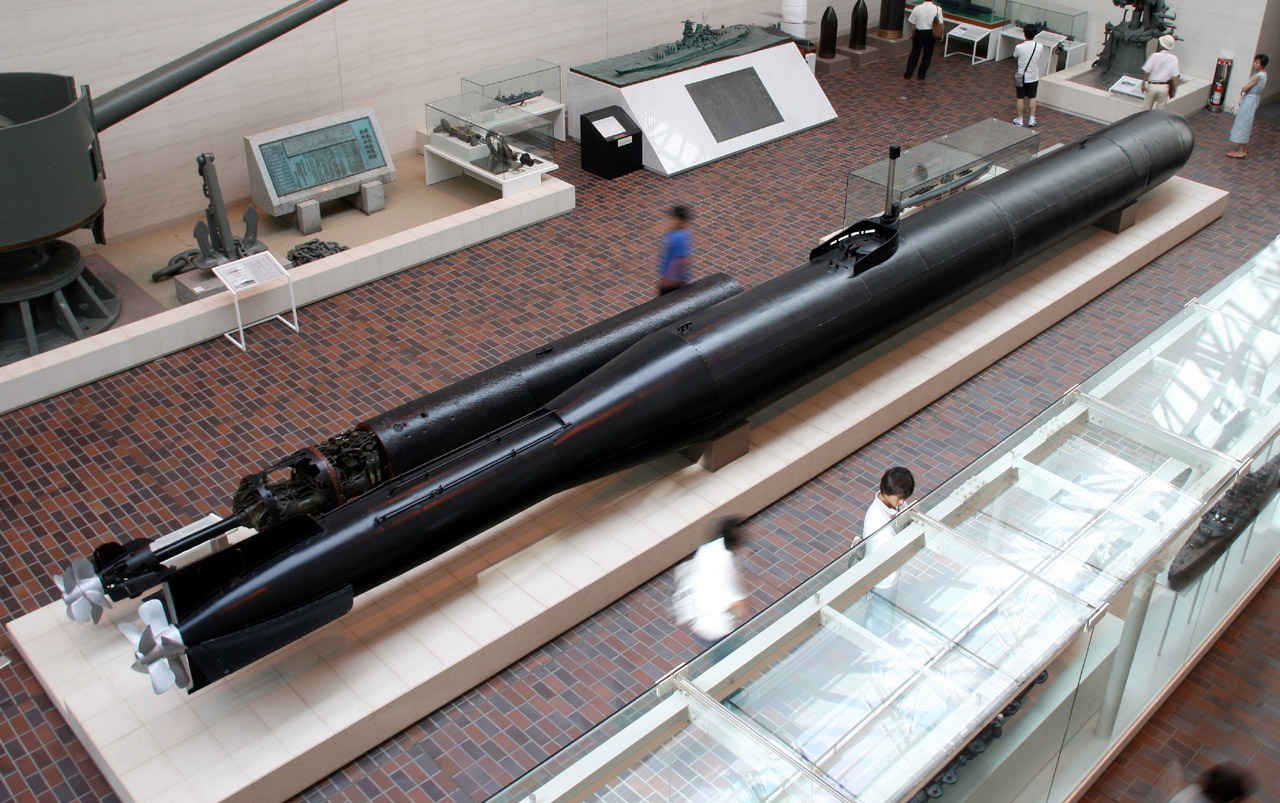
A Kaiten on display at Yasukuni Jinja, Tokyo

Of the five kaiten sent against US ships, only one was successful, but the explosion and fire from Mississinewa was so great that the Japanese Naval Command back in Tokyo were erroneously informed that three aircraft carriers were hit. This resulted in an expansion of the kaiten program, even though it would not significantly affect the war. Mississinewa was hit in the front starboard bow area, the kaiten probably released by Japanese submarine I-47 just outside Ulithi lagoon.

Mississinewa received four battle stars for World War II service.

== Discovery of shipwreck ==
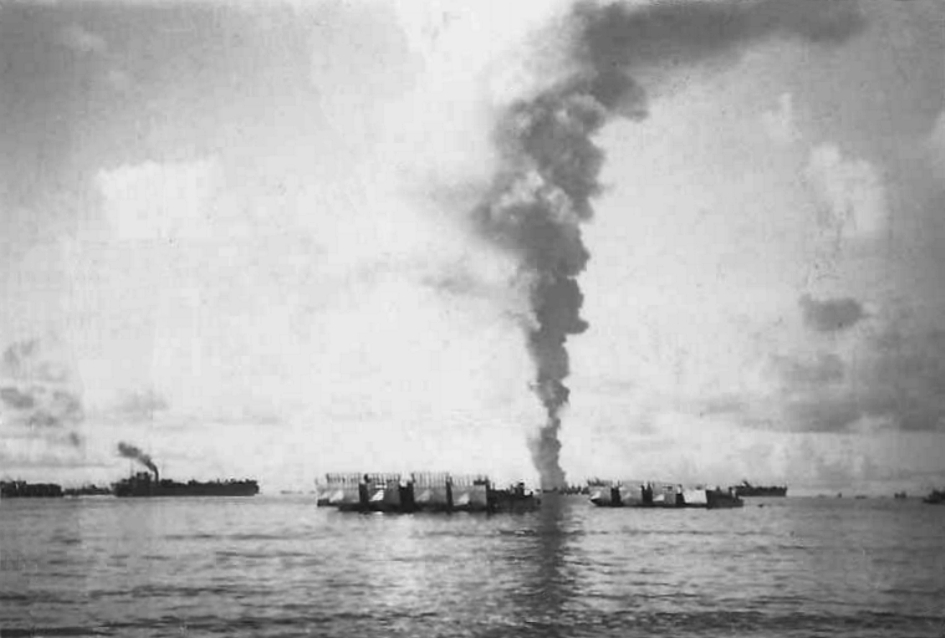
Mississinewa sinking

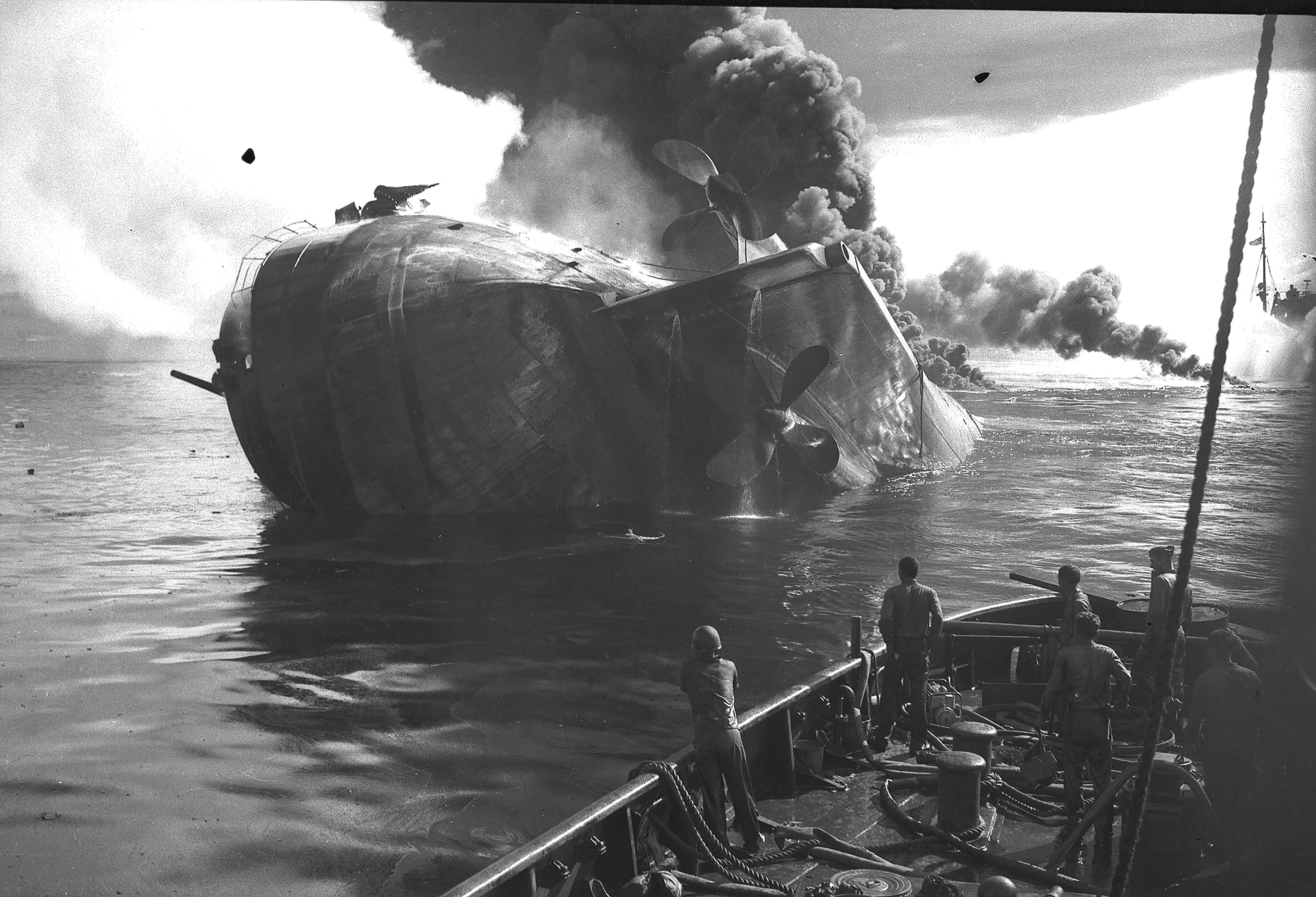
Mississinewa sinking on 20 November 1944

The Mississinewa remained undiscovered in a tropical lagoon of Yap State for over 56 years. On 6 April 2001, the hulk of the shipwreck was found by adventure divers at a depth of 132 feet (40 m) roughly 7/10 mile (1.1 km) north of Mogmog Island, Ulithi, Micronesia. For two months, from July 2001 to August, the sunken wreck leaked oil into the Ulithi lagoon. Officials estimated that 18,000 to 24,000 gallons of oil had been released over the course of two months, threatening coral reefs, sea turtle breeding grounds, and local fishing. Following a typhoon, the island's beaches and the lagoon were contaminated by heavy fuel oil leaking from the wreck.

A state of emergency was declared by the Governor of Yap. The Environmental Protection Agency and the Yap Marine Resources Department imposed a ban on fishing in the lagoon. In September 2001, a dive team and contractors hired by the U.S. Navy led a survey to determine the status of the wreck and the potential for environmental damage from the deteriorating hulk. Divers confirmed leaks, finding cracks in two of the Mississinewa's tanks. A second oil leak from the oiler was reported in December 2001 and leaks were plugged in February 2002. An investigation by the South Pacific Regional Environment Programme found that the estimated 5,000,000 gallons of oil remaining in the wreck constituted an "unacceptable and ever present risk". The potential for a large release of the tanker's cargo fuel made a recovery attempt necessary.

In February 2003, a US Navy salvage team led an expedition to recover as much oil as possible. Divers used "hot taps" to drill into the oil tanks and removed all accessible oil, nearly 2 million US gallons (7,600 m^{3}), rendering the wreck safer. The recovered oil was barged back to Singapore, where it was sold for $0.50/gallon to help cover the $11 million salvage costs.

The ship was featured on the television shows The Sea Hunters, Deep Sea Detectives, and Dogfights.
