= Van Buren Popcorn Festival =

Annual festival in August in Van Buren, Indiana

Coordinates: 40°37′1″N 85°30′23″W

The annual Van Buren Popcorn Festival is a festival held each August, typically during the 1st or 2nd full Thursday, Friday and Saturday of the month, in Van Buren, Indiana. The festival is held in celebration of the central role of popcorn to the town. As with many small town festivals, Van Buren's focuses on a theme that has meaning to the community. First held in 1973, the Popcorn Festival has become a homecoming event to many "expatriate" residents of this small community.

Since 2020, strict measures are undertaken, such as wearing masks & social distancing.

== Schedule ==
Whilst the schedule varies each year it usually tends to follow a similar pattern:

Thursday:

- evening: Boy Scouts Popcorn tent opens, serving popped popcorn; centerpiece of the town "midway" of fair booths and kiddie rides
- evening: many food and craft booths
- 6:30 p.m. Parade
  - hundreds of units participate, including area school bands, civic clubs, first responder volunteers and so forth
  - a frequent highlight of the parade is antique cars and antique tractors
  - the 50-year reunion class of the Van Buren High School rides a float in parade each year
- late evening: entertainment on the stage

Friday:

- afternoon and evening: Boy Scouts popcorn tent opens
- afternoon and evening: food and crafts vendors
- late afternoon: children's bicycle parade
- early evening: pet parade
- evening until late: open-air concert downtown

Saturday:

- early morning: volunteer fire department pancake & sausage breakfast
- early morning: "Fun Run" and 5K "Kernel Classic" run
- all day: civic and festival events
  - Free Cholesterol Testing
  - food and craft vendors
  - Fincannon Memorial Car and Motorcycle Show
- Cornhole Tournament
- afternoon: Boy Scouts Popcorn Tent
- afternoon: Children's Biblical Festival at the United Methodist Church Annex
- late afternoon: Baby Parade
- evening until late: open-air concert downtown
