= Pleasant Township, Grant County, Indiana =

Pleasant Township
- Township
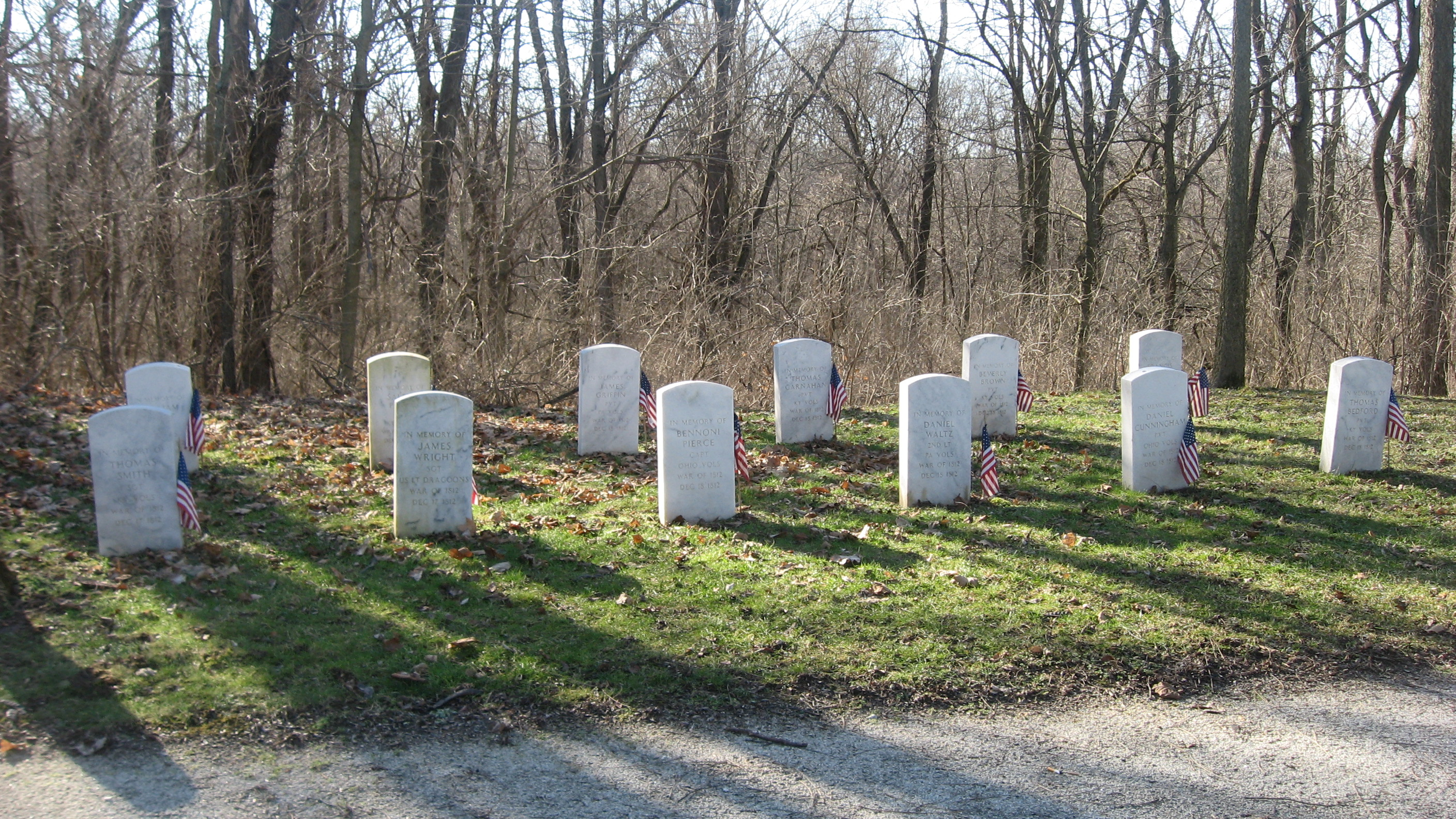
- Cemetery at the Mississinewa Battlefield

- Location of Pleasant Township in Grant County
- Coordinates: 40°36′42″N 85°44′00″W
- Country: United States
- State: Indiana
- County: Grant

Government
  - Type: Indiana township

Area
  - Total: 35.11 sq mi (90.9 km^{2})
  - Land: 34.83 sq mi (90.2 km^{2})
  - Water: 0.28 sq mi (0.73 km^{2}) 0.80%
- Elevation: 827 ft (252 m)

Population (2020)
  - Total: 7,023
  - Density: 195.1/sq mi (75.3/km^{2})
- GNIS feature ID: 0453745

Pleasant Township is one of thirteen townships in Grant County, Indiana, United States. As of the 2010 census, its population was 6,797 and it contained 3,166 housing units.

== History ==
The Meshingomesia Cemetery and Indian School Historic District was listed on the National Register of Historic Places in 2013.

== Geography ==
According to the 2010 census, the township has a total area of 35.11 square miles (90.9 km^{2}), of which 34.83 square miles (90.2 km^{2}) (or 99.20%) is land and 0.28 square miles (0.73 km^{2}) (or 0.80%) is water. The stream of Jocinah Creek runs through this township.

=== Cities and towns ===
- Marion (northwest edge)
- Sweetser (northeast three-quarters)

=== Unincorporated towns ===
- Jalapa

(This list is based on USGS data and may include former settlements.)

=== Adjacent townships ===
- Liberty Township, Wabash County (north)
- Washington Township (east)
- Center Township (southeast)
- Franklin Township (south)
- Sims Township (southwest)
- Richland Township (west)
- Waltz Township, Wabash County (northwest)

=== Cemeteries ===
The township contains two cemeteries: Maple Grove and Meshingomesia.

=== Major highways ===
- SR 15
- SR 18
