= Washington Township, Grant County, Indiana =

Washington Township
- Township
- Location of Washington Township in Grant County
- Coordinates: 40°37′02″N 85°37′01″W
- Country: United States
- State: Indiana
- County: Grant

Government
  - Type: Indiana township

Area
  - Total: 34.29 sq mi (88.8 km^{2})
  - Land: 34.14 sq mi (88.4 km^{2})
  - Water: 0.16 sq mi (0.41 km^{2}) 0.47%
- Elevation: 843 ft (257 m)

Population (2020)
  - Total: 3,433
  - Density: 111.4/sq mi (43.0/km^{2})
- GNIS feature ID: 0453996
- Website: washingtontownship.in

Washington Township is one of thirteen townships in Grant County, Indiana, United States. As of the 2020 census, its population was 3,433 (down from 3,803 at 2010) and it contained 1,636 housing units.

== History ==
The Dr. Richard Davis House was listed on the National Register of Historic Places in 1997.

== Geography ==
According to the 2010 census, the township has a total area of 34.29 square miles (88.8 km^{2}), of which 34.14 square miles (88.4 km^{2}) (or 99.56%) is land and 0.16 square miles (0.41 km^{2}) (or 0.47%) is water. The streams of Big Lick Creek and Hummel Creek run through this township.

=== Cities and towns ===
- Marion (northeast edge)

=== Unincorporated towns ===
- Hanfield
- Landess
- Shadeland

(This list is based on USGS data and may include former settlements.)

=== Adjacent townships ===
- Wayne Township, Huntington County (north)
- Jefferson Township, Huntington County (northeast)
- Van Buren Township (east)
- Monroe Township (southeast)
- Center Township (south)
- Pleasant Township (west)
- Liberty Township, Wabash County (northwest)

=== Cemeteries ===
The township contains three cemeteries: Fairview, Hummel-Lobdell and Salem.

=== Major highways ===
- SR 9
