= Van Buren, Indiana =

- Town
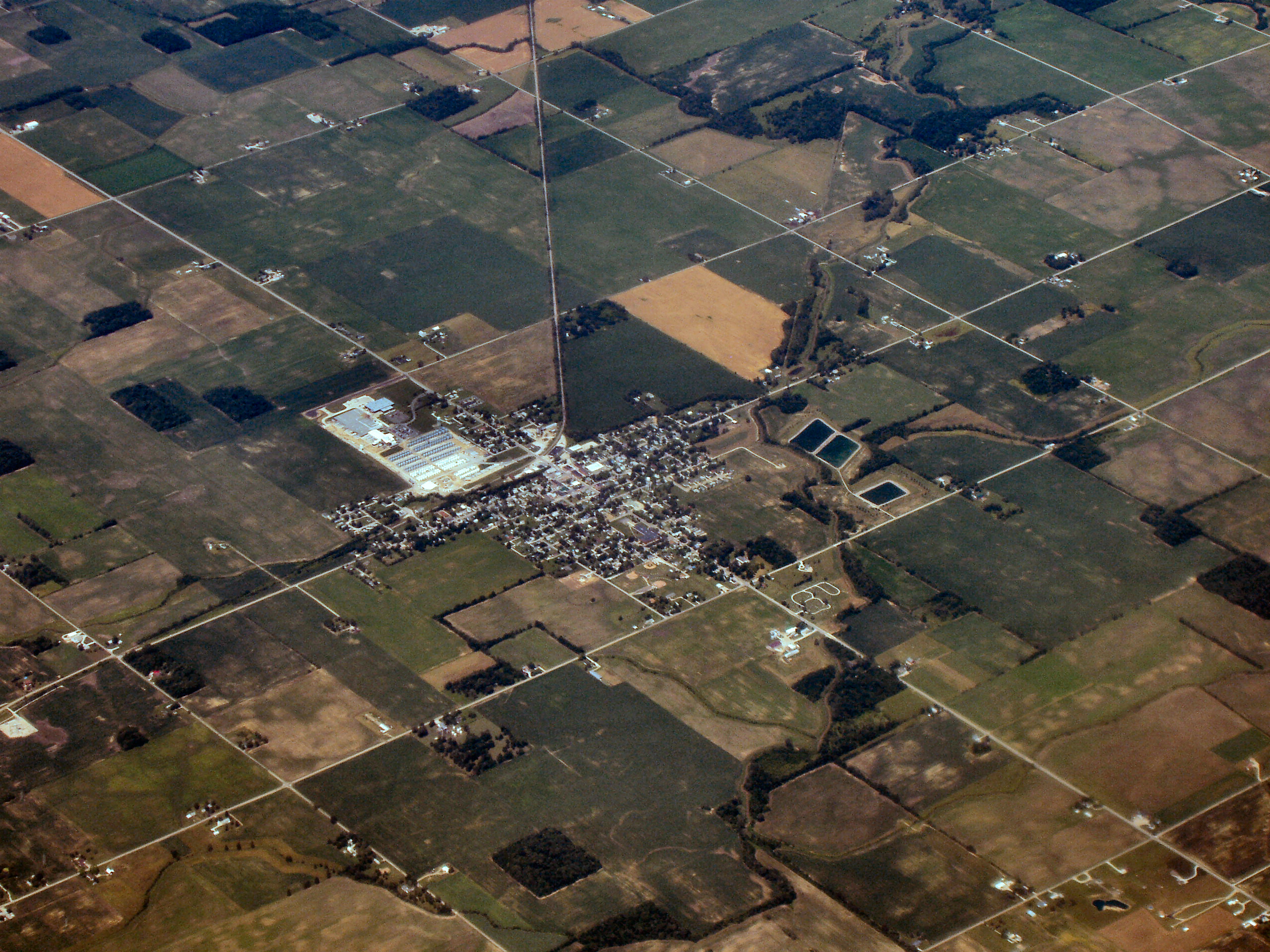
- Van Buren from the air, looking northeast.
- Motto: "The Popcorn Capital Of The World"
- Location of Van Buren in Grant County, Indiana.
- Coordinates: 40°36′53″N 85°30′03″W
- Country: United States
- State: Indiana
- County: Grant
- Township: Van Buren

Area
  - Total: 0.58 sq mi (1.51 km^{2})
  - Land: 0.58 sq mi (1.51 km^{2})
  - Water: 0 sq mi (0.00 km^{2})
- Elevation: 843 ft (257 m)

Population (2020)
  - Total: 790
  - Density: 1,354.5/sq mi (522.96/km^{2})
- Time zone: UTC-5 (Eastern (EST))
  - Summer (DST): UTC-4 (EDT)
- ZIP code: 46991
- Area code: 765
- FIPS code: 18-78470
- GNIS feature ID: 2397709
- Website: vanburenindiana.org

Van Buren is a town in Van Buren Township, Grant County, Indiana, United States. As of the 2020 census, Van Buren had a population of 790.

== History ==
Joseph Boxell platted Van Buren Township in 1837. Martin Van Buren was the United States president at the time. In 1843 George H. D. Rood settled here and the creek that runs through the town was called Roods Run. As the area grew and developed it was called many names including Roods Corner, Roods Town, Roods Crossroads and Stringtown. In 1888 C.W. platted the area and it was known as Van Buren. In June 1892 the town became incorporated by the state of Indiana.

== Geography ==
According to the 2010 census, Van Buren has a total area of 0.58 square miles (1.50 km^{2}), all land.

== Demographics ==
Historical population
Census	Pop.	Note	%±
1880	124		—
1900	965		—
1910	1,189		23.2%
1920	861		−27.6%
1930	766		−11.0%
1940	825		7.7%
1950	815		−1.2%
1960	929		14.0%
1970	1,057		13.8%
1980	935		−11.5%
1990	934		−0.1%
2000	935		0.1%
2010	864		−7.6%
2020	790		−8.6%
U.S. Decennial Census

=== 2010 census ===
As of the census of 2010, there were 864 people, 357 households, and 241 families living in the town. The population density was 1,489.7 inhabitants per square mile (575.2/km^{2}). There were 401 housing units at an average density of 691.4 per square mile (267.0/km^{2}). The racial makeup of the town was 98.0% White, 0.2% Native American, 0.3% Asian, 0.3% from other races, and 1.0% from two or more races. Hispanic or Latino of any race were 0.9% of the population.

There were 357 households, of which 35.0% had children under the age of 18 living with them, 44.0% were married couples living together, 17.4% had a female householder with no husband present, 6.2% had a male householder with no wife present, and 32.5% were non-families. 30.0% of all households were made up of individuals, and 11.5% had someone living alone who was 65 years of age or older. The average household size was 2.42 and the average family size was 2.96.

The median age in the town was 38.6 years. 26.6% of residents were under the age of 18; 7.5% were between the ages of 18 and 24; 25.3% were from 25 to 44; 26.8% were from 45 to 64; and 13.8% were 65 years of age or older. The gender makeup of the town was 47.0% male and 53.0% female.

=== 2000 census ===
As of the census of 2000, there were 935 people, 371 households, and 264 families living in the town. The population density was 1,599.8 inhabitants per square mile (617.7/km^{2}). There were 394 housing units at an average density of 674.1 per square mile (260.3/km^{2}). The racial makeup of the town was 97.33% White, 0.11% African American, 0.21% Native American, 0.21% Asian, 0.86% from other races, and 1.28% from two or more races. Hispanic or Latino of any race were 1.39% of the population.

There were 371 households, out of which 34.8% had children under the age of 18 living with them, 54.2% were married couples living together, 12.7% had a female householder with no husband present, and 28.8% were non-families. 25.3% of all households were made up of individuals, and 13.7% had someone living alone who was 65 years of age or older. The average household size was 2.52 and the average family size was 2.98.

In the town, the population was spread out, with 28.8% under the age of 18, 6.7% from 18 to 24, 27.7% from 25 to 44, 21.4% from 45 to 64, and 15.4% who were 65 years of age or older. The median age was 35 years. For every 100 females, there were 94.0 males. For every 100 females age 18 and over, there were 85.5 males.

The median income for a household in the town was $36,719, and the median income for a family was $43,182. Males had a median income of $36,250 versus $21,111 for females. The per capita income for the town was $14,403. About 8.7% of families and 9.6% of the population were below the poverty line, including 14.6% of those under age 18 and 9.0% of those age 65 or over.

== Education ==
The town has a lending library, the Van Buren Public Library.

== Arts and culture ==
=== Annual cultural events ===
Van Buren bills itself as the "Popcorn Capital of the World." The largest local employer is the Weaver Popcorn Company; accordingly, its most famous annual event is the Popcorn Festival, held each August.

== Notable people ==
- Jared Lee, cartoonist
