= Jonesboro, Indiana =

City of Jonesboro, Indiana
- City
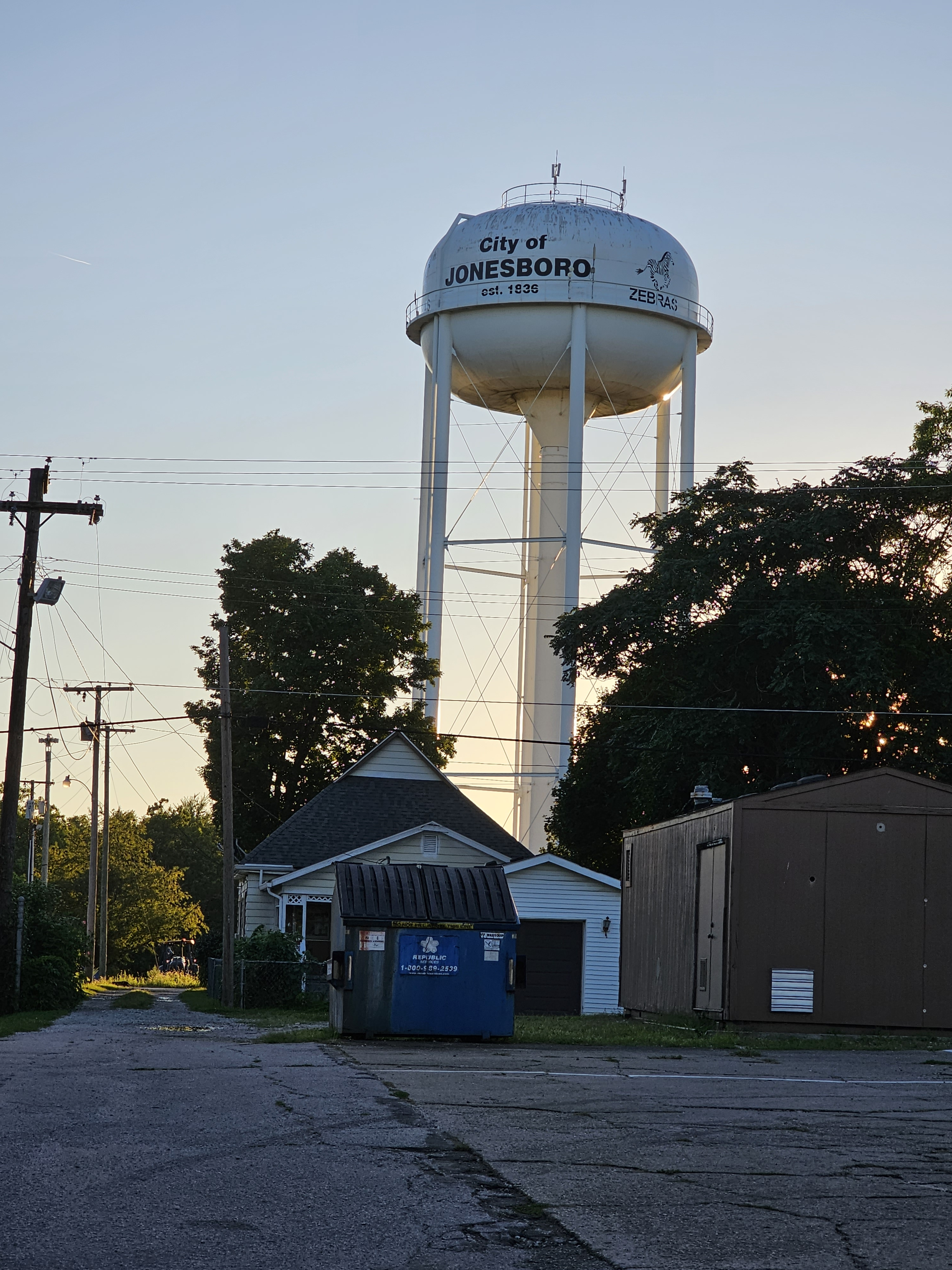

- Location of Jonesboro in Grant County, Indiana.
- Coordinates: 40°28′38″N 85°37′36″W
- Country: United States
- State: Indiana
- County: Grant
- Established: 1837

Government
  - Type: Mayor-council Government
  - Mayor: Bob Goins (R)

Area
  - Total: 0.89 sq mi (2.31 km^{2})
  - Land: 0.89 sq mi (2.31 km^{2})
  - Water: 0 sq mi (0.00 km^{2})
- Elevation: 830 ft (250 m)

Population (2020)
  - Total: 1,516
  - Estimate (2025): 1,510 ▼
  - Density: 1,697.9/sq mi (655.57/km^{2})
- Time zone: UTC-5 (EST)
  - Summer (DST): UTC-4 (EDT)
- ZIP code: 46938
- Area code: 765
- FIPS code: 18-38862
- GNIS feature ID: 2395479
- Website: www.jonesboroindiana.net

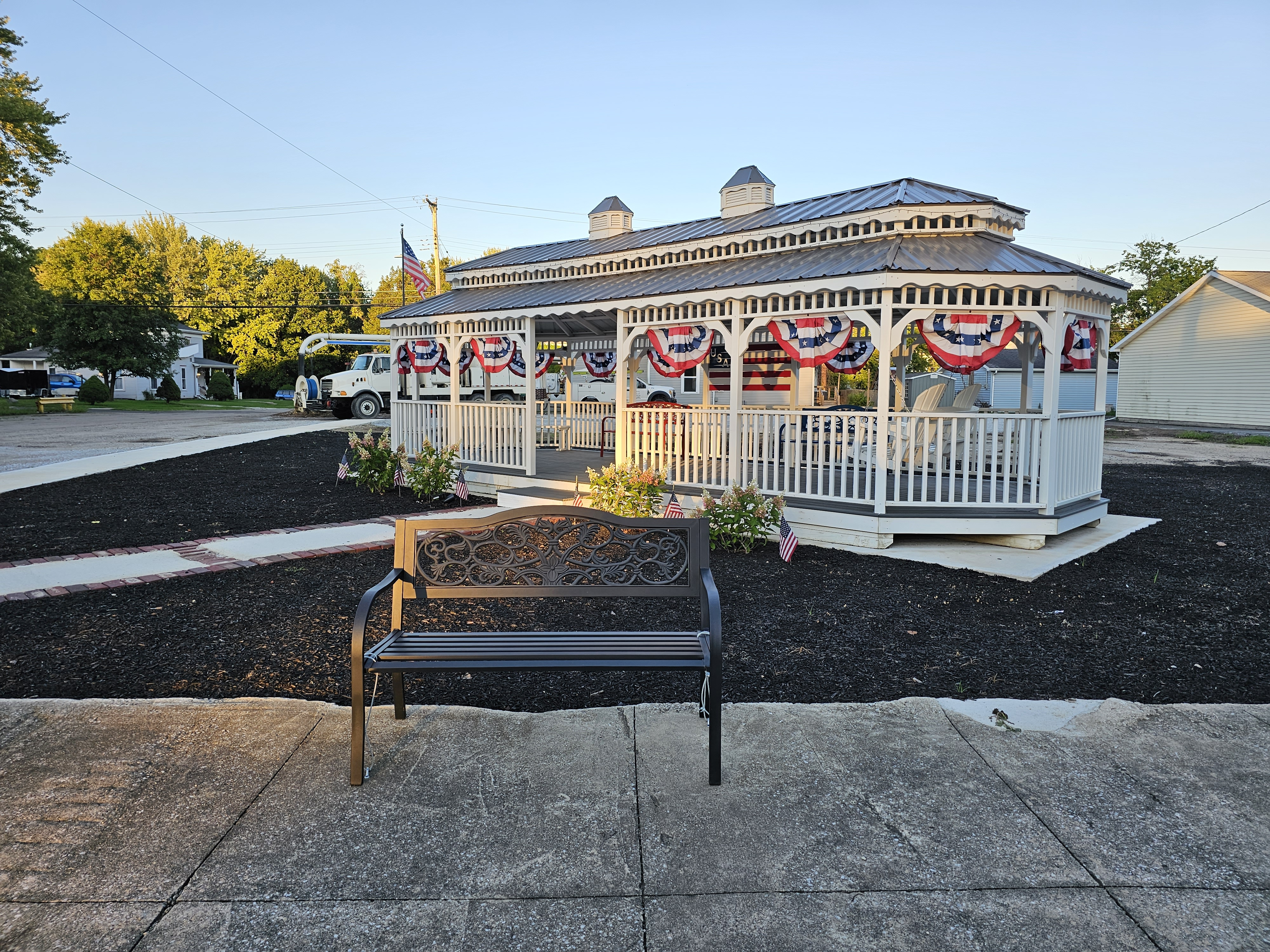
A Gazebo in Jonesboro, Indiana

Jonesboro (/ˈdʒoʊnzbʌrə/) is a city in Grant County, Indiana, United States, located along the Mississinewa River opposite Gas City. The population was 1,516 at the 2020 census. According to the 2010 census, Jonesboro had the third smallest population of a city in Indiana.

== History ==
Jonesboro was established in 1837 by Obadiah Jones, and named for him.

== Geography ==
According to the 2010 census, Jonesboro has a total area of 0.89 square miles (2.31 km^{2}), all land.

== City government ==
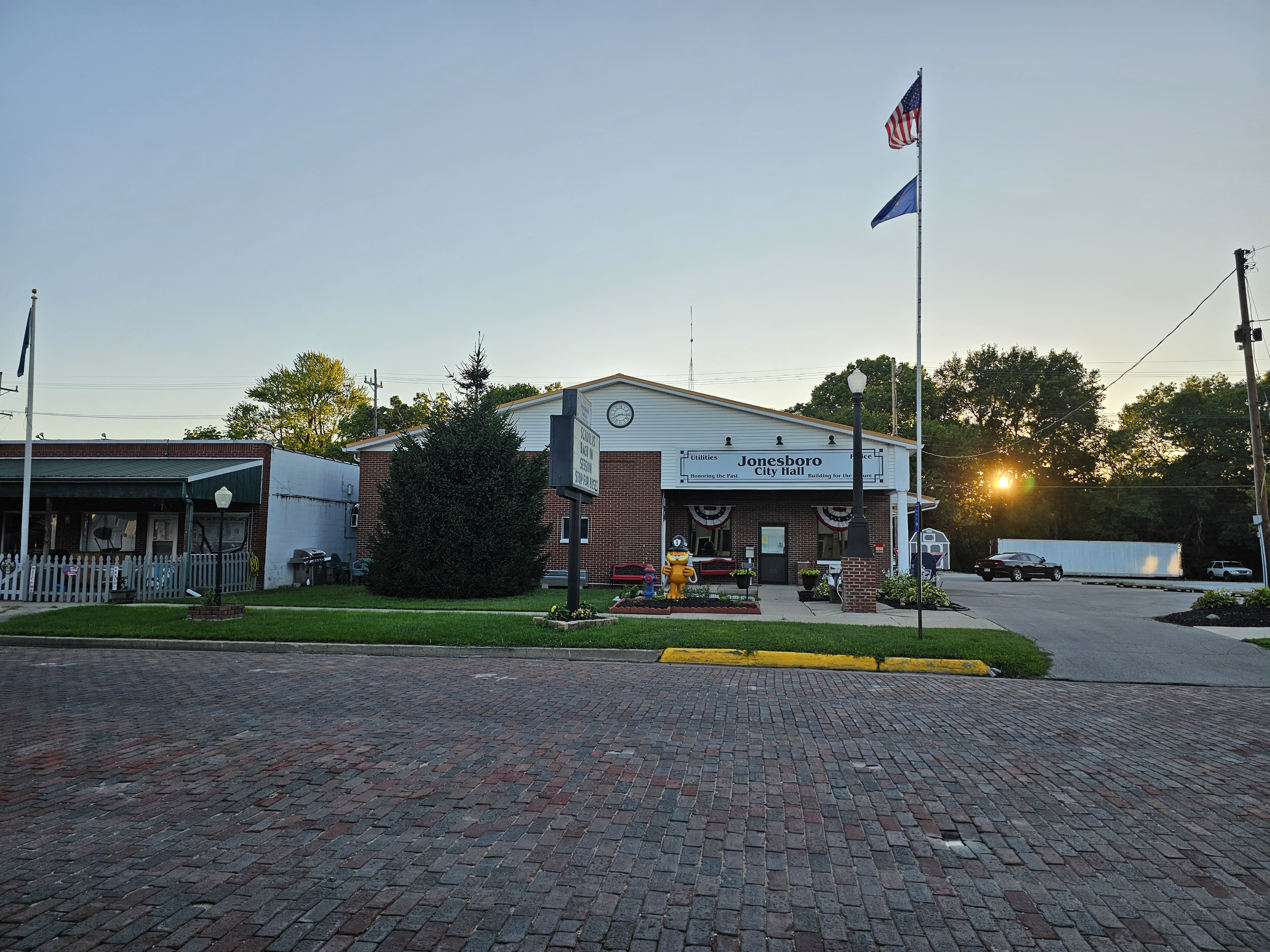
Jonesboro City Hall

The city is divided into 4 Wards, with a councilperson representing each ward and an additional councilperson at large. Citizens of Jonesboro also vote for their Clerk-Treasurer and City Attorney. The Mayor and the Council work together to govern the city.

== Demographics ==
Historical population
Census	Pop.	Note	%±
1850	288		—
1860	454		57.6%
1870	581		28.0%
1880	729		25.5%
1890	687		−5.8%
1900	1,838		167.5%
1910	1,573		−14.4%
1920	1,429		−9.2%
1930	1,496		4.7%
1940	1,791		19.7%
1950	1,973		10.2%
1960	2,260		14.5%
1970	2,466		9.1%
1980	2,279		−7.6%
1990	2,073		−9.0%
2000	1,887		−9.0%
2010	1,756		−6.9%
2020	1,516		−13.7%
2025 (est.)	1,510		−0.4%
U.S. Decennial Census

=== 2020 census ===
As of the 2020 census, Jonesboro had a population of 1,516. The median age was 41.6 years. 24.5% of residents were under the age of 18 and 18.3% of residents were 65 years of age or older. For every 100 females there were 94.9 males, and for every 100 females age 18 and over there were 85.9 males age 18 and over.

99.3% of residents lived in urban areas, while 0.7% lived in rural areas.

There were 625 households in Jonesboro, of which 30.9% had children under the age of 18 living in them. Of all households, 40.8% were married-couple households, 15.8% were households with a male householder and no spouse or partner present, and 33.3% were households with a female householder and no spouse or partner present. About 29.5% of all households were made up of individuals and 12.8% had someone living alone who was 65 years of age or older.

There were 707 housing units, of which 11.6% were vacant. The homeowner vacancy rate was 2.3% and the rental vacancy rate was 5.4%.

Racial composition as of the 2020 census
Race	Number	Percent
White	1,378	90.9%
Black or African American	14	0.9%
American Indian and Alaska Native	3	0.2%
Asian	6	0.4%
Native Hawaiian and Other Pacific Islander	0	0.0%
Some other race	13	0.9%
Two or more races	102	6.7%
Hispanic or Latino (of any race)	61	4.0%

=== 2010 census ===
As of the census of 2010, there were 1,756 people, 684 households, and 486 families living in the city. The population density was 1,973.0 inhabitants per square mile (761.8/km^{2}). There were 770 housing units at an average density of 865.2 per square mile (334.1/km^{2}). The racial makeup of the city was 97.7% White, 0.1% African American, 0.5% Native American, 0.6% from other races, and 1.2% from two or more races. Hispanic or Latino of any race were 2.4% of the population.

There were 684 households, of which 34.9% had children under the age of 18 living with them, 49.6% were married couples living together, 14.9% had a female householder with no husband present, 6.6% had a male householder with no wife present, and 28.9% were non-families. 23.8% of all households were made up of individuals, and 9.2% had someone living alone who was 65 years of age or older. The average household size was 2.57 and the average family size was 2.94.

The median age in the city was 39 years. 25.8% of residents were under the age of 18; 8.2% were between the ages of 18 and 24; 24.4% were from 25 to 44; 26.9% were from 45 to 64; and 14.9% were 65 years of age or older. The gender makeup of the city was 48.5% male and 51.5% female.

=== 2000 census ===
As of the census of 2000, there were 1,887 people, 768 households, and 545 families living in the city. The population density was 2,221.8 inhabitants per square mile (857.8/km^{2}). There were 817 housing units at an average density of 961.9 per square mile (371.4/km^{2}). The racial makeup of the city was 97.51% White, 0.16% African American, 0.26% Native American, 0.05% Asian, 1.01% from other races, and 1.01% from two or more races. Hispanic or Latino of any race were 1.75% of the population.

There were 768 households, out of which 32.4% had children under the age of 18 living with them, 54.6% were married couples living together, 12.8% had a female householder with no husband present, and 29.0% were non-families. 25.0% of all households were made up of individuals, and 8.2% had someone living alone who was 65 years of age or older. The average household size was 2.46 and the average family size was 2.91.

In the city, the population was spread out, with 25.4% under the age of 18, 7.6% from 18 to 24, 29.4% from 25 to 44, 24.3% from 45 to 64, and 13.3% who were 65 years of age or older. The median age was 37 years. For every 100 females, there were 90.2 males. For every 100 females age 18 and over, there were 90.1 males.

The median income for a household in the city was $36,974, and the median income for a family was $42,036. Males had a median income of $33,611 versus $21,042 for females. The per capita income for the city was $16,723. About 4.1% of families and 6.5% of the population were below the poverty line, including 6.2% of those under age 18 and 5.6% of those age 65 or over.

== Education ==
The city has a lending library, the Jonesboro Public Library. The city has two schools, one public and one private. Westview Elementary School is an Elementary school for students from Pre-School to 1st Grade and is a part of the Mississinewa School Corporation, which also features R.J. Baskett, Northview Elementary School, and Mississinewa High School in neighboring Gas City, Indiana. The King's Academy is a K-12 Christian school affiliated with the ACSI.

== Notable people ==
- John Harvey Baldwin, Minnesota state senator and lawyer
- Harry Knight, Indy car driver
- Mary Eleanor Spear, statistician
