= Mississinewa Lake Dam =

Dam and reservoir in Miami County, Indiana, U.S.

Mississinewa Lake
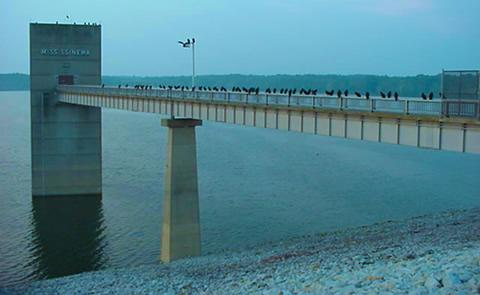
- Water Intake Tower at Mississinewa Lake Dam

- Location within Indiana Location within the United States
- Location: Miami County, Indiana
- Coordinates: 40°43′00″N 85°57′16″W
- Type: reservoir
- Etymology: Miami Language for "water on a slope".
- River sources: Mississinewa River
- Basin countries: United States
- Managing agency: United States Army Corps of Engineers
- Surface area: 3,180 acres (1,290 ha)
- Max. depth: 137 ft (42 m)
- Water volume: 368,400 acre⋅ft (454.4 hm^{3})
- Surface elevation: 725 feet (221 m)

Mississinewa Lake Dam is a dam in Miami County, Indiana, just outside the town of Peru, in the central part of the state.

== Authorization and construction ==
The dam was among those authorized by the 1958 Flood Control Act. The dam was designed and built by the Louisville district of the United States Army Corps of Engineers. The earthen dam was constructed from 1962 to 1967, with a height of 140 feet (43 m), and 8,000 feet (2,400 m) long at its crest. It impounds the Mississinewa River for irrigation storage and flood control. The dam is owned and operated by the Great Lakes and Ohio River Division of the Corps of Engineers.

== Reservoir ==
The reservoir it creates, Mississinewa Lake, has a normal water surface of five square miles (13 km^{2}), has a maximum capacity of 368,400 acre-feet (454,400,000 m^{3}), and a normal capacity of 75,200 acre-feet (92,800,000 m^{3}). Mississinewa Lake operates in conjunction with the J. Edward Roush and Salamonie lakes to prevent flooding downstream in the lower Wabash and Ohio rivers. Recreation includes fishing, boating, and swimming. Nearby recreation areas include the Miami State Recreation Area, the Red Bridge State Recreation Area, the Pearson Mill State Recreation Area, and the Frances Slocum State Recreation Area.
