= Grant County, Indiana =

County in Indiana, United States

- County
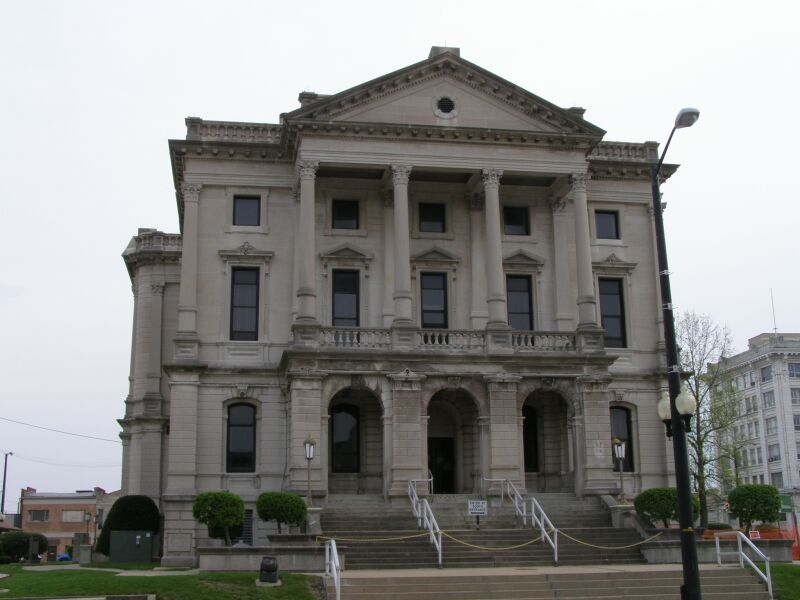
- Grant County Courthouse in Marion

- Seal Logo

- Location within the U.S. state of Indiana
- Coordinates: 40°31′N 85°39′W
- Country: United States
- State: Indiana
- Founded: 1831
- Named for: Samuel and Moses Grant
- Seat: Marion
- Largest city: Marion

Area
  - Total: 414.90 sq mi (1,074.6 km^{2})
  - Land: 414.07 sq mi (1,072.4 km^{2})
  - Water: 0.82 sq mi (2.1 km^{2}) 0.20%

Population (2020)
  - Total: 66,674
  - Estimate (2025): 66,524 ▼
  - Density: 161.02/sq mi (62.171/km^{2})
- Time zone: UTC−5 (Eastern)
  - Summer (DST): UTC−4 (EDT)
- Congressional district: 5th
- Website: www.in.gov/counties/grant/
- Indiana county number 27

Grant County is a county in central Indiana in the United States Midwest. At the time of the 2020 census, the population was 66,674. The county seat is Marion. Important paleontological discoveries, dating from the Pliocene epoch, have been made at the Pipe Creek Sinkhole in Grant County.

== History ==
Grant County was formed in 1831 by settlers from Kentucky and Virginia. It was named after Captains Samuel and Moses Grant of Kentucky, who were killed fighting indigenous warriors north of the Ohio River. Their home county was also named after them, Grant County, Kentucky.

In 1831, Martin Boots and David Branson each donated 30 acres of land to begin a settlement called Marion. This land was on the south side of a fast-flowing and scenic river which the Miami Indians called Mississinewa. Marion was designated as the County Seat. As the county was developed for agriculture, the County Seat became a center of trade and business, as well as government and the court system.

On August 7, 1930, a mob of an estimated 5,000 people took three African-American men, Thomas Shipp and Abram Smith, both 19, and James Cameron, 16, from the county jail. They were suspects in a robbery/murder and rape. The first two were hanged from trees in the courthouse square. Cameron was spared and later became a civil rights activist. This was the last lynching in Indiana.

In 1982, Stephen Johnson was elected as Grant County's first full-time prosecutor. He served for five terms, from 1983 through 2002.

== Geography ==
Grant County consists of low rolling hills, covered with vegetation and devoted to agriculture or urban development. The Mississinewa River flows northwesterly through the center of the county toward Mississinewa Lake in adjacent Miami County. The highest terrain consists of two rises in southeast Upland, at 950 ft (290 m) ASL. According to the 2010 census, the county has a total area of 414.90 square miles (1,074.6 km^{2}), of which 414.07 square miles (1,072.4 km^{2}) (or 99.80%) is land and 0.82 square miles (2.1 km^{2}) (or 0.20%) is water.

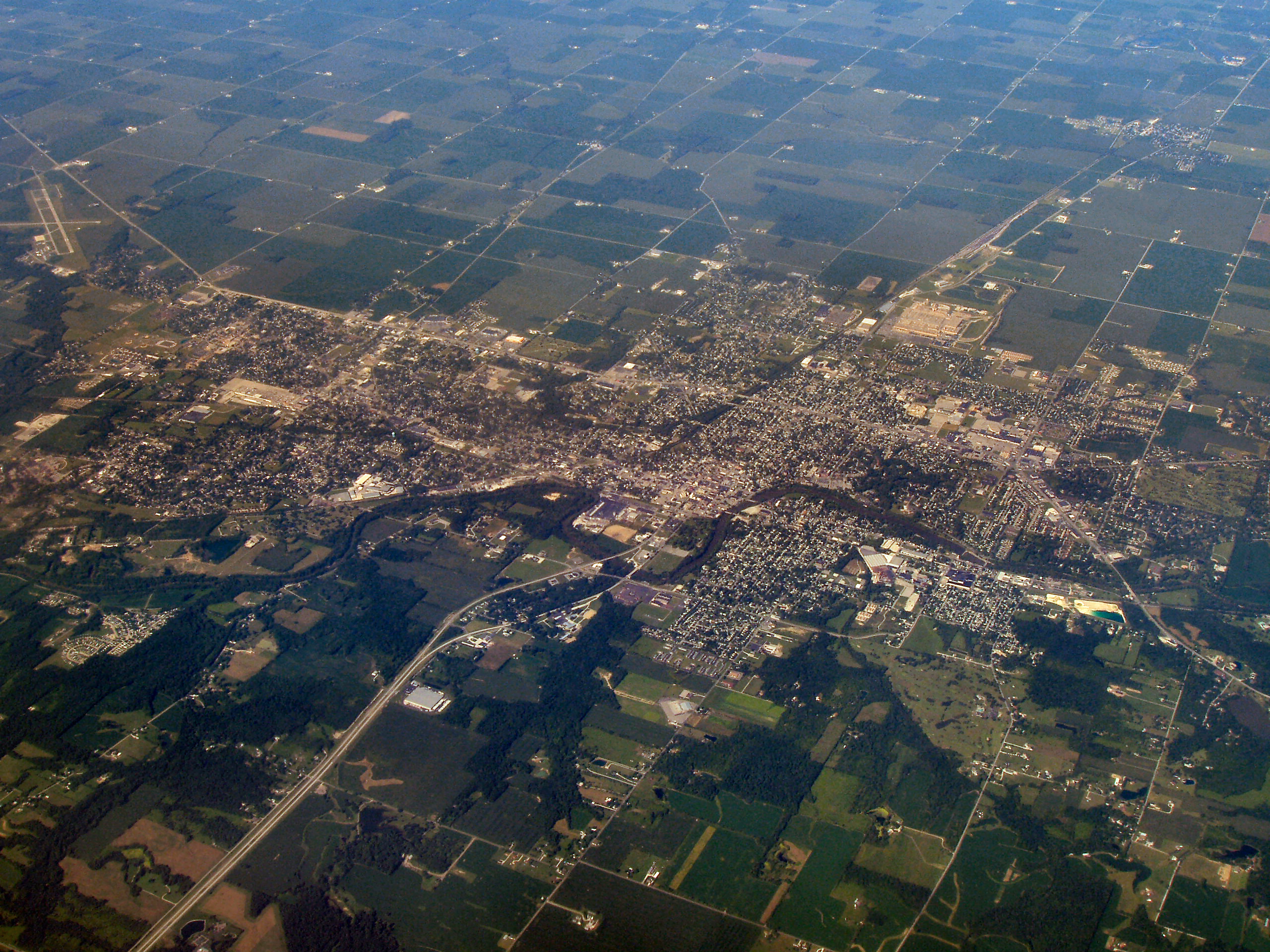
Aerial view of Marion

=== Adjacent counties ===
Grant County shares a border with nine neighboring counties, more than any other county in Indiana.

- Huntington County - northeast
- Wells County - northeast
- Blackford County - east
- Delaware County - southeast
- Madison County - south
- Tipton County - southwest
- Howard County - west
- Miami County - northwest
- Wabash County - northwest

=== Transit ===
- Marion Transit System

=== Major highways ===
- I-69 - Interstate Highway
- US 35 - Federal Highway
- SR 5 - State Highway
- SR 9 - State Highway
- SR 13 - State Highway
- SR 15 - State Highway
- SR 18 - State Highway
- SR 19 - State Highway
- SR 22 - State Highway
- SR 26 - State Highway
- SR 37 - State Highway

== Climate and weather ==
Marion, Indiana

Climate chart (precipitation, max. and min. temperature)
J	F	M	A	M	J	J	A	S	O	N	D
2.2 32 16	2 37 19	3 48 28	3.6 60 38	4.3 72 49	3.9 81 59	4.7 85 63	3.7 82 61	2.8 76 53	2.6 64 42	3.4 50 33	2.9 37 22
- █ Average max. and min. temperatures in °F
- █ Precipitation totals in inches
- Source: The Weather Channel
Metric conversion
J	F	M	A	M	J	J	A	S	O	N	D
55 0 −9	52 3 −7	76 9 −2	91 16 3	109 22 9	100 27 15	120 29 17	93 28 16	72 24 12	66 18 6	85 10 1	72 3 −6
- █ Average max. and min. temperatures in °C
- █ Precipitation totals in mm

In recent years, average temperatures in Marion have ranged from a low of 16 °F (−9 °C) in January to a high of 85 °F (29 °C) in July, although a record low of −23 °F (−31 °C) was recorded in January 1985 and a record high of 108 °F (42 °C) was recorded in July 1936. Average monthly precipitation ranged from 2.03 inches (52 mm) in February to 4.73 inches (120 mm) in July.

== Government ==
The county government is a constitutional body, granted specific powers by the Constitution of Indiana and the Indiana Code.

County Council: The legislative branch of the county government; controls spending and revenue collection in the county. Representatives, elected to four-year terms from county districts, are responsible for setting salaries, the annual budget, and special spending. The council also has limited authority to impose local taxes, in the form of an income and property tax that is subject to state level approval, excise taxes, and service taxes.

Board of Commissioners: The executive body of the county; commissioners are elected county-wide to staggered four-year terms. One commissioner serves as president. The commissioners are charged with executing the acts legislated by the council, collecting revenue, and managing the day-to-day functions of the county government.

Court: The county maintains a small claims court that can handle some civil cases. The judge on the court is elected to a term of four years and must be a member of the Indiana Bar Association. The judge is assisted by a constable who is also elected to a four-year term. In some cases, court decisions can be appealed to the state level circuit court.

County Officials: The county has several other elected offices, including sheriff, coroner, auditor, treasurer, recorder, surveyor and circuit court clerk, elected to four-year terms. Members elected to county government positions are required to declare party affiliations and to be residents of the county.

Grant County is part of Indiana's 5th congressional district; Indiana Senate districts 17, 19 and 21; and Indiana House of Representatives districts 31, 32 and 82.

United States presidential election results for Grant County, Indiana
Year	Republican		Democratic		Third party(ies)	
Year	No.	%	No.	%	No.	%
1888	3,929	53.87%	2,990	41.00%	374	5.13%
1892	4,916	52.21%	3,590	38.13%	909	9.65%
1896	7,723	58.95%	5,072	38.72%	305	2.33%
1900	8,832	57.79%	5,312	34.76%	1,140	7.46%
1904	9,550	58.27%	4,668	28.48%	2,170	13.24%
1908	7,181	49.42%	5,819	40.05%	1,531	10.54%
1912	3,939	30.22%	4,390	33.68%	4,707	36.11%
1916	6,059	43.38%	5,827	41.72%	2,081	14.90%
1920	12,349	55.12%	7,900	35.26%	2,156	9.62%
1924	11,173	55.10%	7,086	34.95%	2,017	9.95%
1928	14,659	65.98%	7,273	32.74%	284	1.28%
1932	11,398	43.90%	13,390	51.58%	1,173	4.52%
1936	11,774	44.84%	13,655	52.00%	831	3.16%
1940	15,187	52.77%	13,257	46.06%	335	1.16%
1944	14,527	55.07%	11,031	41.82%	821	3.11%
1948	13,138	50.31%	12,212	46.76%	765	2.93%
1952	16,678	59.73%	10,646	38.13%	599	2.15%
1956	17,548	64.50%	9,455	34.75%	203	0.75%
1960	19,021	57.92%	13,642	41.54%	178	0.54%
1964	14,688	45.20%	17,574	54.08%	232	0.71%
1968	16,170	52.46%	10,938	35.48%	3,718	12.06%
1972	20,969	72.41%	7,912	27.32%	77	0.27%
1976	16,847	55.14%	13,468	44.08%	239	0.78%
1980	19,078	61.72%	10,390	33.61%	1,441	4.66%
1984	20,482	66.78%	9,986	32.56%	205	0.67%
1988	18,441	62.79%	10,799	36.77%	131	0.45%
1992	13,806	48.04%	9,211	32.05%	5,721	19.91%
1996	13,443	50.77%	9,818	37.08%	3,217	12.15%
2000	16,153	61.22%	9,712	36.81%	521	1.97%
2004	18,769	68.35%	8,509	30.99%	182	0.66%
2008	14,734	55.93%	11,293	42.87%	317	1.20%
2012	15,151	59.82%	9,589	37.86%	589	2.33%
2016	17,008	66.51%	7,010	27.41%	1,554	6.08%
2020	18,543	68.10%	8,015	29.43%	672	2.47%
2024	17,580	69.69%	7,083	28.08%	563	2.23%

== Demographics ==
Historical population
Census	Pop.	Note	%±
1840	4,875		—
1850	11,092		127.5%
1860	15,797		42.4%
1870	18,487		17.0%
1880	23,618		27.8%
1890	31,493		33.3%
1900	54,693		73.7%
1910	51,426		−6.0%
1920	51,353		−0.1%
1930	51,066		−0.6%
1940	55,813		9.3%
1950	62,156		11.4%
1960	75,741		21.9%
1970	83,955		10.8%
1980	80,934		−3.6%
1990	74,169		−8.4%
2000	73,403		−1.0%
2010	70,061		−4.6%
2020	66,674		−4.8%
2025 (est.)	66,524	▼	−0.2%
US Decennial Census; 1790-1960 1900-1990; 1990-2000 2010-2013

=== Racial and ethnic composition ===
Grant County, Indiana – Racial and ethnic composition Note: the US Census treats Hispanic/Latino as an ethnic category. This table excludes Latinos from the racial categories and assigns them to a separate category. Hispanics/Latinos may be of any race.
Race / Ethnicity (NH = Non-Hispanic)	Pop 1980	Pop 1990	Pop 2000	Pop 2010	Pop 2020	% 1980	% 1990	% 2000	% 2010	% 2020
White alone (NH)	73,944	66,980	64,607	60,633	54,500	91.36%	90.31%	88.02%	86.54%	81.74%
Black or African American alone (NH)	5,203	5,002	5,229	4,805	4,566	6.43%	6.74%	7.12%	6.86%	6.85%
Native American or Alaska Native alone (NH)	158	285	298	218	157	0.20%	0.38%	0.41%	0.31%	0.24%
Asian alone (NH)	245	356	407	408	524	0.30%	0.48%	0.55%	0.58%	0.79%
Native Hawaiian or Pacific Islander alone (NH)	x	x	22	14	22	x	x	0.03%	0.02%	0.03%
Other race alone (NH)	113	32	127	88	240	0.14%	0.04%	0.17%	0.13%	0.36%
Mixed race or Multiracial (NH)	x	x	926	1,378	3,253	x	x	1.26%	1.97%	4.88%
Hispanic or Latino (any race)	1,271	1,514	1,787	2,517	3,412	1.57%	2.04%	2.43%	3.59%	5.12%
Total	80,934	74,169	73,403	70,061	66,674	100.00%	100.00%	100.00%	100.00%	100.00%

=== 2020 census ===
As of the 2020 census, the county had a population of 66,674. The median age was 40.8 years. 20.7% of residents were under the age of 18 and 19.9% of residents were 65 years of age or older. For every 100 females there were 93.4 males, and for every 100 females age 18 and over there were 90.4 males age 18 and over.

The racial makeup of the county was 83.4% White, 7.0% Black or African American, 0.3% American Indian and Alaska Native, 0.8% Asian, <0.1% Native Hawaiian and Pacific Islander, 1.7% from some other race, and 6.7% from two or more races. Hispanic or Latino residents of any race comprised 5.1% of the population.

61.4% of residents lived in urban areas, while 38.6% lived in rural areas.

There were 26,487 households in the county, of which 26.9% had children under the age of 18 living in them. Of all households, 43.4% were married-couple households, 19.6% were households with a male householder and no spouse or partner present, and 29.7% were households with a female householder and no spouse or partner present. About 31.8% of all households were made up of individuals and 14.4% had someone living alone who was 65 years of age or older.

There were 29,810 housing units, of which 11.1% were vacant. Among occupied housing units, 68.8% were owner-occupied and 31.2% were renter-occupied. The homeowner vacancy rate was 2.4% and the rental vacancy rate was 11.0%.

=== 2010 census ===
As of the 2010 census, there were 70,061 people, 27,245 households, and 18,000 families in the county. The population density was 169.2 inhabitants per square mile (65.3/km^{2}). There were 30,443 housing units at an average density of 73.5 per square mile (28.4/km^{2}). The racial makeup of the county was 88.2% white, 7.0% black or African American, 0.6% Asian, 0.3% American Indian, 1.4% from other races, and 2.4% from two or more races. Those of Hispanic or Latino origin made up 3.6% of the population. In terms of ancestry, 19.5% were German, 12.4% were American, 10.0% were Irish, and 9.0% were English.

Of the 27,245 households, 29.4% had children under the age of 18 living with them, 48.0% were married couples living together, 13.4% had a female householder with no husband present, 33.9% were non-families, and 28.8% of all households were made up of individuals. The average household size was 2.39 and the average family size was 2.89. The median age was 39.5 years.

The median income for a household in the county was $47,697 and the median income for a family was $49,860. Males had a median income of $40,146 versus $28,588 for females. The per capita income for the county was $19,792. About 12.0% of families and 17.0% of the population were below the poverty line, including 25.0% of those under age 18 and 9.4% of those age 65 or over.

== Localities ==
=== Cities ===
- Gas City
- Jonesboro
- Marion

=== Towns ===
- Fairmount
- Fowlerton
- Matthews
- Swayzee
- Sweetser
- Upland
- Van Buren

=== Census-designated places ===
- Herbst
- Jalapa
- Landess
- Mier
- Point Isabel
- Sims

=== Unincorporated communities ===
- Farrville
- Friendly Corner
- Hackleman
- Hanfield
- Michaelsville
- Normal
- Radley
- Rigdon
- Roseburg
- Weaver

=== Townships ===
- Center
- Fairmount
- Franklin
- Green
- Jefferson
- Liberty
- Mill
- Monroe
- Pleasant
- Richland
- Sims
- Van Buren
- Washington

== Education ==
School districts include:

- Eastbrook Community School Corporation
- Madison-Grant United School Corporation
- Marion Community Schools
- Mississinewa Community School Corporation
- Oak Hill United School Corporation

== See also ==
- National Register of Historic Places listings in Grant County, Indiana
