= Mississinewa River =

Tributary of the Wabash River in eastern Indiana and western Ohio, United States

Coordinates: 40°17′40.5″N 84°43′52″W

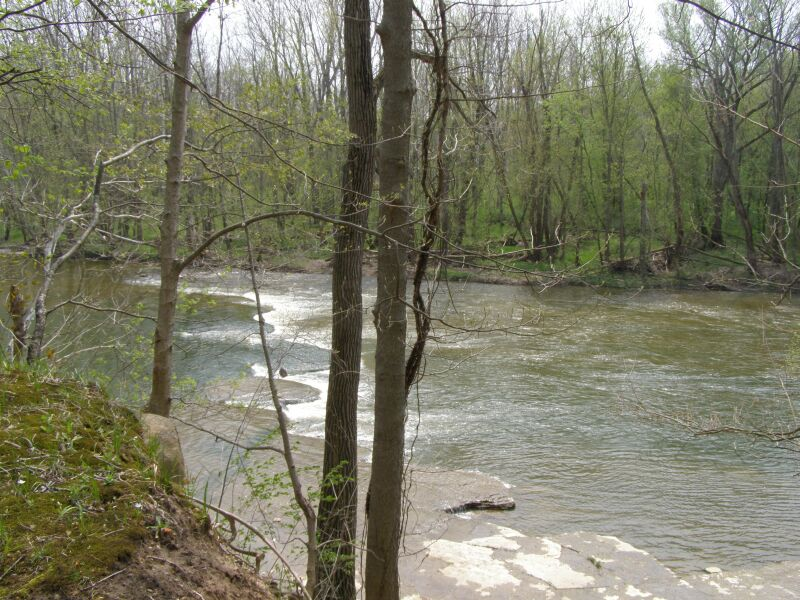
- The Mississinewa River near Marion, Indiana

Location
- Country: United States

Physical characteristics
- Source
  - location: Darke County, Ohio
- Mouth
  - location: Wabash River near Peru, Indiana
- Length: 120 mi (190 km)

The Mississinewa River is a tributary of the Wabash River in eastern Indiana and a small portion of western Ohio in the United States. It is 120 miles (190 km) long and is the third largest tributary behind the White and Little Wabash Rivers, only slightly larger than the Embarras and Vermilion Rivers. Via the Wabash and Ohio rivers, it is part of the Mississippi River watershed.

During the War of 1812, the river was the site of the Battle of the Mississinewa, which pitted United States forces against the Miami Indians. Two oilers of the U.S. Navy have been named USS Mississinewa after the river. The word Mississinewa is partly derived from the Miami Indian word nimacihsinwi which means “It lies on a slope”.

== Course ==
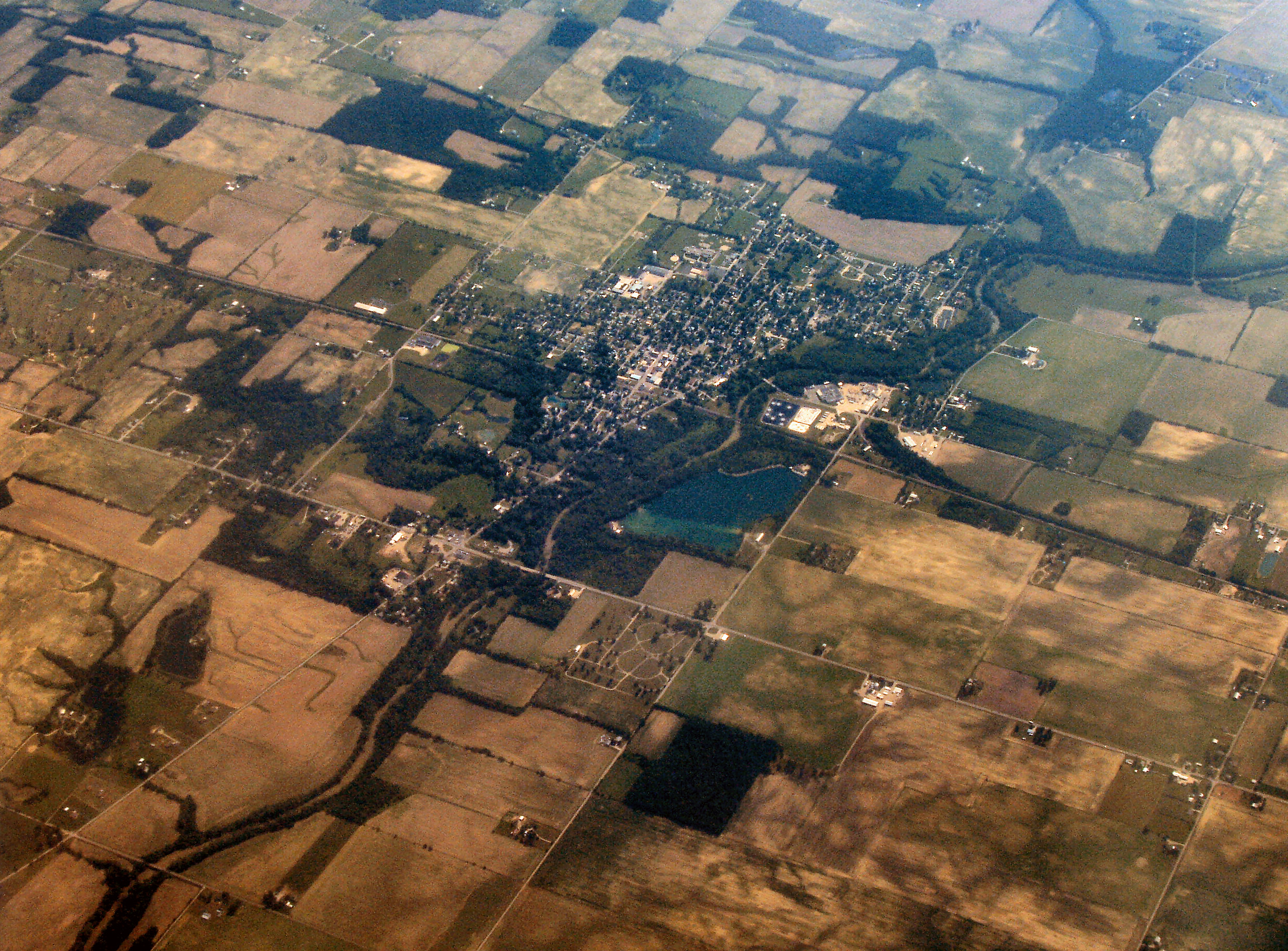
The Mississinewa River flowing through Eaton, Indiana

The Mississinewa River has its headwaters near the Indiana state border in northwestern Darke County, Ohio, within 2 miles (3.2 km) of the start of the Wabash. Both rivers start out as drainage ditches for local farms and have very little water during drought in this immediate area. After exiting Darke County the Mississinewa flows for the remainder of its course in Indiana. It initially flows westward in a heavily straightened and channelized course through northern Randolph and Delaware counties; it turns northwestward in Delaware County and flows through Grant, Wabash and Miami counties. It joins the Wabash River from the south in Miami County, about 2 miles (3 km) east of Peru.

Along its course the Mississinewa flows past the towns of Ridgeville, Albany, Eaton, Matthews and the cities of Jonesboro, Gas City and Marion.

A series of limestone columns known as the "Seven Pillars of the Mississinewa" stands on the north side of the river about three miles (5 km) southeast of Peru in Miami County.

The Indiana Central Canal was to use the river for part of its length, but was never completed.

== Dams ==
Near its mouth in Miami County, the U.S. Army Corps of Engineers Mississinewa Lake Dam causes the river to form Mississinewa Lake. The dam was built for flood control in 1967.

Two related and nearby lakes in north-central Indiana, created at approximately the same time as part of the same project, were formed when dams were constructed on the nearby Salamonie River and Wabash River. The Salamonie and Mississinewa join the Wabash downriver from the dam on the Wabash. The dams were designed to reduce flooding in southern Indiana and nearby towns.

== History ==
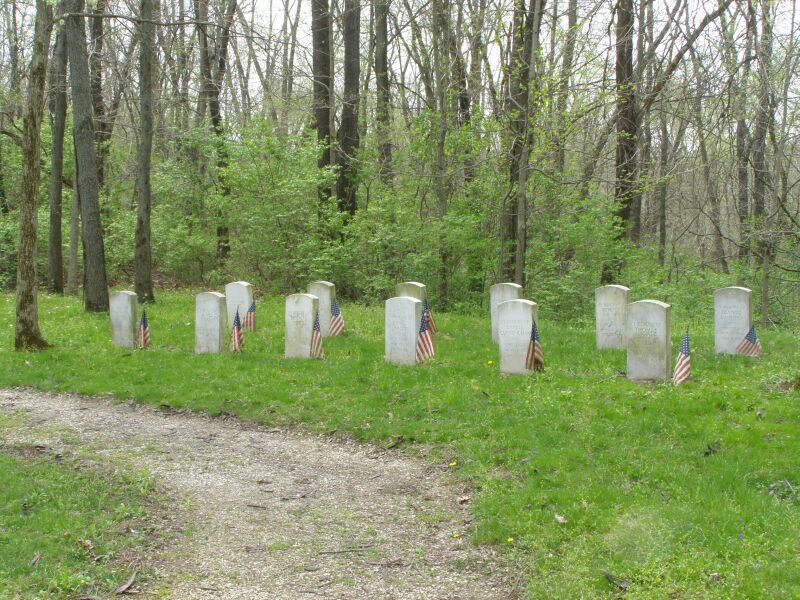
Mississinewa Battle Memorial

=== Mississinewa Battlefield ===
On Dec. 17, 1812, Lt. Colonel John B. Campbell with 600 mounted troops arrived at this site under orders to destroy the Miami Indian Villages along the Mississinewa River from here to the present site of Peru. The destruction of the village on this site resulted in the loss of the lives of two soldiers and eight Indians. Following the attack here, Campbell's force proceeded two miles down the river and destroyed two more villages before returning here to camp for the night. Shortly before dawn on December 18, a force of Miami Indians attacked Campbell's camp. The two-hour battle resulted in 10 soldiers being killed and 48 wounded. Approximately 40 Miami and Delaware Indians were killed. Having over 100 of his horses killed and fearing a second attack, Campbell ordered his troops to return to Fort Greenville late in the afternoon of the 18th. This action was one of the first ordered by General William Henry Harrison during the War of 1812.

== In literature ==
The Mississinewa River is mentioned frequently in a series of poems by the contemporary American poet Jared Carter. In 1959 and 1960, while working as a reporter for the Huntington Herald-Press in Huntington, Indiana, Carter covered initial governmental announcements of the proposed construction of three large reservoir dams in north-central Indiana on the Mississinewa, Salamonie, and Wabash rivers.

In his first book, Work, for the Night Is Coming, published by Macmillan in 1981, Carter created the mythical Midwestern county of Mississinewa. The dustjacket explains that this county is located "east of Spoon River, west of Winesburg, and slightly north of Raintree County." Its county seat is the actual rural town of Somerset next to the Mississinewa (River) Reservoir. The existing town of Somerset was moved by the U.S. Army Corps of Engineers up and out of the valley prior to the valley being flooded in 1966 to create the reservoir. The town now sits on the ridge above the river valley and reservoir in Wabash and Grant counties. To the northwest, in imaginary Prophet Township, the equally imaginary Massasauga River flows into the Mississinewa.

In that first book, two early poems, "The Undertaker" and "Monument City", refer to the construction of a large reservoir on the Mississinewa River. This imaginary and purely literary reservoir is a conflation of the three actual lakes created by dams on the Mississinewa and the two adjacent rivers.

In Carter's later books, After the Rain and Cross this Bridge at a Walk, additional poems – "The Purpose of Poetry", "Mississinewa Reservoir at Winter Pool", "Foundling", "Isinglass", "Mussel Shell with Three Blanks Sawed Out", and "Lost Bridge" – narrate changes and dislocations in the lives of local residents brought about by the coming of the reservoir.

The Mississinewa is also referenced in the title and lyrics of the song "By the Mississinewa" from the 1943 Cole Porter musical "Something for the Boys". Porter was born and raised in Peru, Indiana, near the mouth of the Mississinewa.

== See also ==
- List of rivers of Indiana
- List of rivers of Ohio
