= Old soldiers' home =

Military veterans' retirement home, nursing home, or hospital

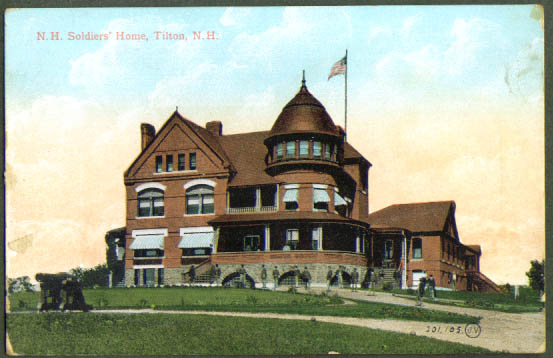
Many of the old soldiers' homes in the United States were constructed in high Victorian style, like the New Hampshire Soldiers' Home in Tilton, New Hampshire.

An old soldiers' home is a military veterans' retirement home, nursing home, or hospital, or sometimes an institution for the care of the widows and orphans of a nation's soldiers, sailors, and marines, etc.

== Australia ==
Sydney Sailors' Home

Coutt's Sailors Home

== United Kingdom ==
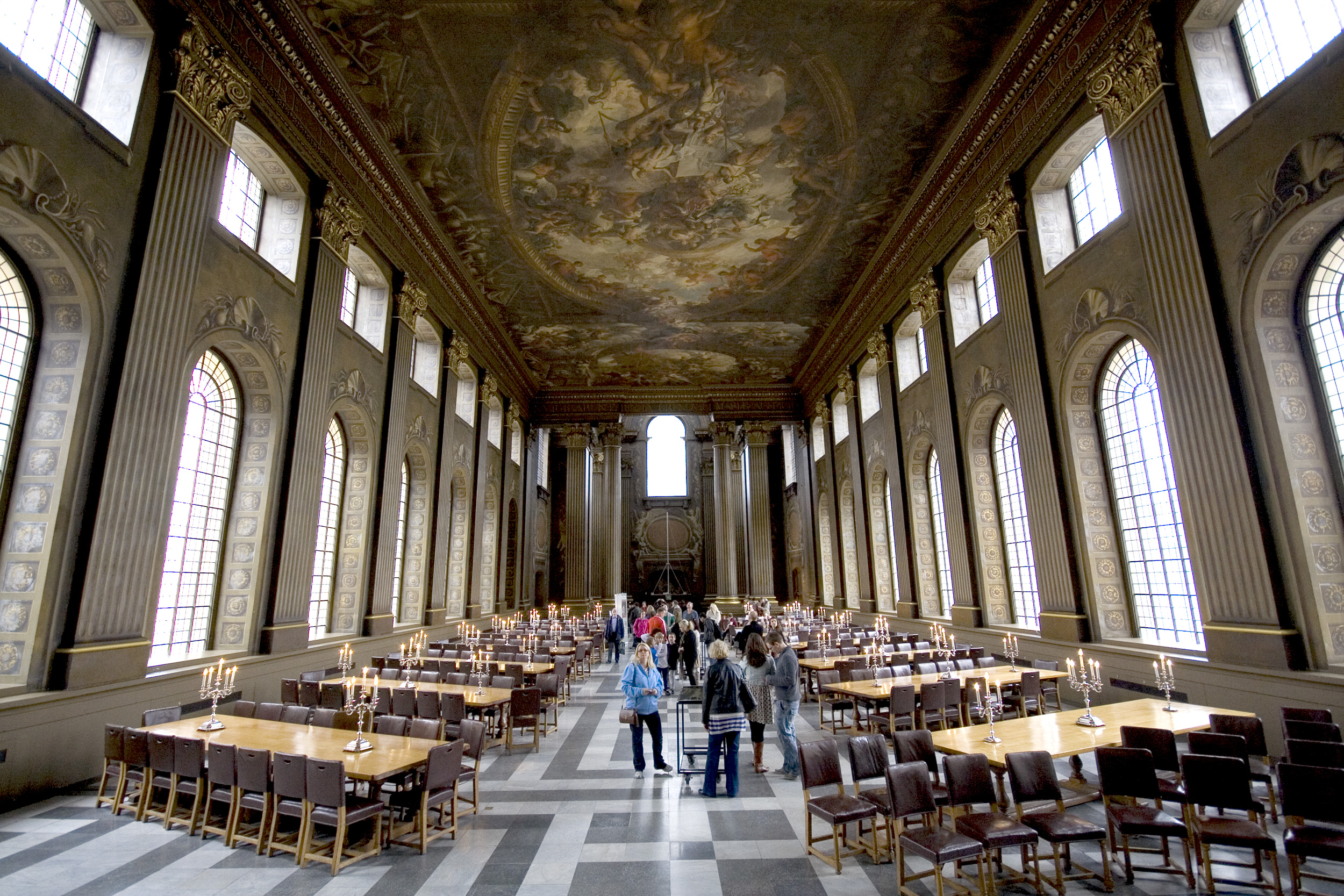
The Painted Hall, Old Royal Naval College

In the United Kingdom the Royal Hospital Chelsea was established by King Charles II in 1682 as a retreat for veterans. The provision of a hostel rather than the payment of pensions was inspired by Les Invalides in Paris.

The Royal Hospital Chelsea, often called simply Chelsea Hospital, is a retirement home and nursing home for some 300 veterans of the British Army. It is a 66-acre site located on Royal Hospital Road in Chelsea, London. It is an independent charity and relies partly upon donations to cover day-to-day running costs to provide care and accommodation for veterans.

Any man or woman who is over the age of 65 and served as a regular soldier may apply to become a Chelsea Pensioner (i.e. a resident), on the basis they have found themselves in a time of need and are "of good character". They must not, however, have any dependent spouse or family and former Officers must have served at least 12 years in the ranks before receiving a commission.

The site for the Royal Hospital was an area of Chelsea which held an incomplete building "Chelsey College", a theological college James I founded in 1609. The Royal Hospital opened its doors to the Chelsea Pensioners in 1692 for "the relief and succour" of veterans. Some of the first soldiers admitted included those injured at the Battle of Sedgemoor.

The hospital maintains a 'military-based culture which puts a premium on comradeship'. The in-pensioners are formed into three companies, each headed by a Captain of Invalids (an ex-Army officer responsible for the 'day to day welfare, management and administration' of the pensioners under his charge).

There is also a Secretary who traditionally was responsible for paying the Army pensions, but today they look after the annual budget, staff, buildings and grounds. Further senior staff include the Physician & Surgeon, the Matron, the Quartermaster, the Chaplain and the Adjutant.

A Board of Commissioners has governed the Royal Hospital since 1702. The ex-officio chairman of the board is HM Paymaster General (whose predecessor Sir Stephen Fox was instrumental in founding the Hospital in the seventeenth century). The purpose of the Board is 'to guide the development of The Royal Hospital, ensuring the care and well-being of the Chelsea Pensioners who live there and safeguarding the historic buildings and grounds, which it owns in trust'.

Royal Hospital is also a ward of the Kensington and Chelsea Council. The population at the 2011 Census was 7,252.

Greenwich Hospital was a permanent home for retired sailors of the Royal Navy, which operated from 1692 to 1869. Its buildings were later used by the Royal Naval College, Greenwich and the University of Greenwich, and are now known as the Old Royal Naval College. The word "hospital" was used in its original sense of a place providing hospitality for those in need of it, and did not refer to medical care, although the buildings included an infirmary which, after Greenwich Hospital closed, operated as Dreadnought Seaman's Hospital until 1986. The foundation which operated the hospital still exists, for the benefit of former Royal Navy personnel and their dependents. It now provides sheltered housing on other sites.

The hospital was created as the Royal Hospital for Seamen at Greenwich on the instructions of Queen Mary II, who had been inspired by the sight of wounded sailors returning from the Battle of La Hogue in 1692. She ordered the King Charles wing of the palace—originally designed by architect John Webb for King Charles II in 1664—to be remodelled as a naval hospital to provide a counterpart for the Chelsea Hospital for soldiers. Sir Christopher Wren and his assistant Nicholas Hawksmoor gave their services free of charge as architects of the new Royal Hospital. Sir John Vanbrugh succeeded Wren as architect, completing the complex to Wren's original plans.

Construction was financed through an endowment, financed through the transfer of £19,500 in fines paid by merchants convicted of smuggling in 1695, a public fundraising appeal which brought in £9,000, and a £2,000 annual contribution from Treasury. In 1705 an additional £6,472 was paid into the fund, comprising the liquidated value of estates belonging to the recently hanged pirate Captain William Kidd.

The first of the principal buildings constructed was the King Charles Court (the oldest part dating back to the restoration), completed in 1705. The first governor, Sir William Gifford, took up office in 1708.

== United States ==
=== Federal homes ===
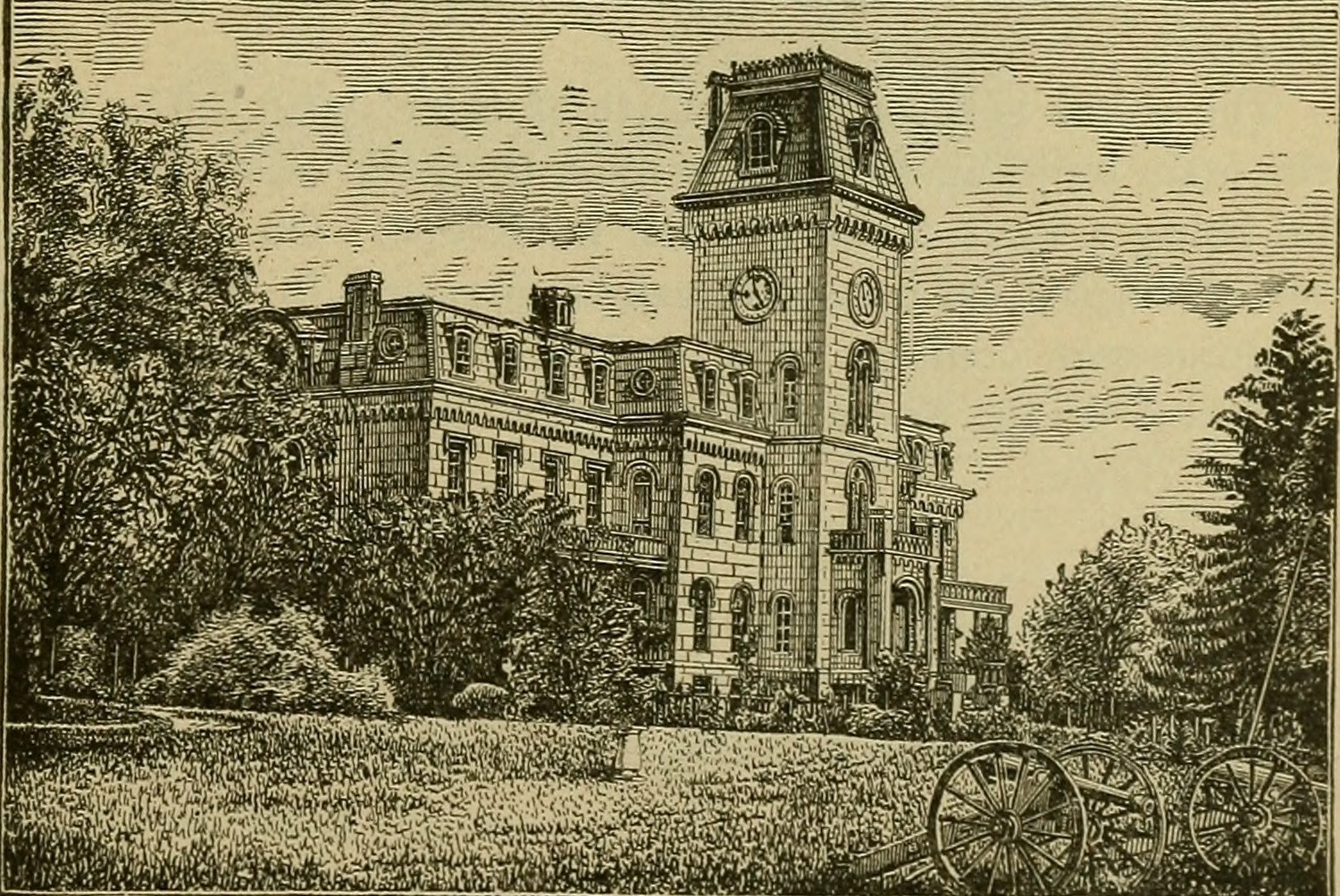
1880's "Soldiers' Home" in Washington D.C. (Roose's companion and guide to Washington and vicinity (1887))

The first national veterans' home in the United States was the United States Naval Home approved in 1811 but not opened until 1834 in the Philadelphia Naval Yard. The Naval Home was moved to Gulfport, Mississippi in 1976. It was subsequently opened to veterans of other services and is now the Gulfport Campus of the Armed Forces Retirement Home.

The first Army national old soldiers' home in the U.S. was established in Washington, D.C., in 1851. General Winfield Scott founded the Soldier's Home in Washington, D.C., and another (since fallen into disuse) in Harrodsburg, Kentucky with about $118,000 in leftover proceeds of assessments on occupied Mexican towns and the sale of captured tobacco in the Mexican–American War.

The Old Soldier's Home, now known as the Armed Forces Retirement Home, was the site of President Lincoln's Cottage, a 34-room Gothic Revival cottage, which served as Lincoln's summer home during the American Civil War. It is adjacent to National Cemetery, the first federal military cemetery in the United States. The Home has remained in continuous use since its establishment. It is located on a 250-acre (1.0 km^{2}) wooded campus overlooking the U.S. Capitol in the heart of Washington, D.C., three miles from the White House, and continues to serve as a retirement home for U.S. enlisted men and women. Both the Washington, D.C., and Gulfport soldiers' and sailors' homes are funded through a small monthly contribution from the pay of members of the U.S. Armed Services.

Following the American Civil War the federal government increased the number of National Military Homes, and took over a few formerly state-run old soldiers' homes. By 1933 there were 17 federally managed veterans homes. All except the first two of these homes were eventually combined with other federal government agencies to become part of what is now called the Veterans Administration, or U.S. Department of Veterans Affairs established in 1930.

=== State homes ===
Caring for the disabled and elderly, and the widows and orphans of men who died in the war became a concern even before the Civil War ended. For example, in 1864 Fitch's Home for Soldiers and Their Orphans was opened with private donations in Connecticut. Various female benevolent societies pushed for the creation of a long-term care federal or state soldier home system at the end of the war. Large veterans organizations like the Grand Army of the Republic and United Confederate Veterans eventually also worked for the creation of federal and state homes to care for disabled or elderly veterans. In a few cases veterans organizations on their own raised the money to buy property and build veterans homes. Most of these were quickly turned over to the state government to fund and manage. The majority of state legislatures established veterans homes paid for by state monies from the start. 43 states managed 55 functioning state veterans homes before 1933. Fourteen of those states also had a federal veterans home open at the same time as their state veterans home.

Eleven states had two or more state veterans homes in operation at the same time (two of which also had a federal home). Some states simply had several homes at once. A few states admitted veterans' widows, and a few other states established separate homes for the widows and orphans. A few states had separate Union and Confederate old soldiers' homes. The first of 16 Confederate homes was opened in 1881 in Georgetown, Kentucky. Confederate soldiers' homes were supported entirely by subscribers or by the states, with no funds from the federal government against which the Confederates had fought.

A few state-run old soldiers' homes were eventually folded into the federal veterans home system. As their last few Civil War veterans were dying in the 1930s, some states chose to close their old soldiers' homes, and other states began admission of veterans from more recent wars. Several of these state old soldiers' homes have been modernized and stopped serving veterans.

=== City homes ===
Soldier homes in major cities were among the earliest, usually starting more as hotels for men passing through town, but increasingly taking on disabled servicemen. These were usually operated as paying businesses rather than being fully funded by the government. Philadelphia had two soldiers' homes which were associated with nearby saloons and got their start as a part of the refreshment and lodging business. Women activists also helped establish disabled soldiers' homes in Boston, Chicago, and Milwaukee, or in conjunction with the U.S. Sanitary Commission in 25 other cities. The Boston home closed in 1869, the Philadelphia homes closed in 1872, the Chicago Soldiers' Home lasted until 1877, and Milwaukee turned into a federal home.

=== US Sanitary Commission homes, lodges, and rest ===
During the Civil War, the US Sanitary Commission provided Union servicemen "[t]emporary aid and protection,—food, lodging, care, etc.,—for soldiers in transitn[sic], chiefly the discharged, disabled, and furloughed." By 1865 the Commission operated 18 "soldiers' homes," 11 "lodges," and one "rest" in 15 states north and south (for a list see Commission bulletin, 3:1279). Most of their homes were war-time facilities and were closed at war's end. They are not included in the following list.

=== List of historic old soldiers' and sailors' homes in the United States ===
(By state)

- Alabama Confederate Soldiers Home a.k.a. Jefferson Manly Falkner Soldiers' Home, Mountain Creek, Alabama
- Tuskegee Home a.k.a. Veterans Administration Hospital and Nursing Home, Tuskegee, Alabama
- Arkansas Confederate Soldiers' Home, Sweet Home, Arkansas
- Los Angeles Disabled Veterans Home a.k.a. Pacific Branch National Military Home, Sawtelle, Los Angeles, California
- Veterans Home of California Yountville, Yountville, California
- Colorado State Soldiers and Sailors Home, Homelake, Colorado
- Fitch's Home for Soldiers and Their Orphans, Darien, Connecticut
- United States Soldiers' Home a.k.a. Armed Forces Retirement Home, Washington, D.C.
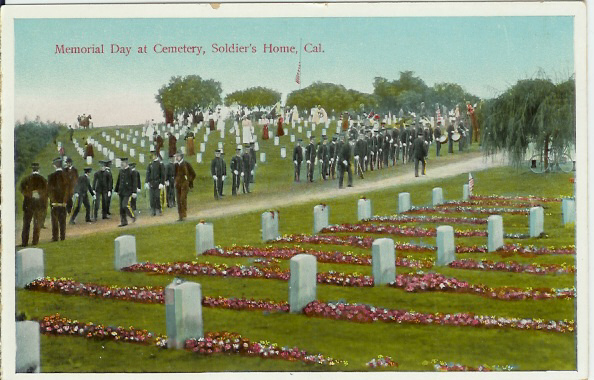
  Many old soldiers lived out their old age and died under the institutional care of the home, as at the Soldiers' Home in Sawtelle, Los Angeles, California.
- Florida Old Confederate Soldiers and Sailors Home, Jacksonville, Florida
- St. Petersburg [National] Home (Bay Pines), St. Petersburg, Florida
- Confederate Soldiers' Home a.k.a. Georgia Soldiers' Home, Atlanta, Georgia
- Idaho State Soldiers Home, Boise, Idaho
- Soldiers' Home, Chicago, Illinois
- Danville Branch National Military Home, Danville, Illinois
- Logan Home a.k.a. Maywood Home for Soldiers' Widows, Maywood, Illinois
- Illinois Soldiers and Sailors Home a.k.a. Illinois Veterans Home, Quincy, Illinois
- Soldiers' Widows' Home, Wilmington, Illinois
- Marion Branch National Military Home, Marion, Indiana
- Indiana State Soldiers Home, West Lafayette, Indiana
- Iowa Veterans Home, Marshalltown, Iowa
- Kansas Soldiers' Home, Fort Dodge, Kansas
- Kansas State Soldiers' Home a.k.a. Western Branch National Military Home, Leavenworth, Kansas
- Confederate Soldiers' Home and Widows' and Orphans' Asylum, Georgetown, Kentucky
- Kentucky Confederate Soldiers' Home, Pewee Valley, Kentucky
- Soldiers' Home at Harrodsburg, Kentucky
- Soldiers' Home of Louisiana a.k.a. Camp Nicholls Soldier's Home, New Orleans, Louisiana
- Eastern Branch National Military Home, Togus, Maine
- Maryland Line Confederate Soldiers' Home, Pikesville, Maryland
- Discharged Soldiers' Home, Boston, Massachusetts
- Soldiers' Home, Chelsea, Massachusetts
- Soldiers' Home, Holyoke, Massachusetts
- Grand Rapids Home for Veterans, Grand Rapids, Michigan
- National Sailors' Home, Wollaston, Quincy, Massachusetts
- Minnesota Veterans Home, Minneapolis, Minnesota
- Beauvoir Confederate Soldiers' Home a.k.a. Jefferson Davis Beauvoir Memorial Soldiers' Home, Biloxi, Mississippi
- Biloxi Home [National Home] a.k.a. VA Medical Center, Biloxi, Mississippi
- Missouri Confederate Home, Higginsville, Missouri
- Missouri State Federal Soldiers' Home, St. James, Missouri
- Montana State Soldiers' Home, Columbia Falls, Montana
- Soldiers and Sailors' Home, Grand Island, Nebraska
- Soldiers and Sailors' Home, Milford, Nebraska
- New Hampshire Soldiers' Home, Tilton, New Hampshire
- Home for Disabled Soldiers, Kearny, New Jersey
- Veterans Memorial Home, Menlo Park, New Jersey
- Home for Disabled Soldiers, Newark, New Jersey
- Veterans Memorial Home, Vineland, New Jersey
- New York State Soldiers' and Sailors' Home a.k.a. Bath Branch National Military Home, Bath, New York
- American Seamen's Friend Society Sailors' Home and Institute West Village neighborhood of Manhattan in New York City.
- State Women's Relief Corps Home a.k.a. New York State Veterans Home, Oxford, New York
- Confederate Women's Home, Fayetteville, North Carolina
- North Carolina Soldiers' Home, Raleigh, North Carolina
- Soldiers Home, Lisbon, North Dakota

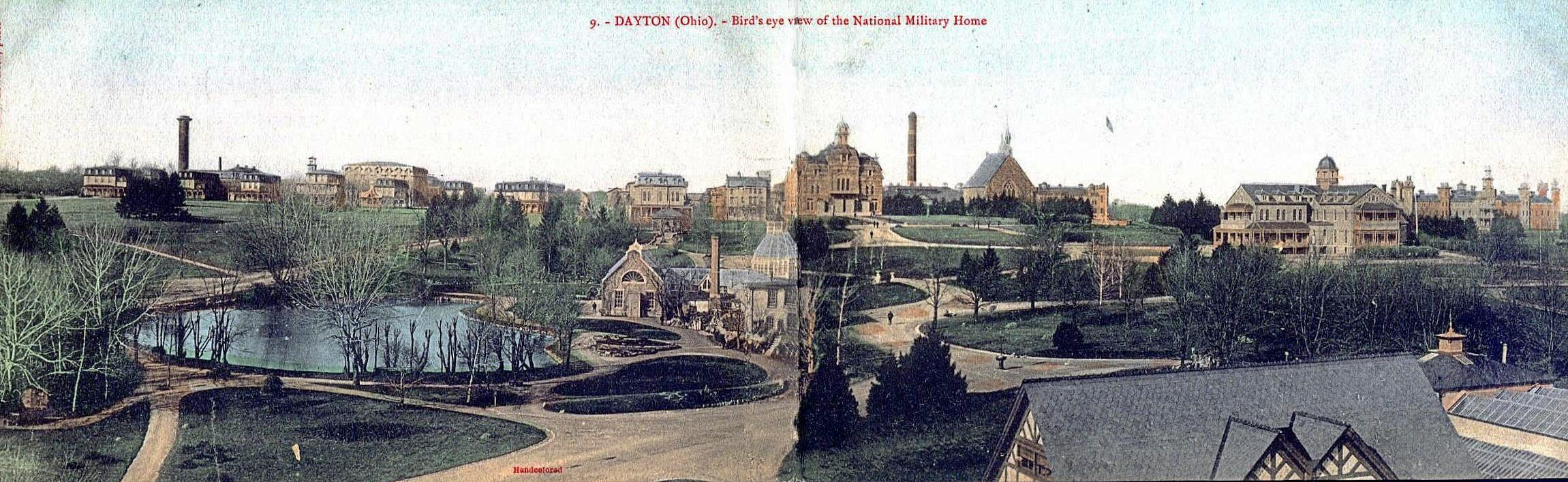
Soldiers home in Dayton, Ohio

- Central Branch National Soldiers' Home, Dayton, Ohio
- Soldiers' Home, Sandusky, Ohio
- Oklahoma Confederate Home a.k.a. Oklahoma Veterans Center, Ardmore, Oklahoma
- Oklahoma Union Soldiers' Home, Oklahoma City, Oklahoma
- Oregon State Soldiers' Home a.k.a. Roseburg Branch National Military Home, Roseburg, Oregon
- Soldiers' and Sailors' Home, Erie, Pennsylvania
- Cooper Shop Soldiers' Home, Philadelphia, Pennsylvania
- Soldiers' Home of Philadelphia, Philadelphia, Pennsylvania
- United States Naval Home, Philadelphia, Pennsylvania
- Rhode Island Soldiers' Home, Bristol, Rhode Island
- Confederate Home for Soldiers and Sailors a.k.a. South Carolina Confederate Infirmary, Columbia, South Carolina
- Battle Mountain Sanitarium National Military Home, Hot Springs, South Dakota
- South Dakota State Soldiers' Home a.k.a. Michael J. Fitzmaurice Veterans Home, Hot Springs, South Dakota
- Mountain Branch National Military Home, Johnson City, Tennessee
- Confederate Soldiers' Home a.k.a. Tennessee Soldiers' Home, Hermitage (Nashville), Tennessee
- Texas Confederate Home for Men, Austin, Texas
- Texas Confederate Woman's Home, north of Austin, Texas
- Vermont Soldiers' Home, Bennington, Vermont

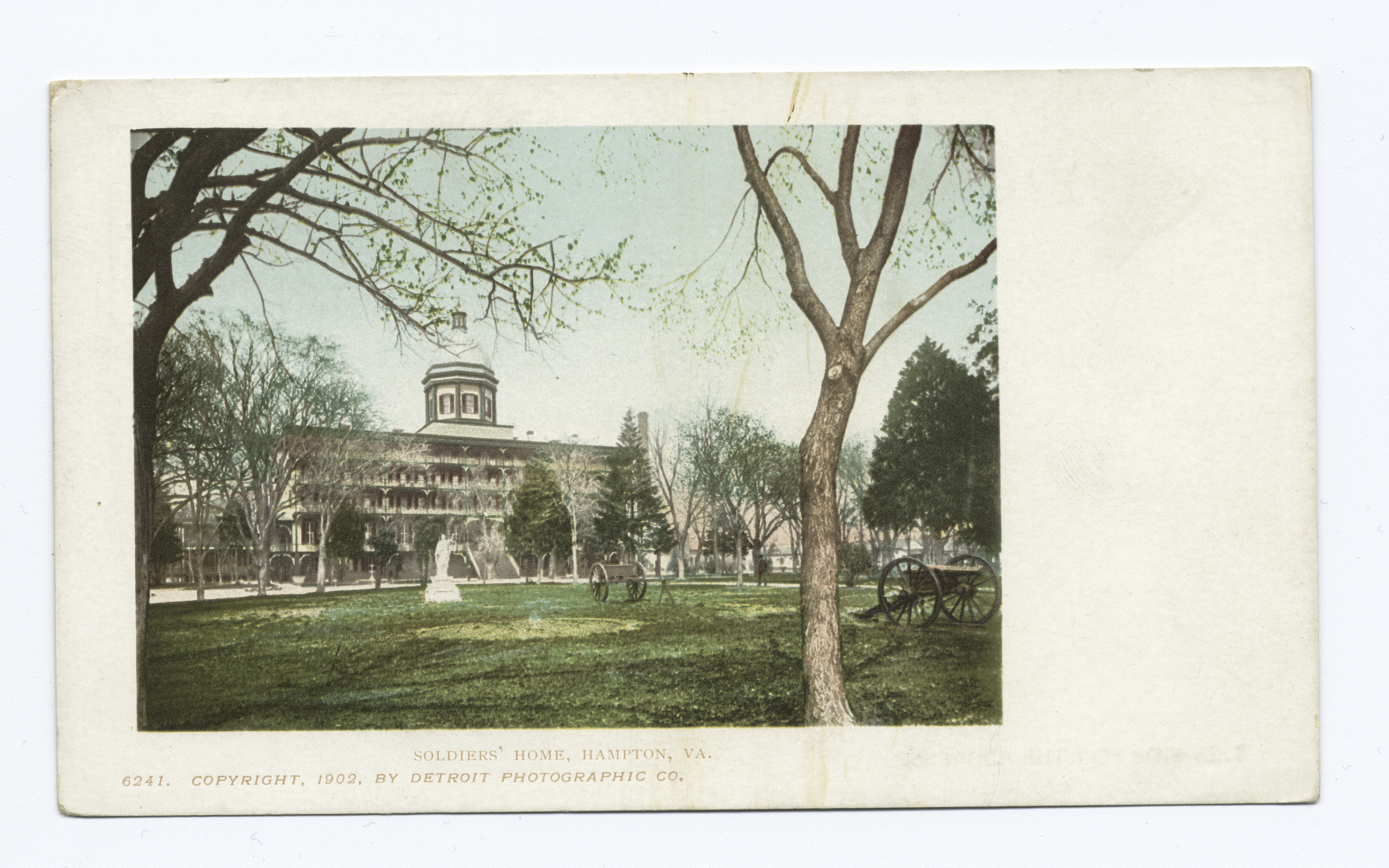
Soldier's Home, Hampton, Va

- Southern Branch National Military Home, Hampton, Virginia
- Virginia Confederate Soldiers' Home a.k.a. Lee Camp Soldiers' Home, Richmond, Virginia
- Washington State Soldiers' Home, and Washington State Soldiers' Colony, Orting, Washington
- Washington Veterans' Home, Retsil, Washington
- Grand Army Home, a.k.a. Wisconsin Veterans' Home, King, Waupaca County, Wisconsin
- Milwaukee Soldiers Home, in the 90 acres (36 ha) Milwaukee Soldiers Home National Historic Landmark District—Northwestern Branch, National Home for Disabled Volunteer Soldiers Historic District, on the 400 acres (160 ha) Clement J. Zablocki VA Medical Center grounds in Milwaukee, Wisconsin. The most intact Soldiers Home in the country and the only one with the majority of its surrounding recuperative village remaining.
- Wyoming State Home for Soldiers and Sailors, Cheyenne, Wyoming (1895–1903), It was relocated to Buffalo, Wyoming in 1903, where it continues to serve in the present day.
- Wyoming Soldiers and Sailors Home (1903- )

== See also ==
- Retirement home
- Nursing home
