= Nicholas Irwin =

- Born: c. 1833; Denmark
- Died: April 19, 1896 (aged 62–63)
- Burial place: Marion National Cemetery, Marion, Indiana
- Military career
- Allegiance: United States
- Branch: United States Navy
- Rank: Seaman
- Unit: USS Brooklyn
- Conflicts: American Civil War • Battle of Mobile Bay
- Awards: Medal of Honor

Nicholas Irwin (c. 1833 – April 19, 1896) was a Union Navy sailor in the American Civil War and a recipient of the U.S. military's highest decoration, the Medal of Honor, for his actions at the Battle of Mobile Bay.

Born in about 1833 in Denmark, Irwin immigrated to the United States and was living in New York when he joined the U.S. Navy. He served during the Civil War as a seaman on the USS Brooklyn. At the Battle of Mobile Bay on August 5, 1864, he "fought his gun with skill and courage" despite heavy fire. For this action, he was awarded the Medal of Honor four months later, on December 31, 1864.

Irwin's official Medal of Honor citation reads:

On board the U.S.S. Brooklyn during action against rebel forts and gunboats and with the ram Tennessee, in Mobile Bay, 5 August 1864. Despite severe damage to his ship and the loss of several men on board as enemy fire raked her decks from stem to stern, Irwin fought his gun with skill and courage throughout the furious battle which resulted in the surrender of the prize rebel ram Tennessee and in the damaging and destruction of batteries at Fort Morgan.

Irwin died on April 19, 1896, at age 62 or 63 and was buried at Marion National Cemetery in Marion, Indiana.
