= Aaron Swayzee House =

Historic house in Indiana, United States

- U.S. National Register of Historic Places
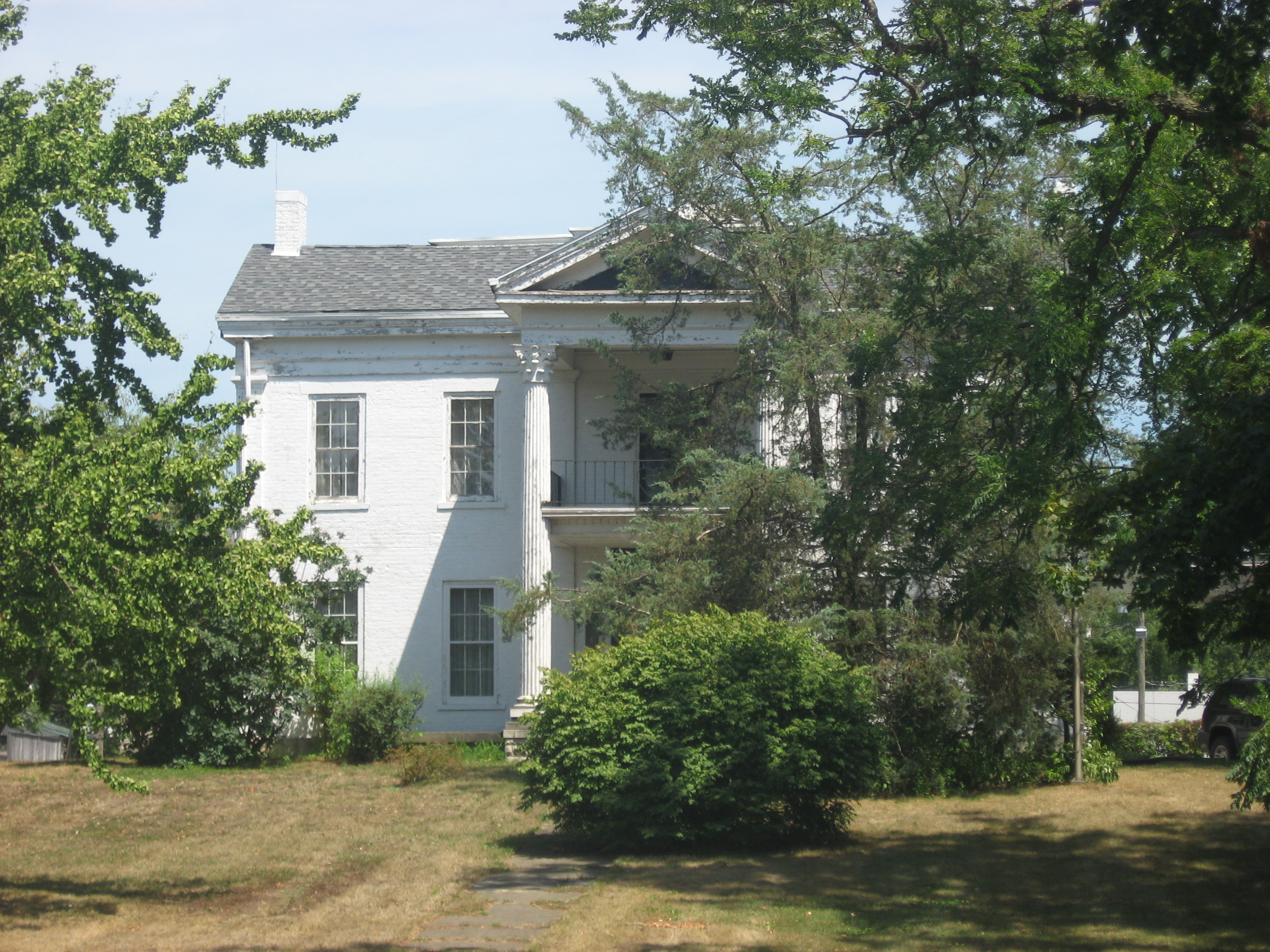
- Aaron Swayzee House, July 2012

- Location within Indiana Location within the United States
- Location: 224 N. Washington St., Marion, Indiana
- Coordinates: 40°33′50″N 85°39′32″W
- Area: 1 acre (0.40 ha)
- Built: 1855
- Architectural style: Greek Revival
- NRHP reference No.: 83000124
- Added to NRHP: June 16, 1983

Aaron Swayzee House, also known as the Swayzee-Love House, is a historic home located at Marion, Indiana. It was built in 1855, and is a two-story, L-shaped, Greek Revival style brick dwelling painted white. The front facade features a pedimented portico with two 22-foot tall Corinthian order columns and stained glass windows. It is one of the oldest houses in Marion and Grant County.

It was listed on the National Register of Historic Places in 1983.
