= Marion National Cemetery =

Veterans cemetery in Grant County, Indiana

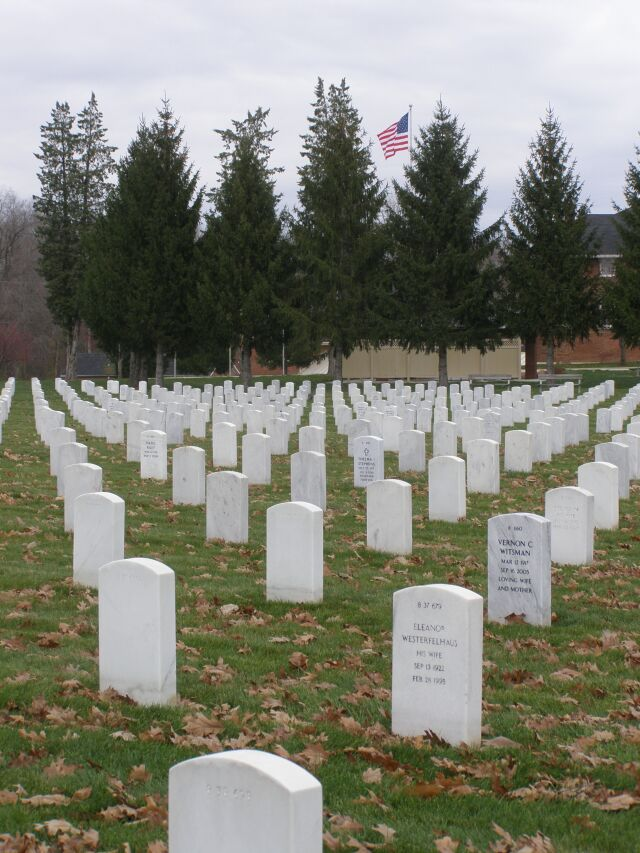
- Interactive map of Marion National Cemetery

Details
- Established: 1890
- Location: Marion, Indiana
- Country: United States
- Coordinates: 40°31′20″N 85°37′48″W
- Type: United States National Cemetery
- Size: 45.1 acres (18.3 ha),
- No. of graves: 13,000+
- Find a Grave: 109425

Marion National Cemetery is a United States National Cemetery located in the city of Marion in Grant County, Indiana. It encompasses 45.1 acres (18.3 ha), and as of the end of 2005, had 8,269 interments. It is included in the National Home for Disabled Volunteer Soldiers, Marion Branch national historic district.

== History ==
In 1888, Colonel George W. Steele, Indiana’s congressional representative, successfully convinced his colleagues in Washington, D.C., of the need for a Soldier's Home in Grant County. Subsequently, the 31-acre (13 ha) Marion Branch of the National Home opened in 1889 to provide shelter and comfort for the region's veterans. Along with the home, a cemetery was established for the interment of the men who died there. The first burial occurred two years after the home opened in May 1890. For most of its history, the cemetery at the Marion Home has quietly and efficiently cared for the needs of the nation's veterans with few significant changes.

In 1920, the home was renamed Marion Sanatorium and in 1930, administration of the home was transferred to the newly created Veterans Administration. Additional land was transferred from the Veterans Health Administration twice in the cemetery's history. 6 acres (2.4 ha) were added in 1974 and six more in 1988. As of 1973, with the passage of the National Cemetery Act, the cemetery became part of the National Cemetery system and its name was changed to Marion National Cemetery. As of 2004, over 8,000 men and women have been buried in Marion National Cemetery, including Medal of Honor recipients Henry Hyde, Nicholas Irwin and Jeremiah Kuder.

== Notable monuments ==
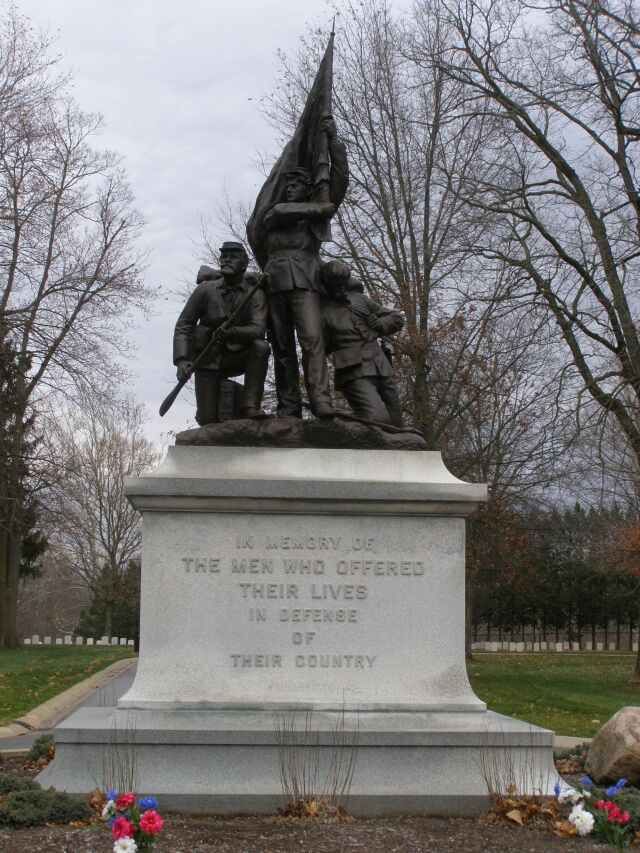
Civil War Memorial

- The Remember the Maine monument, erected in 1901 to honor of the lives lost aboard USS Maine in Havana Harbor, Cuba, the act which is widely believed to have precipitated the Spanish–American War.
- The carillon bell tower was erected in 1990.

== Notable interments ==
- Henry J. Hyde (1846–1893), Medal of Honor recipient for action in Arizona Territory during the Indian Wars.
- Nicholas Irwin (1833–1896), Medal of Honor recipient for action at the Battle of Mobile Bay aboard USS Brooklyn during the American Civil War.
- Jeremiah Kuder (1835–1916), Medal of Honor recipient for action at the Battle of Jonesborough during the Civil War.

== See also ==
- United States Department of Veterans Affairs
