= Homelake, Colorado =

Unincorporated community in Rio Grande County, CO, USA

- Unincorporated community
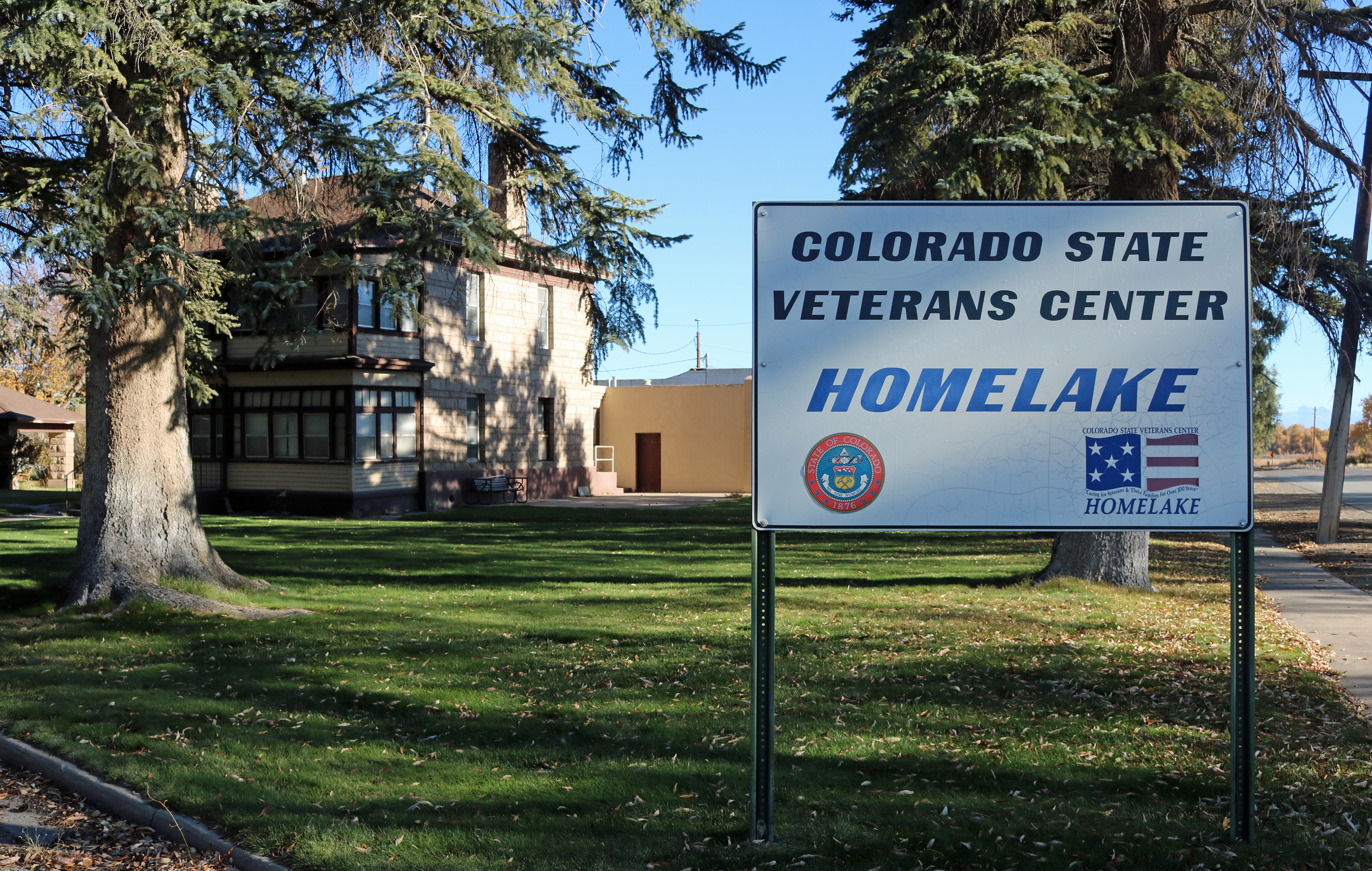
- The Veterans Community Living Center at Homelake

- Location within the state of Colorado
- Coordinates: 37°34′28″N 106°05′45″W
- Country: United States
- State: Colorado
- Counties: Rio Grande
- Elevation: 7,638 ft (2,328 m)
- Time zone: UTC-7 (MST)
  - Summer (DST): UTC-6 (MDT)
- ZIP code: 81135
- GNIS feature ID: 190407

Homelake is an unincorporated community located in Rio Grande County, Colorado, United States. The Homelake's ZIP code is 81135. The Homelake post office was discontinued in 1965.

== History ==
Homelake is the former location of the Colorado Soldiers' and Sailors' Home and is the location of the Homelake Civil War Cemetery.

== Geography ==
Homelake is north of combined US Route 160 and US Route 285 on State Highway 6.
