= National Home for Disabled Volunteer Soldiers, Marion Branch =

Historic district in Indiana, United States

- Marion Branch, National Home for Disabled Volunteer Soldiers Historic District
- U.S. National Register of Historic Places
- U.S. Historic district
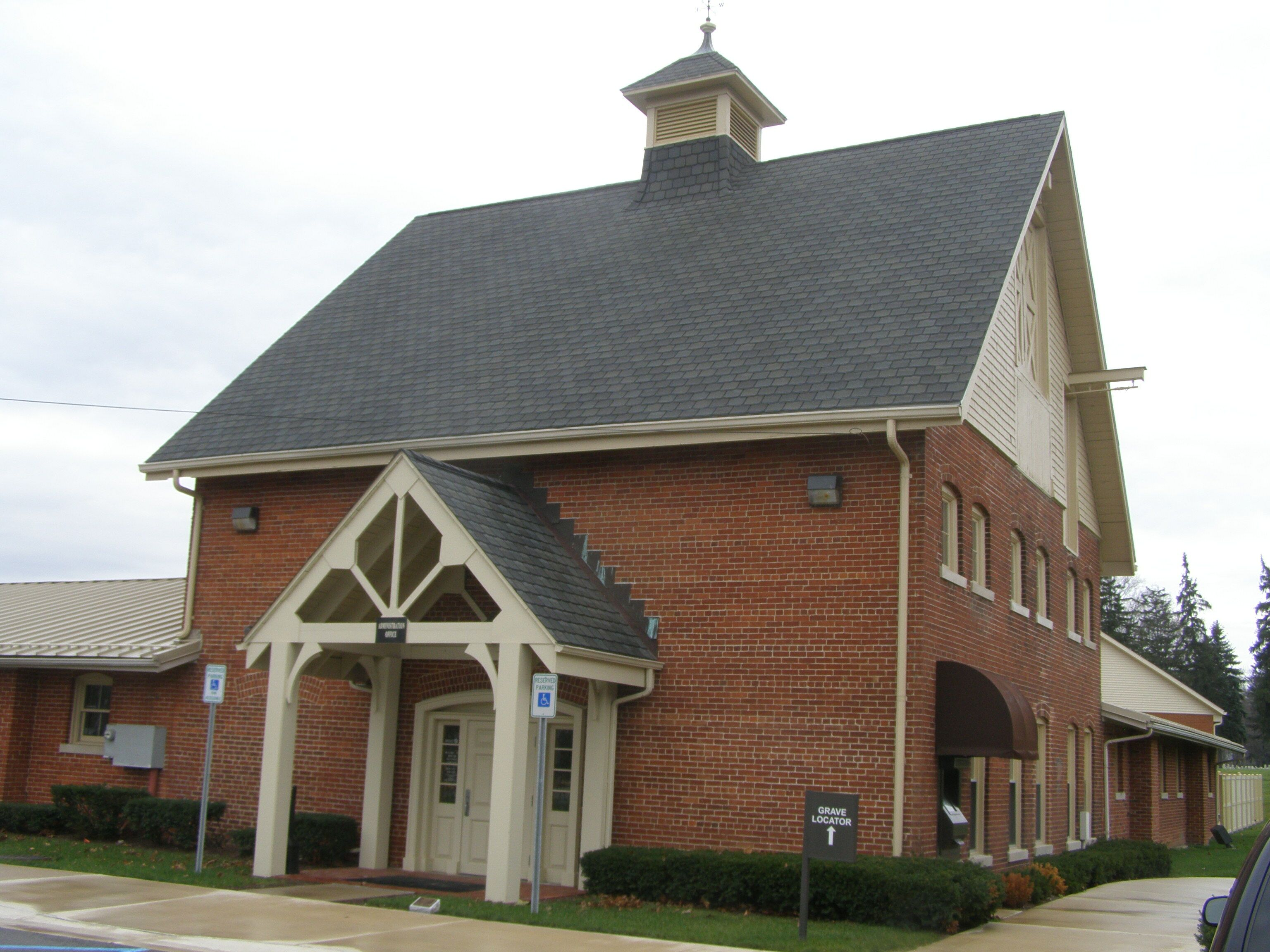
- The Administration Building

- Location within Indiana Location within the United States
- Location: 1700 E 38th St., Marion, Indiana
- Coordinates: 40°31′12″N 85°38′02″W
- Area: 151 acres (61 ha)
- Built: 1890
- Architect: Peters & Burns
- Architectural style: Queen Anne, Colonial Revival
- NRHP reference No.: 99000833
- Added to NRHP: August 2, 1999

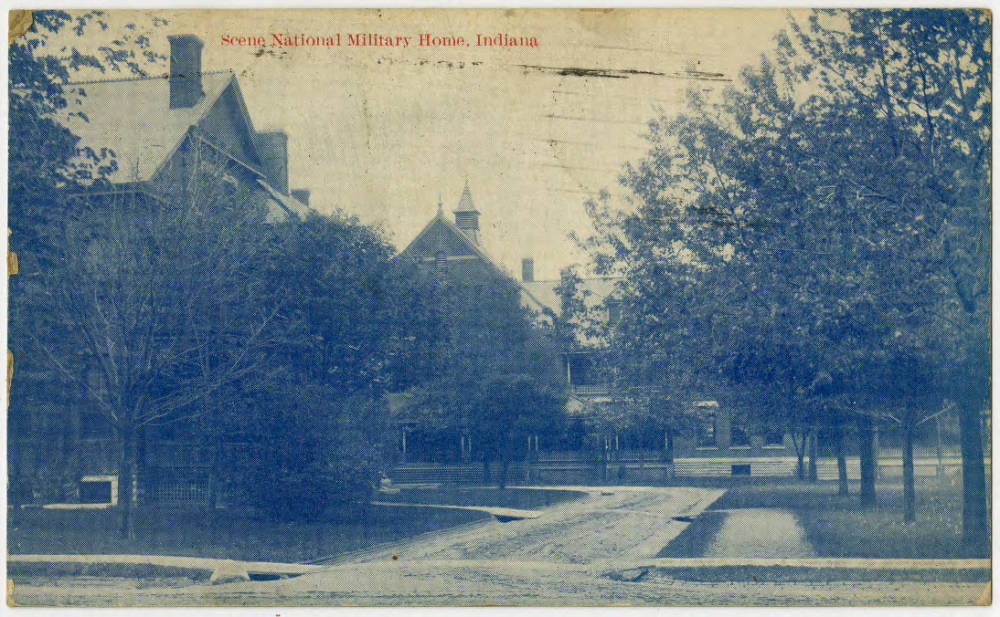
National Home for Disabled Volunteer Soldiers postcard. 1911

The National Home for Disabled Volunteer Soldiers, Marion Branch is a historic old soldiers' home located in Marion, Indiana. The hospital, along with Marion National Cemetery were listed on the National Register of Historic Places in 1999 as a national historic district.

== History ==
On July 23, 1888, with increasing membership amongst the six National Homes for Disabled Volunteer Soldiers (NHDVS), Congress established the seventh of ten national old soldiers' homes in Grant County, Indiana to be known as the Marion Branch. Congress allotted an appropriation of $200,000, while the Grant County residents provided a natural gas supply for the heating and lighting of this new facility. Marion, Indiana was selected as a site for the new branch due to the availability of natural gas and the political efforts of George Washington Steele.

=== George Washington Steele ===
During his last term, Colonel George Washington Steele introduced legislation for establishing a branch home in Grant County in the fiftieth session of congress, the measure coming up in December, and for seven months he watched the proceedings. Colonel Steele was not optimistic about the chances of Grant County receiving the National Home. In a letter sent to Simon Goldthwait two days before Congress approved the measure, Colonel Steele said that the bill "was in real danger." The bill was approved by an Act of Congress and signed by President Grover Cleveland on July 23, 1888, entitled: "An Act to authorize the location of a Branch Home for Disabled Volunteer Soldiers in Grant County, Indiana, and For Other Purposes." This legislation required a tract of land of at least 200 acres (0.81 km^{2}) with a natural gas well or wells on the site. The cost of drilling the wells was to be paid by Grant County citizens. Once the site and the gas supply were provided, the Board of Managers would begin construction within six months. The initial Congressional appropriation for the project was $200,000.

Approval of Steele's bill was received with great enthusiasm in Marion, where the local newspaper predicted that the expenditure for the branch would total at least $500,000. News of the bills passing was favorably received in Grant County and on July 30, 1888, a celebration took place and it was estimated that the streets of Marion were thronged with the largest assemblage ever reported in Marion.

=== Construction ===
By October 1888, a 220-acre (0.89 km^{2}) tract had been purchased by a group of local citizens for donation to the Federal government for the National Home site. This tract was located in North Marion in a bend of the Mississinewa River on the "hilliest body of land in Grant County" from which there were views to the east and north as well as south to Marion. However, this site proved to be unacceptable because the natural gas wells drilled on it were inadequate. Other sites were proposed.

In February 1889, General Lew A. Harris and Colonel J. B. Thomas, serving as advisers to the Board of Managers, visited Marion to inspect possible sites for the branch. They made their headquarters the Spencer House. On March 2, 1889, an announcement was made that the selection of a site along Jonesboro Pike, 2 ½ miles southeast of town, was announced. The site was assembled from 76.41 acres (309,200 m^{2}) of Geiger owned farmland which was purchased on March 28, 1889, and 140.43 acres (0.5683 km^{2}) of land purchased from Isaac Elliott on April 10, 1889. These two tracts were purchased for approximately $110 per acre. The Federal Government only authorized up to $90 per acre, and therefore, local Grant County citizens donated the additional monies to ensure the construction of the Marion Branch. The site was later enlarged with the purchase of three additional tracts in 1894, 1896, and 1897, for a total of 298.84.

On May 2, 1889, a group of men headed by Colonel Harris arrived to visit the home site. While visiting a demonstration of the natural gas well was given. This well is located east, across the street from Building 23. Construction of the Marion Branch began in 1889. A brick works was located on an adjacent farm which supplied the bricks for the original structures.

The official opening for the Marion National Home was on March 18, 1890. The cost of land, buildings and permanent improvements totaled $698,000. Enrollment at the Marion Branch in 1890 was 586. The main hospital building, Building 19, was completed and patients began to be treated in the facility. Female nurses arrived for work from Cincinnati.

=== Operations ===
By 1892 a request for two additional barracks was made due to the VA reaching its veteran capacity of 1,241 members. During this time, members were sleeping on the floor due to lack of space. Enrollment steadily rose to reach 1782 members in 1901. With enrollment increasing due to the veterans returning from World War I, and with the 1917 amendment allowing all veterans the same medical care, additions to the National Home became necessary. By 1919, approximately 60 additional buildings had been constructed to include memorials, a fire station, warehouses, additional quarters, supply buildings, and greenhouses.

The Marion Branch and all other homes were opened to both the white veteran and members of the United States Colored Troops. This integration was a full eighty years before the United States had fully integrated military units. The integration was rudimentary by today's standards. When the numbers permitted there were separate barracks and separate tables in the dining hall, but each man wore the same uniform, ate the same meals and performed similar duties.

=== World War I veterans ===
In 1921, the Marion Branch became the Marion National Sanitarium, a facility dedicated to the treatment World War I neuropsychiatric cases, including what was then called shell shock and other mental disorders.

In August 1921, Congress acted to consolidate all veterans' benefits into a single independent agency, the Veterans Bureau. On April 29, 1922, this agency assumed responsibility for fifty-seven veterans' hospitals operated by the Public Health Service as well as nine under construction by the Treasury Department.

By 1926, the Board began to see a new trend in veterans' use of the National Home. For the most part, the World War I veterans were receiving medical treatment and returning to civilian life rather than entering the domiciliary program for the Home. The Board noted that hospital care costs were almost three times the cost of domiciliary care and required large capital investments in hospitals, medical equipment, and professional staff. By 1928, the Board concluded that it was not capable of managing the National Home as a national medical service. In June 1929, the president of the Board of Managers was named to the Federal Commission for Consideration of Government Activities Dealing with Veterans' Matters; the work of this commission resulted in the creation of the Veterans Administration.

== End of the National Home ==
In 1930 the National Home for Disabled Volunteer Soldiers, Veterans Bureau, and Bureau of Pensions were consolidated together into the new Veterans Administration. The National Home for Disabled Volunteer Soldiers was renamed the "Home Service" within it. The Marion Branch was then renamed the Veterans Affairs Medical Center, Marion, Indiana.

In 1996, the facility was integrated with the Fort Wayne facility by the United States Department of Veterans Affairs, becoming the VA Northern Indiana Health Care System, Marion Campus.

== Cemetery ==
A burial ground of 61.5 acres (249,000 m^{2}) was set aside from the buildings in memory of the men who offered their lives in defense of their country.

"The Silent Circle" is designated as Section 1, which consists of seven concentric rows of graves. Each grave has a plain marble marker with the name of the deceased, along with the rank and regiment. Each marker is numbered in succession but does not indicate any order of death.

There is a section that was reserved for the burial of employees and their families to include the first governor of The Home and the first surgeon of the hospital.

== Gallery ==
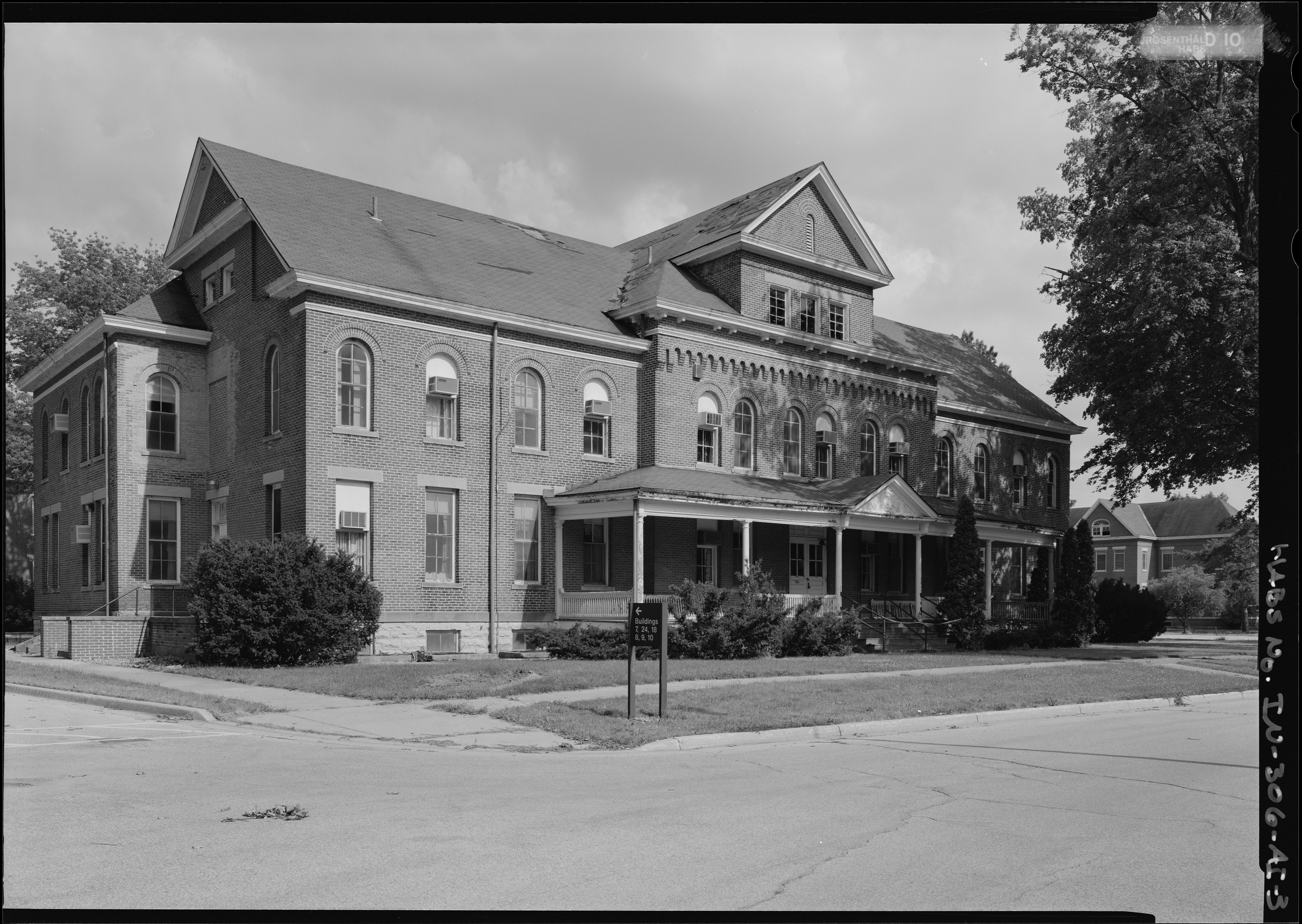
Building No. 60, HABS Photo

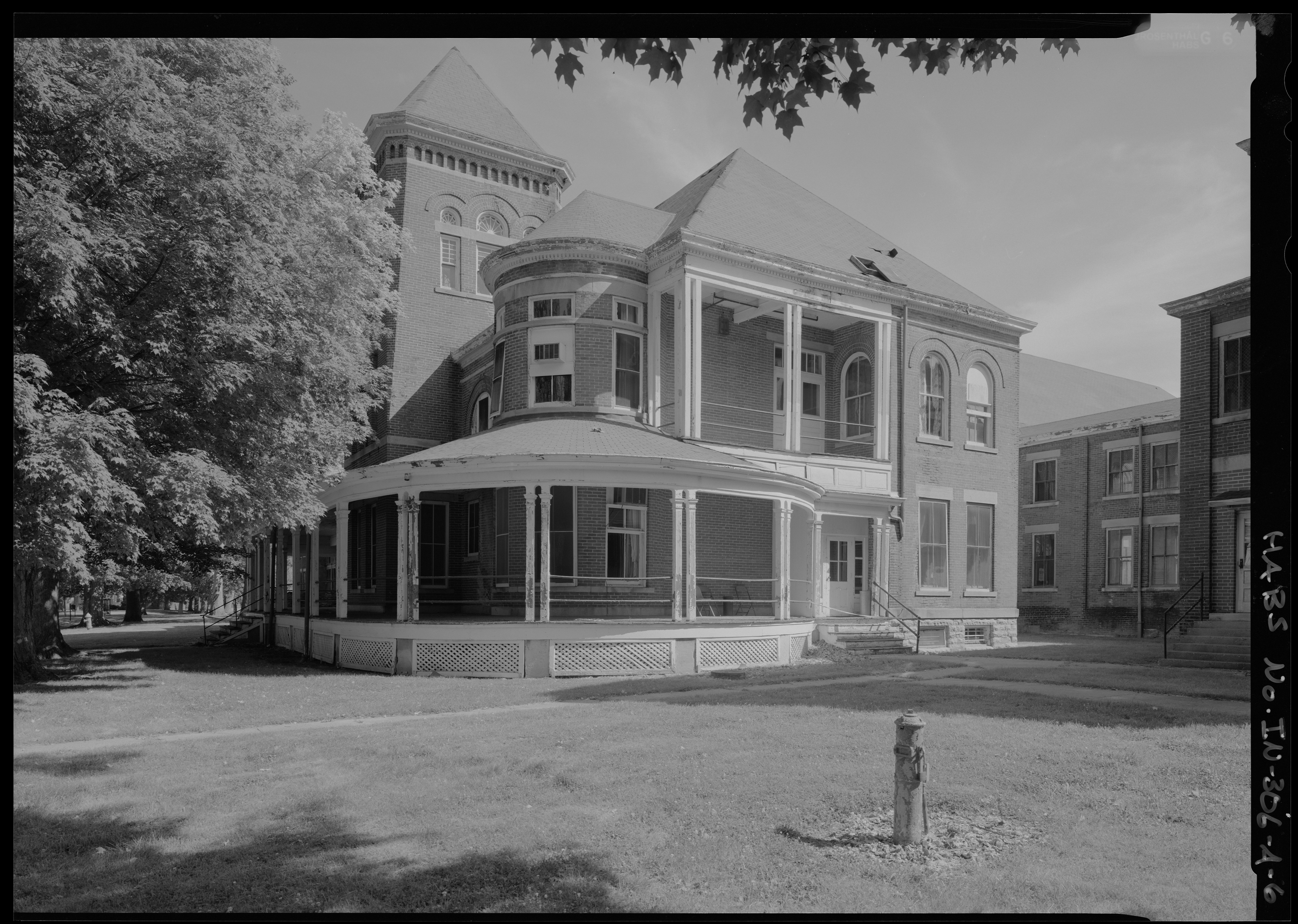
Building Nos. 19 and 20, HABS Photo

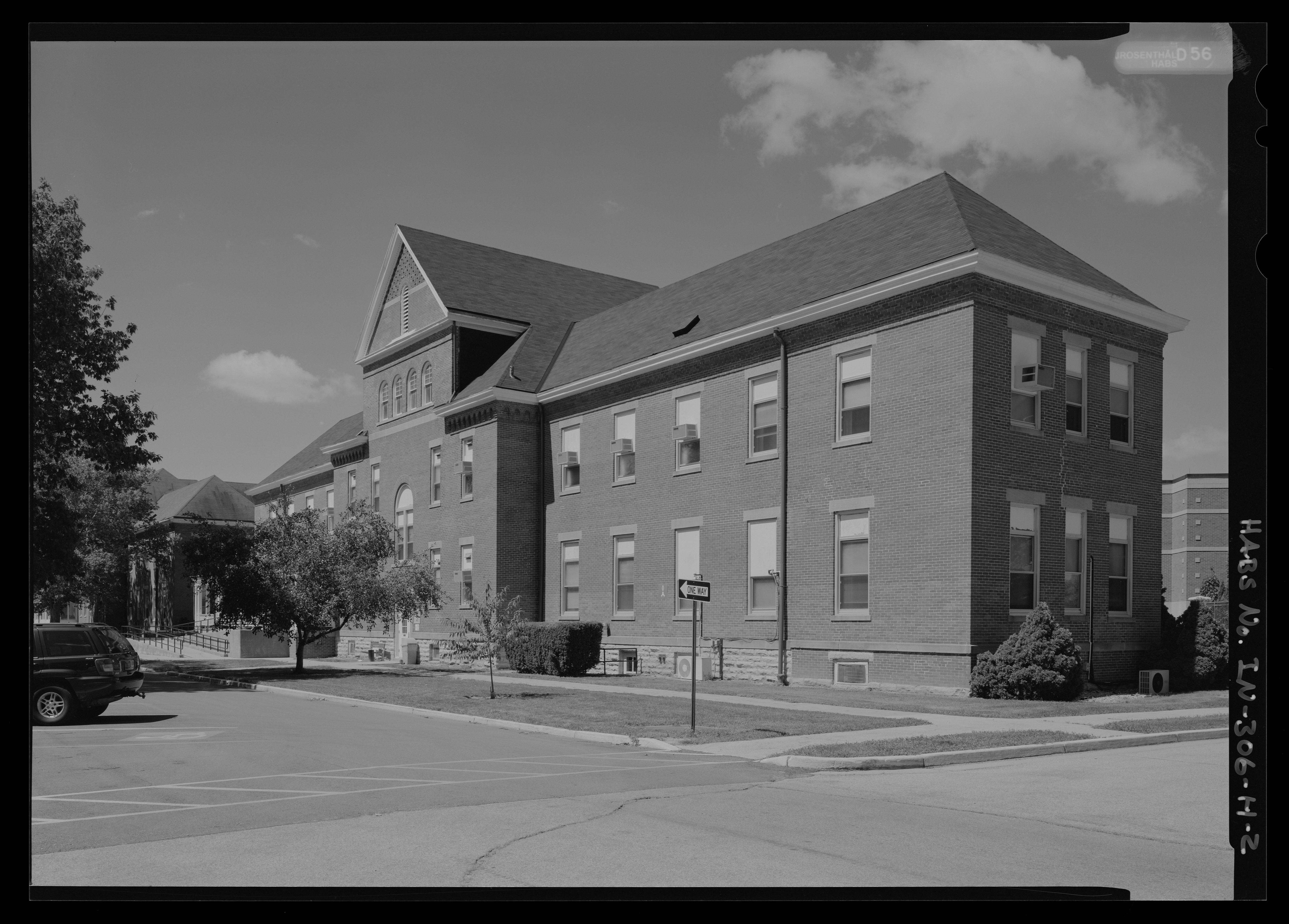
Building No. 2, HABS Photo

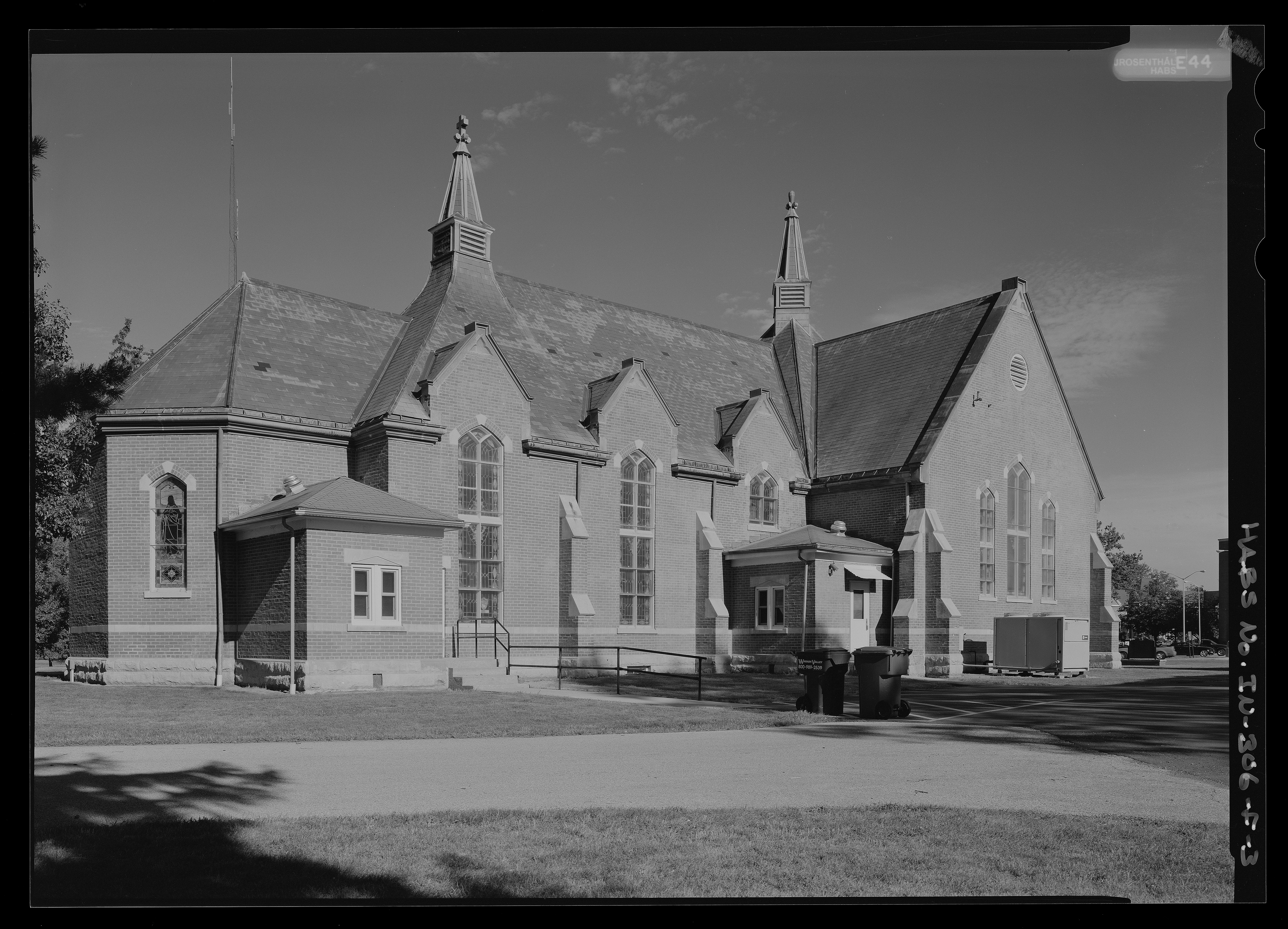
Chapel, HABS Photo

== See also ==
- National Home for Disabled Volunteer Soldiers
- Old soldiers' homes in the United States
