= Abijah C. Jay House =

Historic house in Indiana, United States

- U.S. National Register of Historic Places
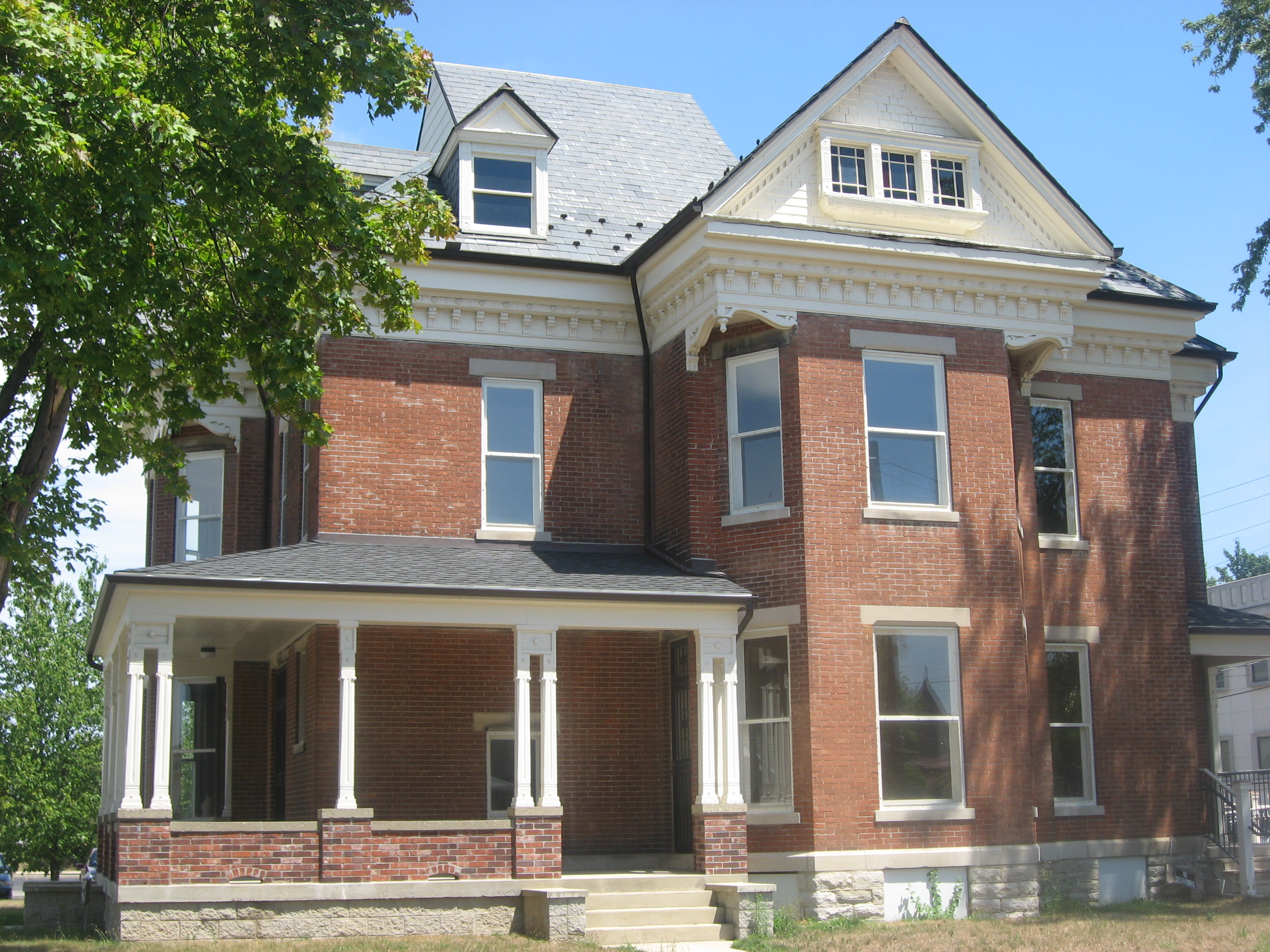
- Abijah C. Jay House, July 2012

- Location within Indiana Location within the United States
- Location: 118 W 7th St., Marion, Indiana
- Coordinates: 40°33′18″N 85°39′38″W
- Area: less than one acre
- Built: 1888
- Architectural style: Queen Anne
- NRHP reference No.: 03000145
- Added to NRHP: March 27, 2003

Abijah C. Jay House is a historic home located at Marion, Indiana. It was built in 1888, and is a two-story, Queen Anne style brick dwelling. It has a compound slate hipped roof with gables and wraparound front porch.

It was listed on the National Register of Historic Places in 2003.
