= Marion, Indiana =

Marion
- City
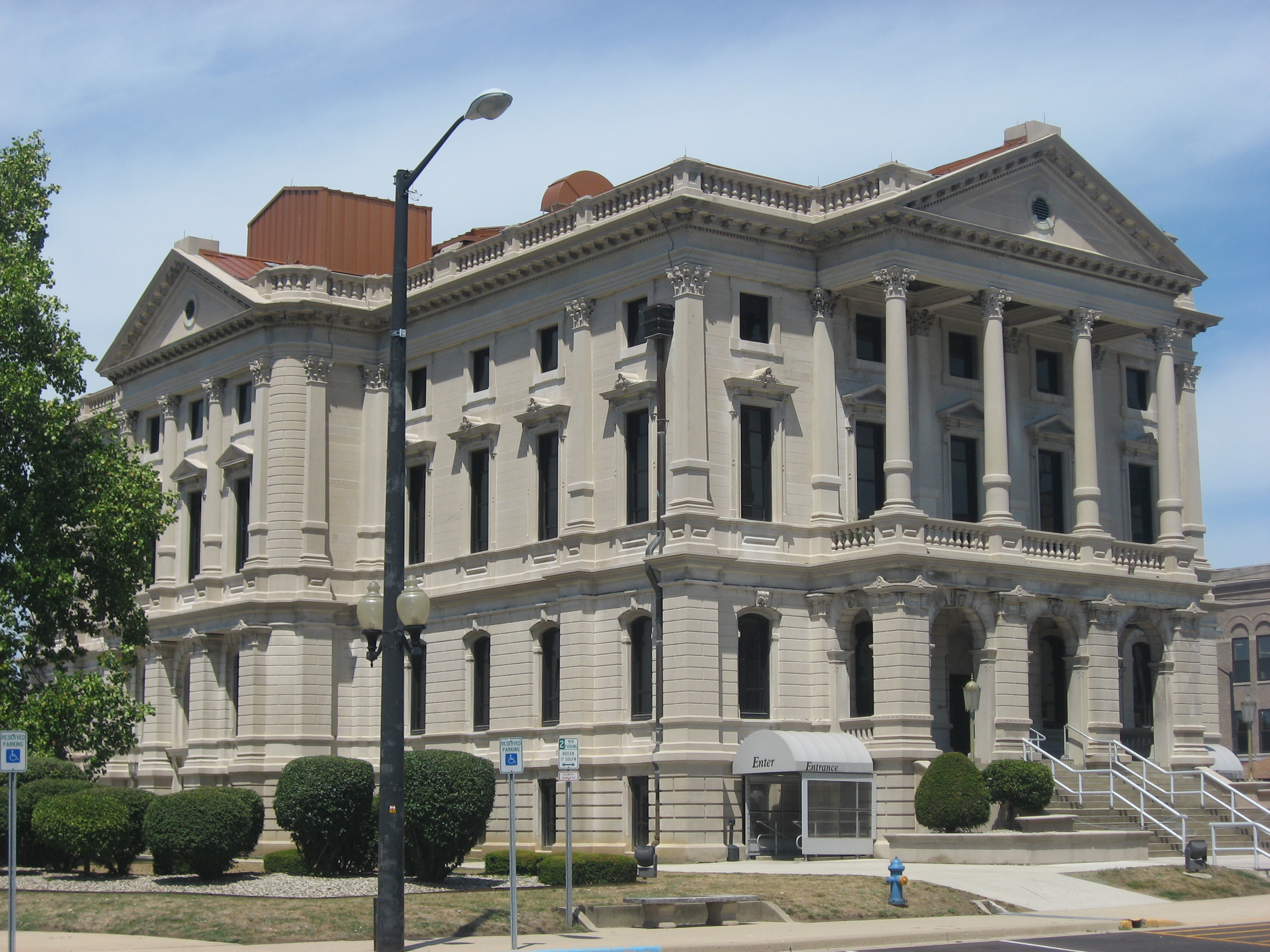
- Grant County Courthouse

- Flag
- Nickname: City of Champions
- Location of Marion in Grant County
- Coordinates: 40°32′59″N 85°39′37″W
- Country: United States
- State: Indiana
- County: Grant
- Townships: Center, Franklin, Pleasant, Washington, Monroe, Mill, Liberty
- Founded: 1831
- Incorporated (city): 1889

Government
  - Type: Mayor-Council
  - Mayor: Ronald Douglas Morrell Jr. (R)

Area
  - Total: 15.76 sq mi (40.82 km^{2})
  - Land: 15.68 sq mi (40.61 km^{2})
  - Water: 0.081 sq mi (0.21 km^{2}) 0.51%
- Elevation: 814 ft (248 m)

Population (2020)
  - Total: 28,310
  - Density: 1,805.5/sq mi (697.11/km^{2})
- Time zone: UTC−5:00 (EST)
  - Summer (DST): UTC−4:00 (EDT)
- ZIP Codes: 46952-46953
- Area code: 765
- FIPS code: 18-46908
- GNIS feature ID: 2395009
- Website: City of Marion website

Marion is a city in and the county seat of Grant County, Indiana, United States, along the Mississinewa River. The population was 28,310 as of the 2020 census. It is named for Francis Marion, a brigadier general from South Carolina in the American Revolutionary War.

The city is home to Indiana Wesleyan University, the largest evangelical Christian university in the Midwest and Indiana's largest private university, when online and regional campuses in Indiana, Kentucky, Ohio, and Illinois are included. The traditional campus enrolls about 2,800 students. Marion is the birthplace of actor James Dean and cartoonist Jim Davis, and was the location of the wedding of actress Julia Roberts and singer Lyle Lovett in 1993. Ronald Douglas Morrell Jr. is the city's first African American mayor and has been mayor since 2024.

== History ==
=== Founding ===
The Battle of the Mississinewa was fought in December 1812, north of the current city of Marion, as an expeditionary force sent by William Henry Harrison against the Miami villages. Today, the battle is reenacted every fall by residents of Grant County and many reenactors and enthusiasts from throughout the United States and Canada during the annual Mississinewa 1812 festival, the largest War of 1812 reenactment in the United States. When Martin Boots and David Branson each donated 30 acres (120,000 m^{2}) of land in 1831 for the site of Marion, they chose a location on the left bank of the swift, scenic river which the Miami Indians had named "Mississinewa," meaning "Falling water." So rapid had been the tide of settlement that it followed by only 19 years the Battle of Mississinewa, 7 miles (11 km) downstream, where federal troops and Indians had fought a bloody, pre-dawn encounter in 1812.

With the formation of Grant County in 1831, Marion was established as the county seat and its future was assured. The river provided water supply, power, and drainage as it flowed at the base of the nearby hills. Along with at least 36 other communities in the nation, Marion was named for the Revolutionary War General Francis Marion, the "Swamp Fox" of South Carolina.

=== Industrial growth ===
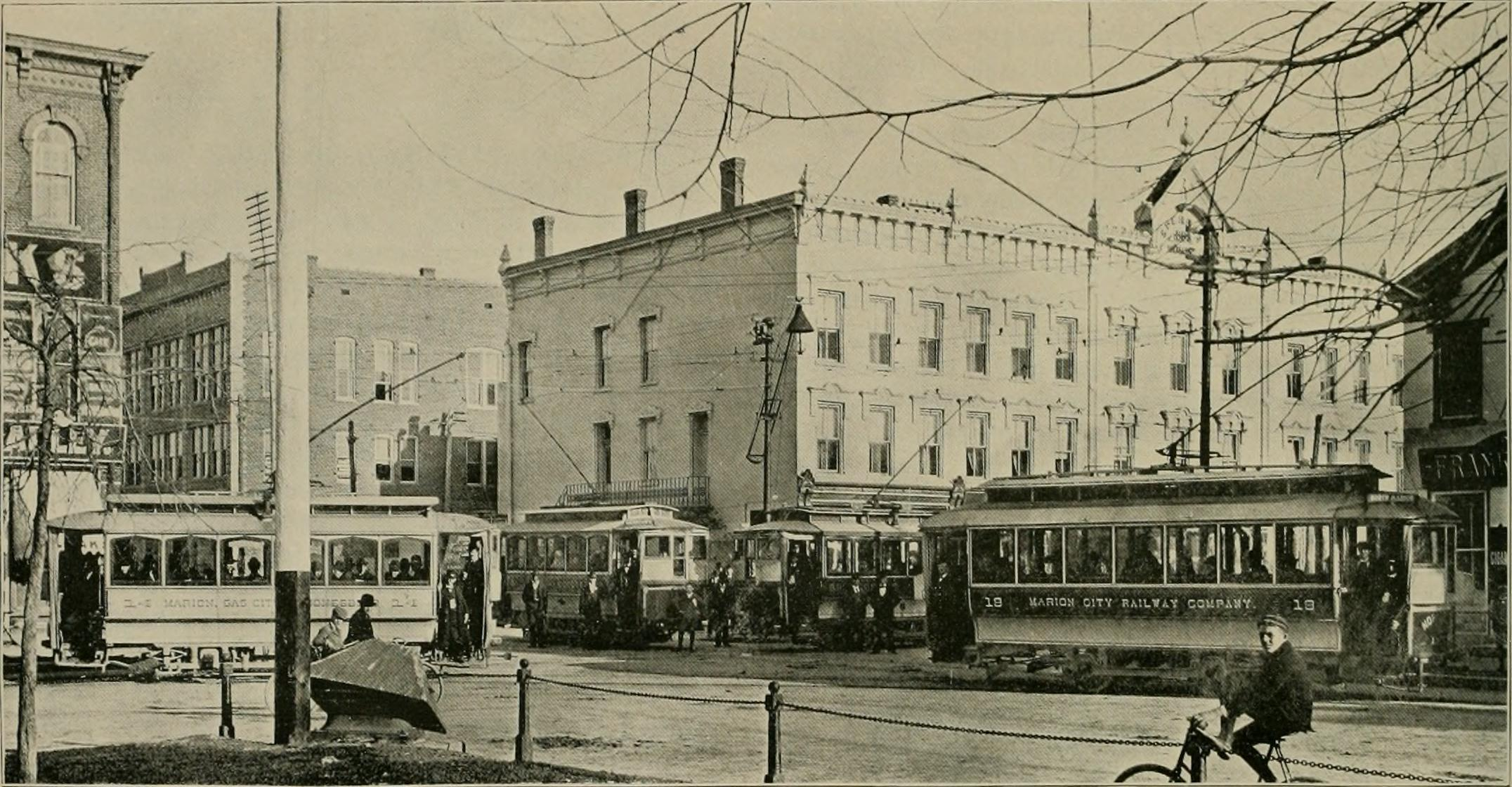
Streetcars in Marion, 1891

Marion grew slowly for more than 50 years as an agricultural trading center supported by a sprinkling of small farm- and forest-related industries. Native Americans were a common sight as they traveled there from Indiana's last reservation, with its Indian school, Baptist Church, and cemetery, 8 miles (13 km) away. In the 1880s, fields of natural gas were discovered across much of east-central Indiana, and Grant County began to grow at a dizzying pace during the Indiana gas boom. Gas City and Matthews were carved out of raw farmland and launched as speculative boom towns, each absorbing existing tiny villages. They attracted several thousand residents before the gas reserves were tapped and most industries left. As late as the 1940s, Matthews resembled a Western ghost town, before it attracted eleven glass factories and drew the professional baseball team away from Indianapolis. Grant County's only covered bridge remains there as a link to the past. However, the gas boom left its legacy. A few industries remained, particularly glass manufacturers.

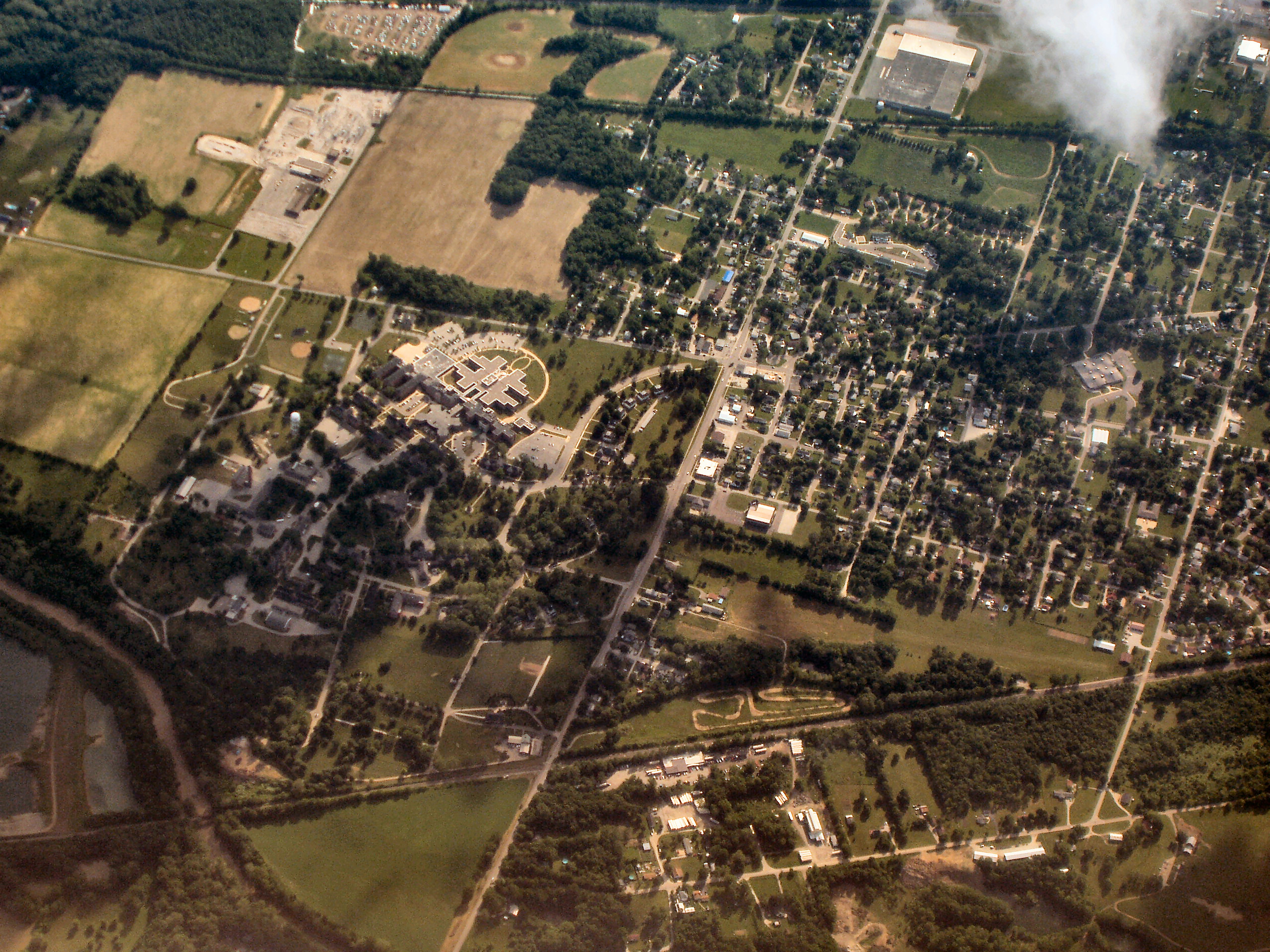
VA hospital campus (left) south of Marion's downtown

On July 23, 1888, with increasing number of residents at the six HDVS, Congress established a seventh home in Grant County (and ultimately three more). It is known as the Marion Branch. Congress allotted an appropriation of $200,000 for construction, while Grant County residents provided a natural gas supply for heating and lighting. Marion was selected as a site for the new branch due to the availability of natural gas and the political support of Colonel George Washington Steele, US Congressman serving from 1880 to 1890. This facility is now a part of the Veterans Administration (VA) Northern Indiana Health Care System, a dual-campus facility associated with the former VA Medical Center Fort Wayne. In the early 21st century, the original treatment hospital, built in 1889, the greenhouse, and cadet quarters are scheduled for demolition. There has been a lack of public support for funding restoration of these buildings. As they do not meet current standards, the Veterans Administration plans to demolish the buildings and replace them.

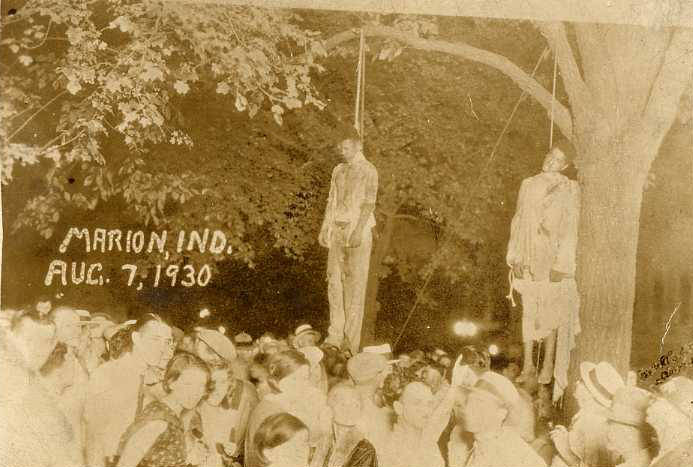
Thomas Shipp and Abram Smith were lynched in Marion in 1930

In 1930, two African-American men, Thomas Shipp and Abram Smith, were lynched in Marion for allegedly killing a white man and raping his girlfriend. A white mob estimated at 5,000 gathered at the county jail where Shipp, Smith, and activist James Cameron, were dragged from the jail and severely beaten.

=== Modern history ===
Marion's prosperity plateaued between the end of the gas boom, just prior to World War I, and 1955. But construction of a General Motors stamping and tool plant created many new jobs. The city grew rapidly. Except for bedroom communities near metropolitan centers, Marion's growth during the 1950s exceeded all but one Indiana city with populations of 10,000-100,000.

In the late 20th century, Marion surveyed its significant properties and defined the main buildings and grounds of the hospital as the Marion Branch Historic District. It is located at the intersection of 38th Street and Lincoln Boulevard, approximately 2 1/2 miles southeast of the center of Marion. The boundaries are 38th Street on the north, the railroad right-of-way on the east, the Mississinewa River on the southeast, Chambers Park on the south and southeast, and Lincoln Boulevard to the west. The 212-acre (0.86 km^{2}) site is roughly square in form with diagonal boundary lines on the southeast and the southwest eliminating those corners of the square. Originally, farming operations on the home grounds included the area that is now Chambers Park. In 1981, a Determination of Eligibility for the National Register of Historic Places for Federal Properties was made under Criteria A and C. As a result, since 1981, various projects have been reviewed by the Indiana State Preservation Office for compliance under Section 106 of the National Historic Preservation Act of 1966, as amended. In 1992, the historic district was surveyed by the Indiana Department of Natural Resources as a component of the Grant County inventory of historic sites and structures.

One of Marion's more notable architectural landmarks is the extensive Marion High School campus, which includes a 1,468-seat community auditorium, home of the Marion Philharmonic Orchestra, the Community School for the Arts, and the Mississinewa Valley Community Band. The city has a lending library, the Marion Public Library.

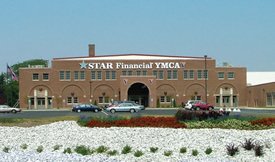
YMCA of Grant County

The eight-time state basketball champions, Marion Giants, play in the 7,500 seat Bill Green Athletic Arena. The city operates a 2.75-mile (4.43 km) Riverwalk from downtown to Matter Park, and there is a newly renovated $9,000,000 YMCA Memorial Coliseum to honor war veterans. This was the previous home of the Giants, which was built after their first State Basketball Title in 1926.

A publicly owned mansion, the Hostess House, is used for social functions. Marion General Hospital is located here.

== Geography ==
Marion is located along the Mississinewa River.

According to the 2010 census, Marion has a total area of 15.794 square miles (40.91 km^{2}), of which 15.71 square miles (40.69 km^{2}) (or 99.47%) is land and 0.084 square miles (0.22 km^{2}) (or 0.53%) is water.

=== Climate ===
Climate data for Marion, Indiana (1991–2020 normals, extremes 1893–present)
Month	Jan	Feb	Mar	Apr	May	Jun	Jul	Aug	Sep	Oct	Nov	Dec	Year
Record high °F (°C)	71 (22)	76 (24)	86 (30)	95 (35)	100 (38)	103 (39)	108 (42)	103 (39)	102 (39)	92 (33)	84 (29)	71 (22)	108 (42)
Mean maximum °F (°C)	56.4 (13.6)	60.0 (15.6)	71.2 (21.8)	80.2 (26.8)	87.8 (31.0)	92.1 (33.4)	92.8 (33.8)	91.0 (32.8)	89.6 (32.0)	82.5 (28.1)	69.2 (20.7)	58.4 (14.7)	94.3 (34.6)
Mean daily maximum °F (°C)	33.0 (0.6)	37.0 (2.8)	48.1 (8.9)	61.2 (16.2)	72.0 (22.2)	80.8 (27.1)	83.8 (28.8)	82.0 (27.8)	76.6 (24.8)	64.2 (17.9)	49.7 (9.8)	38.0 (3.3)	60.5 (15.8)
Daily mean °F (°C)	25.4 (−3.7)	28.2 (−2.1)	38.0 (3.3)	49.6 (9.8)	60.6 (15.9)	70.0 (21.1)	73.2 (22.9)	71.3 (21.8)	64.9 (18.3)	53.0 (11.7)	40.7 (4.8)	30.5 (−0.8)	50.4 (10.2)
Mean daily minimum °F (°C)	17.7 (−7.9)	19.5 (−6.9)	28.0 (−2.2)	38.0 (3.3)	49.2 (9.6)	59.2 (15.1)	62.5 (16.9)	60.5 (15.8)	53.3 (11.8)	41.9 (5.5)	31.7 (−0.2)	23.0 (−5.0)	40.4 (4.7)
Mean minimum °F (°C)	−3.0 (−19.4)	3.0 (−16.1)	12.4 (−10.9)	25.0 (−3.9)	34.5 (1.4)	46.1 (7.8)	52.0 (11.1)	51.1 (10.6)	40.9 (4.9)	29.2 (−1.6)	18.4 (−7.6)	5.6 (−14.7)	−6.7 (−21.5)
Record low °F (°C)	−23 (−31)	−20 (−29)	−11 (−24)	5 (−15)	26 (−3)	34 (1)	43 (6)	38 (3)	28 (−2)	15 (−9)	−5 (−21)	−22 (−30)	−23 (−31)
Average precipitation inches (mm)	2.85 (72)	2.15 (55)	2.87 (73)	4.10 (104)	4.76 (121)	4.42 (112)	4.33 (110)	3.93 (100)	3.39 (86)	3.12 (79)	3.26 (83)	2.58 (66)	41.76 (1,061)
Average snowfall inches (cm)	8.1 (21)	6.3 (16)	3.7 (9.4)	0.3 (0.76)	0.0 (0.0)	0.0 (0.0)	0.0 (0.0)	0.0 (0.0)	0.0 (0.0)	0.1 (0.25)	1.0 (2.5)	5.0 (13)	24.5 (62)
Average precipitation days (≥ 0.01 in)	11.5	9.2	10.2	12.0	12.7	11.0	9.6	8.8	8.2	9.7	9.6	10.2	122.7
Average snowy days (≥ 0.1 in)	5.4	4.4	1.5	0.2	0.0	0.0	0.0	0.0	0.0	0.0	0.8	3.3	15.6
Source: NOAA

== Demographics ==
Historical population
Census	Pop.	Note	%±
1850	703		—
1870	1,658		—
1880	3,182		91.9%
1890	8,759		175.3%
1900	17,337		97.9%
1910	19,359		11.7%
1920	23,747		22.7%
1930	24,496		3.2%
1940	26,767		9.3%
1950	30,081		12.4%
1960	37,854		25.8%
1970	39,607		4.6%
1980	35,874		−9.4%
1990	32,618		−9.1%
2000	31,320		−4.0%
2010	29,948		−4.4%
2020	28,310		−5.5%
Source: US Census Bureau

=== Racial and ethnic composition ===
Marion city, Indiana – Racial and ethnic composition Note: the US Census treats Hispanic/Latino as an ethnic category. This table excludes Latinos from the racial categories and assigns them to a separate category. Hispanics/Latinos may be of any race.
Race / Ethnicity (NH = Non-Hispanic)	Pop 2000	Pop 2010	Pop 2020	% 2000	% 2010	% 2020
White alone (NH)	24,381	22,704	19,740	77.84%	75.81%	69.73%
Black or African American alone (NH)	4,830	4,337	4,058	15.42%	14.48%	14.33%
Native American or Alaska Native alone (NH)	134	105	74	0.43%	0.35%	0.26%
Asian alone (NH)	212	221	286	0.68%	0.74%	1.01%
Pacific Islander alone (NH)	6	4	15	0.02%	0.01%	0.05%
Some Other Race alone (NH)	60	54	145	0.19%	0.18%	0.51%
Mixed race or Multiracial (NH)	569	867	1,730	1.82%	2.90%	6.11%
Hispanic or Latino (any race)	1,128	1,656	2,262	3.60%	5.53%	7.99%
Total	31,320	29,948	28,310	100.00%	100.00%	100.00%

=== 2020 census ===
As of the 2020 census, Marion had a population of 28,310. The median age was 37.6 years. 20.5% of residents were under the age of 18 and 18.6% of residents were 65 years of age or older. For every 100 females there were 89.9 males, and for every 100 females age 18 and over there were 86.3 males age 18 and over.

98.5% of residents lived in urban areas, while 1.5% lived in rural areas.

There were 11,430 households in Marion, of which 25.5% had children under the age of 18 living in them. Of all households, 31.5% were married-couple households, 23.4% were households with a male householder and no spouse or partner present, and 36.9% were households with a female householder and no spouse or partner present. About 39.6% of all households were made up of individuals and 16.8% had someone living alone who was 65 years of age or older.

There were 13,410 housing units, of which 14.8% were vacant. The homeowner vacancy rate was 3.8% and the rental vacancy rate was 11.9%.

Racial composition as of the 2020 census
Race	Number	Percent
White	20,391	72.0%
Black or African American	4,161	14.7%
American Indian and Alaska Native	118	0.4%
Asian	289	1.0%
Native Hawaiian and Other Pacific Islander	15	0.1%
Some other race	796	2.8%
Two or more races	2,540	9.0%
Hispanic or Latino (of any race)	2,262	8.0%

=== 2010 census ===
As of the 2010 United States census, there were 29,948 people, 11,828 households, and 6,739 families in the city. The population density was 1,906.3 inhabitants per square mile (736.0/km^{2}). There were 13,715 housing units at an average density of 873.0 per square mile (337.1/km^{2}). The racial makeup of the city was 78.1% White, 14.7% African American, 0.4% Native American, 0.7% Asian, 2.4% from other races, and 3.6% from two or more races. Hispanic or Latino of any race were 5.5% of the population.

There were 11,828 households, of which 27.9% had children under the age of 18 living with them, 35.2% were married couples living together, 17.0% had a female householder with no husband present, 4.8% had a male householder with no wife present, and 43.0% were non-families. 36.7% of all households were made up of individuals, and 14.7% had someone living alone who was 65 years of age or older. The average household size was 2.25 and the average family size was 2.91.

The median age in the city was 36.2 years. 21.1% of residents were under the age of 18; 16.3% were between the ages of 18 and 24; 22.1% were from 25 to 44; 24.5% were from 45 to 64; and 16% were 65 years of age or older. The gender makeup of the city was 47.0% male and 53.0% female.

=== 2000 census ===
As of the 2000 United States census, of 2000, there were 31,320 residents. The population density was 2,355.5 inhabitants per square mile (909.5/km^{2}). There were 13,820 housing units at an average density of 1,039.4 per square mile (401.3/km^{2}). The racial makeup of the city was 79.64% White, 15.57% African American, 0.47% Native American, 0.68% Asian, 0.02% Pacific Islander, 1.43% from other races, and 2.18% from two or more races. 3.60% of the population were Hispanic or Latino of any race.

There were 12,462 households, out of which 27.3% had children under the age of 18 living with them, 42.1% were married couples living together, 14.7% had a female householder with no husband present, and 38.8% were non-families. 33.8% of all households were made up of individuals, and 14.2% had someone living alone who was 65 years of age or older. The average household size was 2.30 and the average family size was 2.91.

The city population contained 23.3% under the age of 18, 12.5% from 18 to 24, 26.0% from 25 to 44, 21.3% from 45 to 64, and 17.0% over 64 years. The median age was 36 years. For every 100 females, there were 88.6 males. For every 100 females age 18 and over, there were 84.1 males.

The median income for a household in the city was $30,440, and the median income for a family was $37,717. Males had a median income of $30,258 versus $23,467 for females. The per capita income for the city wa $16,378. 16.9% of the population and 12.6% of families were below the poverty line. Out of the total population, 23.8% of those under the age of 18 and 11.3% of those 65 and older were living below the poverty line.

== Economy ==
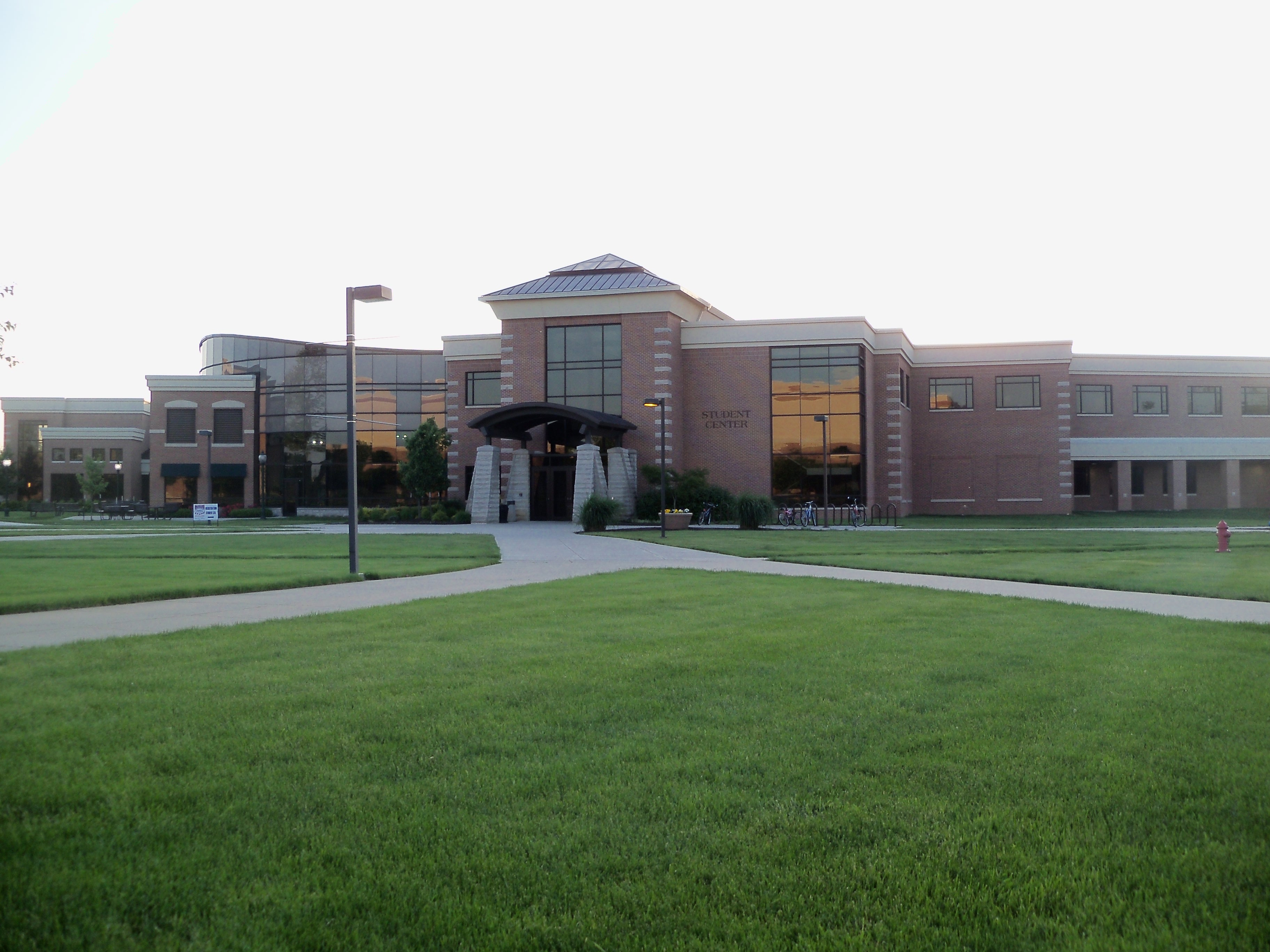
Indiana Wesleyan University campus

Marion's manufacturing sector produces automotive components, paper products, foundry products, machinery, wire, and cable. The paper plate industry was born in Marion; in its infancy, five of the nation's nine plants were located in the city.

The area surrounding Marion is part of the Corn Belt; as such, agriculture remains a significant component of the region's economy. Corn, soybean, and hog production are supplemented by specialty crops such as tomatoes.

Thomson SA's Marion facility was shuttered in 2004 leaving the city in an economic slump. On June 13, 2007, the Thomson building's northern portion was destroyed by a fire. Other Marion plant closures in the past few decades include those of Ball-Foster, SCM (later Ampad) Paper Company, and the Malleable Iron Works (both on the far west side along Miller Avenue). The city has made inroads in attracting new businesses in the mid to late 2000s, however. Marion has been the only Midwest community selected as one of the Top 100 Micro-Enterprises for Economic Development by Site Selection Magazine for the years 2007 and 2008. TriEnda Plastics LLC selection of Marion in 2008 was one of the top 5 Manufacturing Projects in Indiana and received the coveted Silver Shovel award from Area Development Magazine. By spring 2011, TriEnda has ceased production. In the last ten years over $1,113,000 has been invested by private sector employers in Marion.

== Arts and culture ==
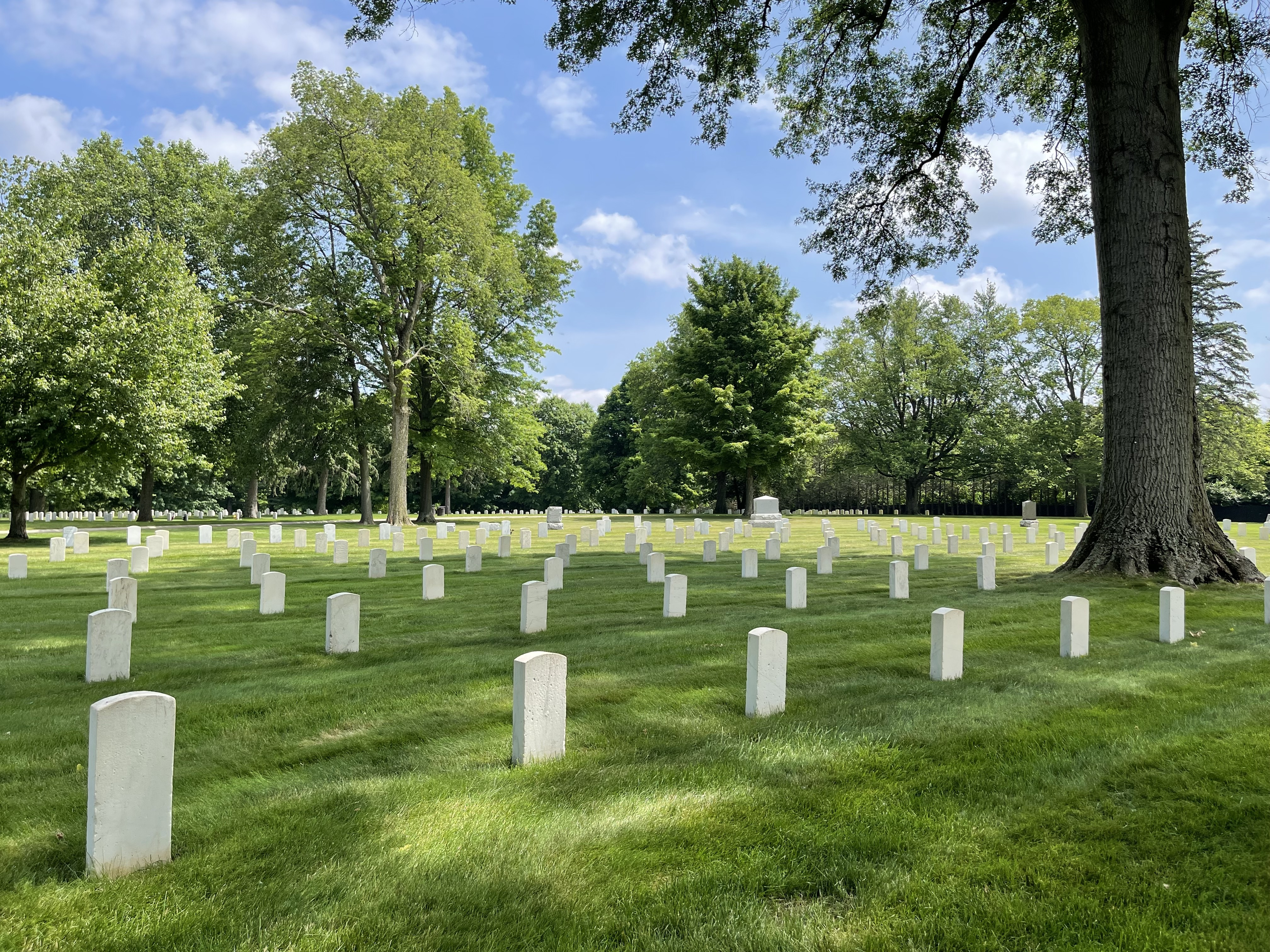
Marion National Cemetery is included within the National Home for Disabled Volunteer Soldiers, Marion Branch historic district

The Grant County Jail and Sheriff's Residence, Abijah C. Jay House, Marion Branch, National Home for Disabled Volunteer Soldiers Historic District, Marion Downtown Commercial Historic District, Aaron Swayzee House, George, Jr. and Marie Daugherty Webster House, and J. Woodrow Wilson House are listed on the National Register of Historic Places.

From 1900 to 1901, Marion had their own baseball team called the Glass Blowers.

=== Christmas City U.S.A. ===
Christmas City U.S.A. is a local non-profit organization promoting the Christmas season in Marion and Grant County. It organizes and sponsors the Annual Christmas Parade on the Saturday before Thanksgiving to kick off the Holiday season.

It began in 1965 when the organization had a vision to expand the holiday season beyond the traditional cards and private parties. Directors wanted to foster human relations among residents of all ages and public relations toward nonresidents. In 1970, Christmas City and the Chamber of Commerce joined forces to promote a new look for the city. Postcards, bumper stickers, billboards were designed to establish the city as Christmas City U.S.A. The name was even trademarked to preserve the city's identity. In 1991, Mayor Ron Mowery, Mark Erlewine, and a group of interested citizens decided to make Marion live up to its name. By combining the Mississinewa Riverwalk—the 2.25 miles (3.62 km) walkway which is used year around for jogging, walking and more—and holiday lights and lighted displays, the Christmas City Walkway of Lights was established in 1992. The first year, the walkway was home to nearly 56,000 lights and lighted displays; the walkway has grown to include more than 2,000,000 lights and is nearly 4 miles (6.4 km) long.

== Government ==
The city government consists of a mayor and a city council. The mayor is elected in citywide vote. The city council consists of 9 members with 6 wards and 3 at large. The current members of city council are:

- At Large: Nick McKinley (President)
- At Large: Brian Cowgill (Vice President)
- At Large: Jim Brunner
- District 1: Gary Fordyce, Sr.
- District 2: Mike Cline
- District 3: Erika Devine
- District 4: Eric A. Marshall
- District 5: Andy Whitton
- District 6: David Cain

== Education ==
The majority of the city limits is in the Marion Community Schools school district. The comprehensive high school of that district is Marion High School.

Some areas in the city limits are in the Eastbrook Community School Corporation, Mississinewa Community School Corporation, and Oak Hill United School Corporation. The former two districts have area in Marion zoned for residential purposes.

== Transportation ==
The Marion Municipal Airport is three nautical miles (4 mi, 6 km) southwest of Marion's central business district.

Marion Transit System provides fixed-route and demand-response bus services in the city.

== Notable people ==
- Jolly Blackburn, cartoonist, writer, creator of Knights of the Dinner Table
- Case Broderick, politician
- Chad Curtis, professional baseball player
- Jim Davis, creator of Garfield, the lasagna-loving comic strip cat; (Davis's studio, Paws, Inc., is located near Muncie, Indiana)
- James Dean, iconic actor, born in Marion
- Willis Van Devanter, Supreme Court Justice
- Mildred Dilling, harpist
- Jim Gallagher, Jr., professional golfer, golf analyst for USA Network
- Samuel Levi Jones (born 1978), painter, assemblage artist
- Jeff King, professional baseball player, Pittsburgh Pirates and Kansas City Royals
- Kenesaw Mountain Landis, first Commissioner of Baseball, practiced law in Marion
- Mike Melvill, the first commercial astronaut
- Keith O'Conner Murphy, Sweetser, IN, Rockabilly Hall of Fame, singer-songwriter, Stacy and King Records (USA) Polydor Records, England
- Stretch Murphy, Hall of Fame basketball player
- William N. Oatis, Associated Press correspondent detained 1951–1953 by Communist government of Czechoslovakia
- Joseph Price, professional basketball player, NBA Washington Bullets. NCAA head basketball coach at Grambling State University
- Zach Randolph, professional basketball player, Memphis Grizzlies
- Amber Richards, transgender female impersonator, television personality, and winner of the Miss Continental pageant.
- Wayne Seybold, Marion mayor and pairs skater at 1988 Winter Olympics
- Caleb Blood Smith, Secretary of the Interior under President Abraham Lincoln and served as a prosecuting attorney in Marion
- George Washington Steele, Indiana Congressman and first governor of the Oklahoma Territory
- Supernatural (rapper) born in Marion (moved to NY at 19)
- Monte Towe, North Carolina State Wolfpack National Champions 1974, Chicago Bulls, NCAA coach
- Jan Wiley, actress

== See also ==
- National Home For Disabled Volunteer Soldiers, Marion Branch
- List of places named for Francis Marion
