= Fairmount Township, Grant County, Indiana =

Fairmount Township
- Township
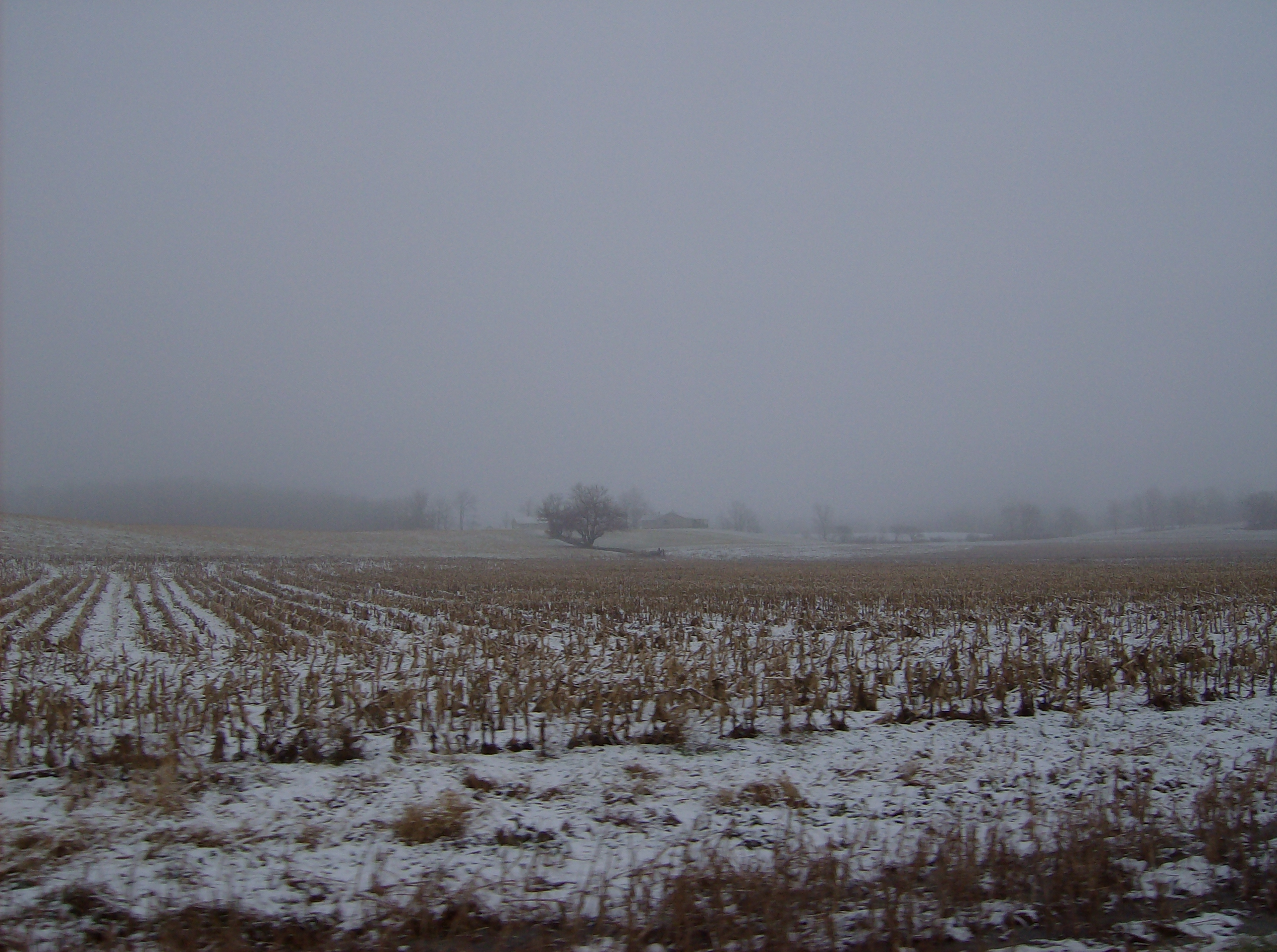
- Snowy fields in Fairmount Township

- Location of Fairmount Township in Grant County
- Coordinates: 40°25′N 85°37′W
- Country: United States
- State: Indiana
- County: Grant

Government
  - Type: Indiana township

Area
  - Total: 30.47 sq mi (78.9 km^{2})
  - Land: 30.43 sq mi (78.8 km^{2})
  - Water: 0.03 sq mi (0.078 km^{2}) 0.10%
- Elevation: 873 ft (266 m)

Population (2020)
  - Total: 3,986
  - Density: 139.3/sq mi (53.8/km^{2})
- GNIS feature ID: 0453287

Fairmount Township is one of thirteen townships in Grant County, Indiana, United States. As of the 2010 census, its population was 4,239 and it contained 1,909 housing units.

== Geography ==
According to the 2010 census, the township has a total area of 30.47 square miles (78.9 km^{2}), of which 30.43 square miles (78.8 km^{2}) (or 99.87%) is land and 0.03 square miles (0.078 km^{2}) (or 0.10%) is water. The streams of Back Creek, Winslow Ditch, Barren Creek, Fowlerton Drain, New Prairie Creek and Van Run run through this township. Lake Galatia, the southernmost natural lake in Indiana, lies in this township.

=== Cities and towns ===
- Fairmount
- Fowlerton

=== Adjacent townships ===
- Mill Township (north)
- Jefferson Township (east)
- Washington Township, Delaware County (southeast)
- Van Buren Township, Madison County (south)
- Boone Township, Madison County (southwest)
- Liberty Township (west)

=== Cemeteries ===
The township contains two cemeteries: Bethel and Park.

=== Major highways ===
- SR 9
- SR 26

== Education ==
The township is in Madison-Grant United School Corporation. The district's comprehensive high school is Madison-Grant High School.

Fairmount Township residents may obtain a free library card from the Fairmount Public Library in Fairmount.
