= Rigdon, Indiana =

- Unincorporated community
- Location within Indiana Location within the United States
- Coordinates: 40°22′44″N 85°47′11″W
- Country: United States
- State: Indiana
- Counties: Grant, Madison
- Townships: Green, Liberty, Duck Creek, Boone
- Elevation: 896 ft (273 m)
- ZIP code: 46036
- FIPS code: 18-64476
- GNIS feature ID: 442008

Rigdon is an unincorporated community in Grant and Madison counties, Indiana, United States.

== History ==
Rigdon was named for Dr. Pryor Rigdon, a local resident. The community had a post office between 1855 and 1912.

== Geography ==
Rigdon is located on the Grant and Madison County line. It sits at the quadripoint of four townships: Green and Liberty townships in Grant County, comprising the northern half of the community, and Duck Creek and Boone townships in Madison County, covering the southern half of the community.

== Notable people ==
- Willard Gemmill, justice of the Indiana Supreme Court
