= Green Township, Grant County, Indiana =

Green Township
- Township
- Location of Green Township in Grant County
- Coordinates: 40°25′23″N 85°49′30″W
- Country: United States
- State: Indiana
- County: Grant

Government
  - Type: Indiana township

Area
  - Total: 27.74 sq mi (71.8 km^{2})
  - Land: 27.74 sq mi (71.8 km^{2})
  - Water: 0 sq mi (0 km^{2}) 0%
- Elevation: 873 ft (266 m)

Population (2020)
  - Total: 426
  - Density: 18/sq mi (6.9/km^{2})
- GNIS feature ID: 0453340

Green Township is one of 13 townships in Grant County, Indiana, United States. As of the 2010 census, its population was 500 and it contained 225 housing units.

== Geography ==
According to the 2010 census, the township has a total area of 27.74 square miles (71.8 km^{2}), all land.

=== Unincorporated towns ===
- Normal
- Point Isabel
- Rigdon

(This list is based on USGS data and may include former settlements.)

=== Adjacent townships ===
- Sims Township (north)
- Franklin Township (northeast)
- Liberty Township (east)
- Boone Township, Madison County (southeast)
- Duck Creek Township, Madison County (south)
- Wildcat Township, Tipton County (southwest)
- Union Township, Howard County (west)
- Jackson Township, Howard County (northwest)

=== Major highways ===
- US 35
- SR 13
- SR 26

=== Airports and landing strips ===
- Dupouy Airport

== Education ==
The township is in Madison-Grant United School Corporation. The district's comprehensive high school is Madison-Grant High School.
