= Liberty Township, Grant County, Indiana =

Liberty Township
- Township
- Location of Liberty Township in Grant County
- Coordinates: 40°25′46″N 85°43′34″W
- Country: United States
- State: Indiana
- County: Grant

Government
  - Type: Indiana township

Area
  - Total: 42.19 sq mi (109.3 km^{2})
  - Land: 42.19 sq mi (109.3 km^{2})
  - Water: 0.01 sq mi (0.026 km^{2}) 0.02%
- Elevation: 873 ft (266 m)

Population (2020)
  - Total: 898
  - Density: 24.4/sq mi (9.4/km^{2})
- GNIS feature ID: 0453554

Liberty Township is one of thirteen townships in Grant County, Indiana, United States. As of the 2010 census, its population was 1,028 and it contained 428 housing units.

== Geography ==
According to the 2010 census, the township has a total area of 42.19 square miles (109.3 km^{2}), of which 42.19 square miles (109.3 km^{2}) (or 100%) is land and 0.01 square miles (0.026 km^{2}) (or 0.02%) is water. The streams of Little Creek and Little Deer Creek run through this township.

=== Cities and towns ===
- Marion (southwest edge)

=== Unincorporated towns ===
- Hackleman
- Radley
- Weaver

(This list is based on USGS data and may include former settlements.)

=== Adjacent townships ===
- Franklin Township (north)
- Mill Township (northeast)
- Fairmount Township (east)
- Boone Township, Madison County (south)
- Duck Creek Township, Madison County (southwest)
- Green Township (west)
- Sims Township (northwest)

=== Major highways ===
- US 35
- SR 9
- SR 26
- SR 37

== Education ==
The township is in Madison-Grant United School Corporation. The district's comprehensive high school is Madison-Grant High School.
