= Wheeling, Indiana =

Wheeling is the name of the following places in the U.S. state of Indiana:

- Wheeling, Carroll County, Indiana
- Wheeling, Delaware County, Indiana
- Wheeling, Gibson County, Indiana
