= Wildcat Township, Tipton County, Indiana =

Wildcat Township
- Township
- Location in Tipton County
- Coordinates: 40°22′17″N 85°55′34″W
- Country: United States
- State: Indiana
- County: Tipton

Government
  - Type: Indiana township

Area
  - Total: 34.82 sq mi (90.2 km^{2})
  - Land: 34.8 sq mi (90 km^{2})
  - Water: 0.02 sq mi (0.052 km^{2}) 0.06%
- Elevation: 863 ft (263 m)

Population (2020)
  - Total: 1,260
  - Density: 36.2/sq mi (14.0/km^{2})
- Time zone: UTC-5 (Eastern (EST))
  - Summer (DST): UTC-4 (EDT)
- ZIP codes: 46036, 46072, 46076
- Area code: 765
- GNIS feature ID: 454059

Wildcat Township is one of six townships in Tipton County, Indiana, United States. As of the 2020 census, its population was 1,260 (down from 1,421 at 2010) and it contained 589 housing units.

== History ==
It was originally part of the Miami Indian reservation until 1847, when the land was available for purchase by white settlers. However, the area had begun to be settled by white squatters as early as 1845. Early farmers traveled to Lafayette to sell farm animals like hogs. Wheat was sold in Peru and settlers traveled as far as Perkinsville to have access to a mill. The earliest religious congregation in the township, a Baptist denomination, was founded in the mid-nineteenth century.

== Geography ==
According to the 2010 census, the township has a total area of 34.82 square miles (90.2 km^{2}), of which 34.8 square miles (90 km^{2}) (or 99.94%) is land and 0.02 square miles (0.052 km^{2}) (or 0.06%) is water.

=== Natural environment ===
Historically, Wildcat Township is very flat. Prior to extensive white settlement, the area had forests with spicebush, dogwood, willow, elm, poplar, beech, sugar tree, ash, and linn. By the early 1900s, the majority of timber had been cut down. The soil is made of "deep, black vegetable mold," that sits on top of "impervious clay sub-soil" and is good for agriculture.

=== Cities, towns, villages ===
- Windfall

=== Adjacent townships ===
- Union Township, Howard County (north)
- Green Township, Grant County (northeast)
- Duck Creek Township, Madison County (east)
- Madison Township (south)
- Cicero Township (southwest)
- Liberty Township (west)
- Taylor Township, Howard County (northwest)

== Governance ==
=== Political districts ===
- Indiana's 5th congressional district
- State House District 32
- State Senate District 20

== Education ==
=== Early history ===
The first school in the township was built near Mud Creek in 1848. David Decker was the first teacher. After three years the school was abandoned. A second school was built in Windfall. A former settlement, called Pierce, was the site of the first frame school. Public schools became available in the community after 1855.

=== Today ===
Students in Wildcat Township attend Tri-Central Community Schools.

== Infrastructure ==
=== Transportation ===
==== Roads and highways ====
The first road in the township was surveyed in 1849. It traveled southwest through the township towards Tipton. In 1851, a second road was built in the northern part of the township, traveling east to west. By 1855 the township had an extensive roadway system for the time period.

==== Airports and landing strips ====
- the former Zea Mays Airport

=== Cemeteries ===
The township contains these three cemeteries: Brookside, Salem and Wheeler.
