= Washington Township, Delaware County, Indiana =

Washington Township
- Township
- Location of Washington Township in Delaware County
- Coordinates: 40°20′59″N 85°31′00″W
- Country: United States
- State: Indiana
- County: Delaware

Government
  - Type: Indiana township

Area
  - Total: 35.49 sq mi (91.9 km^{2})
  - Land: 35.34 sq mi (91.5 km^{2})
  - Water: 0.15 sq mi (0.39 km^{2})
- Elevation: 869 ft (265 m)

Population (2020)
  - Total: 1,849
  - Density: 52.1/sq mi (20.1/km^{2})
- FIPS code: 18-80576
- GNIS feature ID: 453993

Washington Township is one of twelve townships in Delaware County, Indiana. According to the 2020 census, its population was 1,849 and it contained 889 housing units.

== Geography ==
According to the 2010 census, the township has a total area of 35.49 square miles (91.9 km^{2}), of which 35.34 square miles (91.5 km^{2}) (or 99.58%) is land and 0.15 square miles (0.39 km^{2}) (or 0.42%) is water. Jackson Lake is in this township.

=== Cities and towns ===
- Gaston

=== Unincorporated towns ===
- Stockport
- Wheeling

=== Adjacent townships ===
- Jefferson Township, Grant County (north)
- Licking Township, Blackford County (northeast)
- Union Township (east)
- Hamilton Township (southeast)
- Harrison Township (south)
- Monroe Township, Madison County (southwest)
- Van Buren Township, Madison County (west)
- Fairmount Township, Grant County (northwest)

=== Major highways ===
- Interstate 69

=== Cemeteries ===
The township contains five cemeteries: Elizabethtown, Olive Branch, Thompson, Wheeling and Zion Chapel.

== Demographics ==
Historical population
Census	Pop.	Note	%±
1890	1,863		—
1900	2,005		7.6%
1910	1,931		−3.7%
1920	1,608		−16.7%
1930	1,686		4.9%
1940	1,683		−0.2%
1950	1,747		3.8%
1960	1,921		10.0%
1970	2,218		15.5%
1980	2,468		11.3%
1990	2,201		−10.8%
2000	2,166		−1.6%
2010	2,027		−6.4%
2020	1,849		−8.8%
U.S. Decennial Census

=== 2020 census ===
As of the census of 2020, there were 1,849 people, 811 households, and 341 families living in the township. The population density was 52.10 inhabitants per square mile (20.1/km^{2}). There were 889 housing units at an average density of 25.05 inhabitants per square mile (9.7/km^{2}). The racial makeup of the township was 95.78% White, 1.6% African American, 1.1% Asian, 3.8% from other races, and 3.35% from two or more races. Hispanic and Latino of any race were 1.9% of the population.

There were 811 households, of which 22.5% had children under 18 living with them, 42.05% were married couples living together, 4.93% had a female householder with no husband present, and 2.59% had a male householder with no wife present, and 50.43% were non-families. The average household size was 2.28 and the average family size was 2.69.

The median age in the township was 45.2. 3.8% of residents were under the age of 5; 22.5% of residents were under the age of 18; 77.5% were age 18 or older; and 17.7% were age 65 or older. 7.0% of the population were veterans.

The most common language spoken at home was English with 98.7% speaking it at home, 0.9% spoke Spanish at home and 0.4% spoke an Asian or Pacific Islander language at home. 0.8% of the population were foreign born.

The median household income in Washington Township was $39,821, 29.1% less than the median average for the state of Indiana. 10.8% of the population were in poverty, including 14.6% of residents under the age of 18. The poverty level for the township was 2.1% lower than that of the state. 22.9% of the population were disabled and 11.6% had no healthcare coverage. 32.2% of the population had attained a high school or equivalent degree, 31.4% had attended college but received no degree, 8.7% had attained an associate's degree or higher, 6.6% had attained a bachelor's degree or higher, and 4.7% had a graduate or professional degree. 23.0% had no degree. 60.2% of Washington Township residents were employed, working a mean of 40.3 hours per week. The median gross rent in Gaston was $772 and the homeownership rate was 76.0%. 78 housing units were vacant at a density of 2.2 per square mile (0.8/km^{2}).
