= Stockport (disambiguation) =

Stockport is a large town in Greater Manchester, England.

Stockport may also refer to:

== Stockport, United Kingdom ==
=== Districts ===
Current

- Metropolitan Borough of Stockport
  - Stockport Metropolitan Borough Council
- Stockport (UK Parliament constituency)

Previous

- County Borough of Stockport (1889–1974)
- Stockport Rural District (1894–1904)
- Stockport North (UK Parliament constituency) (1950–1983)
- Stockport South (UK Parliament constituency) (1950–1983)

=== Sports ===
- Stockport County F.C., Association Football Club
- Stockport Cricket Club
- Stockport Georgians A.F.C.
- Stockport R.U.F.C

=== Buildings and structures ===
- Stockport Armoury
- Stockport Branch Canal
- Stockport Castle
- Stockport Central Library
- Stockport College
- Stockport Grammar School
- Stockport Interchange
- Stockport Peel Centre, a shopping centre
- Stockport railway station
- Stockport Town Hall
- Stockport Viaduct
- Stockport War Memorial Art Gallery

=== Other uses ===
- The Stockport air disaster
- Stockport Express, the local newspaper
- "Stockport", a 1983 traditional pop song by Frankie Vaughan

== Other places ==
In Australia

- Stockport, South Australia

In Canada

- Stockport Islands, Nunavut

In the United States

- Stockport, Indiana
- Stockport, Iowa
- Stockport, New York
- Stockport Creek, in New York
- Stockport, Ohio
