= Fowlerton =

Fowlerton can refer to a place in the United States:

- Fowlerton, Indiana
- Fowlerton, Texas
