= Jefferson Township, Grant County, Indiana =

Jefferson Township
- Township
- Location of Jefferson Township in Grant County
- Coordinates: 40°25′54″N 85°30′13″W
- Country: United States
- State: Indiana
- County: Grant

Government
  - Type: Indiana township

Area
  - Total: 41.9 sq mi (109 km^{2})
  - Land: 41.76 sq mi (108.2 km^{2})
  - Water: 0.14 sq mi (0.36 km^{2}) 0.33%
- Elevation: 899 ft (274 m)

Population (2020)
  - Total: 5,682
  - Density: 139.8/sq mi (54.0/km^{2})
- GNIS feature ID: 0453484

Jefferson Township is one of thirteen townships in Grant County, Indiana, United States. As of the 2010 census, its population was 5,839 and it contained 1,758 housing units.

== History ==
The Cumberland Covered Bridge was listed on the National Register of Historic Places in 1978.

== Geography ==
According to the 2010 census, the township has a total area of 41.9 square miles (109 km^{2}), of which 41.76 square miles (108.2 km^{2}) (or 99.67%) is land and 0.14 square miles (0.36 km^{2}) (or 0.33%) is water. Lakes in this township include Dollar Lake. The streams of Branch Creek, Cane Run, Crawford Creek, Lake Branch, Mat Run, Round Run and Upland Drain run through this township.

=== Cities and towns ===
- Gas City (east edge)
- Upland
- Matthews

=== Adjacent townships ===
- Monroe Township (north)
- Washington Township, Blackford County (northeast)
- Licking Township, Blackford County (east)
- Washington Township, Delaware County (south)
- Fairmount Township (west)
- Mill Township (northwest)

=== Cemeteries ===
The township contains two cemeteries, Shiloh and Jefferson.

=== Major highways ===
- I-69
- US 35
- SR 5
- SR 22
- SR 26

== Education ==
Jefferson Township residents may obtain a free library card from the Barton Rees Pogue Memorial Public Library in Upland.
