= Madison-Grant United School Corporation =

School district in Indiana, United States

Address
- 11580 SE 00 W Fairmount, Indiana, 46928; United States
- Coordinates: 40°23′03″N 85°40′25″W

District information
- Grades: PK-12
- Superintendent: Scott Deetz
- Schools: 3

Students and staff
- Enrollment: 1,073 (2020-21)
- Teachers: 74.12 (on an FTE basis)
- Student–teacher ratio: 14.48

Other information
- Website: www.mgusc.k12.in.us

Madison-Grant United School Corporation (MGUSC) is a school district headquartered in unincorporated Grant County, Indiana, near Fairmount. The district serves sections of Grant and Madison counties.

== Boundary ==
In Grant County it includes the following townships: Fairmount, Green, and Liberty. Municipalities include Fairmount and Fowlerton, and the district also covers Point Isabel census-designated place.

In Madison County it includes the following townships: Boone, Van Buren, and most of Duck Creek. The municipality of Summitville is within this school district.

== Schools ==
- Madison-Grant High School (unincorporated Grant County)
- Madison-Grant Junior High (unincorporated Grant County)
- Park Elementary School (Fairmount)
- Summitville Elementary School (Summitville)
