= Point Isabel, Indiana =

- Census-designated place
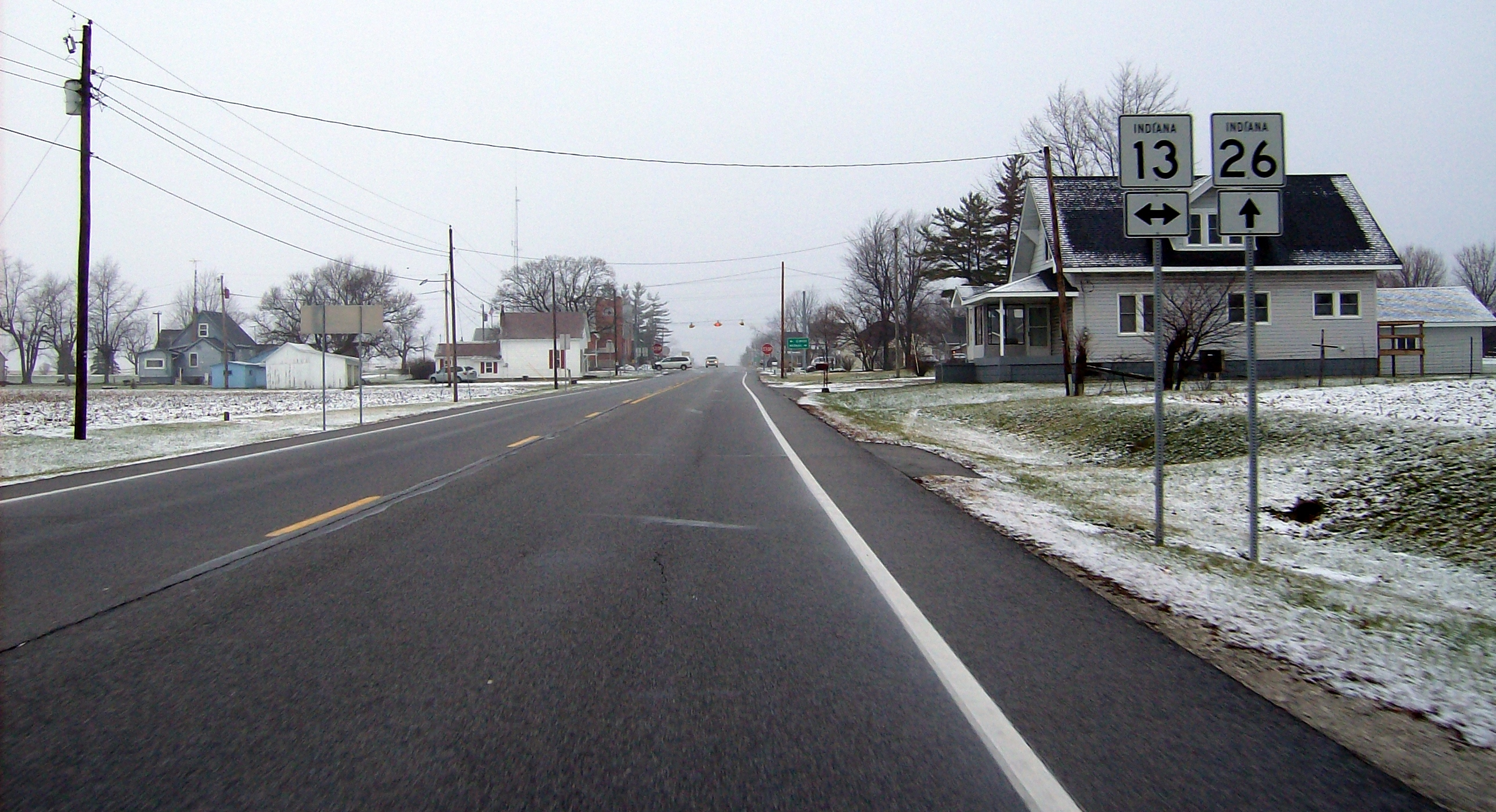
- Along State Road 26 in Point Isabel

- Location of Point Isabel in Grant County, Indiana.

- Location within Indiana Location within the United States
- Coordinates: 40°25′19″N 85°49′22″W
- Country: United States
- State: Indiana
- County: Grant
- Township: Green

Area
  - Total: 0.57 sq mi (1.48 km^{2})
  - Land: 0.57 sq mi (1.48 km^{2})
  - Water: 0 sq mi (0.00 km^{2})
- Elevation: 876 ft (267 m)

Population (2020)
  - Total: 114
  - Density: 200.0/sq mi (77.21/km^{2})
- ZIP code: 46928
- FIPS code: 18-60894
- GNIS feature ID: 2583464

Point Isabel is an unincorporated community and census-designated place (CDP) in central Green Township, Grant County, Indiana, United States. It lies at the intersection of State Roads 13 and 26. As of the 2020 census, Point Isabel had a population of 114.

A post office was established at Point Isabel in 1859, and remained in operation until it was discontinued in 1911.

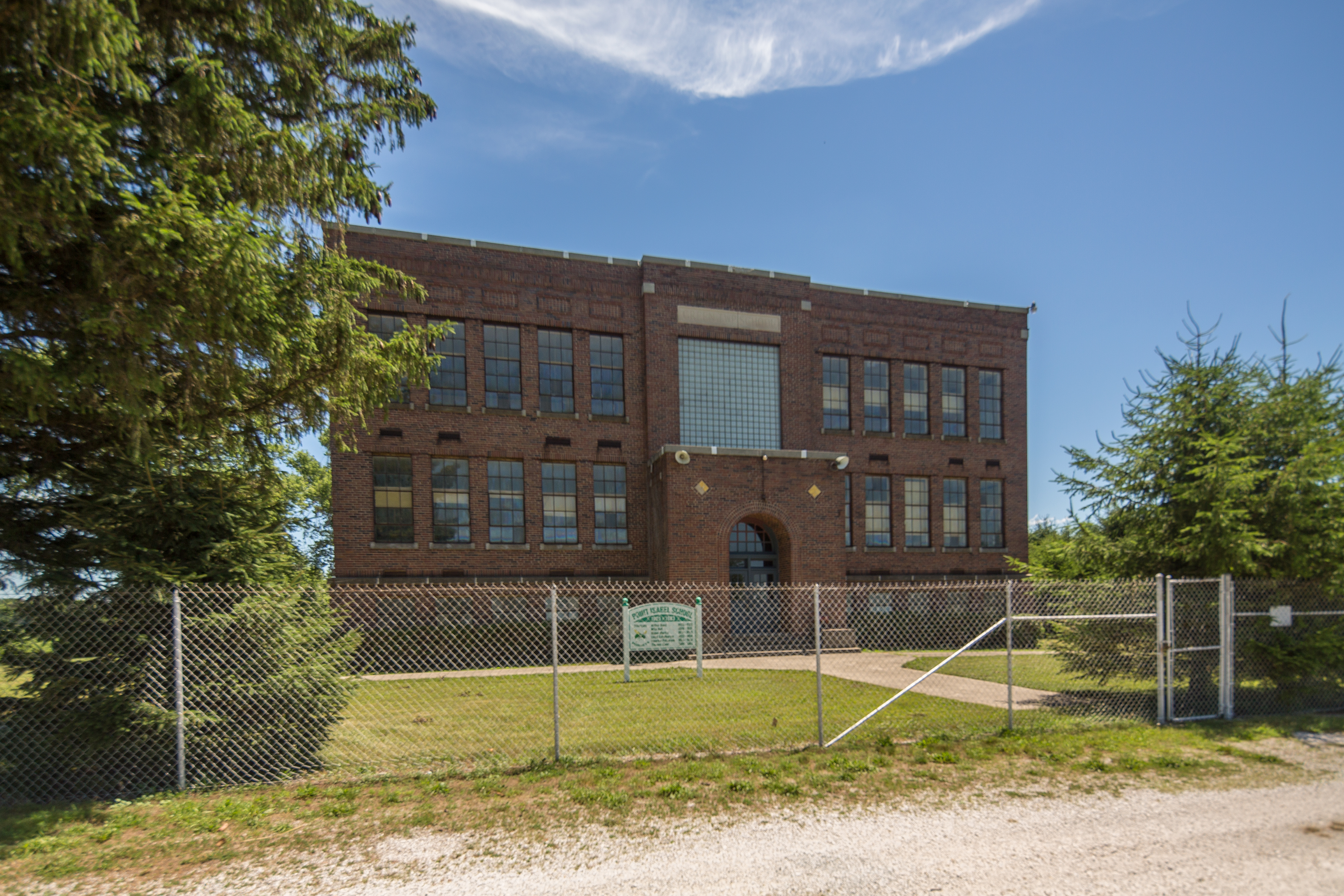
Photo from Small Town Indiana photo survey.

== Geography ==
Point Isabel is located in southwestern Grant County. State Road 13 leads north 6 miles (10 km) to Swayzee and south 10 miles (16 km) to Elwood, while State Road 26 leads east 9 miles (14 km) to Fairmount and west 16 miles (26 km) to the southern outskirts of Kokomo. Marion, the Grant County seat, is 15 miles (24 km) to the northeast via State Roads 26 and 37.

== Demographics ==
Historical population
Census	Pop.	Note	%±
2020	114		—
U.S. Decennial Census

== Education ==
Residents are in the Madison-Grant United School Corporation. Madison-Grant High School is the zoned high school.
