= Pleasant A. Hackleman =

American general

Pleasant Adams Hackleman
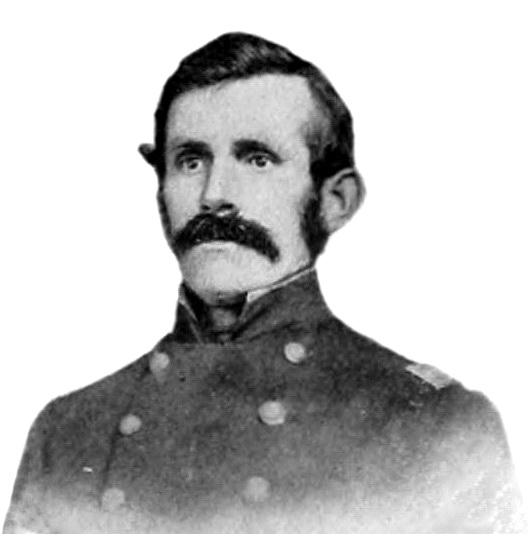
- Pleasant A. Hackleman
- Born: November 15, 1814; Franklin County, Indiana
- Died: October 3, 1862 (aged 47); Corinth, Mississippi
- Burial place: East Hill Cemetery, Rushville, Indiana
- Military career
- Allegiance: United States of America; Union
- Branch: United States Army; Union Army
- Service years: 1861–1862
- Rank: Brigadier General, U.S.V.
- Commands: 16th Indiana Volunteer Infantry
- Conflicts: American Civil War; Battle of Ball's Bluff; Second Battle of Corinth (DOW)
- Other work: Lawyer, Judge, Indiana Legislator

Pleasant Adams Hackleman (November 15, 1814 – October 3, 1862) was a lawyer, politician and Union general who was killed during the American Civil War.

Hackleman was born in Franklin County, in 1814. He married Sarah Bradburn in 1833 and began his life as a farmer. He studied law and eventually passed the bar and began practicing law. From 1837 to 1841 he served as probate judge of Rush County, Indiana. In 1840 he became editor of the Rushville Republican until the war. In 1841 he was elected to the Indiana State Legislature and served as a delegate to the National Republican Convention in Chicago which elected Abraham Lincoln as the Republican presidential candidate.

On May 20, 1861, when the Civil War began, Indiana Governor Oliver P. Morton appointed Hackleman colonel of the 16th Indiana Volunteer Infantry of one-year volunteers. Hackleman and the 16th Indiana were sent to the Eastern Theater where they were engaged at the Battle of Ball's Bluff. On April 28, 1862, he was promoted to brigadier general of volunteers and ordered to report to Ulysses S. Grant in the Western Theater. Hackleman was assigned to command the 1st Brigade in the 2nd Division of the Army of the Tennessee. The 2nd Division, led by Thomas A. Davies, was temporarily attached to William S. Rosecrans' Army of the Mississippi stationed around Corinth, Mississippi. On October 3, the Confederate Army attacked Rosecrans. Early in the fighting the Confederates forced a gap between Davies and General Thomas J. McKean's divisions and the Union line began to fall back. At this point in the battle Hackleman attempted to rally his brigade and was shot through the neck. He was taken to the Tishomingo Hotel in Corinth where he lay dying from the mortal wound. His final words were: "I am dying, but I die for my country". His body was returned to his home in Rushville where he was buried. He was the only Indiana general to be killed in battle during the Civil War.

Hackleman is the namesake of the rural community of Hackleman, Indiana.

== See also ==
- List of American Civil War generals (Union)

== Bibliography ==
- Eicher, John H., & Eicher, David J., Civil War High Commands, Stanford University Press, 2001, ISBN 0-8047-3641-3.
- Indiana Civil War Biographies
