= Upland, Indiana =

- Town
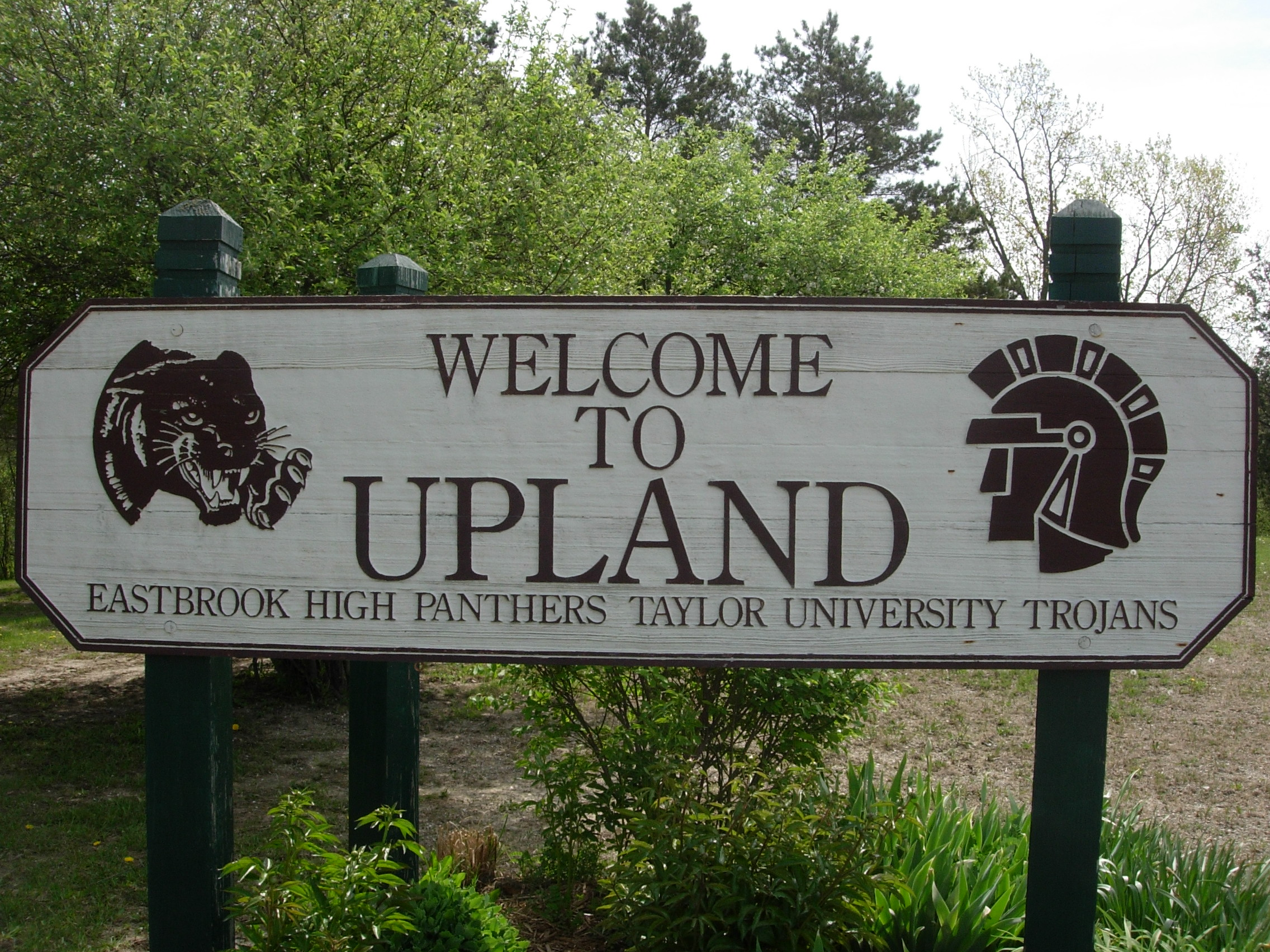

- Location of Upland in Grant County, Indiana.
- Coordinates: 40°27′53″N 85°29′50″W
- Country: United States
- State: Indiana
- County: Grant
- Township: Jefferson

Government
  - Town Manager: Jonathan Perez

Area
  - Total: 3.15 sq mi (8.16 km^{2})
  - Land: 3.14 sq mi (8.13 km^{2})
  - Water: 0.012 sq mi (0.03 km^{2})
- Elevation: 912 ft (278 m)

Population (2020)
  - Total: 3,821
  - Density: 1,217.6/sq mi (470.12/km^{2})
- Time zone: UTC-5 (Eastern (EST))
  - Summer (DST): UTC-4 (EDT)
- ZIP code: 46989
- Area code: 765
- FIPS code: 18-77966
- GNIS feature ID: 2397707
- Website: www.in.gov/towns/upland/

Upland (pronounced as "up-land") is a town in Jefferson Township, Grant County, Indiana, United States. The population was 3,821 at the 2020 census. It is the home of Taylor University, a Christian college.

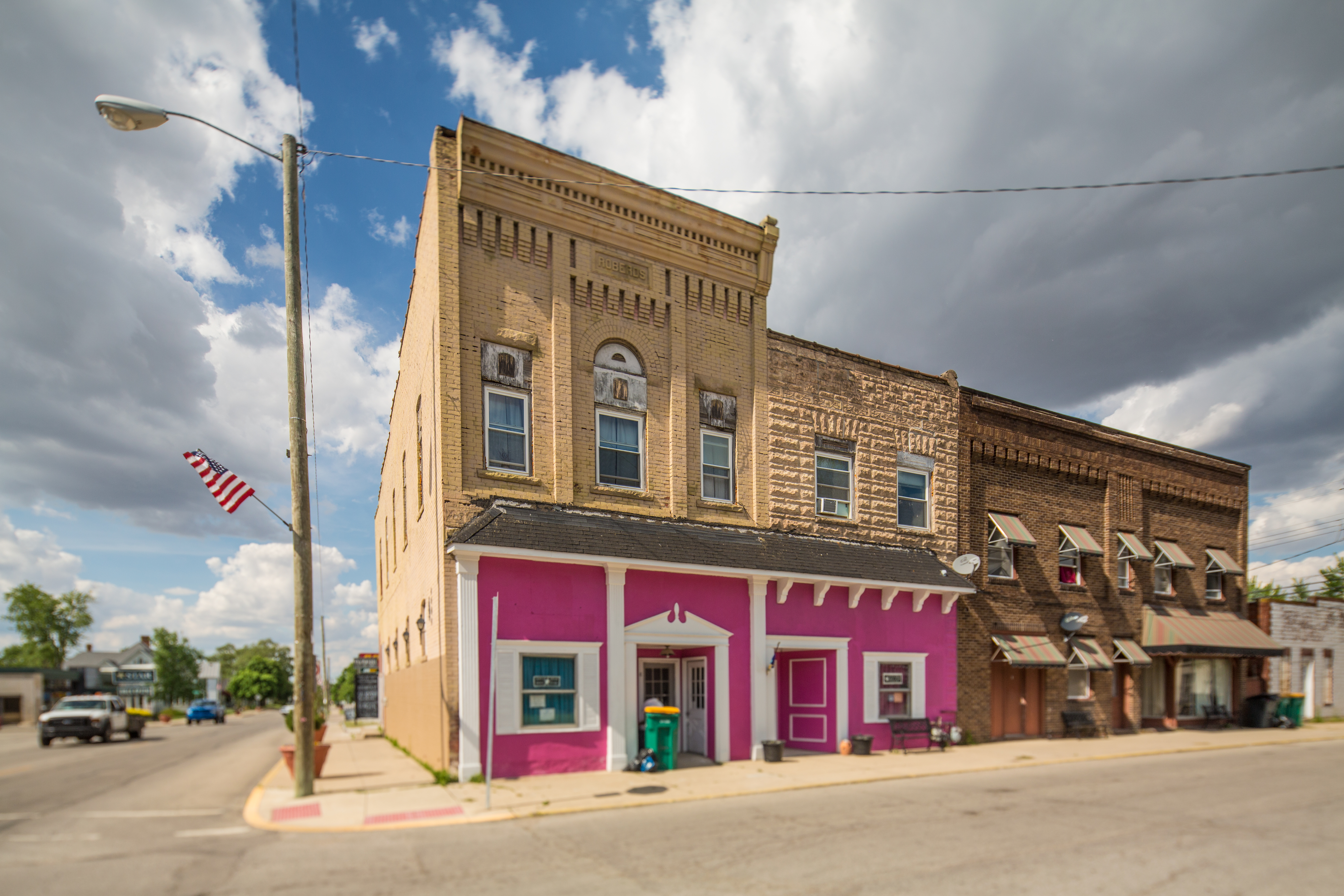
Upland, Indiana.

== History ==
Most of the land that is now part of Upland was purchased by John Oswalt in the 1830s. He was a speculator, and believed that a canal connecting Indianapolis and Fort Wayne might pass through the area. The town was formed in the late 1860s by Jacob Bugher, who planned for it to be a depot point on the Indiana Central Railroad. The town's name comes from the fact it was believed to be the highest point on the rail line between Columbus and Chicago. By 1880, the town had a population of around 150 and included a school, two churches, several stores, a blacksmith shop, and a sawmill.

Upland benefited from the gas boom in central Indiana which started in 1886 and carried on until around 1900 when the gas supply began to decline. Gas was discovered in Upland in 1888, and this new resource allowed the town to flourish and grow. By the 1890s, the town had a population of over 1,000, street lights, water and gas lines, and a glass manufacturing plant.

Taylor University moved to Upland in the summer of 1893. The school had been struggling financially in Fort Wayne, and the gas boom allowed the town to provide the university with $10,000 in cash and 10 acres (40,000 m^{2}) of land.

== Geography ==
Upland is between Fort Wayne (one hour north by car) and Indianapolis (1 1/4 hours south). It is about 30 minutes from Muncie where Ball State University is located. It is about 15 minutes from Marion and Indiana Wesleyan University.

According to the 2010 census, Upland has an area of 3.152 square miles (8.16 km^{2}), of which 3.14 square miles (8.13 km^{2}) (or 99.62%) is land and 0.012 square miles (0.03 km^{2}) (or 0.38%) is water.

== Demographics ==
Historical population
| Census | Pop. | Note | %± |
|---|---|---|---|
| 1880 | 176 | | — |
| 1900 | 1,208 | | — |
| 1910 | 1,080 | | −10.6% |
| 1920 | 1,301 | | 20.5% |
| 1930 | 906 | | −30.4% |
| 1940 | 900 | | −0.7% |
| 1950 | 1,565 | | 73.9% |
| 1960 | 1,999 | | 27.7% |
| 1970 | 3,202 | | 60.2% |
| 1980 | 3,335 | | 4.2% |
| 1990 | 3,295 | | −1.2% |
| 2000 | 3,803 | | 15.4% |
| 2010 | 3,845 | | 1.1% |
| 2020 | 3,821 | | −0.6% |
U.S. Decennial Census

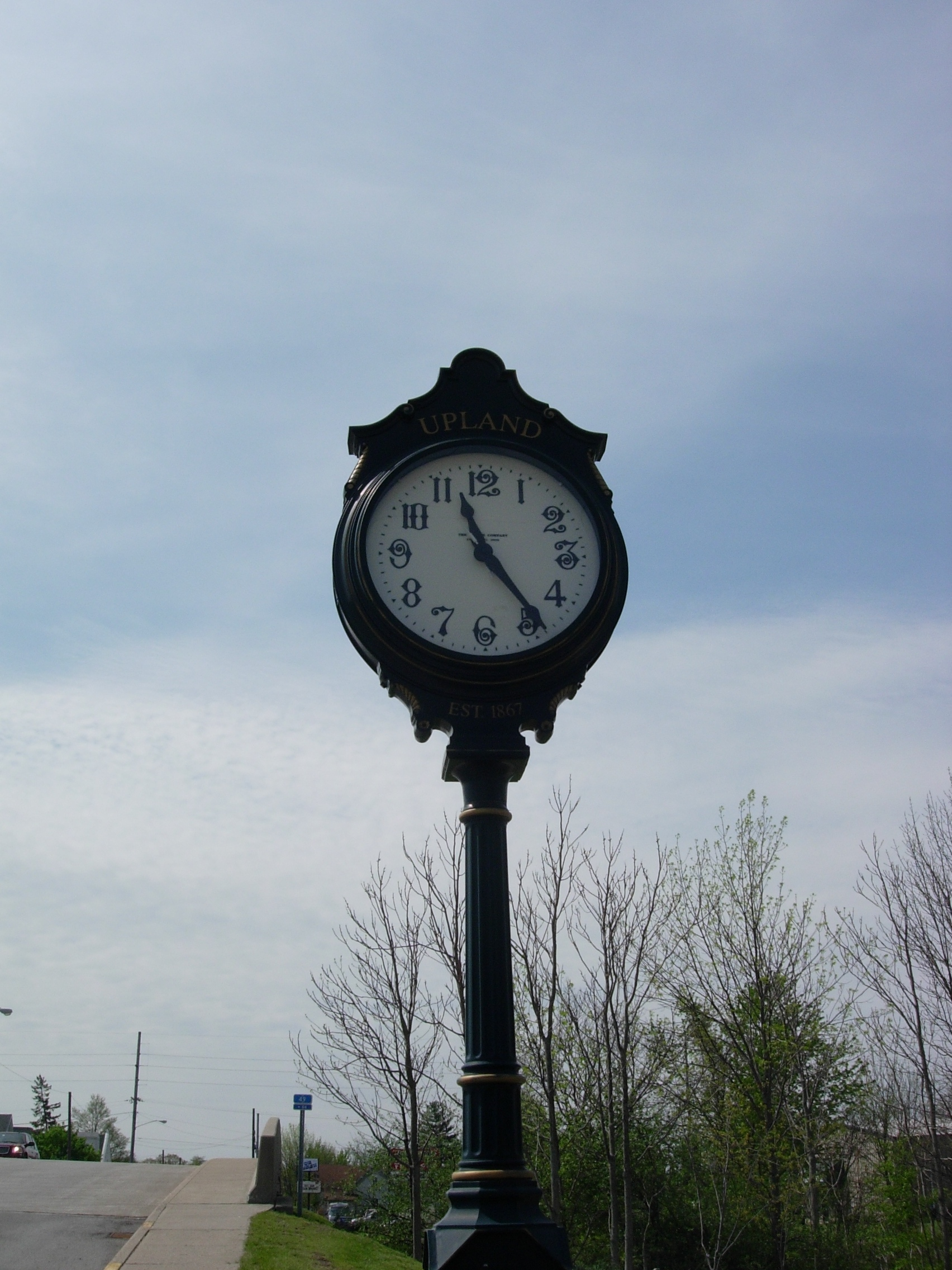
Upland clock

=== 2020 census ===
As of the 2020 census, Upland had a population of 3,821. The median age was 22.6 years. 13.6% of residents were under the age of 18 and 12.2% of residents were 65 years of age or older. For every 100 females there were 90.2 males, and for every 100 females age 18 and over there were 88.2 males age 18 and over.

0.0% of residents lived in urban areas, while 100.0% lived in rural areas.

There were 863 households in Upland, of which 30.0% had children under the age of 18 living in them. Of all households, 53.4% were married-couple households, 14.9% were households with a male householder and no spouse or partner present, and 26.1% were households with a female householder and no spouse or partner present. About 27.2% of all households were made up of individuals and 11.7% had someone living alone who was 65 years of age or older.

There were 961 housing units, of which 10.2% were vacant. The homeowner vacancy rate was 2.2% and the rental vacancy rate was 12.8%.

Racial composition as of the 2020 census
| Race | Number | Percent |
|---|---|---|
| White | 3,446 | 90.2% |
| Black or African American | 47 | 1.2% |
| American Indian and Alaska Native | 8 | 0.2% |
| Asian | 86 | 2.3% |
| Native Hawaiian and Other Pacific Islander | 1 | 0.0% |
| Some other race | 31 | 0.8% |
| Two or more races | 202 | 5.3% |
| Hispanic or Latino (of any race) | 124 | 3.2% |

=== 2010 census ===
As of the census of 2010, there were 3,845 people, 872 households, and 589 families living in the town. The population density was 1,224.5 inhabitants per square mile (472.8/km^{2}). There were 949 housing units at an average density of 302.2 per square mile (116.7/km^{2}). The racial makeup of the town was 94.6% White, 1.6% African American, 0.2% Native American, 1.2% Asian, 0.1% Pacific Islander, 0.9% from other races, and 1.5% from two or more races. Hispanic or Latino of any race were 2.3% of the population.

There were 872 households, of which 30.7% had children under the age of 18 living with them, 55.3% were married couples living together, 8.6% had a female householder with no husband present, 3.7% had a male householder with no wife present, and 32.5% were non-families. 23.7% of all households were made up of individuals, and 9.6% had someone living alone who was 65 years of age or older. The average household size was 2.60 and the average family size was 3.00.

The median age in the town was 21.8 years. 14.1% of residents were under the age of 18; 48.8% were between the ages of 18 and 24; 12.7% were from 25 to 44; 14.9% were from 45 to 64; and 9.5% were 65 years of age or older. The gender makeup of the town was 47.7% male and 52.3% female.

=== 2000 census ===
As of the census of 2000, there were 3,803 people, 789 households, and 569 families living in the town. The population density was 967.1 inhabitants per square mile (373.4/km^{2}). There were 824 housing units at an average density of 209.5 per square mile (80.9/km^{2}). The racial makeup of the town was 94.40% White, 1.53% African American, 0.68% Native American, 1.50% Asian, 0.13% Pacific Islander, 0.68% from other races, and 1.08% from two or more races. Hispanic or Latino of any race were 2.31% of the population.

There were 789 households, out of which 30.5% had children under the age of 18 living with them, 60.7% were married couples living together, 9.1% had a female householder with no husband present, and 27.8% were non-families. 20.8% of all households were made up of individuals, and 8.1% had someone living alone who was 65 years of age or older. The average household size was 2.64 and the average family size was 3.01.

In the town, the population was spread out, with 13.3% under the age of 18, 51.9% from 18 to 24, 13.9% from 25 to 44, 12.9% from 45 to 64, and 8.0% who were 65 years of age or older. The median age was 21 years. For every 100 females, there were 97.0 males. For every 100 females age 18 and over, there were 96.8 males.

The median income for a household in the town was $36,827, and the median income for a family was $44,712. Males had a median income of $32,019 versus $21,845 for females. The per capita income for the town was $11,761. About 7.4% of families and 14.5% of the population were below the poverty line, including 11.3% of those under age 18 and 6.9% of those age 65 or over.

== Education ==
The town has a lending library, the Barton Rees Pogue Memorial Public Library, and an elementary school, Eastbrook South. Upland is also the home of Taylor University.
