= Joseph & Lucinda Thawley House =

Historic house in Indiana, United States

- U.S. National Register of Historic Places
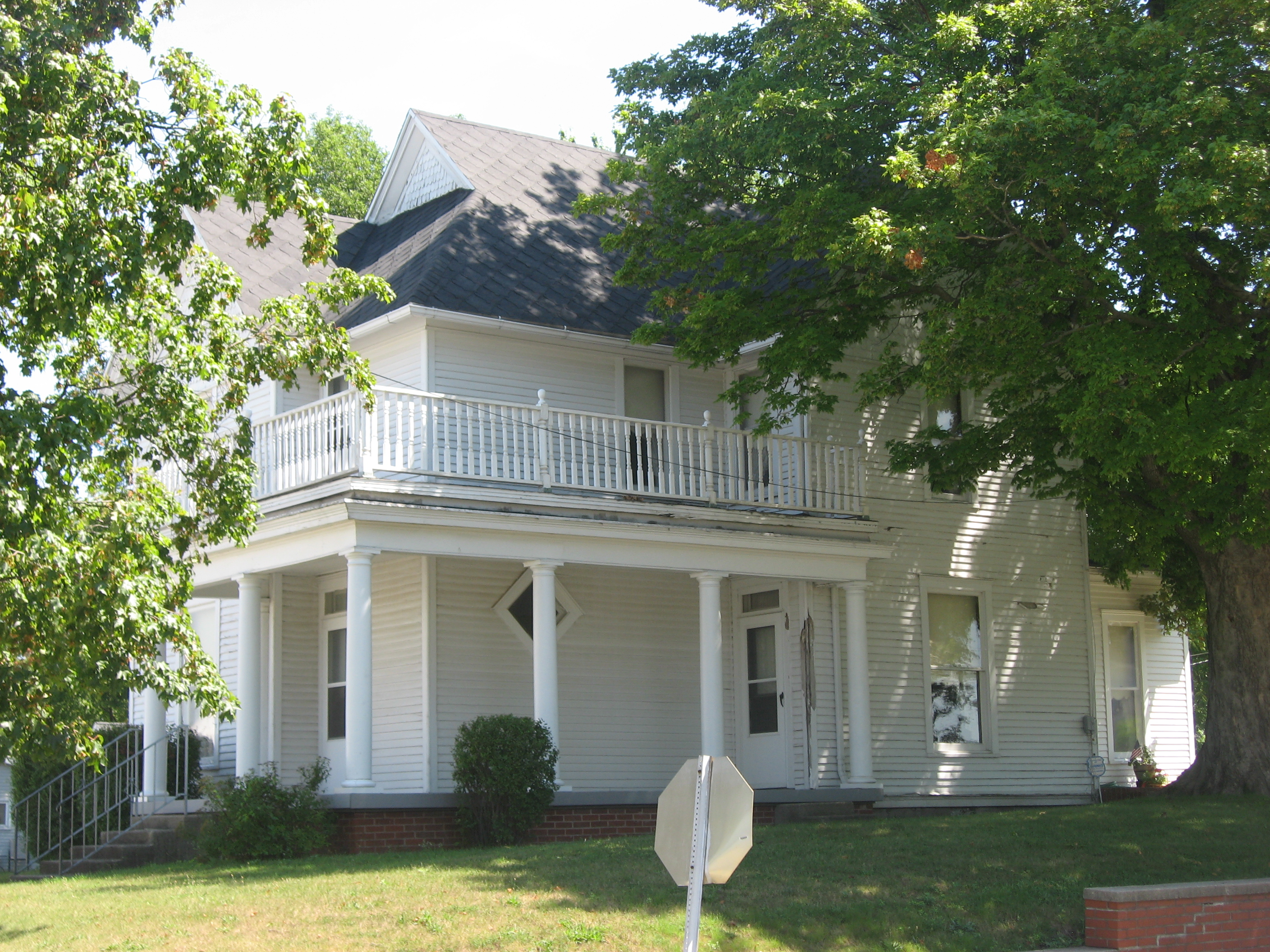
- Front and southern side

- Location within Indiana Location within the United States
- Location: 300 E. North Main St., Summitville, Indiana
- Coordinates: 40°20′24″N 85°38′35″W
- Area: less than one acre
- Built: 1894-1895
- Architect: Callin, A.C.
- Architectural style: Queen Anne, Free Classic
- NRHP reference No.: 09000760
- Added to NRHP: September 24, 2009

Joseph & Lucinda Thawley House is a historic home located at Summitville, Indiana, United States. It was built in 1894–1895, and is a 2 1/2-story, Queen Anne style frame dwelling. It has a steep and complex hipped and gable roofline, a 1 1/2-story service wing, and rests on an ashlar limestone foundation. The house features a wraparound porch.

It was listed in the National Register of Historic Places in 2009.
