= Leisure, Indiana =

- Unincorporated community
- Location within Indiana Location within the United States
- Coordinates: 40°21′51″N 85°50′35″W
- Country: United States
- State: Indiana
- County: Madison
- Township: Duck Creek
- Elevation: 873 ft (266 m)
- ZIP code: 46036
- FIPS code: 18-42786
- GNIS feature ID: 437764

Leisure (pronounced lay-zher (LāZHer)) is an unincorporated community in Duck Creek Township, Madison County, Indiana.

== History ==
A post office was established at Leisure in 1888, and remained in operation until it was discontinued in 1903. The community was named after Civil War veteran and pioneer Nathan J. Leisure.
