= Radley, Indiana =

- Unincorporated community
- Location within Indiana Location within the United States
- Coordinates: 40°26′11″N 85°44′01″W
- Country: United States
- State: Indiana
- County: Grant
- Township: Liberty
- Elevation: 883 ft (269 m)
- ZIP code: 46938
- FIPS code: 18-62676
- GNIS feature ID: 441725

Radley is an unincorporated community in Liberty Township, Grant County, Indiana.

== History ==
A post office was established at Radley in 1899, and remained in operation until it was discontinued in 1911. According to one source, Radley was named for the postmaster's father-in-law.
