= Matthews, Indiana =

- Town
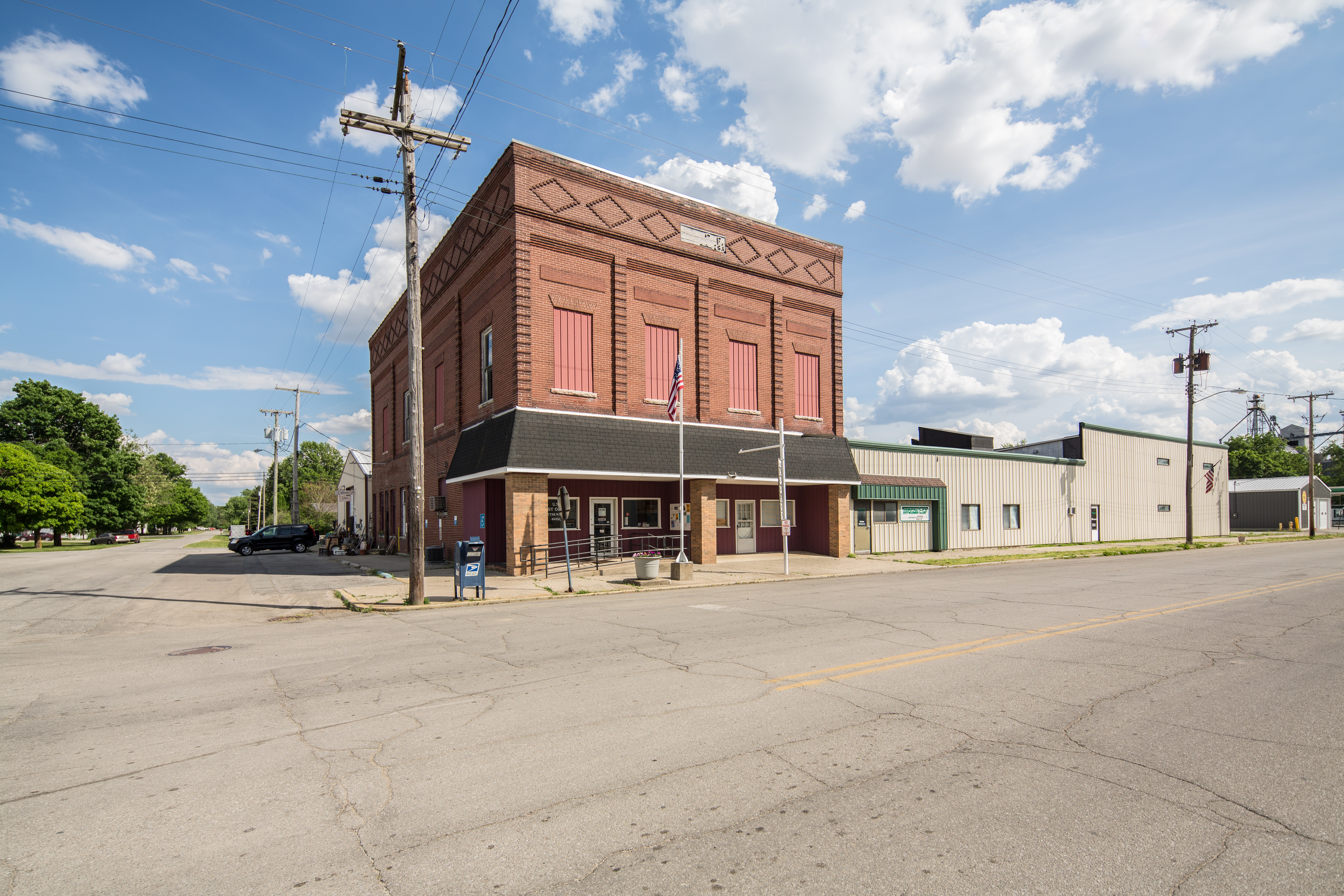
- Downtown Matthews

- Location of Matthews in Grant County, Indiana.
- Coordinates: 40°23′16″N 85°30′05″W
- Country: United States
- State: Indiana
- County: Grant
- Township: Jefferson

Area
  - Total: 0.35 sq mi (0.91 km^{2})
  - Land: 0.35 sq mi (0.91 km^{2})
  - Water: 0 sq mi (0.00 km^{2})
- Elevation: 876 ft (267 m)

Population (2020)
  - Total: 494
  - Estimate (2025): 501 ▲
  - Density: 1,401.9/sq mi (541.28/km^{2})
- Time zone: UTC-5 (Eastern (EST))
  - Summer (DST): UTC-4 (EDT)
- ZIP code: 46957
- Area code: 765
- FIPS code: 18-47592
- GNIS feature ID: 2396741
- Website: townofmatthews.com

Matthews is a town in Jefferson Township, Grant County, Indiana, United States, along the Mississinewa River. The population was 494 at the 2020 census.

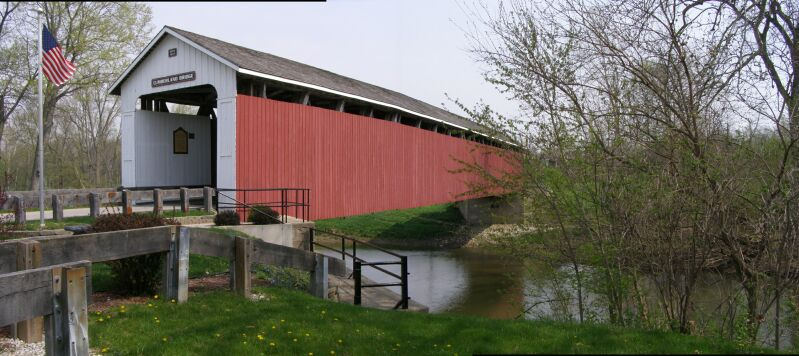
New Cumberland Covered Bridge

== History ==
Matthews was founded in 1895 and named in honor of then-governor Claude Matthews. Founders located the town near the center of the Trenton Gas Field, and it was hoped that this geographically central location could become the future capital of Indiana, moving it from Indianapolis, which had been laid out for that specific reason less than one hundred years earlier in 1825. The plan was abandoned in 1903 when the gas field was depleted, leaving the town with a main street unusually wide for its size.

Matthews was placed near an older village called New Cumberland, founded in 1833. Now the "old town" of Matthews, the village has a wooden covered bridge, the Cumberland Covered Bridge, built in 1877 which crosses the Mississinewa River. This bridge is the centerpiece of the town's annual festival and draws thousands of people every year.

=== Historic sites ===
The Cumberland Covered Bridge was built in 1877, and is 181 feet (55 m) long. It was originally named the New Cumberland Bridge and was built by a man named William Parks. It was flooded 0.5 miles (0.80 km) down the Mississinewa River in the 1913 flood. It was brought back on logs rolled by horses. The foundation was raised 33 feet (10 m) and has been stable since. It was listed on the National Register of Historic Places in 1978.

== Geography ==
According to the 2010 census, Matthews has a total area of 0.35 square miles (0.91 km^{2}), all land.

Matthews is located along the Mississinewa River.

== Demographics ==
Historical population
Census	Pop.	Note	%±
1910	688		—
1920	502		−27.0%
1930	513		2.2%
1940	468		−8.8%
1950	501		7.1%
1960	627		25.1%
1970	728		16.1%
1980	745		2.3%
1990	571		−23.4%
2000	595		4.2%
2010	596		0.2%
2020	494		−17.1%
2025 (est.)	501	▲	1.4%
U.S. Decennial Census

=== 2010 census ===
As of the census of 2010, there were 596 people, 234 households, and 166 families living in the town. The population density was 1,702.9 inhabitants per square mile (657.5/km^{2}). There were 254 housing units at an average density of 725.7 units per square mile (280.2 units/km^{2}). The racial makeup of the town was 98.0% White, 0.8% African American, 0.2% Native American, and 1.0% from two or more races. Hispanic or Latino of any race were 0.2% of the population.

There were 234 households, of which 33.3% had children under the age of 18 living with them, 54.7% were married couples living together, 10.3% had a female householder with no husband present, 6.0% had a male householder with no wife present, and 29.1% were non-families. 23.5% of all households were made up of individuals, and 11.5% had someone living alone who was 65 years of age or older. The average household size was 2.55 and the average family size was 3.01.

The median age in the town was 40.6 years. 26.5% of residents were under the age of 18; 5.3% were between the ages of 18 and 24; 22.7% were from 25 to 44; 27% were from 45 to 64; and 18.6% were 65 years of age or older. The gender makeup of the town was 48.8% male and 51.2% female.

=== 2000 census ===
As of the census of 2000, there were 595 people, 243 households, and 178 families living in the town. The population density was 656.4 people/km^{2} (1,700 people/mi^{2}). There were 259 housing units at an average density of 285.7 units/km^{2} (740 units/mi^{2}). The racial makeup of the town was 98.99% White, 0.17% Native American, and 0.84% from two or more races. Hispanic or Latino of any race were 0.17% of the population.

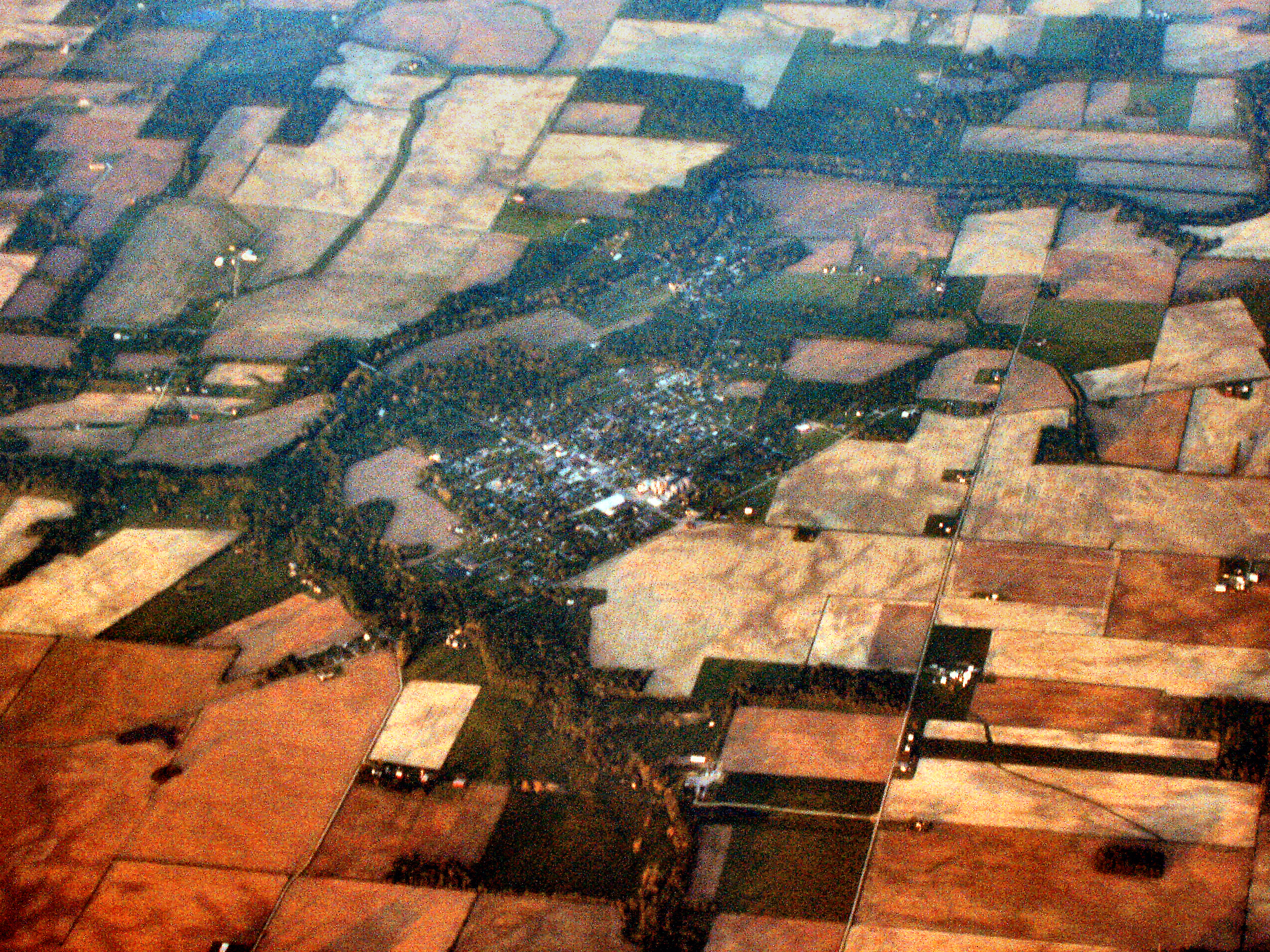
Matthews from the west.

There were 243 households, out of which 31.3% had children under the age of 18 living with them, 60.9% were married couples living together, 9.9% had a female householder with no husband present, and 26.7% were non-families. 23.9% of all households were made up of individuals, and 13.2% had someone living alone who was 65 years of age or older. The average household size was 2.45 and the average family size was 2.88.

In the town, the population was spread out, with 27.1% under the age of 18, 4.0% from 18 to 24, 30.1% from 25 to 44, 23.2% from 45 to 64, and 15.6% who were 65 years of age or older. The median age was 39 years. For every 100 females, there were 84.8 males. For every 100 females age 18 and over, there were 87.9 males.

The median income for a household in the town was $33,125, and the median income for a family was $40,139. Males had a median income of $29,911 versus $23,214 for females. The per capita income for the town was $17,283. About 4.5% of families and 5.5% of the population were below the poverty line, including 4.9% of those under age 18 and 11.0% of those age 65 or over.

== Education ==
The town has a lending library, the Matthews Public Library.
