= Hackleman, Indiana =

- Unincorporated community
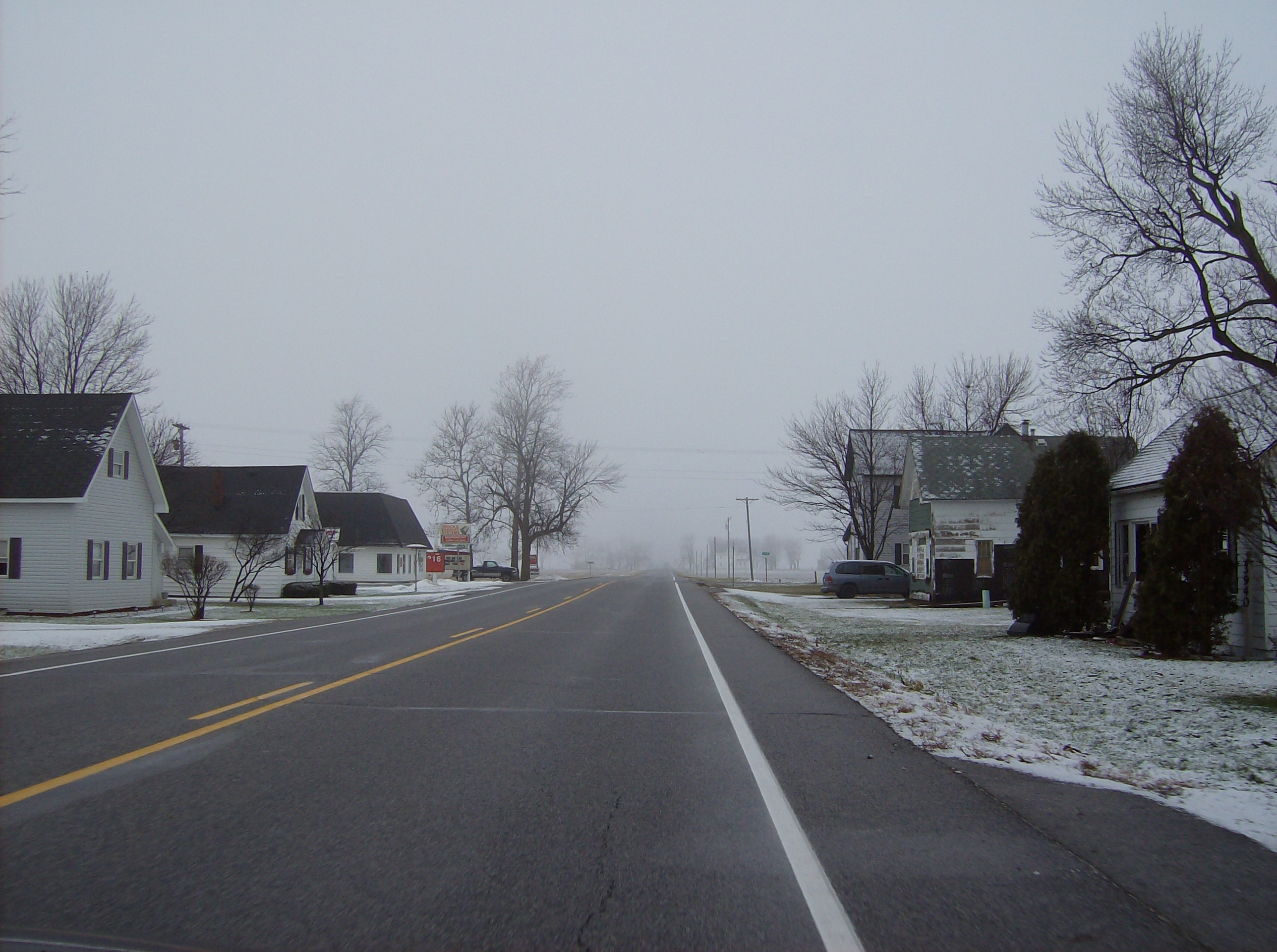
- Along State Road 26 in Hackleman

- Location within Indiana Location within the United States
- Coordinates: 40°25′18″N 85°44′53″W
- Country: United States
- State: Indiana
- County: Grant
- Township: Liberty
- Elevation: 879 ft (268 m)
- ZIP code: 46928
- FIPS code: 18-30330
- GNIS feature ID: 435581

Hackleman is a small unincorporated community in central Liberty Township, Grant County, Indiana.

== History ==
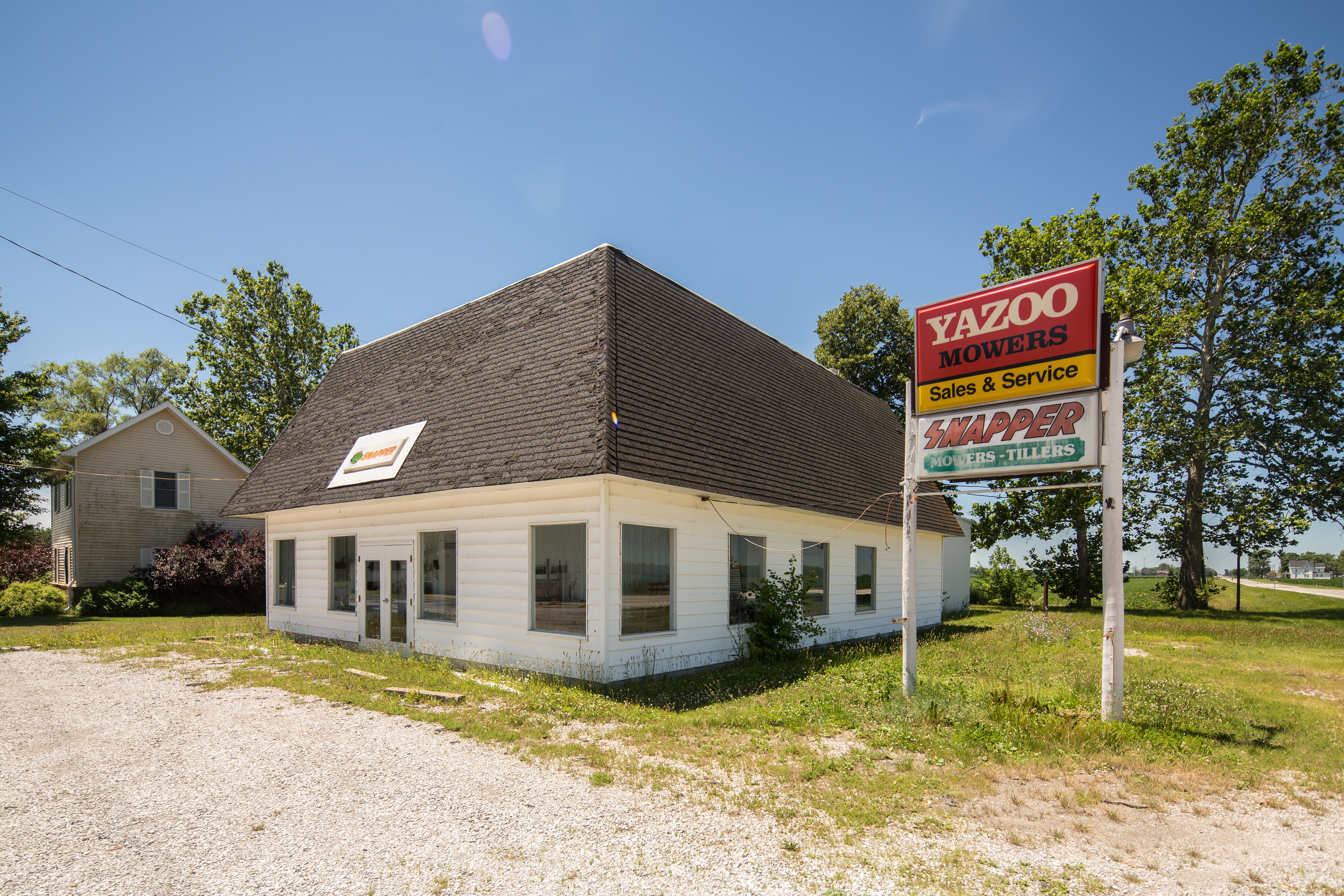
Photo from Small Town Indiana photo survey.

Hackleman was named for Pleasant A. Hackleman, a Franklin County-born Union general who was killed during the American Civil War. A post office was established at Hackleman in 1871, and remained in operation until it was discontinued in 1902.

== Geography ==
Hackleman is located at the intersection of State Road 26 and County Road 400 West.
