= Cumberland Covered Bridge =

- U.S. National Register of Historic Places
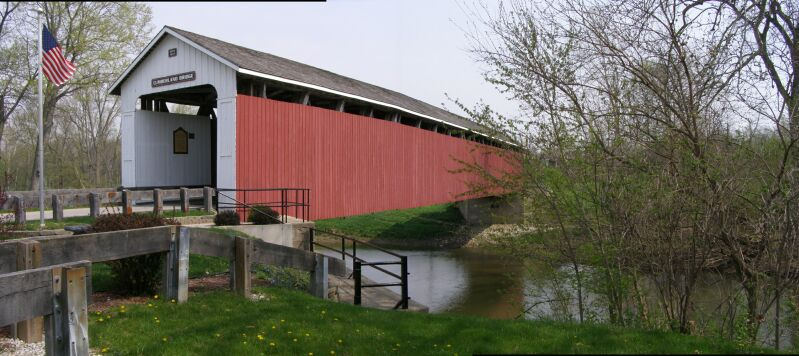
- Cumberland Covered Bridge, Matthews, Indiana

- Location within Indiana Location within the United States
- Location: CR 1000 over Mississinewa River, Matthews, Indiana
- Coordinates: 40°23′19″N 85°29′5″W
- Area: 0.1 acres (0.040 ha)
- Built: 1877
- Architect: Smith Bridge Company
- Architectural style: Howe Truss
- NRHP reference No.: 78000032
- Added to NRHP: May 22, 1978

The Cumberland Covered Bridge, also known as the Matthews Covered Bridge, is a historic covered bridge spanning the Mississinewa River at Jefferson Township and Matthews, Indiana. It was originally called the New Cumberland Covered Bridge, it was built in 1877 by William Parks of Marion, Indiana. This Howe Truss bridge is 181 feet (55 m) long. It is the only remaining covered bridge in Grant County.

It was listed on the National Register of Historic Places in 1978.

== Floods ==
The bridge was floated 0.5 miles (0.80 km) downstream during the 1913 flood. It was returned upstream on rollers dragged by horses. The foundations were raised an additional 3 feet (0.91 m) at that time. The 1958 flood only loosened a few boards.

== See also ==
- List of bridges documented by the Historic American Engineering Record in Indiana
