= Wheeling, Delaware County, Indiana =

Wheeling
- Unincorporated community
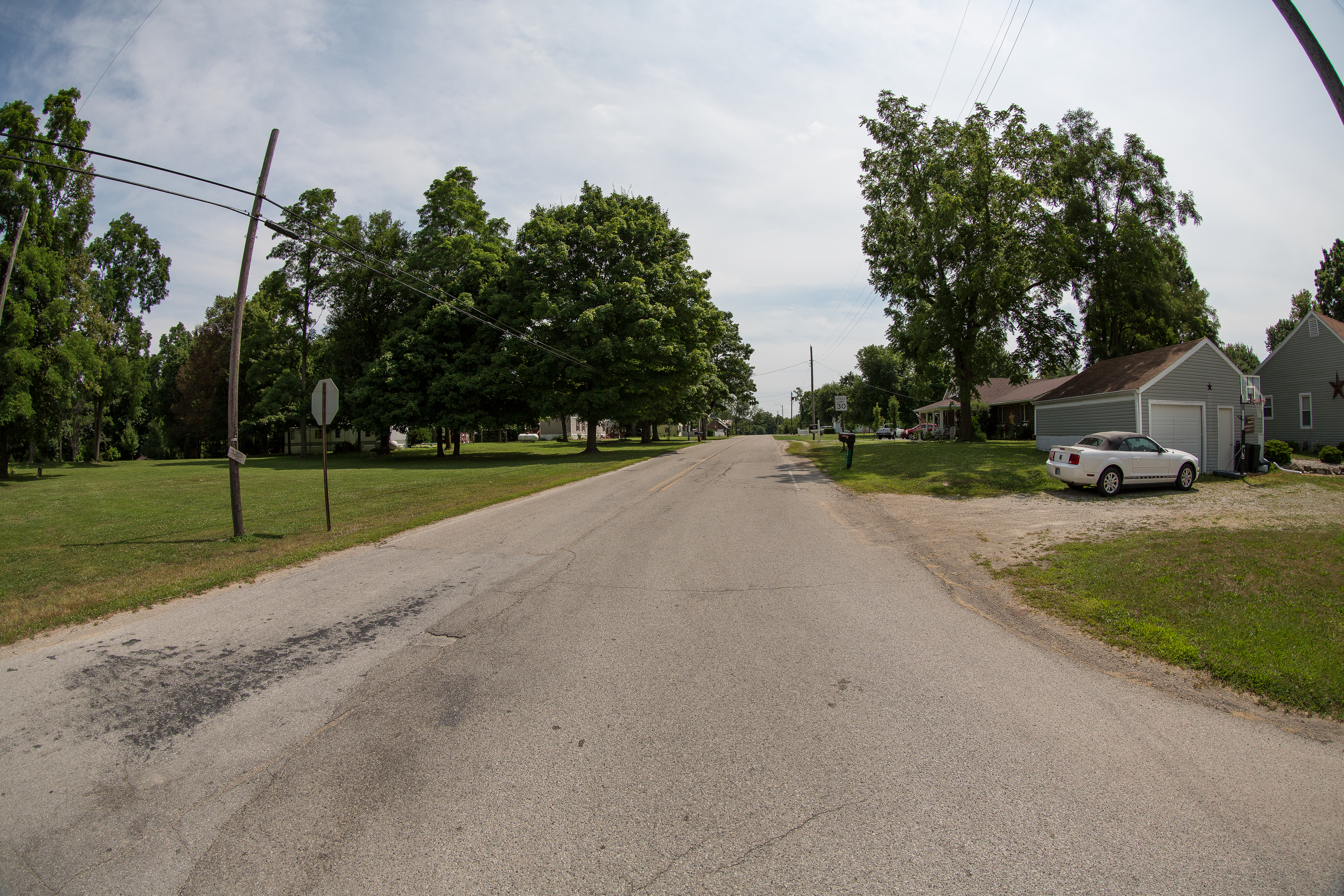

- Location within Indiana Location within the United States
- Coordinates: 40°21′49″N 85°27′51″W
- Country: United States
- State: Indiana
- County: Delaware
- Township: Washington
- Elevation: 879 ft (268 m)
- ZIP code: 47303
- FIPS code: 18-83636
- GNIS feature ID: 445895

Wheeling is an unincorporated community in Washington Township, Delaware County, Indiana.

== History ==
The post office Wheeling once contained was originally called Cranberry. The Cranberry post office was started in 1834, renamed Wheeling in 1838, and remained in operation until it was discontinued in 1933.
