= Van Buren Township, Madison County, Indiana =

Van Buren Township
- Township
- Location in Madison County
- Coordinates: 40°20′35″N 85°37′31″W
- Country: United States
- State: Indiana
- County: Madison

Government
  - Type: Indiana township

Area
  - Total: 24.99 sq mi (64.7 km^{2})
  - Land: 24.98 sq mi (64.7 km^{2})
  - Water: 0.01 sq mi (0.026 km^{2}) 0.04%
- Elevation: 889 ft (271 m)

Population (2020)
  - Total: 1,801
  - Density: 74.5/sq mi (28.8/km^{2})
- ZIP code: 46070
- GNIS feature ID: 0453949

Van Buren Township is one of fourteen townships in Madison County, Indiana, United States. As of the 2010 census, its population was 1,861 and it contained 795 housing units.

== History ==
Van Buren Township was organized in 1837. It was named for President Martin Van Buren.

== Geography ==
According to the 2010 census, the township has a total area of 24.99 square miles (64.7 km^{2}), of which 24.98 square miles (64.7 km^{2}) (or 99.96%) is land and 0.01 square miles (0.026 km^{2}) (or 0.04%) is water.

=== Cities, towns, villages ===
- Summitville

=== Cemeteries ===
The township contains these three cemeteries: Broyles, Musick, and Vinson.

=== Major highways ===
- Indiana State Road 9

== Education ==
It is in Madison-Grant United School Corporation. The district's comprehensive high school is in Madison-Grant High School.

Van Buren Township residents may obtain a free library card from the North Madison County Public Library System with branches in Elwood, Frankton, and Summitville.

== Political districts ==
- Indiana's 5th congressional district
- State House District 35
- State Senate District 26
