= Summitville, Indiana =

- Town
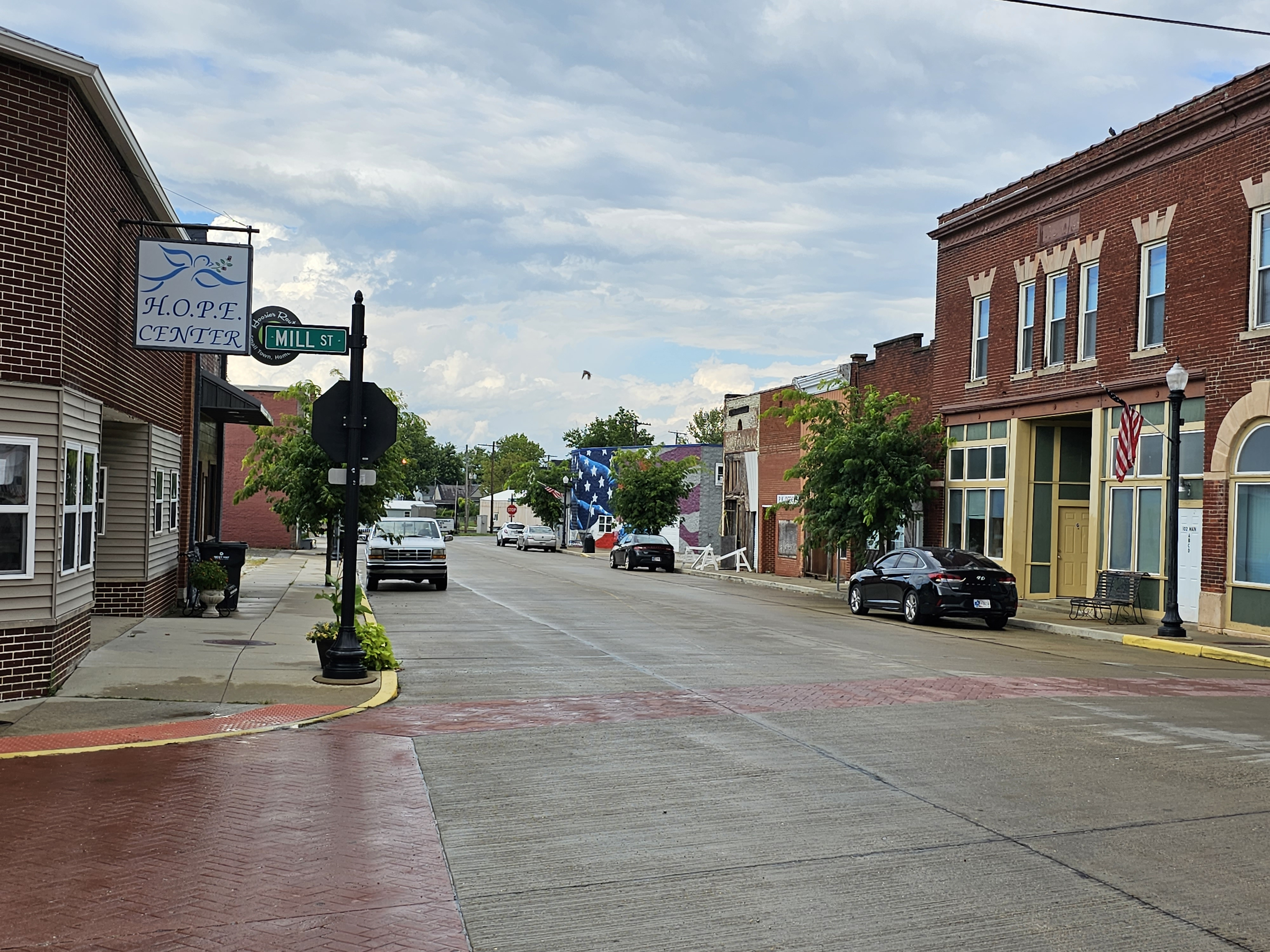

- Seal

- Location in Madison County, Indiana
- Coordinates: 40°20′10″N 85°38′37″W
- Country: United States
- State: Indiana
- County: Madison
- Township: Van Buren

Area
  - Total: 0.57 sq mi (1.47 km^{2})
  - Land: 0.57 sq mi (1.47 km^{2})
  - Water: 0 sq mi (0.00 km^{2})
- Elevation: 879 ft (268 m)

Population (2020)
  - Total: 989
  - Estimate (2025): 999 ▲
  - Density: 1,748/sq mi (674.8/km^{2})
- Time zone: UTC-5 (Eastern (EST))
  - Summer (DST): UTC-4 (EDT)
- ZIP code: 46070
- Area code: 765
- FIPS code: 18-74132
- GNIS feature ID: 2397687
- Website: summitville.in.gov

Summitville is a town in Van Buren Township, Madison County, Indiana, United States. It is part of the Indianapolis–Carmel–Anderson metropolitan statistical area. The population was 989 at the 2020 census.

== History ==
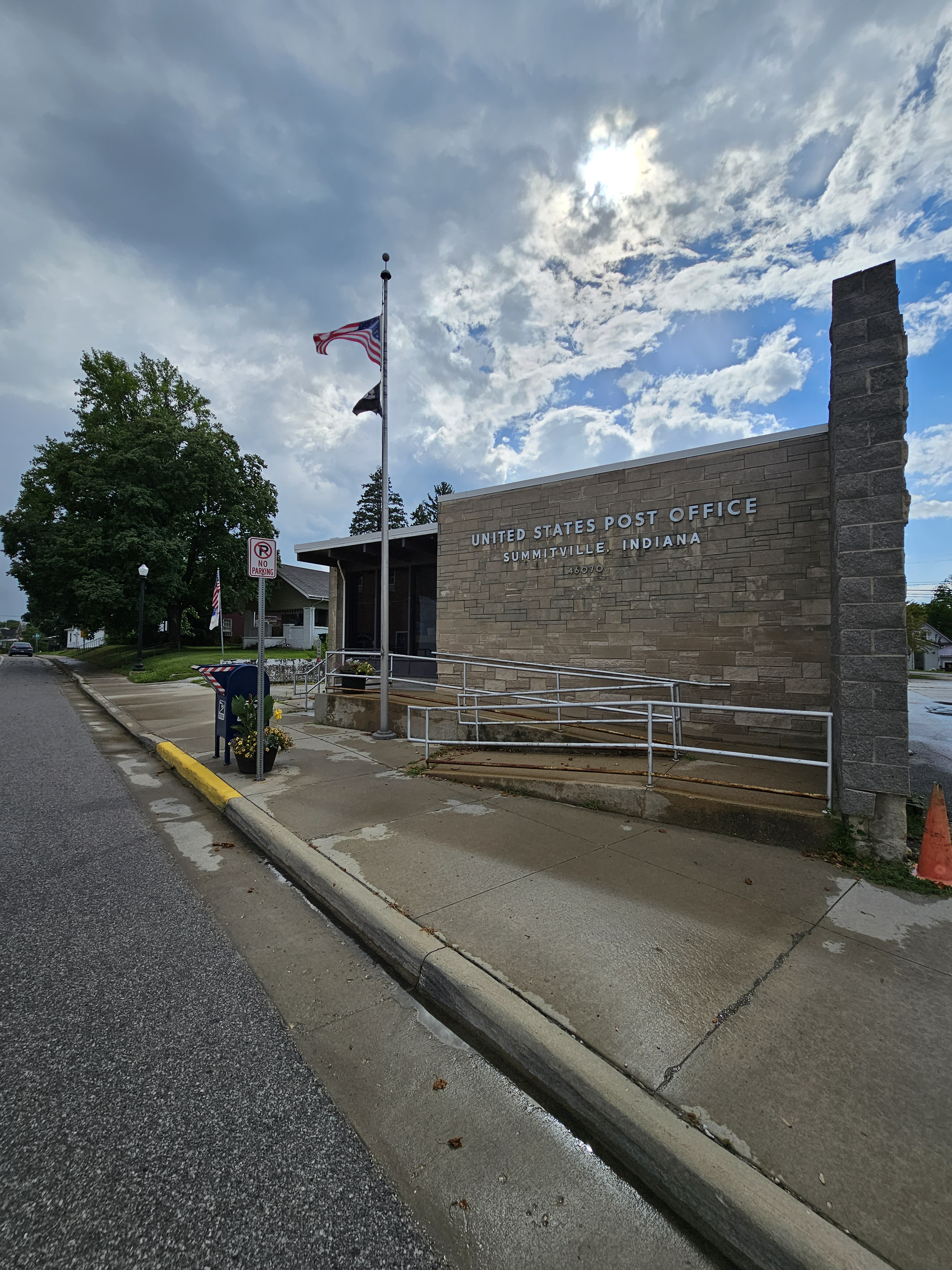
Summitville Indiana Post Office

Summitville was laid out in 1867. It was named for its relatively lofty elevation.

The Joseph & Lucinda Thawley House was listed in the National Register of Historic Places in 2009.

== Geography ==
Summitville is in northeastern Madison County 6 miles (10 km) north-northeast of Alexandria and 17 miles (27 km) north of Anderson, the county seat.

According to the U.S. Census Bureau, Summitville has a total area of 0.57 square miles (1.48 km^{2}), all land. The headwaters of Mud Creek pass to the west of the town limits, flowing southward to join Pipe Creek, a tributary of the White River, at Alexandria.

== Demographics ==
Historical population
Census	Pop.	Note	%±
1880	400		—
1890	752		88.0%
1900	1,432		90.4%
1910	1,387		−3.1%
1920	1,001		−27.8%
1930	1,017		1.6%
1940	991		−2.6%
1950	1,061		7.1%
1960	1,048		−1.2%
1970	1,104		5.3%
1980	1,085		−1.7%
1990	1,010		−6.9%
2000	1,090		7.9%
2010	967		−11.3%
2020	989		2.3%
2025 (est.)	999	▲	1.0%
U.S. Decennial Census

=== 2010 census ===
As of the census of 2010, there were 967 people, 378 households, and 268 families living in the town. The population density was 1,973.5 inhabitants per square mile (762.0/km^{2}). There were 430 housing units at an average density of 877.6 per square mile (338.8/km^{2}). The racial makeup of the town was 96.6% White, 0.7% African American, 0.1% Native American, 1.4% from other races, and 1.1% from two or more races. Hispanic or Latino of any race were 2.1% of the population.

There were 378 households, of which 34.9% had children under the age of 18 living with them, 53.7% were married couples living together, 10.8% had a female householder with no husband present, 6.3% had a male householder with no wife present, and 29.1% were non-families. 24.3% of all households were made up of individuals, and 10.6% had someone living alone who was 65 years of age or older. The average household size was 2.56 and the average family size was 3.01.

The median age in the town was 39.6 years. 25.7% of residents were under the age of 18; 8% were between the ages of 18 and 24; 25.2% were from 25 to 44; 27.9% were from 45 to 64; and 13.3% were 65 years of age or older. The gender makeup of the town was 49.9% male and 50.1% female.

=== 2000 census ===
As of the census of 2000, there were 1,090 people, 420 households, and 304 families living in the town. The population density was 2,023.6 inhabitants per square mile (781.3/km^{2}). There were 437 housing units at an average density of 811.3 per square mile (313.2/km^{2}). The racial makeup of the town was 99.45% White, 0.28% African American, 0.09% Native American, 0.09% Asian, and 0.09% from two or more races. Hispanic or Latino of any race were 0.55% of the population.

There were 420 households, out of which 35.0% had children under the age of 18 living with them, 59.8% were married couples living together, 9.5% had a female householder with no husband present, and 27.6% were non-families. 25.5% of all households were made up of individuals, and 13.1% had someone living alone who was 65 years of age or older. The average household size was 2.60 and the average family size was 3.07.

In the town, the population was spread out, with 29.6% under the age of 18, 5.7% from 18 to 24, 30.8% from 25 to 44, 20.5% from 45 to 64, and 13.4% who were 65 years of age or older. The median age was 34 years. For every 100 females, there were 92.6 males. For every 100 females age 18 and over, there were 90.3 males.

The median income for a household in the town was $37,303, and the median income for a family was $42,500. Males had a median income of $31,908 versus $23,382 for females. The per capita income for the town was $18,311. About 5.2% of families and 7.9% of the population were below the poverty line, including 14.6% of those under age 18 and 8.8% of those age 65 or over.

== Education ==
Summitville is a part of the Madison-Grant United School Corporation. Summitville is home to an elementary school, Summitville Elementary School. Students move on to Madison-Grant Junior High School and Madison-Grant High School near Fairmount.

Summitville has a public library, a branch of the North Madison County Public Library System.

== Notable people ==
Summitville was the birthplace of former game show announcer Jay Stewart.

Roy Danforth, class of 1954 from Summitville High School, was the basketball coach at Syracuse and Tulane University. He coached Syracuse to the Final Four in the 1975 NCAA tournament. He is a member of the Indiana Basketball Hall of Fame.
