= Fowlerton, Indiana =

- Town
- Location of Fowlerton in Grant County, Indiana.
- Coordinates: 40°24′35″N 85°34′22″W
- Country: United States
- State: Indiana
- County: Grant
- Township: Fairmount

Area
  - Total: 0.20 sq mi (0.51 km^{2})
  - Land: 0.20 sq mi (0.51 km^{2})
  - Water: 0 sq mi (0.00 km^{2})
- Elevation: 879 ft (268 m)

Population (2020)
  - Total: 268
  - Density: 1,370.3/sq mi (529.06/km^{2})
- Time zone: UTC−5 (EST)
  - Summer (DST): UTC−5 (EST)
- ZIP Code: 46930
- Area code: 765
- FIPS code: 18-25198
- GNIS feature ID: 2396946
- Website: www.townoffowlerton.com

Fowlerton is a town in Fairmount Township, Grant County, Indiana, United States. The population was 268 at the 2020 census.

== History ==
Fowlerton was called Leach when it was founded. The Leach post office was established in 1895, and was renamed Fowlerton in 1902. Fowlerton was a booming town with multiple stores, bars, and this small town even had its own locomotive station; at least up until the Great Flood of 1913, which wiped out the entire town and left buildings, homes, and debris deep under water.

== Geography ==
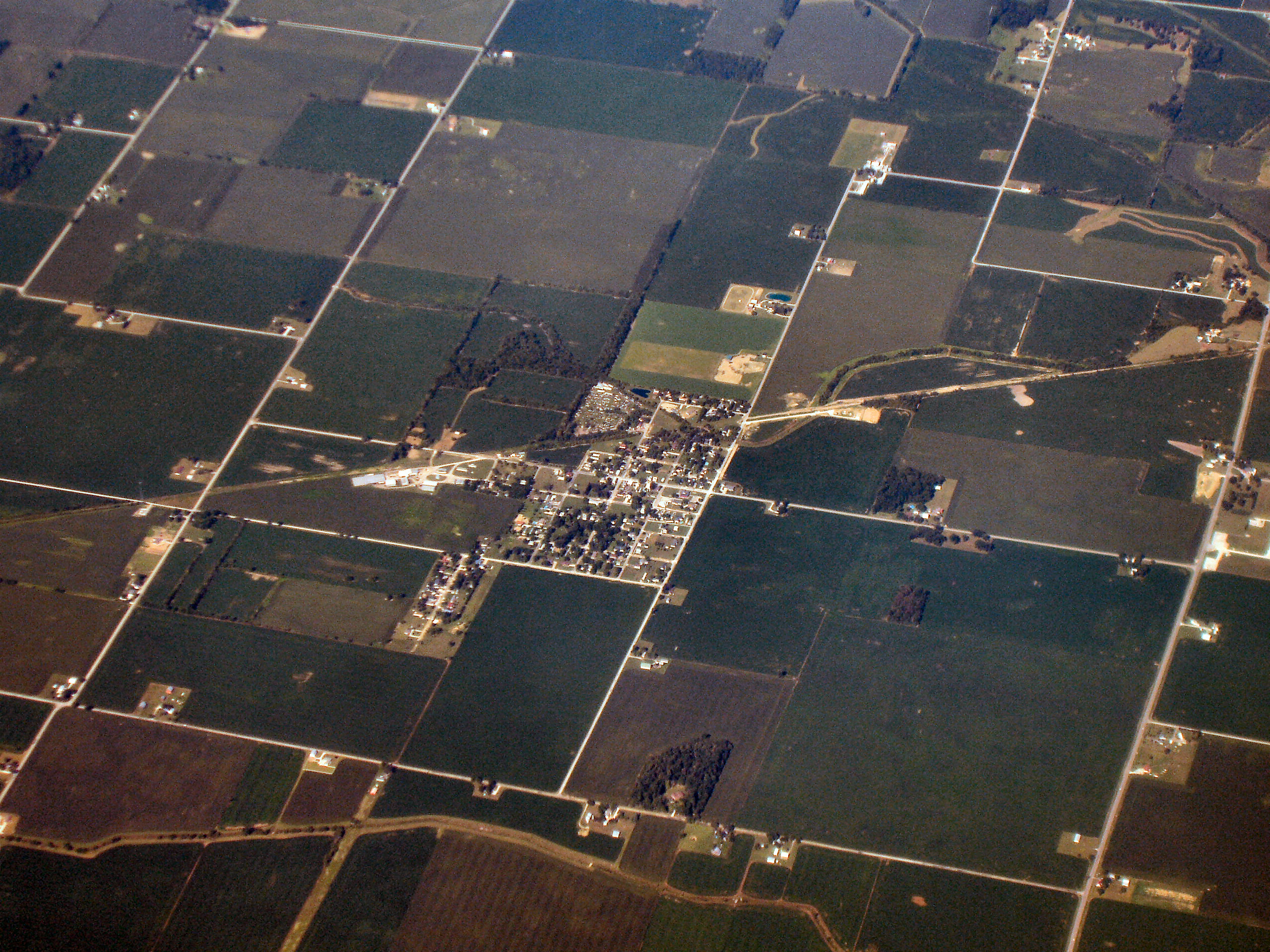
Fowlerton from the air, looking southwest.

According to the 2010 census, Fowlerton has a total area of 0.2 square miles (0.52 km^{2}), all land.

Until it was sold in 1955, the Meguiar's Catsup & Chili Sauce factory was in Fowlerton. The factory facilities are currently in disrepair, but some buildings are still standing.

== Demographics ==
Historical population
| Census | Pop. | Note | %± |
|---|---|---|---|
| 1910 | 293 | | — |
| 1920 | 225 | | −23.2% |
| 1930 | 204 | | −9.3% |
| 1940 | 255 | | 25.0% |
| 1950 | 292 | | 14.5% |
| 1960 | 297 | | 1.7% |
| 1970 | 337 | | 13.5% |
| 1980 | 300 | | −11.0% |
| 1990 | 306 | | 2.0% |
| 2000 | 298 | | −2.6% |
| 2010 | 261 | | −12.4% |
| 2020 | 268 | | 2.7% |
U.S. Decennial Census

=== 2010 census ===
As of the census of 2010, there were 261 people, 100 households, and 80 families living in the town. The population density was 1,305.0 inhabitants per square mile (503.9/km^{2}). There were 113 housing units at an average density of 565.0 per square mile (218.1/km^{2}). The racial makeup of the town was 98.9% White and 1.1% from two or more races. Hispanic or Latino of any race were 0.4% of the population.

There were 100 households, of which 35.0% had children under the age of 18 living with them, 59.0% were married couples living together, 14.0% had a female householder with no husband present, 7.0% had a male householder with no wife present, and 20.0% were non-families. Of all households 19.0% were made up of individuals, and 8% had someone living alone who was 65 years of age or older. The average household size was 2.61 and the average family size was 2.94.

The median age in the town was 43.9 years. 25.7% of residents were under the age of 18; 5.7% were between the ages of 18 and 24; 20.4% were from 25 to 44; 30.5% were from 45 to 64; and 17.6% were 65 years of age or older. The gender makeup of the town was 51.0% male and 49.0% female.

=== 2000 census ===
As of the census of 2000, there were 298 people, 113 households, and 82 families living in the town. The population density was 1,584.0 inhabitants per square mile (611.6/km^{2}). There were 120 housing units at an average density of 637.9 per square mile (246.3/km^{2}). The racial makeup of the town was 99.66% White and 0.34% African American. Hispanic or Latino of any race were 1.01% of the population.

There were 113 households, out of which 31.0% had children under the age of 18 living with them, 58.4% were married couples living together, 9.7% had a female householder with no husband present, and 27.4% were non-families. 20.4% were made up of individuals, and 11.5% had someone living alone who was 65 years of age or older. The average household size was 2.64 and the average family size was 3.07.

In the town, the population was spread out, with 25.5% under the age of 18, 7.4% from 18 to 24, 29.5% from 25 to 44, 25.8% from 45 to 64, and 11.7% who were 65 years of age or older. The median age was 37 years. For every 100 females, there were 93.5 males. For every 100 females age 18 and over, there were 100.0 males.

The median income for a household in the town was $28,750, and the median income for a family was $31,250. Males had a median income of $27,750 versus $17,500 for females. The per capita income for the town was $12,615. About 12.5% of families and 18.6% of the population were below the poverty line, including 34.2% of those under the age of eighteen and 12.5% of those 65 or over.

== Education ==
Residents are in the Madison-Grant United School Corporation. Madison-Grant High School is the zoned high school.
