= Stockport, Indiana =

Stockport
- Unincorporated community
- Location within Indiana Location within the United States
- Coordinates: 40°19′15″N 85°27′38″W
- Country: United States
- State: Indiana
- County: Delaware
- Township: Washington
- Elevation: 892 ft (272 m)
- ZIP code: 47342
- FIPS code: 18-73295
- GNIS feature ID: 444182

Stockport is an unincorporated community in Washington Township, Delaware County, Indiana.

== Geography ==
Stockport is 10 miles (16 km) from Muncie, the county seat.

== History ==
Stockport was a station on the railroad. It was likely named for its livestock trade.

Stockport became a town on the C, I and E Railroad, and by 1901 was considered "a little town" on the rail line. A post office was established at Stockport in 1892, and remained in operation until it was discontinued in 1914.

Stockport was the home of William "Bill" McKinley, the cousin of U.S. President William McKinley, who owned a general store in the community during the early 20th century.

In 1940, the population was 15.

== See also ==
- Progress, Indiana
