= Boone Township, Madison County, Indiana =

Boone Township
- Township
- Location in Madison County
- Coordinates: 40°20′27″N 85°43′35″W
- Country: United States
- State: Indiana
- County: Madison

Government
  - Type: Indiana township

Area
  - Total: 30.14 sq mi (78.1 km^{2})
  - Land: 30.14 sq mi (78.1 km^{2})
  - Water: 0 sq mi (0 km^{2}) 0%
- Elevation: 889 ft (271 m)

Population (2020)
  - Total: 599
  - Density: 21.9/sq mi (8.5/km^{2})
- ZIP codes: 46001, 46036, 46070, 46928
- GNIS feature ID: 0453129

Boone Township is one of fourteen townships in Madison County, Indiana, United States. As of the 2010 census, its population was 661 and it contained 270 housing units.

It was named for Daniel Boone.

== Geography ==
According to the 2010 census, the township has a total area of 30.14 square miles (78.1 km^{2}), all land.

=== Cemeteries ===
The township contains these two cemeteries: Carver and Forrestville.

=== Major highways ===
- Indiana State Road 9
- Indiana State Road 37

== Education ==
It is in Madison-Grant United School Corporation. The district's comprehensive high school is in Madison-Grant High School.

Boone Township residents may obtain a free library card from the North Madison County Public Library System with branches in Elwood, Frankton, and Summitville.

== Political districts ==
- Indiana's 5th congressional district
- State House District 35
- State Senate District 20
