= Duck Creek Township, Madison County, Indiana =

Duck Creek Township
- Township
- Location in Madison County
- Coordinates: 40°19′59″N 85°49′17″W
- Country: United States
- State: Indiana
- County: Madison

Government
  - Type: Indiana township

Area
  - Total: 23.98 sq mi (62.1 km^{2})
  - Land: 23.98 sq mi (62.1 km^{2})
  - Water: 0 sq mi (0 km^{2}) 0%
- Elevation: 863 ft (263 m)

Population (2020)
  - Total: 534
  - Density: 22.8/sq mi (8.8/km^{2})
- ZIP code: 46036
- GNIS feature ID: 0453267

Duck Creek Township is one of fourteen townships in Madison County, Indiana, United States. As of the 2010 census, its population was 548 and it contained 240 housing units.

== History ==
Duck Creek Township was organized in 1852. It takes its name from a stream in the southeastern part.

== Geography ==
According to the 2010 census, the township has a total area of 23.98 square miles (62.1 km^{2}), all land.

=== Cities, towns, villages ===
- Elwood (north edge)

=== Unincorporated towns ===
- College Corner at 40.305872°N 85.841925°W
- Leisure at 40.364206°N 85.843037°W

(This list is based on USGS data and may include former settlements.)

=== Cemeteries ===
The township contains Waymire Cemetery.

=== Major highways ===
- Indiana State Road 37

== Education ==
Most of the township is in Madison-Grant United School Corporation while the southern portion is in the Elwood Community School Corporation. The former district's comprehensive high school is Madison-Grant High School.

Duck Creek Township residents may obtain a free library card from the North Madison County Public Library System with branches in Elwood, Frankton, and Summitville.

== Political districts ==
- Indiana's 5th congressional district
- State House District 35
- State Senate District 20
