= Madison-Grant Jr./Sr. High School =

Location
- 11700 S E 00 W Fairmount, Grant County, Indiana 46928; United States; 40.384127°N 85.673700°W

Information
- Type: Public high school
- School district: Madison-Grant United School Corporation
- Principal: David Retherford
- Teaching staff: 32.50 (FTE)
- Grades: 7–12
- Enrollment: 504 (2023–2024)
- Student to teacher ratio: 15.51
- Color
- Athletics conference: Central Indiana Athletic Conference
- Mascot: Argylls
- Website: mghs.mgusc.k12.in.us

Madison-Grant Jr./Sr. High School is a public high school located in unincorporated Grant County, Indiana, near Fairmount. It is the only high school in the United States with the Argyll mascot. It is a part of the Madison-Grant United School Corporation.

Madison-Grant Jr./Sr. High School is located at 11700 South State Road 9, about a half-mile from the Madison County/Grant County line.

In Grant County it serves Fairmount, Fowlerton, and Point Isabel, and in Madison County it serves Summitville.

== Athletics ==
Madison-Grant offers a variety of athletic opportunities to its students. Mixed-gender athletics include cheerleading, cross-country, track, bowling and wrestling. Female sports include volleyball, softball, tennis and golf. Male sports include football, baseball, tennis and golf.

Madison-Grant is a class 2A member of the Indiana High School Athletic Association.

== Clubs and other extra-curriculars ==
Madison-Grant also has several non-athletic activities for its student body. These include an Academic Team, Students Against Destructive Decisions (SADD), Family Career and Community Leaders of America (FCCLA), Young Republicans, art club, science club, and Campus Life. The school also offers musical ensembles for credit such as beginning and advanced concert band, jazz ensemble, beginning/mixed chorus, ladies chorus, and advanced chorus/show choir. Madison Grant offers many more clubs.

== Athletic achievements ==
In 2009, Madison-Grant won the Indiana class 2A State Championship in softball. In 2010, the Madison-Grant Girls volleyball team lost in Semi-State of the State Volleyball Tournament after winning their respective 2A Regional Title. In 1985, the Boys golf team qualified for the Indiana State Championship Tournament. In 2015, Madison-Grant won an Indiana class 2A boys' basketball sectional. Madison Grant Wrestling Team sent a wrestler to the state championship in 2018 and 2025.

== See also ==
- List of high schools in Indiana
