= National Register of Historic Places listings in Grant County, Indiana =

Location of Grant County in Indiana

This is a list of the National Register of Historic Places listings in Grant County, Indiana.

This is intended to be a complete list of the properties and districts on the National Register of Historic Places in Grant County, Indiana, United States. Latitude and longitude coordinates are provided for many National Register properties and districts; these locations may be seen together in a map.

There are 23 properties and districts listed on the National Register in the county, including one National Historic Landmark.

Properties and districts located in incorporated areas display the name of the municipality, while properties and districts in unincorporated areas display the name of their civil township. Properties and districts split between multiple jurisdictions display the names of all jurisdictions.

This National Park Service list is complete through NPS recent listings posted May 22, 2026.

== Current listings ==
	Name on the Register	Image	Date listed	Location	City or town	Description
1	Baldwin Addition Historic District	Baldwin Addition Historic District	September 9, 1999 (#99001108)	Roughly along Main St., between 2nd and 4th Sts. 40°25′06″N 85°39′00″W	Fairmount	
2	Cumberland Covered Bridge	Cumberland Covered Bridge	May 22, 1978 (#78000032)	CR 1000 over the Mississinewa River; 40°23′19″N 85°29′05″W	Jefferson Township and Matthews	
3	Fairmount Commercial Historic District	Fairmount Commercial Historic District	March 12, 1999 (#99000295)	205-101 and 124-102 S. Main, 102-124 and 101-123 N. Main, 107 W. 1st, and 119-117 W. Washington; 40°24′57″N 85°39′02″W	Fairmount	
4	First Friends Church		May 28, 2026 (#100013072)	1501 South Adams Street; 40°32′50″N 85°39′31″W	Marion	
5	First Presbyterian Church	First Presbyterian Church	December 3, 2018 (#100003184)	216 W. 6th St. 40°33′23″N 85°39′42″W	Marion	
6	Gas City High School	Gas City High School	March 5, 2004 (#03001316)	400 E. South A St. 40°29′11″N 85°36′31″W	Gas City	
7	Grant County Jail and Sheriff's Residence	Grant County Jail and Sheriff's Residence	November 19, 1990 (#83004526)	215 E. 3rd St. 40°33′33″N 85°39′28″W	Marion	
8	Abijah C. Jay House	Abijah C. Jay House	March 27, 2003 (#03000145)	118 W. 7th St. 40°33′19″N 85°39′39″W	Marion	
9	Israel Jenkins House	Israel Jenkins House	March 26, 2003 (#03000139)	7453 E400S, southeast of Marion; 40°29′49″N 85°31′40″W	Monroe Township	
10	Marion Branch, National Home for Disabled Volunteer Soldiers Historic District	Marion Branch, National Home for Disabled Volunteer Soldiers Historic District	August 2, 1999 (#99000833)	1700 E. 38th St. 40°31′12″N 85°38′02″W	Marion	
11	Marion Downtown Commercial Historic District	Marion Downtown Commercial Historic District	March 17, 1994 (#94000226)	Roughly bounded by 7th, 2nd, Branson, and Gallatin Sts. 40°33′27″N 85°39′35″W	Marion	
12	Marion Firestone Auto Supply & Service Center		March 3, 2025 (#100011481)	625 South Washington Street; 40°33′19″N 85°39′35″W	Marion	
13	Marion First United Methodist Church		September 2, 2025 (#100012180)	624 South Adams Street; 40°33′20″N 85°39′31″W	Marion	
14	Marion PCC & St. Louis Railroad Depot	Marion PCC & St. Louis Railroad Depot	September 4, 2018 (#100002861)	1002 S. Washington St. 40°33′06″N 85°39′37″W	Marion	
15	Meshingomesia (Mihsiinkweemisa) Cemetery and Indian School Historic District	Meshingomesia (Mihsiinkweemisa) Cemetery and Indian School Historic District	January 9, 2013 (#12001149)	3820 W600N, northeast of Jalapa; 40°38′28″N 85°43′50″W	Pleasant Township	
16	J.W. Patterson House	J.W. Patterson House	November 14, 1979 (#79000016)	203 and 209 E. Washington St. 40°24′57″N 85°38′57″W	Fairmount	209 Washington represents a boundary increase of January 18, 1985
17	Joseph W. and Edith M. Stephenson House	Joseph W. and Edith M. Stephenson House	August 26, 2021 (#100006848)	917 S. Adams St. 40°33′09″N 85°39′30″W	Marion	
18	Aaron Swayzee House	Aaron Swayzee House	June 16, 1983 (#83000124)	224 N. Washington St. 40°33′50″N 85°39′32″W	Marion	
19	Thompson-Ray House	Thompson-Ray House	September 24, 2009 (#09000756)	407 E. Main St. 40°29′18″N 85°36′31″W	Gas City	
20	George, Jr. and Marie Daugherty Webster House	George, Jr. and Marie Daugherty Webster House	June 17, 1992 (#92000678)	926 S. Washington St. 40°33′09″N 85°39′37″W	Marion	
21	West Ward School	West Ward School	December 19, 1985 (#85003226)	210 W. North A St. 40°29′21″N 85°37′02″W	Gas City	
22	J. Woodrow Wilson House	J. Woodrow Wilson House	August 11, 1988 (#88001218)	723 W. 4th St. 40°33′27″N 85°40′04″W	Marion	
23	Woodside	Woodside	December 24, 1997 (#97001538)	1119 Overlook Rd., north of Marion; 40°35′20″N 85°40′28″W	Washington Township	A Frank Lloyd Wright-designed Usonion home

== See also ==
- List of National Historic Landmarks in Indiana
- National Register of Historic Places listings in Indiana
- Listings in neighboring counties: Blackford, Delaware, Howard, Huntington, Madison, Miami, Tipton, Wabash, Wells
- List of Indiana state historical markers in Grant County
