= List of Indiana state historical markers in Grant County =

Location of Grant County in Indiana

This is a list of the Indiana state historical markers in Grant County.

This is intended to be a complete list of the official state historical markers placed in Grant County, Indiana, United States by the Indiana Historical Bureau. The locations of the historical markers and their latitude and longitude coordinates are included below when available, along with their names, years of placement, and topics as recorded by the Historical Bureau. There are 11 historical markers located in Grant County.

== Historical markers ==
Marker title	Image	Year placed	Location	Topics
Battle of Mississinewa		1947	Southeastern corner of the junction of State Road 15 and County Road 600N near Marion; 40°38′24″N 85°42′34″W	Military, American Indian/Native American
New Purchase Boundary (Treaty of St. Mary's)		1966	Northwestern corner of the Grant County Courthouse lawn at 401 S. Adams St. in Marion; 40°33′31″N 85°39′26″W	Early Settlement and Exploration, American Indian/Native American, Government Institutions
Miami Indian Cemetery		1972	North of Marion on State Road 15, 1.1 miles west on County Road 600N; 40°38′25″N 85°43′49″W	Cemetery, American Indian/Native American
[West Ward School]		1988	210 W. North A Street in Gas City; 40°29′20″N 85°37′2″W	Buildings and Architecture, Education
Former Narrow Gauge Railroad/Railroad Construction		1992	Junction of E. 4th and McClure Streets in Marion; 40°33′28″N 85°39′21.6″W	Transportation, Business, Industry, and Labor
J.W. Patterson House		1995	203 E. Washington Street in Fairmount; 40°24′57″N 85°38′57.6″W	Buildings and Architecture, Science, Medicine, and Inventions
The Village of Trask		1995	Junction of State Road 26 and S. Wheeling Pike at Trask, 1.4 miles east of exit 55 from Interstate 69; 40°25′22.6″N 85°31′23″W	Historic District, Neighborhoods, and Towns
Marion Branch, NHDVS		2011	1700 E. 38th St., Marion; 40°25′22.6″N 85°31′23″W	Military, Buildings and Architecture
Samuel Plato		2014	723 West Fourth Street, Marion; 40°33′28″N 85°40′4″W	Buildings & Architecture, Architect, African American
Weaver Settlement		2020	2600 W 600 S, Marion; 40°27′57″N 85°43′12″W	
Allen Temple		2022	Allen Temple AME Church, 3440 S. Washington St., Marion; 40°31′41″N 85°39′44″W	African American, Religion

== See also ==
- List of Indiana state historical markers
- National Register of Historic Places listings in Grant County, Indiana
