= J.W. Patterson =

J.W. Patterson may refer to:

- J.W. Patterson House, a historic building in Fairmount, Indiana
- J.W. Patterson (debate coach), director of debate at the University of Kentucky
