= Burgoon (surname) =

Burgoon is a surname. Notable people with the surname include:

- Bronson Burgoon (born 1987), American golfer
- Eben Burgoon (born 1979), American-born writer
- Garrel Burgoon (1900–1970), American businessman and politician
- Judee K. Burgoon (born 1948), American professor

== See also ==
- Burgoyne
