= Operation Mongoose (disambiguation) =

Operation Mongoose, also known as the Cuban Project, was a campaign of terrorism and sabotage carried out by the US Central Intelligence Agency in Cuba.

Operation Mongoose may also refer to:

- Operation Mongoose (2003), an American-led cave clearing operation in the Adi Ghar Mountains of Kandahar Province, Afghanistan
- A 2005 military operation of the Iraq War
- "Operation: Mongoose", a 1998 undercover narcotics investigation by the Chicago Police Department; see Spanish Cobras
- "Operation Mongoose" (Once Upon a Time), an episode of the television series Once Upon a Time
- "Operation: Mongoose", a story arc in the webcomic Eben 07
