= Garrel (surname) =

Garrel or Garrels is a surname. Notable people with the surname include:

== Garrel ==
- Esther Garrel (born 1991), French actress
- Louis Garrel (born 1983), French actor and filmmaker
- Maurice Garrel (1923–2011), French actor
- Philippe Garrel (born 1948), French film director and screenwriter

== Van Garrel ==
- Betty van Garrel (1939–2020), Dutch journalist and writer

== Garrels ==
- Anne Garrels (born 1951), long-time foreign correspondent for National Public Radio in the United States
- John Garrels (1885–1956), American athlete in running, discus throw, shot put, and as a fullback and end in American football
- Josh Garrels (born 1980), American singer-songwriter, producer, and composer
- Robert Garrels (1916–1988), American geochemist

== See also ==
- Garrel Burgoon (1900–1970), American businessman and politician
