= Northview Elementary School =

Northview Elementary School may refer to:

- Northview Elementary School in Gas City, Indiana, Mississinewa Community School Corporation
- Northview Elementary School in Kansas City, Missouri, North Kansas City Schools
- Northview Elementary School in Bowie, Maryland, Prince George's County Public Schools (Washington, DC area)
- Northview Elementary School in Eagan, Minnesota, Independent School District 196 (Minneapolis-St. Paul area)
