= Grant County Jail and Sheriff's Residence =

Historic government buildings in Indiana, United States

- U.S. National Register of Historic Places
- U.S. Historic district – Contributing property
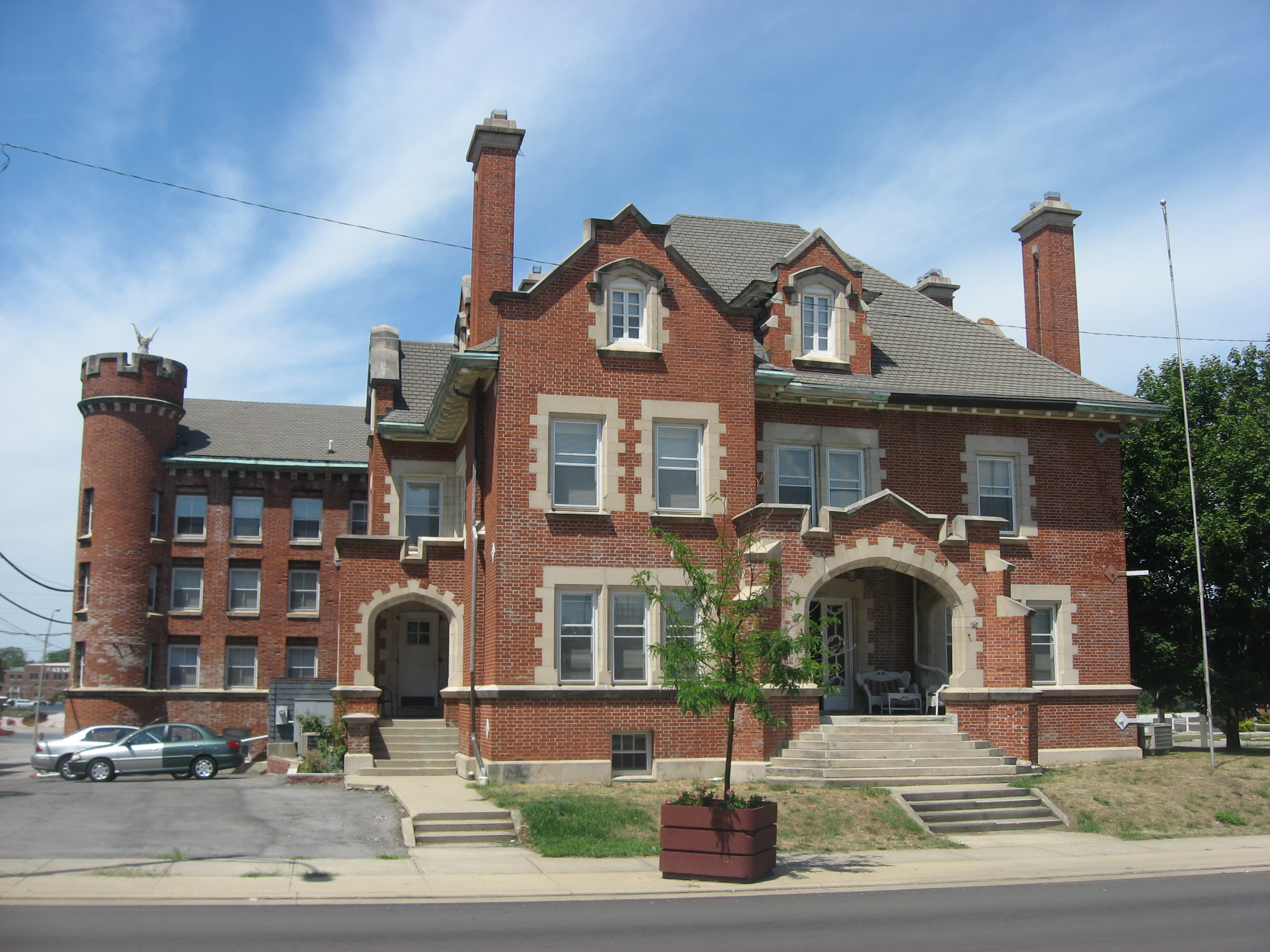

- Location within Indiana Location within the United States
- Location: 215 E. 3rd St., Marion, Indiana
- Coordinates: 40°33′33″N 85°39′28″W
- Area: less than one acre
- Built: 1904
- Built by: Patton, Philip
- Architect: Richards, McCarty, Bulford
- Architectural style: Queen Anne, Tudor Revival
- NRHP reference No.: 83004526
- Added to NRHP: November 19, 1990

Grant County Jail and Sheriff's Residence is a historic county jail and residence located at 215 East 3rd Street in Marion, Indiana, United States. It was designed by Richards, McCarty & Bulford and built in 1904. It consists of two distinct units that are constructed of red pressed brick with limestone detailing. The residence is in the Queen Anne style with English Tudor details. It sits on a raised basement and has a bell-cast roof. It has been converted into apartments.

It was listed on the National Register of Historic Places in 1990 and is part of the Marion Downtown Commercial Historic District.

== See also ==
- National Register of Historic Places listings in Grant County, Indiana
