= Gas City High School =

- U.S. National Register of Historic Places
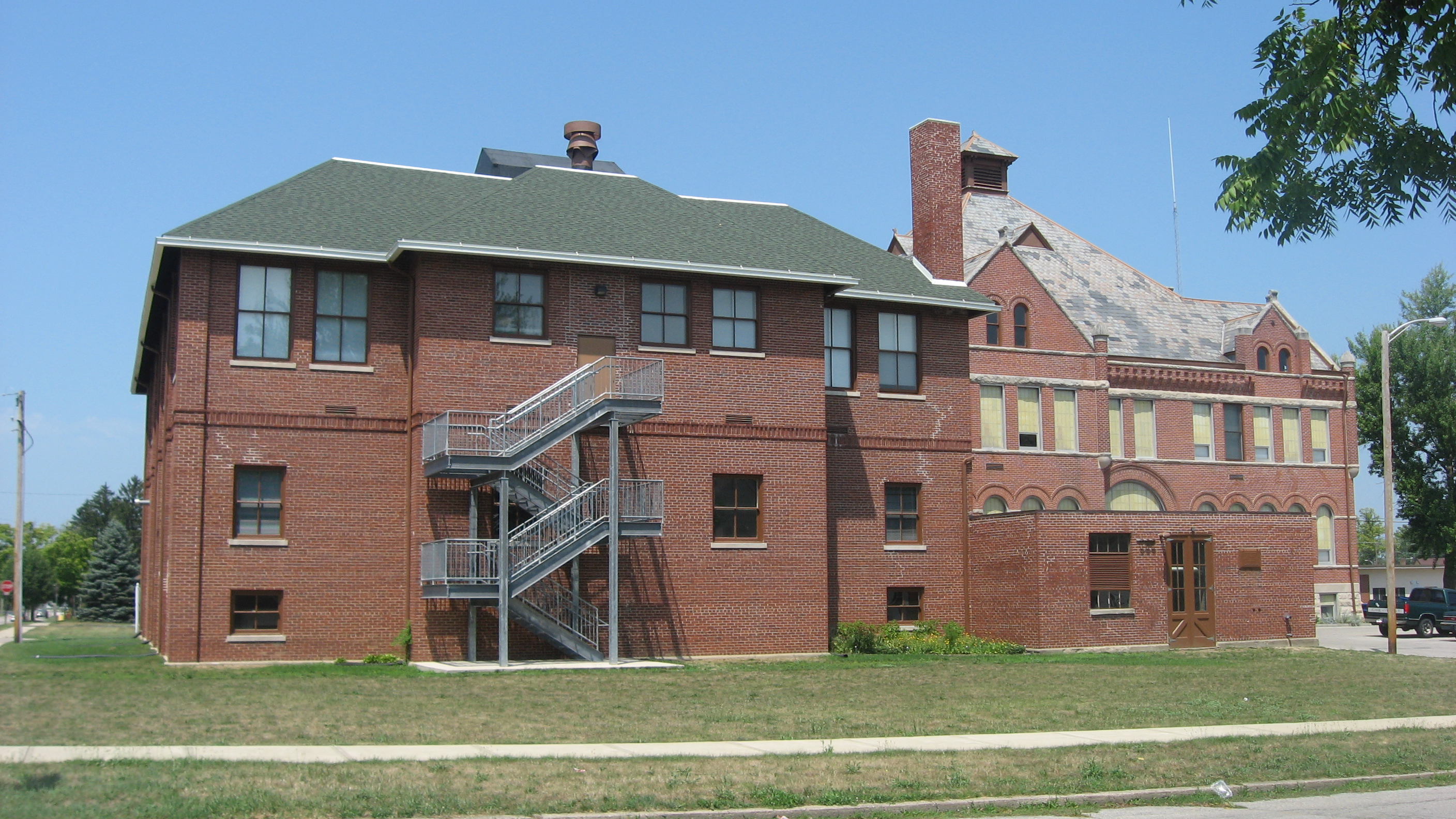
- Gas City High School, July 2012

- Location within Indiana Location within the United States
- Location: 400 East South A St., Gas City, Indiana
- Coordinates: 40°29′12″N 85°36′28″W
- Area: less than one acre
- Built: 1894, 1923
- Built by: Waldron, John H.
- Architectural style: Romanesque, Prairie School
- MPS: Indiana's Public Common and High Schools MPS
- NRHP reference No.: 03001316
- Added to NRHP: March 5, 2004

Gas City High School, also known as the East Ward School, is a historic school building located at Gas City, Indiana, United States. It was built in 1894, and is a two-story, square, Romanesque Revival style brick and stone building. A two-story Prairie School inspired addition was completed in 1923. The two buildings are connected by a two-story "bridge".

It is no longer used as a high school and is instead now used as the current administration building for Mississinewa Community School Corporation (MCSC).

It was listed on the National Register of Historic Places in 2004.
