= Baldwin Addition Historic District =

Historic district in Indiana, United States

- U.S. National Register of Historic Places
- U.S. Historic district
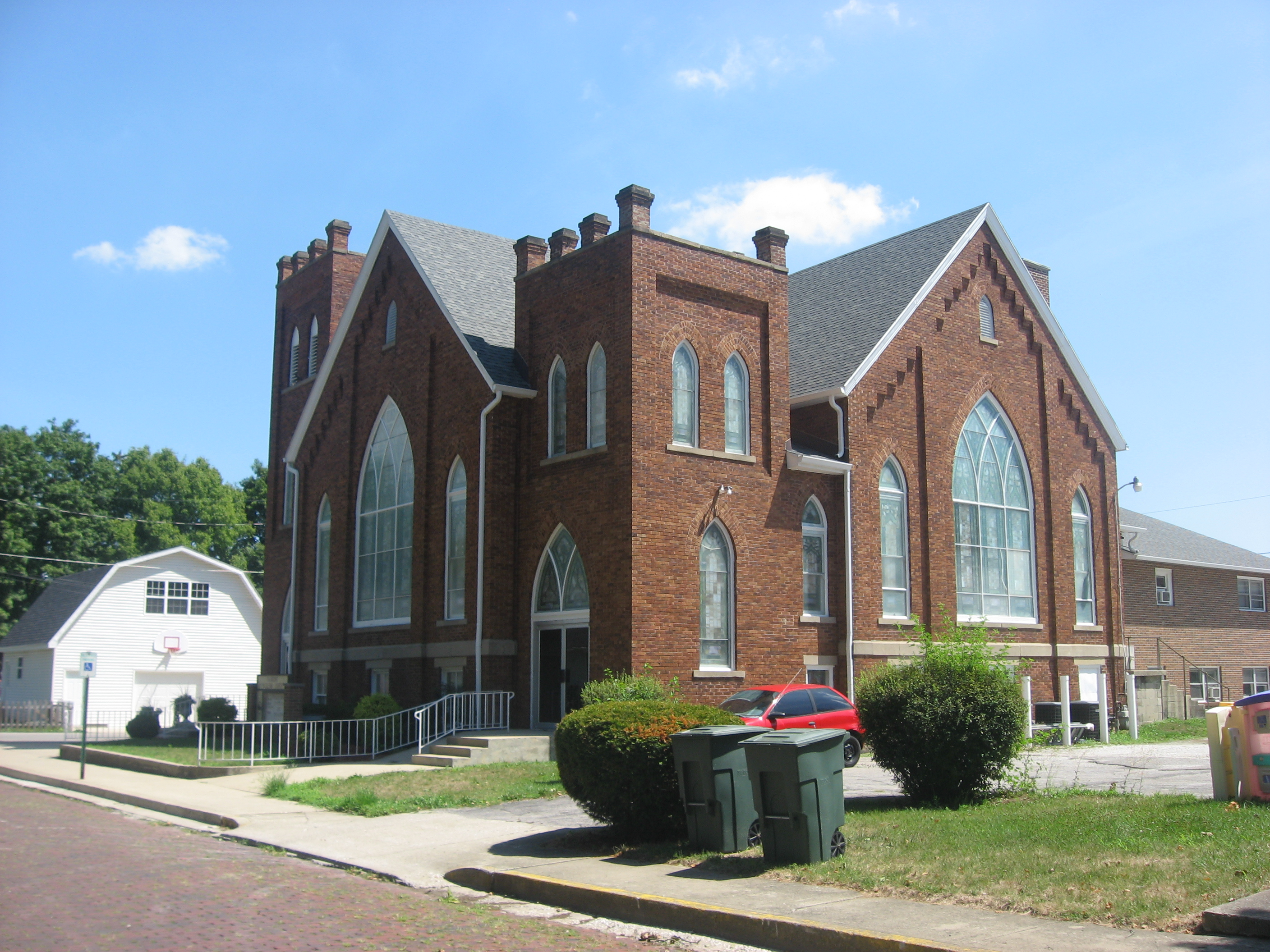
- Fairmount Wesleyan Church, July 2012

- Location within Indiana Location within the United States
- Location: Roughly along Main St., Between 2nd and 4th Sts., Fairmount, Indiana
- Coordinates: 40°25′6″N 85°39′0″W
- Area: 5.5 acres (2.2 ha)
- Built: 1857
- Architectural style: Queen Anne, Greek Revival, Gothic Revival
- NRHP reference No.: 99001108
- Added to NRHP: September 9, 1999

Baldwin Addition Historic District is a national historic district located at Fairmount, Indiana. It encompasses 14 contributing buildings and three contributing structures in a predominantly residential section of Fairmount. It was developed between about 1857 and 1930, and includes notable examples of Queen Anne and Greek Revival style architecture. Notable buildings include the Jonathan Baldwin House (1858), John Wilson Harvey houses (1893 and 1903), and the Gothic Revival style Fairmount Wesleyan Church (1916).

It was listed on the National Register of Historic Places in 1999.
