= Eben 07 =

Webcomic written by Eben Burgoon

Eben07
- Author(s): Eben Burgoon, writer, D.Bethel, illustration & writing
- Website: http://www.eben07.com/
- Current status/schedule: Weekly: Sunday
- Launch date: September 7, 2007:
- Genre(s): Action, comedy, Spy fiction, Spy-fi

Eben07 is a webcomic written by Eben Burgoon and pencilled, inked, and colored by D.Bethel. Eben07 features the fictional adventures of an espionage janitor named Eben07 and his partner Ninja Dan. Eben07 is story-driven, with twenty- to forty-page issues released one page per week on their website. The first comic was published online on September 7, 2007. Eben07 has been in print publication since late 2009. The website also sells Eben07 print books, T-shirts, and other merchandise.

== History ==
The character Eben 07 was initially a Bethel's drawing of Eben Burgoon in his high school garage band. Bethel and Burgoon combined Burgoon's love for spy fiction with D.Bethel's drawings and using Burgoon's AOL internet handle of Eben07 created a concept of a high school spy story. After the two left for different colleges, they reunited and ended up living together in San Luis Obispo. In 2007, they explored the idea of making an animated webseries using the old drawings and character of Eben 07, but twisted away from the high school spy story and looked at the aftermath of spy fiction. The idea of a humor story blended with the aftermath and destruction of action adventure and espionage fiction like James Bond and Metal Gear Solid. Shortly afterward, D.Bethel and Eben Burgoon dove into the idea of the Intelligence Cleaner Agency and their top covert custodians, Eben 07 & Ninja Dan and launched the webcomic in Sept. 7, 2007.

Pages were initially presented as 4 panel gag strips with a second double size Sunday page later in the week. Presently, the pages are formatted like a full page comic book to mirror printed publications. All pages have been digitally colored by D.Bethel, but starting in late 2008, comics began to be drawn and inked by hand by D.Bethel.

== Characters ==
=== Eben07 ===
Eben07 works as a field operative for the Intelligence Cleaner Agency, and cleans up the espionage mess left behind by notable super-spies in the espionage world. He is an ancestor of the founder of the I.C.A. and considered by most who he works with to be the best, but also is generally distracted and flippant about his line of work. He is a direct ancestor of the founder of the I.C.A., Abel, who is a mysteriously old figure that often interferes with Eben07's operations and work.

=== Ninja Dan ===
A cliché ninja who has been partnered with Eben07. Ninja Dan primarily is known for his use of a broom with swordblade. His character is defined by his loyalty, attention to detail, stoicism, and samurai bushido. However, a deeper rage can break through his calm exterior from time to time.

=== Abel ===
Introduced to the story as Eben07's ancestor and the founder of the Intelligence Cleaner Agency, Abel is mysteriously old having lived during the Revolutionary War when he discovered the Shot Heard 'Round the World. With that find, Abel started what is now known as the I.C.A. Abel is known for his villainous monologues, and for interfering with Eben07's work. He often wears scarves, long trench coats, and smokes a pipe.

== Story arcs ==
Eben07 comics tend to take place in the aftermath of a notable piece of Spy fiction. Each story has many absurd plot twists, and often makes references to outside works and notable pieces of nerd and internet pop culture.

=== Operation: Goofinger ===
Eben07 and Ninja Dan are sent to Ft. Knox, Kentucky to combat the mess left behind from the James Bond movie Goldfinger. The story follows the struggle over an Oddjob-like character between Eben07 and Ninja Dan against the Smithsonian Historical Intelligence Troupe.

=== Clean the Cleaners ===
Eben07 and Ninja Dan are removing henchmen in the jungles of Russia while cleaning for a Solid Snake-like operative. After the operation is given an abort code, Ninja Dan breaks I.C.A. rules and chooses to try to save his assigned secret agent while Eben07 is left incapacitated and confronted by his grandpa. A brief interlude in the comic shows the founding story of the I.C.A. presented in a Ken Burns-style documentary.

=== For the Love of Russia ===
The first official print offering of Eben07, this story follows Eben07 and Ninja Dan as they investigate an incident on the Orient Express following events alluded to in the James Bond story From Russia, with Love. Eben07 falls asleep reading The Master and Margarita and Ninja Dan works with a ghostly assassin, gypsies and eventually other members of the I.C.A. in an effort to revive him.

=== Operation: Mongoose ===
The second printed book follows the Abel character as he is sent by U.S. President John F. Kennedy to assassinate Fidel Castro. However, Abel proves to be terrible at the job since his world revolves around cleaning, not creating, the mess. As the story progresses Abel is dragged into a deeper conspiracy. Abel's involvement in the assassination of John F. Kennedy and Abraham Lincoln are explored.

=== Operation: 3-Ring Bound ===
D.Bethel and Eben Burgoon's longest effort together is spread across five separate issues. Operation: 3-Ring Bound puts Eben07 and Ninja Dan into the unwitting role of undercover high school students sent to find out why the nation's high school janitors are disappearing. Issue One introduces the main antagonist, HS English professor Milton Binder and Eben07's love interest and femme fatale, Anna Jacques. Issue Two reveals firmly that Anna Jaques is working for the Smithsonian Institution and she pits Eben07 and Ninja Dan against each other in a dodgeball game before Ninja Dan finds out his evil adopted ninja brother is working for Milton Binder. Issue Three brings Eben07 and Anna closer together as they infiltrate Milton Binder's subterranean lair. Meanwhile, Ninja Dan and Ninja Justin fight each other in the halls of the high school. The climax of the issue reveals that Eben07 is a clone of Abel. Issue Four concludes Ninja Dan and Ninja Justin's sword fight while Eben07 comes to terms with his feelings about Anna and the revelation of being a clone before Abel shows up and beats up Eben07. Issue Five is currently in production and being released on Eben07.com.

== In print ==
As of August 2012, five print versions of the Eben07 adventures.

- Operation: For the Love of Russia (44 pages) Released September 2008
- Operation: Mongoose (24 pages) Released December 2009
- Operation: 3-Ring Bound, Issue 1 (44 pages) Released September 2010
- Operation: 3-Ring Bound, Issue 2 (24 pages) Released March 2011
- Operation: 3-Ring Bound, Issue 3 (28 pages) Released September 2011

The remaining two issues of Operation: 3-Ring Bound are expected in September and November.

== Reception ==
Eben07 has generally received favorable reviews from Ain't It Cool News.

== See also ==
- James Bond
- Spy-fi
