= Marion Downtown Commercial Historic District =

Historic district in Indiana, United States

- U.S. National Register of Historic Places
- U.S. Historic district
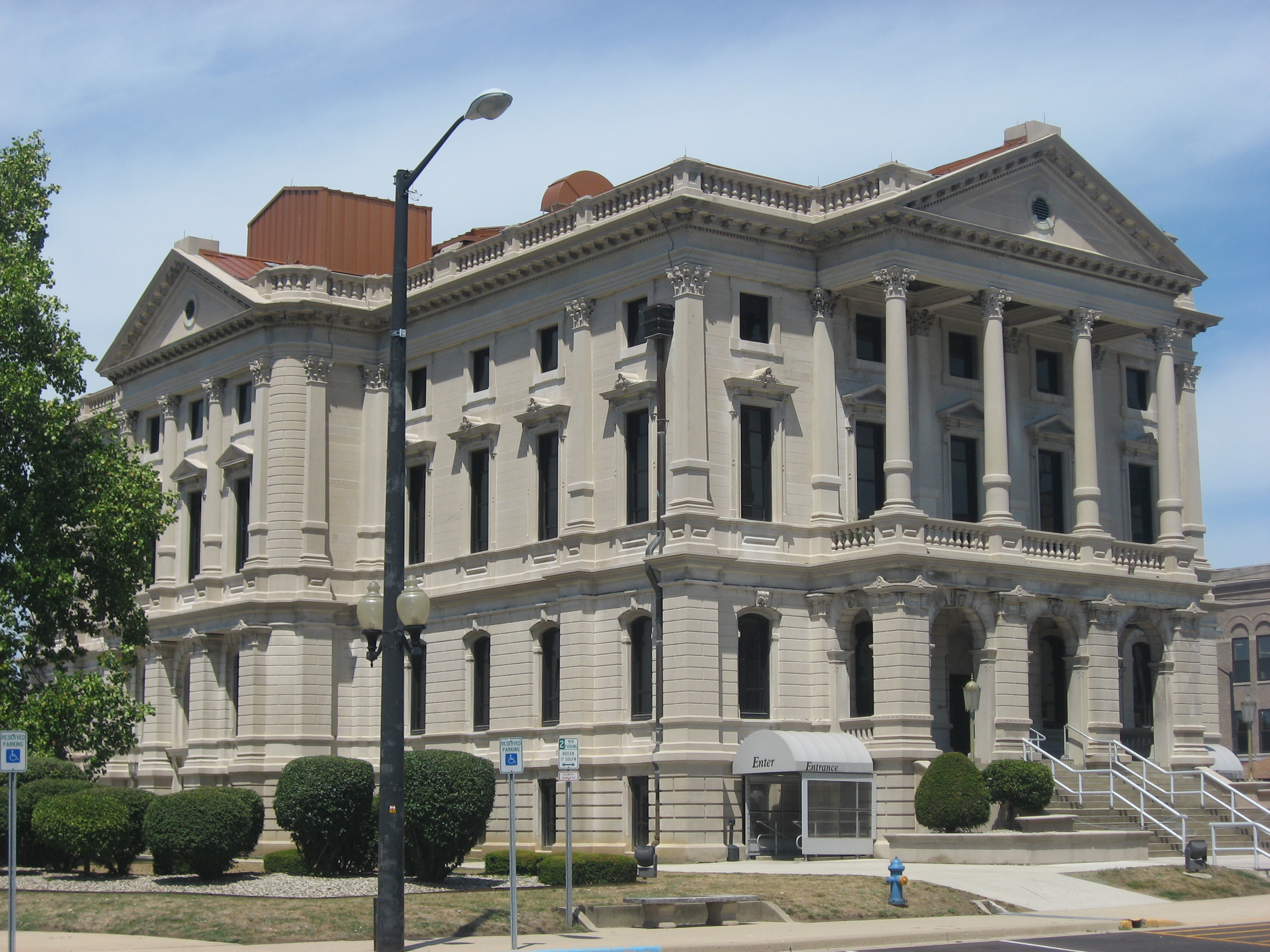
- Grant County Courthouse, July 2012

- Location within Indiana Location within the United States
- Location: Roughly bounded by 7th, 2nd, Branson and Gallatin Sts., Marion, Indiana
- Coordinates: 40°33′27″N 85°39′35″W
- Area: 8 acres (3.2 ha)
- Architect: Myers, Elijiah; Richards, McCarty, and Bulford
- Architectural style: Italianate, Romanesque, Classical Revival
- NRHP reference No.: 94000226
- Added to NRHP: March 17, 1994

Marion Downtown Commercial Historic District is a national historic district located at Marion, Indiana. It encompasses 52 contributing buildings, 2 contributing structures, and 1 contributing object in the central business district of Marion. It developed between about 1870 and 1942, and includes notable examples of Italianate, Romanesque, and Classical Revival style architecture. Located in the district is the separately listed Grant County Jail and Sheriff's Residence. Other notable buildings are the Grant County Courthouse (1881–1883), Marion Bank Building (c. 1917), Iroquois Building (c. 1895), Dan-Mar Apartments (c. 1900), United Telephone Block (c. 1903), Cecelian Apartments (c. 1915), Marion Post Office (c. 1942), and William Smith Building / Mecca Club (c. 1917).

It was listed on the National Register of Historic Places in 1994.
