= Eben Burgoon =

American comics writer

- Born: Eben Emil Benjamin Burgoon; December 15, 1979 (age 46) United States
- Areas: Writer, cartoonist, editor, letterer, producer
- Notable works: Eben 07; B-Squad

Eben Burgoon (born 1979) is an American-born writer best known for the webcomic series Eben 07: Covert Custodian and B-Squad: Soldiers of Misfortune. He is currently working on his independent series Tiny Wizards with artist Dean Beattie.

== Biography ==
Eben Burgoon was raised in San Luis Obispo county and attended San Luis Obispo High School, which was lightly lampooned in his comic work with Eben 07. He attended college at California State University, Chico. He studied international relations and minored in creative writing. He currently lives in Sacramento, California.

== Impact ==
Burgoon has worked with non-profits, arts organizations, comic book conventions, and educational spaces to promote the joy of creating comics and educate writers of all ages. He created a comics education program that yielded two books by partnering with a small non-profit in Sacramento. Students at a primary school in Sacramento learned the basics of comic books and writing before developing a pitch that ultimately led to working with comic artists in the Sacramento region. Additionally, his educational workshops have been featured at the Crocker Art Museum, regional libraries, and comic book conventions.

Since 2013, Burgoon co-organizes a comic-convention themed arts night, Crocker-Con, at the Crocker Art Museum which draws about 1000 people annually.

In 2019, Burgoon accepted an invitation to the Sharjah International Book Fair to conduct cartooning and comic book workshops for youth in the United Arab Emirates. He has also been a comics & arts educator and guest speaker at Maker Faire's in Cairo, Rome, Lithuania, and China.

== Inspirations ==
Much of his writing work follows a theme of parody of pop culture and approaching the subject with mashups or unusual angle. In many interviews, Eben Burgoon discusses influences on his work. Among them are pop-entertainment like James Bond, Venture Brothers., as well as writers like Dan Harmon, Ian Fleming, and Douglas Adams.

== Comic book bibliography ==
Eben07: Covert Custodian 2007–2013 Independent webcomic series. Premise follows janitors tasked with cleaning the mess left by super-spies like James Bond. Illustrated by D.Bethel.

- Operation: Goofinger, 2007
- Operation: Clean the Cleaners, 2007
- For the Love of Russia, Brainfood Comics, 2009
- Operation Mongoose, 2009
- Operation: 3-Ring Bound #1, Brainfood Comics, 2010
- Operation: 3-Ring Bound #2, Brainfood Comics, 2010
- Operation: 3-Ring Bound #3, 2011
- Operation: 3-Ring Bound #4, 2012
- Operation: 3-Ring Bound #5, unreleased in print

B-Squad: Soldiers of Misfortune 2012-Current Independent comic book series. Premise follows a misfit squad of mercenaries, during each adventure one main character is killed; selected randomly by author using a six-sided die. Each adventure is illustrated by a different artist or artistic team. Comic series inspired a beer, B-Squad Blonde Ale, brewed by New Helvetia Brewing Company in Sacramento. B-Squad was picked up for development by Starburns Industries Press, a division of Starburns Industries, which rereleased the first issue as an exclusive for Comic Con International.

- Issue One, 2014, Kickstarter, illustrated by Lauren Monardo.
- Issue One, 2019, SBI Press, illustrated by Lauren Gramprey.
- Issue Two, 2014, Kickstarter, illustrated by Jon Williams and Claudia Palescandolo.
- Volume One, Kickstarter, 2015
- Volume Two, Kickstarter, 2016

Tiny Wizards 2019-Current Independent graphic novel series. Illustrated by UK-based artist Dean Beattie, Tiny Wizards is a fantasy-humor graphic novel series following the surviving wizards from a dying fantasy kingdom that transported themselves into the modern day Earth. However, the wizards seem to have miscalculated their spells and arrived about the size of an action figure and only inhabit fast food restaurants. The debut story was released in the summer of 2021 amid the COVID-19 pandemic and debuted by Burgoon and Beattie at Thought Bubble Festival, one of the UK's largest comic book conventions. At the end of 2021, Tiny Wizards was named as a Top 20 Small Press Comic by Pipedream Comics.
