= Thompson-Ray House =

Historic house in Indiana, United States

- U.S. National Register of Historic Places
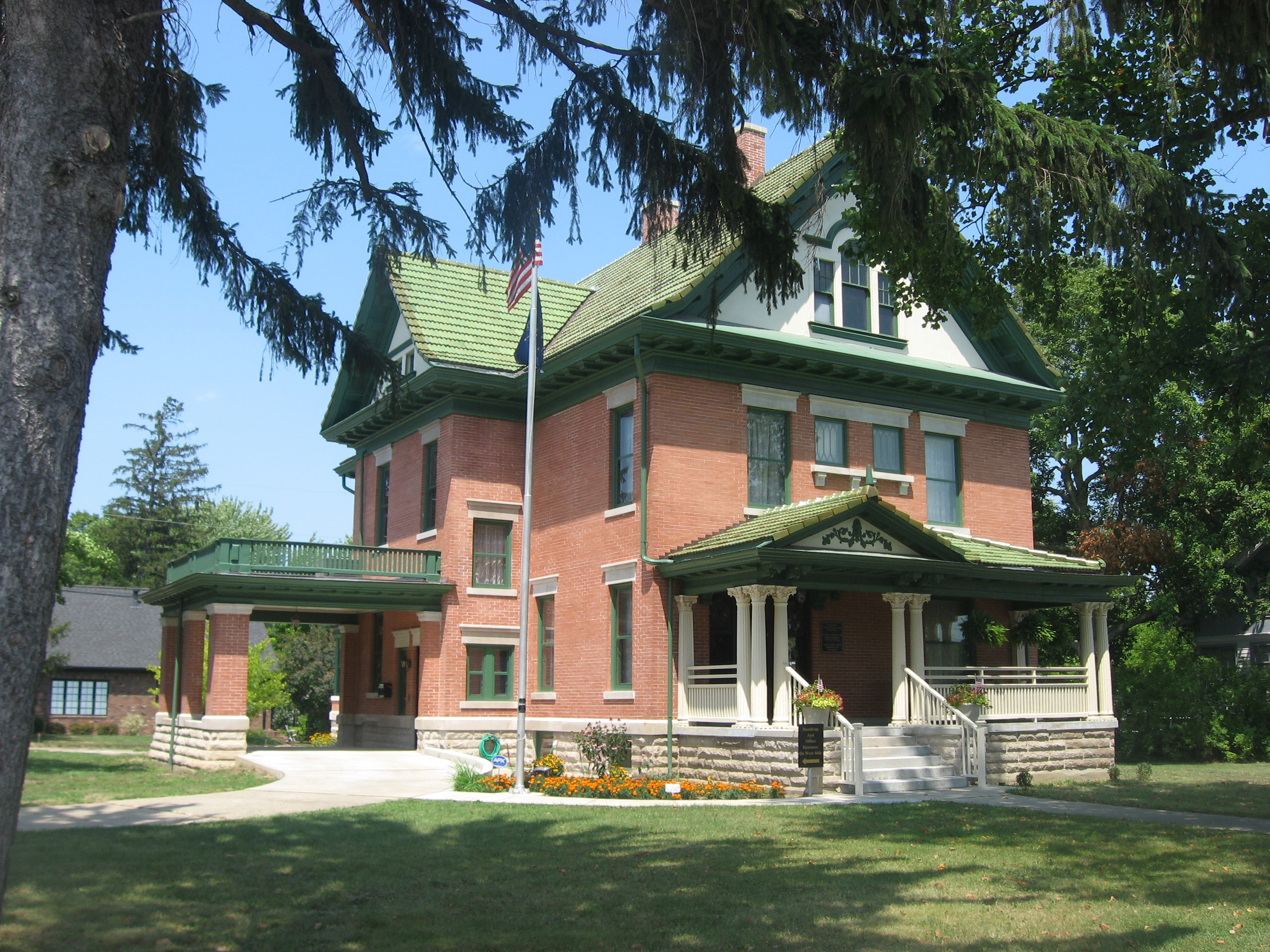
- Thompson-Ray House, July 2012

- Location within Indiana Location within the United States
- Location: 407 E. Main St., Gas City, Indiana
- Coordinates: 40°29′23″N 85°36′31″W
- Area: less than one acre
- Built: 1902-1906
- Built by: Waldron, John H.
- Architect: Elder, Hiram
- Architectural style: Late Victorian, Free Classic
- NRHP reference No.: 09000756
- Added to NRHP: September 24, 2009

Thompson-Ray House is a historic home located at Gas City, Indiana. It was built between 1902 and 1906, and is a 2 1/2-story, Late Victorian Free Classic style brick and stone dwelling. It has a cruciform plan and gable roof. It features porches with multiple classical columns and a porte cochere.

It was listed on the National Register of Historic Places in 2009.

It currently is owned by Leadership Education and Development (LEAD) Inc., and houses an office for Greater Grant County Chamber of Commerce.
