= Fairmount Commercial Historic District =

Historic district in Indiana, United States

- U.S. National Register of Historic Places
- U.S. Historic district
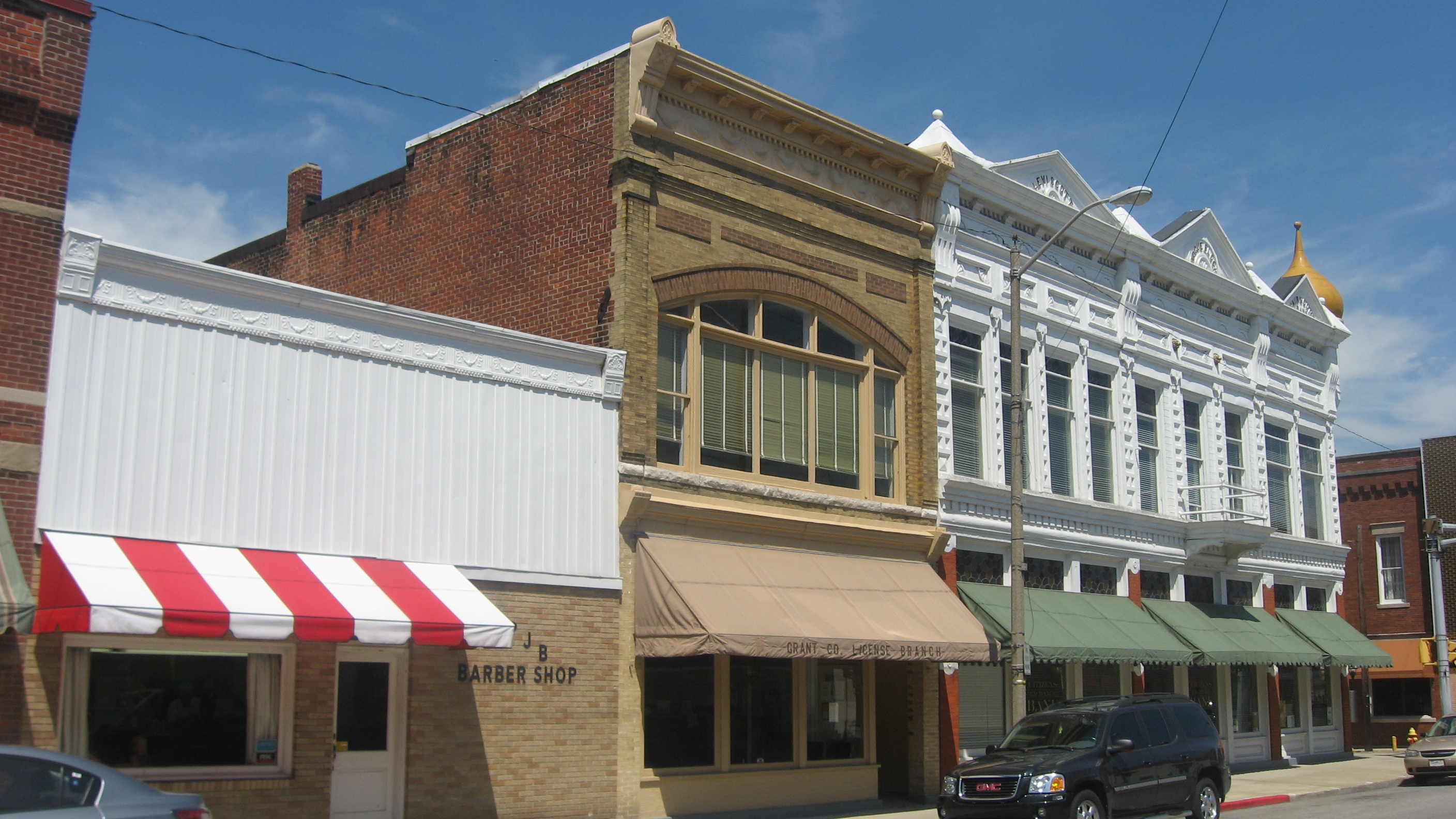
- Fairmount Commercial Historic District, July 2012

- Location within Indiana Location within the United States
- Location: 205-101 S. Main, 102-124 N. Main, 124-102 S. Main, 101-123 N. Main, 107 W. 1st, 119-117 W. Washington, Fairmount, Indiana
- Coordinates: 40°24′57″N 85°39′02″W
- Area: 3.8 acres (1.5 ha)
- Built: 1884
- Architectural style: Late Victorian, Late 19th And Early 20th Century American Movements
- NRHP reference No.: 99000295
- Added to NRHP: March 12, 1999

Fairmount Commercial Historic District is a national historic district located at Fairmount, Indiana. It encompasses 31 contributing buildings in the central business district of Fairmount. It developed between about 1884 and 1945, and includes notable examples of Italianate and Romanesque Revival style architecture. Notable buildings include the Scott Opera House (1884), M.A. Hiatt Building (1900), Bogue Block (1889), J.W. Dale Block (1889), Fairmount Block (1901), Fairmount Public Library (1891–1893), Odd Fellow Block (1902), and Masonic Temple (1904).

It was listed on the National Register of Historic Places in 1999.
