= Mississinewa Community School Corporation =

School district in Indiana, United States

Mississinewa Community School Corporation (MCSC) is a school district headquartered in the Frederick W. Hengstler Adminsistration Building in Gas City, Indiana.

The district, in Grant County, has the borders of Mill Township. It covers the vast majority of Gas City's city limits (including all of its residential zoned land) as well as Jonesboro and small pieces of Marion (one piece is zoned for residential purposes).

== History ==
July 1, 2024, Jeremy Fewell became the superintendent. The board of trustees renewed his superintendent contract in 2026.

In November 2026 there is a scheduled referendum on the operation of the district. The district's board of trustees passed a resolution that if the voters were to vote down the referendum, the district's transportation program would be discontinued. All of the members of the board voted for this resolution. Fewell stated that the funding cuts from Senate Enrolled Act 1 (SEA 1) forced the district to do this, and that "We are not the ones that have enacted a decision to how the funding works. We have to operate with whatever [members of the Indiana Congress] give us."

== Schools ==
- Mississinewa High School
- R. J. Baskett Middle School
- Northview Elementary School
- Westview Elementary School
