= West Ward School (Gas City, Indiana) =

- U.S. National Register of Historic Places
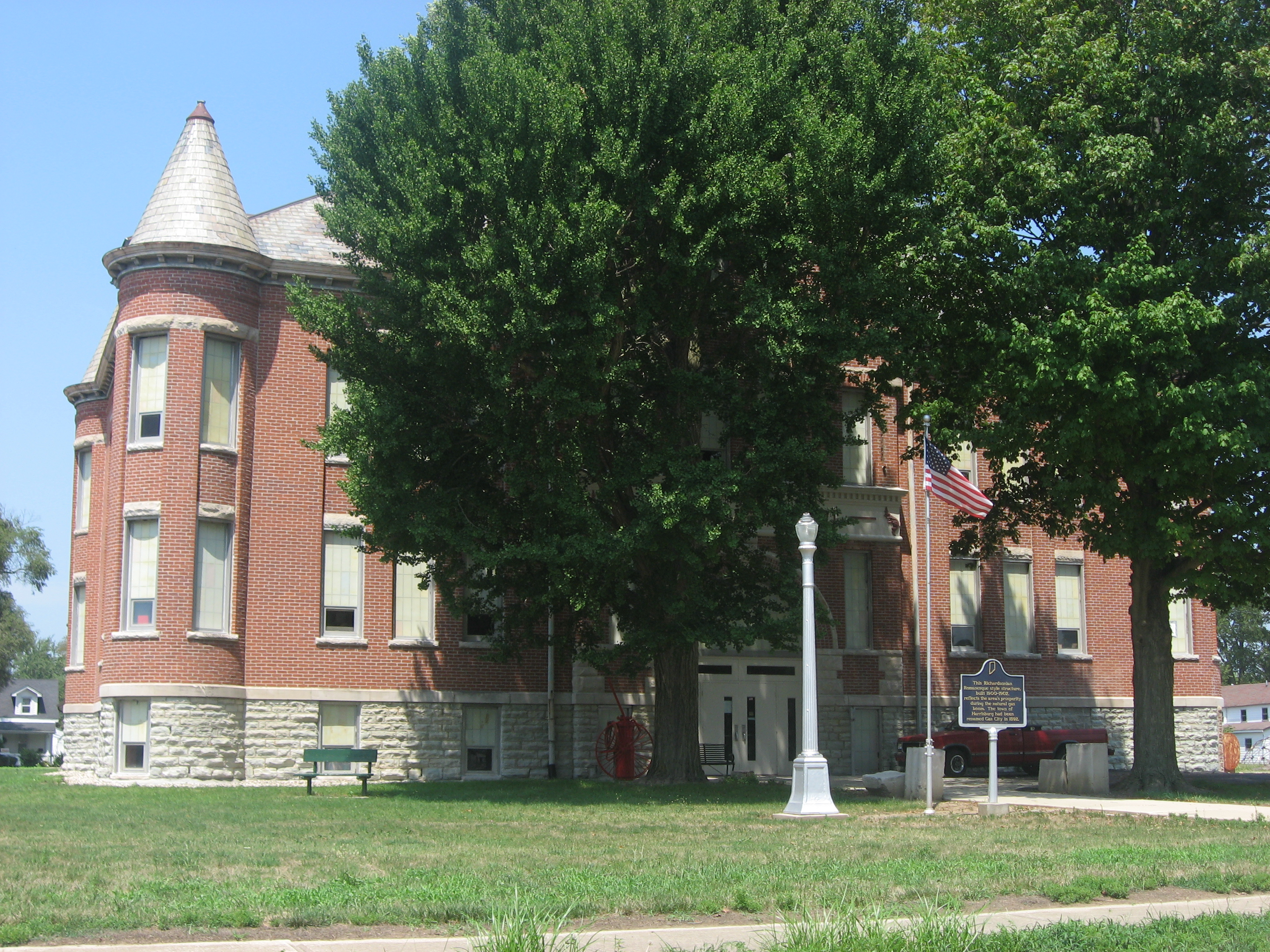
- West Ward School, July 2012

- Location within Indiana Location within the United States
- Location: 210 W. North A St., Gas City, Indiana
- Coordinates: 40°29′21″N 85°37′2″W
- Area: 2 acres (0.81 ha)
- Built: 1900-1902
- Built by: Waldron, John H.
- Architectural style: Romanesque, Richardsonian Romanesque
- NRHP reference No.: 85003226
- Added to NRHP: December 19, 1985

West Ward School, also known as the West Building Mississinewa Community Schools, is a historic school building located at Gas City, Indiana. It was built between 1900 and 1902, and is a 2 1/2-story, rectangular, Richardsonian Romanesque style brick and stone building. It features a symmetrical main facade with round towers at each corner topped by conical roofs. The building houses a museum and community center.

It was listed on the National Register of Historic Places in 1985.
