= Gas City, Indiana =

Gas City
- City
- City of Gas City
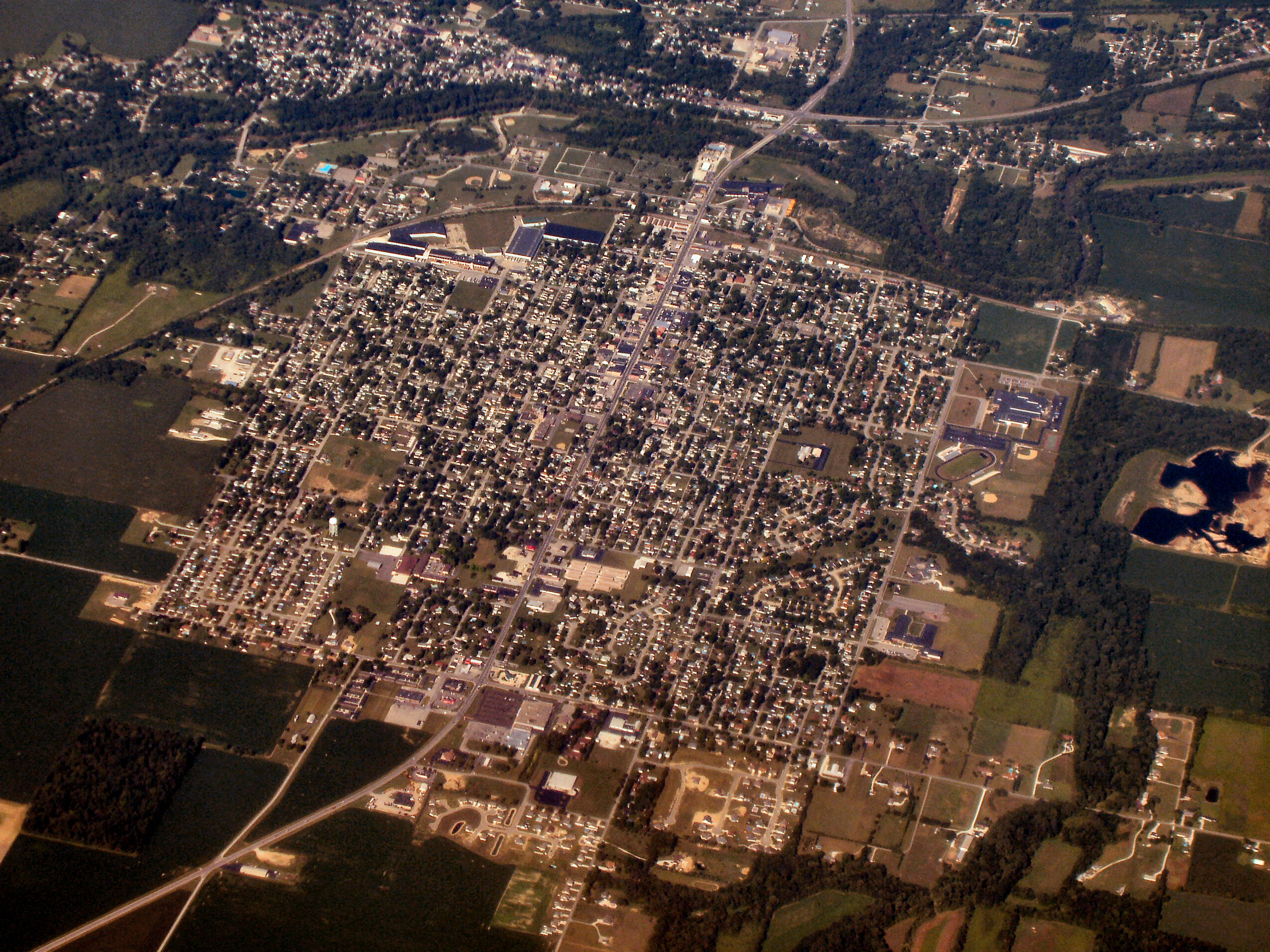
- Aerial view of Gas City facing southwest

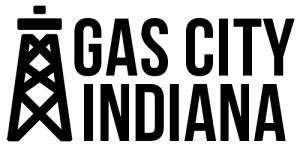
- Flag Logo

- Location of Gas City in Grant County, Indiana.
- Coordinates: 40°29′27″N 85°36′20″W
- Country: United States
- State: Indiana
- County: Grant
- Founded: 1892

Government
  - Mayor: Bill Rock Jr. (I)

Area
  - Total: 5.03 sq mi (13.02 km^{2})
  - Land: 5.03 sq mi (13.02 km^{2})
  - Water: 0 sq mi (0.00 km^{2})
- Elevation: 853 ft (260 m)

Population (2020)
  - Total: 6,157
  - Estimate (2025): 6,129 ▼
  - Density: 1,224.8/sq mi (472.88/km^{2})
- Time zone: UTC-5 (EST)
  - Summer (DST): UTC-4 (EDT)
- ZIP code: 46933
- Area code: 765
- FIPS code: 18-27054
- GNIS feature ID: 2394866
- Website: gascitygov.com

Gas City is a city in Grant County, Indiana, United States, along the Mississinewa River. The population was 6,157 at the 2020 census.

== History ==
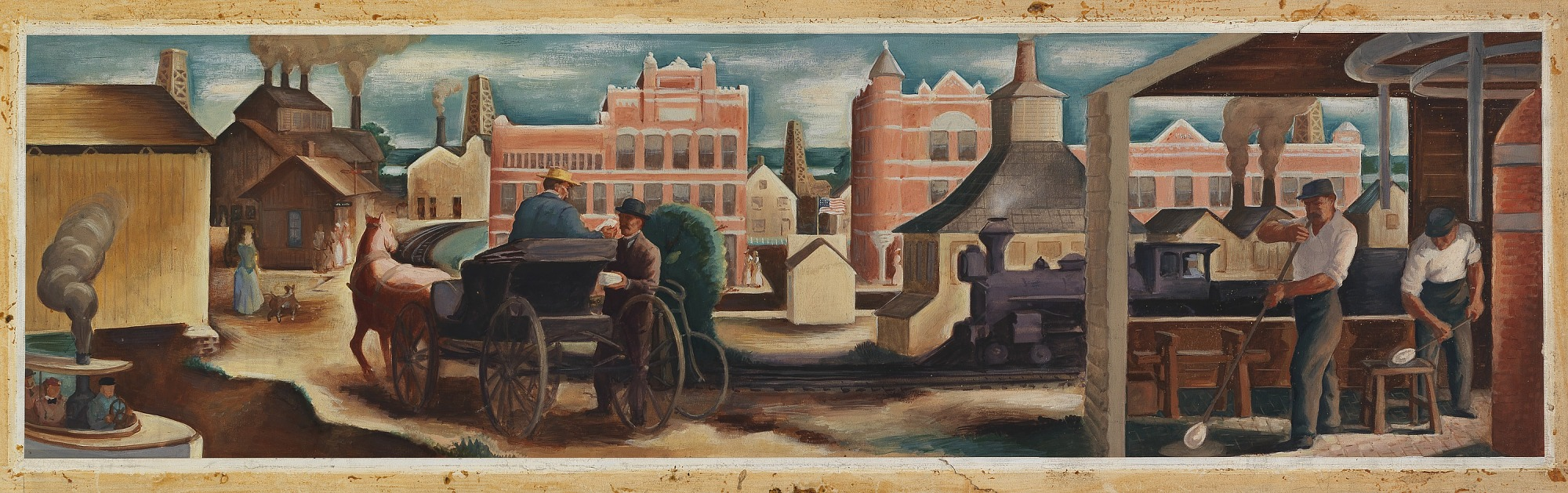
Gas City–Boom Days, Gas City Post Office (1939)

Gas City was first known as Harrisburg when settled on May 25, 1867, by Noah Harris. It became a boom town when natural gas was found in the area in 1887 as part of the Indiana gas boom. The Gas City Land Company was founded on March 21, 1892, and the town of about 150 people changed its name to Gas City a few days later. However, much of the natural gas was depleted by the late 1800s and early 1900s, often due to inefficient extraction.

The Gas City High School, Thompson-Ray House, and West Ward School are listed on the National Register of Historic Places.

Gas City annually hosts the Ducktail Run Rod and Custom Car Show in the Fall. The "Ducktail Run," as it is known to locals, is a large car show featuring vehicles from 1972 and older. In the year 2020, the Festival had 2,020 vehicles register to appear.

== Geography ==
According to the 2010 census, Gas City has a total area of 4.56 square miles (11.81 km^{2}), all land.

== Demographics ==
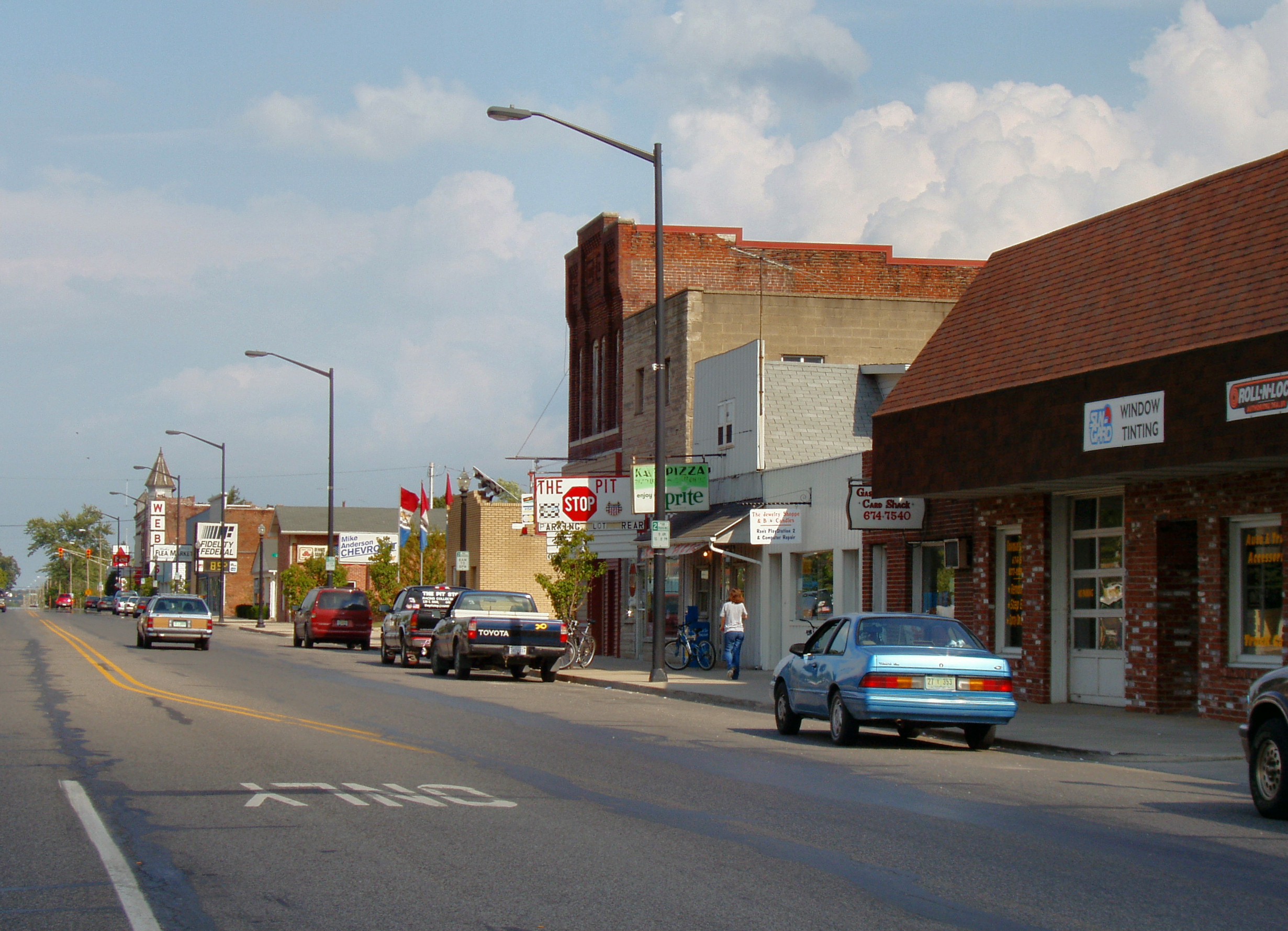
Gas City downtown.

Historical population
Census	Pop.	Note	%±
1880	145		—
1890	145		0.0%
1900	3,622		2,397.9%
1910	3,224		−11.0%
1920	2,870		−11.0%
1930	3,087		7.6%
1940	3,488		13.0%
1950	3,787		8.6%
1960	4,469		18.0%
1970	5,742		28.5%
1980	6,370		10.9%
1990	6,296		−1.2%
2000	5,940		−5.7%
2010	5,965		0.4%
2020	6,157		3.2%
2025 (est.)	6,129		−0.5%
U.S. Decennial Census

=== 2020 census ===
As of the 2020 census, Gas City had a population of 6,157. The median age was 40.4 years. 23.6% of residents were under the age of 18 and 18.7% of residents were 65 years of age or older. For every 100 females there were 89.8 males, and for every 100 females age 18 and over there were 85.3 males age 18 and over.

98.7% of residents lived in urban areas, while 1.3% lived in rural areas.

There were 2,562 households in Gas City, of which 30.6% had children under the age of 18 living in them. Of all households, 39.7% were married-couple households, 18.7% were households with a male householder and no spouse or partner present, and 33.1% were households with a female householder and no spouse or partner present. About 30.8% of all households were made up of individuals and 13.6% had someone living alone who was 65 years of age or older.

There were 2,734 housing units, of which 6.3% were vacant. The homeowner vacancy rate was 1.6% and the rental vacancy rate was 6.1%.

Racial composition as of the 2020 census
Race	Number	Percent
White	5,610	91.1%
Black or African American	67	1.1%
American Indian and Alaska Native	30	0.5%
Asian	33	0.5%
Native Hawaiian and Other Pacific Islander	0	0.0%
Some other race	68	1.1%
Two or more races	349	5.7%
Hispanic or Latino (of any race)	226	3.7%

=== 2010 census ===
As of the census of 2010, there were 5,965 people, 2,410 households, and 1,632 families living in the city. The population density was 1,308.1 inhabitants per square mile (505.1/km^{2}). There were 2,597 housing units at an average density of 569.5 per square mile (219.9/km^{2}). The racial makeup of the city was 96.2% White, 0.9% African American, 0.3% Native American, 0.4% Asian, 0.4% from other races, and 1.7% from two or more races. Hispanic or Latino of any race were 2.4% of the population.

There were 2,410 households, of which 34.0% had children under the age of 18 living with them, 47.2% were married couples living together, 15.1% had a female householder with no husband present, 5.4% had a male householder with no wife present, and 32.3% were non-families. 27.4% of all households were made up of individuals, and 11.6% had someone living alone who was 65 years of age or older. The average household size was 2.45 and the average family size was 2.92.

The median age in the city was 39.4 years. 24.6% of residents were under the age of 18; 7.4% were between the ages of 18 and 24; 25.6% were from 25 to 44; 27.1% were from 45 to 64; and 15.4% were 65 years of age or older. The gender makeup of the city was 48.2% male and 51.8% female.

=== 2000 census ===
As of the census of 2000, there were 5,940 people, 2,393 households, and 1,643 families living in the city. The population density was 1,599.2 inhabitants per square mile (617.5/km^{2}). There were 2,497 housing units at an average density of 672.3 per square mile (259.6/km^{2}). The racial makeup of the city was 97.46% White, 0.30% African American, 0.32% Native American, 0.22% Asian, 0.07% Pacific Islander, 0.56% from other races, and 1.08% from two or more races. Hispanic or Latino of any race were 1.52% of the population.

There were 2,393 households, out of which 31.4% had children under the age of 18 living with them, 52.1% were married couples living together, 12.6% had a female householder with no husband present, and 31.3% were non-families. 26.8% of all households were made up of individuals, and 10.9% had someone living alone who was 65 years of age or older. The average household size was 2.46 and the average family size was 2.95.

In the city, the population was spread out, with 25.2% under the age of 18, 8.2% from 18 to 24, 29.1% from 25 to 44, 23.8% from 45 to 64, and 13.6% who were 65 years of age or older. The median age was 37 years. For every 100 females, there were 90.2 males. For every 100 females age 18 and over, there were 84.1 males.

The median income for a household in the city was $35,940, and the median income for a family was $42,056. Males had a median income of $34,020 versus $23,482 for females. The per capita income for the city was $18,295. About 8.1% of families and 10.2% of the population were below the poverty line, including 13.8% of those under age 18 and 8.3% of those age 65 or over.

== Transport ==
Gas City is served by several state and federal routes:

- Interstate 69 (exit 259)
- U.S. Route 35
- State Road 22

== Education ==
Mississinewa Community School Corporation covers the portion in Mill Township, which is vast majority of the city limits, and includes all areas zoned for residential purposes. The Mississinewa district includes Mississinewa High School, R.J. Baskett Middle School, and Northview Elementary school, all in the city.

Some areas of the city limits, which contain business or industrial-zoned land, are in Eastbrook Community School Corporation (areas in Jefferson and Monroe townships) and Marion Community Schools (areas in Center Township).

The town has a lending library, the Gas City-Mill Township Public Library.

== Notable people ==
- Garrel Burgoon, businessman and politician
- Thomas Francis Jr., physician, virologist, and epidemiologist
- Alta Little, baseball player
- William Skelly, oil entrepreneur
