= Garrel Burgoon =

American businessman and politician

Garrel Burgoon (June 15, 1900 – November 14, 1970) was an American businessman and politician.

Burgoon was born in Gas City, Indiana. He moved with his family in 1910 to Lawrence County, Illinois. Burgoon went to the Lawrence County public schools and graduated from Bridgeport High School in Bridgeport, Illinois. He then went to Purdue University. Burgoon served in the United States Army during World War I and World War I. He owned a grocery store in Lawrenceville, Illinois. Burgoon served as sheriff of Lawrence County from 1950 to 1955 and was a Republican. Burgoon served in the Illinois House of Representatives from 1955 until his death in 1970. He died at the Indiana University Medical Hospital in Indianapolis, Indiana after undergoing surgery.
