= J.W. Patterson House =

Historic house in Indiana, United States

- U.S. National Register of Historic Places
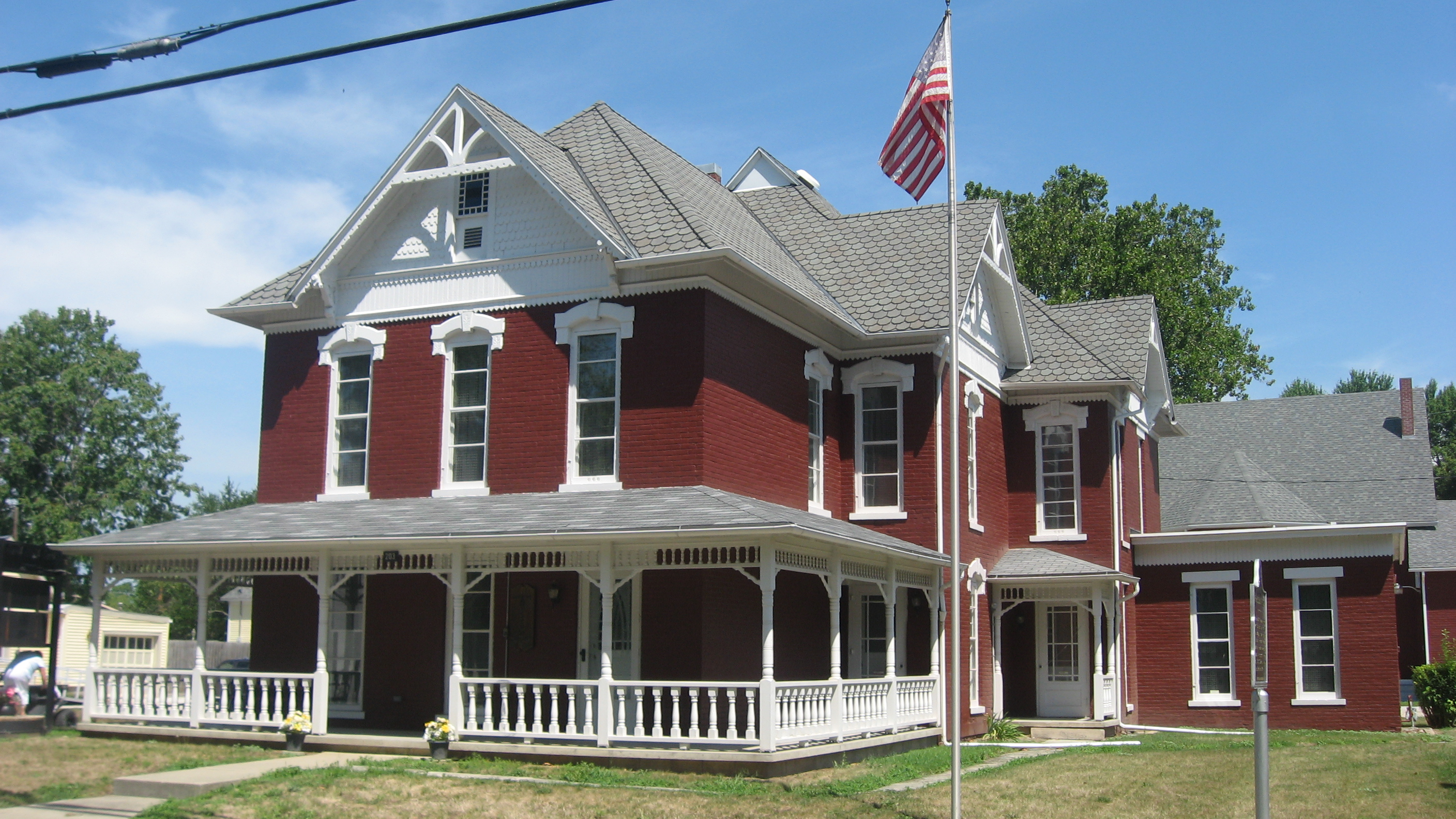
- J.W. Patterson House, July 2012

- Location within Indiana Location within the United States
- Location: 203 E. Washington St., Fairmount, Indiana
- Coordinates: 40°24′56″N 85°38′56″W
- Area: less than one acre
- Built: 1887-1890, 1900
- Architectural style: Stick/eastlake, Queen Anne
- NRHP reference No.: 79000016, 85000088 (Boundary Increase)
- Added to NRHP: November 14, 1979, January 18, 1985 (Boundary Increase)

J.W. Patterson House is a historic home and office located at Fairmount, Indiana. The house was built between 1887 and 1890, and is a two-story, brick dwelling with Queen Anne and Stick Style design elements. It has a slate covered hipped roof with gables and wraparound front porch. Also on the property is a one-story detached cottage that served as a doctor's office. It was the home and office of prominent local physician Dr. J.W. Patterson.

It was listed on the National Register of Historic Places in 1979, with a boundary increase in 1985.
