= Fairmount, Indiana =

- Town
- Town of Fairmount
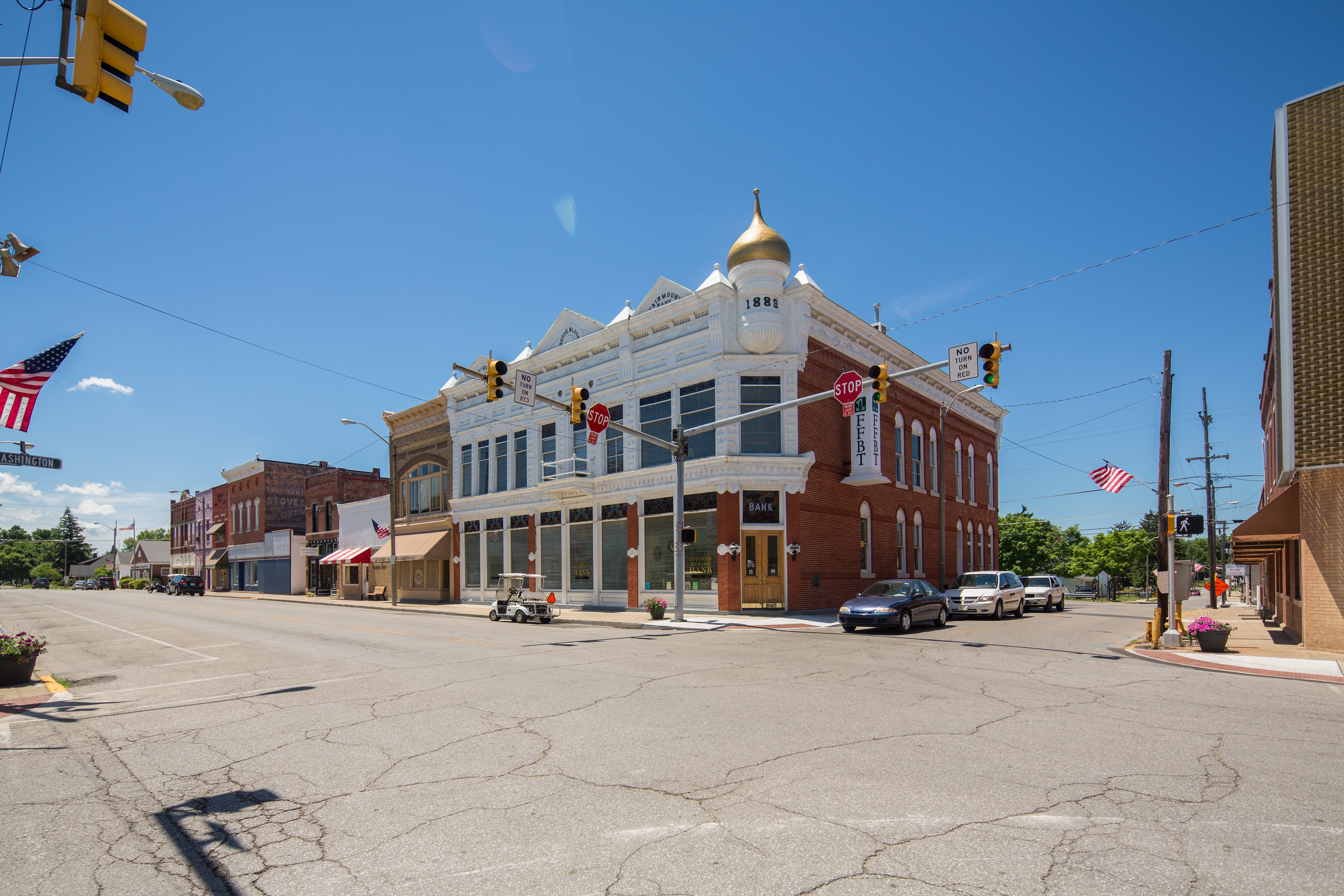
- Downtown Fairmount

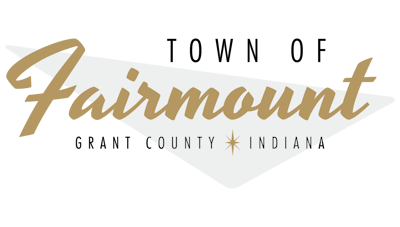
- Logo

- Location of Fairmount in Grant County, Indiana.
- Coordinates: 40°25′02″N 85°38′52″W
- Country: United States
- State: Indiana
- County: Grant
- Township: Fairmount

Government
  - Type: Town council

Area
  - Total: 1.59 sq mi (4.11 km^{2})
  - Land: 1.59 sq mi (4.11 km^{2})
  - Water: 0 sq mi (0.00 km^{2})
- Elevation: 866 ft (264 m)

Population (2020)
  - Total: 2,682
  - Estimate (2025): 2,673 ▼
  - Density: 1,691/sq mi (652.9/km^{2})
- Time zone: UTC-5 (EST)
  - Summer (DST): UTC-4 (EST)
- ZIP code: 46928
- Area code: 765
- FIPS code: 18-22432
- GNIS feature ID: 2396931
- Website: www.fairmount-in.com

Fairmount is a town in Fairmount Township, Grant County in the east-central part of the U.S. state of Indiana. The population was 2,682 at the 2020 census. It is 55 miles (88 km) northeast of Indianapolis. Largely a bedroom community for nearby Marion, Fairmount is best known as the boyhood home of actor James Dean, who is buried there.

== History ==
The Fairmount area was settled in the 1830s mostly by Quakers from North Carolina. The town was laid out in 1850 and named for Fairmount Park in Philadelphia; it was formally incorporated in 1870.

After a large deposit of natural gas was found in 1887, Fairmount became part of the Indiana Gas Boom and a center of the glass industry for the rest of the 19th century. Shortly after the depletion of the gas in 1900 the automobile industry set up factories in the nearby large cities, and Fairmount became a bedroom community, restoring some of its lost prosperity.

In the 1940s, James Dean lived with an aunt and uncle, Ortense and Marcus Winslow, on a farm north of Fairmount. He attended Fairmount High School, graduating in 1949. After his death in 1955, Dean was buried in Park Cemetery. In 1996, a small Memorial Park north of the town's business district was dedicated in his memory with a bronze bust by Hollywood artist Kenneth Kendall.

The 1988 music video for British singer Morrissey's "Suedehead," directed by Tim Broad, was filmed on location in Fairmount, Indiana. The video is a tribute to his idol, James Dean, and features several of Dean's childhood haunts, including his family farm, high school, and gravesite at Park Cemetery

During the prosperity of the 1960s, Fairmount enjoyed a time of building with a new town hall, water works, post office and elementary school. At the end of the decade the local school district merged with a neighboring one, forming the Madison-Grant united school district. A new high school was built for this district, and Fairmount High School became a middle school. When a new junior high school was opened in 1986, the Fairmount High School building was permanently closed.

The Baldwin Addition Historic District, Fairmount Commercial Historic District, and J.W. Patterson House are listed on the National Register of Historic Places.

== Geography ==
According to the 2010 census, Fairmount has a total area of 1.58 square miles (4.09 km^{2}), all land.

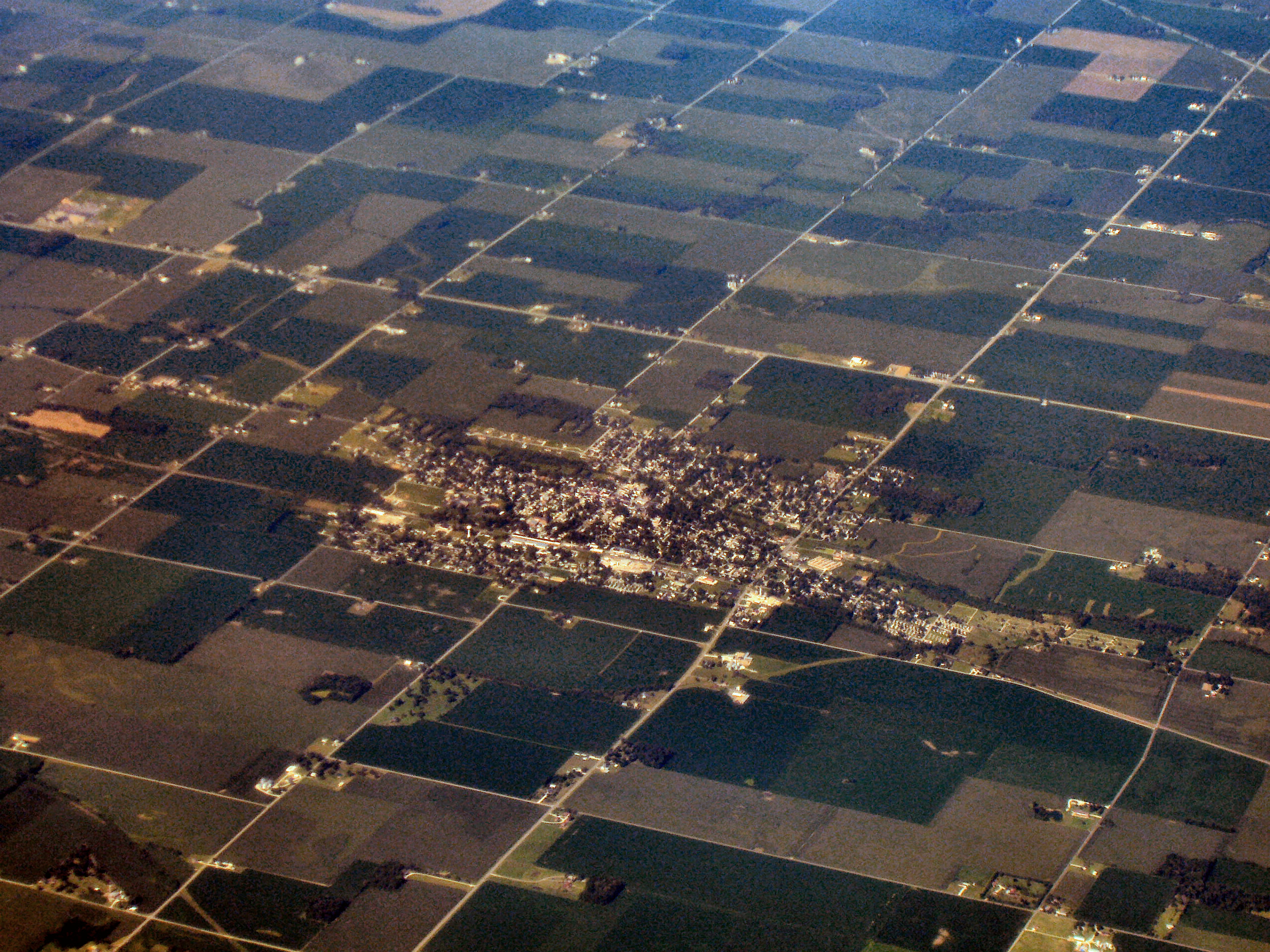
Fairmount from the air, looking southwest.

== Demographics ==
Historical population
Census	Pop.	Note	%±
1870	337		—
1880	563		67.1%
1890	1,462		159.7%
1900	3,205		119.2%
1910	2,506		−21.8%
1920	2,155		−14.0%
1930	2,056		−4.6%
1940	2,382		15.9%
1950	2,646		11.1%
1960	3,080		16.4%
1970	3,427		11.3%
1980	3,286		−4.1%
1990	3,130		−4.7%
2000	2,992		−4.4%
2010	2,954		−1.3%
2020	2,682		−9.2%
2025 (est.)	2,673	▼	−0.3%
U.S. Decennial Census

=== 2020 census ===
As of the 2020 census, Fairmount had a population of 2,682. The median age was 45.5 years. 20.8% of residents were under the age of 18 and 23.5% of residents were 65 years of age or older. For every 100 females there were 90.2 males, and for every 100 females age 18 and over there were 88.7 males age 18 and over.

0.0% of residents lived in urban areas, while 100.0% lived in rural areas.

There were 1,170 households in Fairmount, of which 25.2% had children under the age of 18 living in them. Of all households, 42.3% were married-couple households, 18.2% were households with a male householder and no spouse or partner present, and 31.1% were households with a female householder and no spouse or partner present. About 32.3% of all households were made up of individuals and 16.5% had someone living alone who was 65 years of age or older.

There were 1,288 housing units, of which 9.2% were vacant. The homeowner vacancy rate was 2.1% and the rental vacancy rate was 8.5%.

Racial composition as of the 2020 census
Race	Number	Percent
White	2,491	92.9%
Black or African American	18	0.7%
American Indian and Alaska Native	4	0.1%
Asian	1	0.0%
Native Hawaiian and Other Pacific Islander	3	0.1%
Some other race	22	0.8%
Two or more races	143	5.3%
Hispanic or Latino (of any race)	60	2.2%

=== 2010 census ===
As of the census of 2010, there were 2,954 people, 1,241 households, and 837 families living in the town. The population density was 1,869.6 inhabitants per square mile (721.9/km^{2}). There were 1,350 housing units at an average density of 854.4 per square mile (329.9/km^{2}). The racial makeup of the town was 98.6% White, 0.1% African American, 0.2% Native American, 0.2% Asian, 0.2% from other races, and 0.7% from two or more races. Hispanic or Latino of any race were 0.9% of the population.

There were 1,241 households, of which 31.2% had children under the age of 18 living with them, 48.6% were married couples living together, 14.1% had a female householder with no husband present, 4.8% had a male householder with no wife present, and 32.6% were non-families. 28.0% of all households were made up of individuals, and 12% had someone living alone who was 65 years of age or older. The average household size was 2.38 and the average family size was 2.85.

The median age in the town was 40.3 years. 23.9% of residents were under the age of 18; 8.4% were between the ages of 18 and 24; 23.2% were from 25 to 44; 28% were from 45 to 64; and 16.5% were 65 years of age or older. The gender makeup of the town was 48.5% male and 51.5% female.

=== 2000 census ===
As of the census of 2000, there were 2,992 people, 1,226 households, and 859 families living in the town. The population density was 2,033.0 inhabitants per square mile (784.9/km^{2}). There were 1,325 housing units at an average density of 900.3 per square mile (347.6/km^{2}). The racial makeup of the town was 98.30% White, 0.17% Black or African American, 0.70% Native American, 0.20% Asian, 0.07% from other races, and 0.57% from two or more races. Hispanic or Latino of any race were 0.43% of the population.

There were 1,226 households, out of which 31.2% had children under the age of 18 living with them, 55.5% were married couples living together, 11.0% had a female householder with no husband present, and 29.9% were non-families. 26.5% of all households were made up of individuals, and 12.5% had someone living alone who was 65 years of age or older. The average household size was 2.44 and the average family size was 2.91.

In the town, the population was spread out, with 25.2% under the age of 18, 8.2% from 18 to 24, 28.2% from 25 to 44, 24.3% from 45 to 64, and 14.1% who were 65 years of age or older. The median age was 38 years. For every 100 females, there were 90.5 males. For every 100 females age 18 and over, there were 90.0 males.

The median income for a household in the town was $33,843, and the median income for a family was $44,033. Males had a median income of $31,136 versus $23,041 for females. The per capita income for the town was $18,029. About 7.4% of families and 9.1% of the population were below the poverty line, including 11.8% of those under age 18 and 7.8% of those age 65 or over.

== Education ==
Madison-Grant United School Corporation operates public schools Fairmount is assigned to.

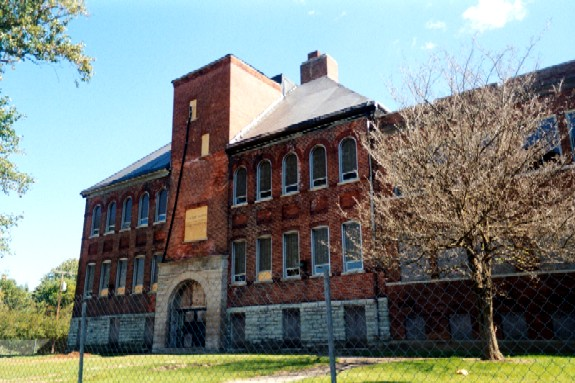
Abandoned Fairmount High School building in 2003. The building was torn down in 2015.

Schools serving Fairmount:

- Park Elementary School (Fairmount)
- Madison-Grant Junior High School (unincorporated area)
- Madison-Grant High School (unincorporated area)

The town has a lending library, the Fairmount Public Library.

== Notable people ==
- Jim Davis, cartoonist, creator of the comic strip Garfield, was raised in Fairmount. Davis graduated from Fairmount High School in 1963.
- James Dean, actor, was raised in Fairmount. Dean graduated from Fairmount High School in 1949, and is buried in Park Cemetery in Fairmount.
- David L. Payne, politician, considered the "Father of Oklahoma." Payne County, OK is named for him.
- Olive Rush, artist, painter, was a Quaker descended from one of the town's founders. She was noted as a founder of the art colony in Santa Fe, New Mexico.
- Robert Sheets, former director of the National Hurricane Center in Coral Gables, Florida. Sheets is a 1955 graduate of Fairmount High School and attended Ball State University in nearby Muncie.
- Mary Jane Ward, author of several books including The Snake Pit, a Book of the Month Club selection which became a motion picture starring Olivia de Havilland.
